= The Battle of the Harvests =

1942 film

- Title Frame
- Directed by: Stanley Jackson
- Produced by: James Beveridge
- Narrated by: Stanley Jackson
- Cinematography: Denis Gillson
- Music by: Lucio Agostini
- Production company: National Film Board of Canada
- Distributed by: Columbia Pictures of Canada
- Release date: 1942
- Running time: 18 minutes
- Country: Canada
- Language: English

The Battle of the Harvests (aka Battle of the Harvests) is an 18-minute 1942 Canadian documentary film, made by the National Film Board of Canada (NFB) as part of the wartime Canada Carries On series. The film was produced by James Beveridge and directed by Stanley Jackson, who also provided the narration. The Battle of the Harvests shows how the farmers were mobilized worldwide in a battle on the farmland to serve the fighting nations during the Second World War. The film's French version title was La Bataille des récoltes.

== Synopsis ==
In 1942, farmers have become an important part of the war effort on the North American home front. The prairie farmlands in Canada are the world's richest and provide the food for the Allied nations. Food production was aided by favourable weather and introduction of scientific innovations and methods such as irrigation, terraced fields and planned forms. Canada has also embarked on a program of rationing and conservation to ensure food is available for all its wartime needs.

In the United Kingdom, agriculture has undergone a great transformation. In 20 months, English farmers have repaired the damage suffered over 20 years through the use of machinery, new farming methods and the reclamation of two billion acres of farmland from pastures and parks making the difference. The subsequent increase in annual grain production rose from prewar levels of 100 tons to 170 tons. To help meet the nation's food needs, over five million English households have also planted their own gardens. The critical need for farm workers has led to ordinary civilians joining with soldiers to bring in the harvest.

In the war-torn Soviet Union, collectivization has harnessed the potential of its farm "factories" to fulfill the needs of its people. From the wheat fields of the Caucasus, harvests have been able to provide for its far-flung millions. Collectivization has brought an integration of its food resources, creating a powerful agricultural sector that rivals its industrial might.

Food has been of primary concern to Canada, as at the heart of many of the government's wartime food policies was the need to feed Canada's soldiers and overseas Allies. Instead of the scarcity and shortages that people faced in the 1930s, the knowledge that a nutritious diet was necessary for a fighting man meant that a healthy, hard-working populace would result. Agricultural products have also become the raw elements of new products from flax fibre used for parachute cords, dandelions and milkweed crushed to become synthetic rubber and sunflower seed made into oil.

Food represents half the weight of products that are being shipped across the world. Canada alone provided five million tons of wheat, while the United States joined with Canada to provide other food stuffs. Previously occupied by the Axis powers, Algiers and Morocco received the first emergency supplies of food, shipped alongside weapons. When the Allied forces are finally able to further liberate the conquered peoples of Europe and Asia, providing an adequate supply of food will be one of the first priorities.

In Canada, the devastating Depression years notion that food was only a money-making commodity, has been countered by understanding that agriculture is a vital sector on the home front. The erosion of the Great Plains had caused great ecological and economic damage that took years of proper cultivation, new irrigation programs and careful government planning to undo. Farmers and ranchers began to become more involved in their welfare with progressive organizations formed for optimal use of the land.

As industrial production in Canada ramped up, the inevitable shortages in agricultural labour have been met by a variety of new workers, from women to youth and even American farmers from the deep south who have already completed their harvests, coming north to help bring in a later harvest. The joint effort of Canadians from every walk of life, who have come to understand that food is our "weapon of war", have brought in the largest harvest in Canada's history, twice as large as the year previous.

== Cast ==
- General George Marshall as himself (archival footage)

== Production ==
Typical of the NFB's Canada Carries On series of documentary short films, The Battle of the Harvests was a morale-boosting propaganda film made in cooperation with the Director of Public Information, Herbert Lash. Using newsreel material, the film was a compilation documentary, edited to provide a coherent story, and narrated by its director, Stanley Jackson.

Stanley Jackson alternated with stage actor Lorne Greene, known for his work on both radio broadcasts as a news announcer at CBC, as the main narrators of the Canada Carries On series. Jackson's voice was "mellifluous" and sounded scholarly, while Greene's voice was more dramatic. Jackson was considered the "house" narrator at the NFB, setting the standard for other NFB directors later to take on the role of narrating their own films. (Note: Jackson had been a teacher before coming to the NFB.)

== Reception ==
As part of the Canada Carries On series, The Battle of the Harvests was produced in 35 mm for the theatrical market. Each film was shown over a six-month period as part of the shorts or newsreel segments in approximately 800 theatres across Canada. The NFB had an arrangement with Famous Players theatres to ensure that Canadians from coast-to-coast could see them, with further distribution by Columbia Pictures.

After the six-month theatrical tour ended, individual films were made available on 16 mm to schools, libraries, churches and factories, extending the life of these films for another year or two. They were also made available to film libraries operated by university and provincial authorities. A total of 199 films were produced before the series was canceled in 1959.

== See also ==
- Food - Weapon of Conquest (1941) NFB documentary
- The Harvest Shall Come (1942) British documentary
- Tomorrow's World (1943) NFB documentary
- U.N.R.R.A. presents In the Wake of the Armies ... (1944) NFB documentary
