= Break-through (1944 film) =

- Screenshot of the opening title
- Produced by: James Beveridge
- Narrated by: Lorne Greene
- Production company: National Film Board of Canada
- Distributed by: Columbia Pictures of Canada
- Release date: 1944
- Running time: 11 minutes
- Country: Canada
- Language: English

Break-through is an 11-minute 1944 Canadian documentary film, made by the National Film Board of Canada (NFB) as part of the wartime Canada Carries On series. The film documents the attack on Fortress Europe during the Second World War and the advance of Allied forces to the borders of Nazi Germany. Break-through was produced by James Beveridge. The film's French version title is L'assaut.

== Synopsis ==
On June 6, 1944, supported by an immense naval armada, Allied troops, including the First Canadian Army, led by General Harry Crerar, launch an amphibious invasion of Normandy, France. Facing fierce resistance by Nazi forces, the Allied armies establish a beachhead on the Normandy coast.

Seeking redemption after their earlier rout at the Dieppe raid in 1942, the Canadians are able to gain control of Juno Beach. Before regrouping for an advance into France, Allied troops are replenished by transport of war materiél and reinforcements. The Canadian contingent is tasked with an attack on Caen, France, held by the German 7th Army.

In the Normandy countryside, a pin-point Allied bombing campaign, along with marauding fighter-bombers, begins to wreak havoc on the enemy defences. Fleets of Supermarine Spitfires and Hawker Typhoons, likewise, sweep the skies in front of them. The extremely close cooperation and coordination between the Canadian air and ground forces enable the First Canadian Army to steadily advance on Caen.

By the end of June, bitter street fighting in Caen gives way to attacks in the hedgerows beyond the city, with the Canadians continually forcing the Nazi defenders back. In liberating Caen, the Canadian troops enter a devastated city, yet are warmly greeted by its remaining French citizens. Simultaneous Allied attacks throughout France lead to the liberation of Marseille, Toulon, Bourdeaux and even Paris.

Joining with other Allied forces, the Canadians encircle the remaining enemy forces in the Falaise Pocket, resulting in the collapse of the German defence lines and the capture of the trapped Nazi 7th Army. As the Canadian troops continue their relentless advance eastward to the borders of Nazi Germany, a stark comparison between Canada's "citizen army" and the ruthless and desperate conscripted Nazi soldiers, is clearly evident.

== Cast ==
- General Harry Crerar as Himself (archival footage)
- Correspondent Ross Munro as Himself (archival footage)
- General Bernard Montgomery as Himself (archival footage)
- General Dwight D. Eisenhower as Himself (archival footage)
- Marshal of the Royal Air Force Arthur Tedder as Himself (archival footage)

== Production ==
Typical of the NFB's Second World War documentary short films in the Canada Carries On series, Break-through was created as a morale boosting propaganda film. The film was a compilation documentary that relied heavily on combat footage shot by the Canadian armed forces, and the film units of the U.S. Army Signal Corps and the British Army, edited by producer James Beveridge to provide a coherent message.

The deep baritone voice of stage actor Lorne Greene was featured in the narration of Break-through. Greene was known for his work on radio broadcasts as a news announcer at CBC, as well as narrating many of the Canada Carries On series. His sonorous recitation led to his nickname, "The Voice of Canada", and to some observers, the "voice-of-God". When reading grim battle statistics or narrating a particularly serious topic, he was known as "The Voice of Doom".

== Reception ==
Break-through was produced in 35 mm for the theatrical market. Each film was shown over a six-month period as part of the shorts or newsreel segments in approximately 800 theatres across Canada. The NFB had an arrangement with Famous Players theatres to ensure that Canadians from coast-to-coast could see them, with further distribution by Columbia Pictures.

After the six-month theatrical tour ended, individual films were made available on 16 mm to schools, libraries, churches and factories, extending the life of these films by another year or two. They were also made available to film libraries operated by university and provincial authorities. A total of 199 films were produced before the series was canceled in 1959.

== See also ==
- Road to the Reich (1945)
- The War Is Over (1945)
