= Industrial Canada =

- Title frame
- Directed by: Guy L. Coté
- Written by: Guy L. Coté; Gilbert Choquette
- Produced by: Guy L. Coté; Nicholas Balla (Executive producer)
- Narrated by: Budd Knapp
- Cinematography: Reginald Morris
- Edited by: Guy L. Coté
- Production company: National Film Board of Canada
- Distributed by: Canadian Broadcasting Corporation; National Film Board of Canada
- Release date: 1958; (broadcast date)
- Running time: 18 minutes, 27 seconds
- Country: Canada
- Language: English

Industrial Canada is a 1958 18-minute Canadian short National Film Board of Canada (NFB) documentary film produced, directed and edited by Guy L. Coté for the Canadian Broadcasting Corporation (CBC) television series, as part of the postwar Canada Carries On series. Industrial Canada documents the industrial development of Canada during the mid-1950s. The film's French version title is Le Canada industriel.

== Synopsis ==
In the short span of 50 years, Canada has transformed from a primarily agricultural economy to a nation increasingly reliant on an industrial base. Throughout the 20th Century, more than half of the population was involved in agrarian activities and rural life, with numerous small towns and villages spread across the country.

The traditional way of life based on back-breaking toil and skills passed on through the generations to provide for food and necessities was changing. An increased demand for commodities resulted in the adoption of mechanization, the assembly line and mass production. As industries began to compete with agriculture, more of a reliance on factories and cities began to change the Canadian landscape.

Canada is rich in natural resources with an abundance of raw materials necessary for industrial development. Minerals such as asbestos, iron, uranium, nickel, copper, gold and zinc were available for both export and domestic use. With the availability of vast reservoirs of water to create hydro-electric power and the "black gold" of coal mines, basic metals can be produced, such as aluminum.

When war came to Canada in the 1940s, massive engineering and manufacturing centres were created to produce the weapons of war from detonator caps to four-engined bombers. Industrial production was greatly increased with the addition of many new mines and smelters in the most northerly regions of the Canadian Shield, with new communities built around them.

Building on the industrial progress of wartime, in a postwar world, Canadian factories and manufacturing plants were able to pivot to new products and industries, such as the design of commercial and military aircraft, creating atomic power plants and introducing "electronic" brains to business applications. New discoveries of oil in the Canadian prairies led to the development of a petrochemical industry. Technological advances led to an industrial sector able to handle all aspects of production of many "made in Canada" products.

Although production and export of commodities such as pulp and paper are still essential to a strong economy, Canadian industry is able to diversify to produce a multitude of domestic items such as pots and pans, washing machines, television sets and bicycles. Far from the industrial centres, new communities have grown up in the suburbs. With industrial development, life in Canada continues to change with a steadily growing prosperity and workers benefitting with more security, shorter hours and a safer, more pleasant workplace.

== Production ==
Industrial Canada was part of the NFB's Canada Carries On series of documentary short films for CBC Television. Most postwar programs dealt with contemporary issues in Canada. The film was a compilation documentary edited to provide a coherent story, that relied heavily on newsreel material in order to provide the background to the dialogue. (Note: Excerpts from other NFB documentaries such as Target - Berlin and Screaming Jets were featured.) Additional footage was shot for the film by an NFB team of cinematographer Reginald Morris and sound engineer George Croll. Final sound editing in the studio was undertaken by Stuart Baker and Donald Douglas.

== Reception ==
Industrial Canada was primarily made-for-television on the CBC, and after broadcast, the film was made available on 16 mm to schools, libraries and other interested parties. The film was also made available to film libraries operated by university and provincial authorities.
