= Canada Carries On =

Series of short films by the National Film Board of Canada

Canada Carries On (French: En avant Canada) was a series of short films by the National Film Board of Canada which ran from 1940 to 1959. The series was created as morale-boosting propaganda films during the Second World War. With the end of the war, the series lost its financial backing from the Wartime Information Board, but continued as an NFB series of theatrical shorts that included newsreels as well as animated shorts.

The series was initially produced by Stuart Legg, who also directed many of the early films. The first film in the series was Legg's Atlantic Patrol, released in April 1940, about the Royal Canadian Navy's role in protecting convoys from Halifax to the United Kingdom from U-boat attack. One of the most famous films from this series was his Churchill's Island, released in Canada in June 1941 and winner of the first Academy Award for Best Documentary (Short Subject).

The narrator for many of the films in the series was Lorne Greene, known for his work on radio broadcasts as a news announcer at CBC. His sonorous recitation led to his nickname, "The Voice of Canada", and when reading grim battle statistics, "The Voice of Doom".

The success of Canada Carries On inspired a second NFB series, The World in Action, which was more tailored to international audiences.

== Canadian distribution ==
The series was produced in 16mm for the theatrical market. Each film was shown in approximately 800 theatres across Canada over a six-month period. They were distributed by Columbia Pictures, and the NFB had an arrangement with Famous Players theatres to ensure that Canadians from coast to coast could see them. After the six-month theatrical tour ended, the films were made available on 16 mm to schools, libraries, church basements and factories, extending their life for another year or two. They were also made available to film libraries operated by university and provincial authorities. A total of 199 films were produced before the series ended in 1959.

=== En avant Canada ===
The French-language series En avant Canada was distributed in Quebec and New Brunswick by France Film Distribution in some 60 theatres. Eight to 12 films were produced each year in French; some were versions of English titles, others original, for a total of 173 French titles before the program's end in 1959.

== International distribution ==
Some films were distributed internationally in Australia, the UK and the United States (by Telenews), in India (by Fox Film Corporation) and the West Indies (by Inter-continental). These were usually titles that dealt with international rather than Canadian issues. One such film was Warclouds in the Pacific, released just one week before the attack on Pearl Harbor, warning of an imminent Japanese attack.

== Films in series ==
=== 1940 ===
Title	Director	Producer	Length
Atlantic Patrol	Stuart Legg	Stuart Legg	10 min.
The Children from Overseas	Ruby Grierson; Stanley Hawes	Stuart Legg	10 min.
The Front of Steel	John McDougall	Stuart Legg	11 min.
The Home Front	Stanley Hawes	Stanley Hawes	11 min.
Letter from Aldershot	John Taylor	Stuart Legg	9 min.
Squadron 992	Harry Watt	Alberto Cavalcanti	23 min.
Un du 22e	Gerald Noxon	Stuart Legg	22 min.
Wings of Youth	Raymond Spottiswoode	Stuart Legg	19 min.

=== 1941 ===
Title	Director	Producer	Length
The Battle of Brains	Stanley Hawes	Stuart Legg	13 min.
Britain at Bay	Harry Watt		7 min.
Churchill's Island	Stuart Legg	Stuart Legg	22 min.
Everywhere in the World	Stuart Legg	Stuart Legg	16 min
Food - Weapon of Conquest	Stuart Legg	Stuart Legg	22 min.
Guards of the North	Raymond Spottiswoode		10 min.
Heroes of the Atlantic	J. D. Davidson	Stanley Hawes	15 min.
Letter from Camp Borden	Raymond Spottiswoode	Stuart Legg	17 min.
Soldiers All	Stuart Legg	Stuart Legg	20 min.
Strategy of Metals	Raymond Spottiswoode	Stuart Legg	19 min.
Warclouds in the Pacific	Stuart Legg	Stuart Legg	20 min.
Wings of a Continent	Raymond Spottiswoode	Stuart Legg	16 min.

=== 1942 ===
Title	Director	Producer	Length
The Battle for Oil	Stuart Legg	Raymond Spottiswoode	19 min.
The Battle of the Harvests	Stanley Jackson	James Beveridge	18 min.
Forward Commandos	Raymond Spottiswoode	Stanley Hawes	22 min.
Geopolitik - Hitler's Plan for Empire	Stuart Legg	Stuart Legg	20 min.
High Over the Borders	Raymond Spottiswoode	Irving Jacoby	23 min.
Inside Fighting Canada	Jane Marsh	James Beveridge	11 min.
Quebec – Path of Conquest	Radford Crawley	Raymond Spottiswoode	11 min.
Road to Tokyo		Raymond Spottiswoode	10 min.
This Is Blitz	Stuart Legg		22 min.
The Voice of Action	James Beveridge	Raymond Spottiswoode	16 min.
Women Are Warriors	Jane Marsh	Raymond Spottiswoode	14 min.

=== 1943 ===
Title	Director	Producer	Length
Banshees Over Canada	James Beveridge	Sydney Newman	19 min.
Coal Face, Canada	Robert Edmonds	Graham McInnes	20 min.
Fighting Norway	Sydney Newman		10 min.
The Gates of Italy	Stuart Legg; Tom Daly	Stuart Legg; Tom Daly	21 min.
Pincer on Axis Europe			20 min.
Proudly She Marches	Jane Marsh	Raymond Spottiswoode	18 min.
Thought for Food	Stanley Jackson	James Beveridge	15 min.
Tomorrow's World		Raymond Spottiswoode	20 min.
Train Busters	Sydney Newman	Raymond Spottiswoode	13 min.
Up from the Ranks	Julian Roffman	Raymond Spottiswoode	19 min.

=== 1944 ===
Title	Director	Producer	Length
Air Cadets	Jane Marsh		15 min
Break-through		James Beveridge	11 min.
Fighting Sea-Fleas	Sydney Newman; Julian Roffman; Nicholas Read	Sydney Newman; Julian Roffman; Nicholas Read	11 min.
Flight 6	Sydney Newman	Guy Glover	10 min.
Future for Fighters		Stuart Legg; James Beveridge	10 min.
Look to the North	James Beveridge	James Beveridge	22 min.
Mosquito Squadron		Ernest Borneman	11 min.
Target - Berlin	Ernest Borneman	Raymond Spottiswoode	15 min.
Trans-Canada Express	Stanley Hawes	Stanley Hawes	19 min., 26 sec.
Universities at War			11 min.
U.N.R.R.A. presents In the Wake of the Armies ...	Guy Glover		18 min.
Wounded in Action			22 min.
Zero Hour		Stuart Legg	22 min.

=== 1945 ===
Title	Director	Producer	Length
Atlantic Crossroads	Tom Daly	Grant McLean; Tom Daly	10 min.
Back to Jobs	Nicholas Balla		9 min., 35 sec.
Gateway to Asia	Tom Daly	Tom Daly	21 min.
Headline Hunters		Alan Field	11 min.
Music in the Wind		Guy Glover	10 min.
Ordeal by Ice	Tom Daly	Tom Daly	10 min., 39 sec.
Road to the Reich	Tom Daly	Tom Daly	10 min.
Salute to a Victory			10 min.
Suffer Little Children	Sydney Newman	Sydney Newman	1o min.
This Is Our Canada	Stanley Jackson	Stanley Jackson	20 min
Toronto Symphony No. 1	Julian Roffman	Alan Field	12 min
Toronto Symphony No. 2	Julian Roffman	Alan Field	9 min
The War on Want	Gordon Burwash	Nicholas Balla	15 min

=== 1946 ===
Title	Director	Producer	Length
Bronco Busters		Laurence Hyde	10 min.
Canada, World Trader		Tom Daly	11 min
The Challenge of Housing		Tom Daly	10 min.
A City Sings	Gudrun Parker	Nicholas Balla; Sydney Newman	11 min.
Everyman's World		Sydney Newman	10 min.
Fashions by Canada			11 min.
The New North	Hamilton Wright	Sydney Newman	10 min.
Science Goes Fishing	Jean Palardy	Guy Glover	11 min.
Ski Skill	Bernard Devlin; Roger Blais	Sydney Newman	10 min.
Small Fry	Jack Olsen	Sydney Newman	10 min.
To the Ladies		Nicholas Balla	10 min.
Voice of Canada		Guy Glover	10 min.
White Safari	Hugh Wallace	Sydney Newman	11 min.

=== 1947 ===
Title	Director	Producer	Length
Canada Dances	Nicholas Balla	Sydney Newman	9 min.
Careers and Cradles	Jack Olsen	Sydney Newman	11 mn.
Eyes on Canada			11 min.
Johnny at the Fair	Jack Olsen	Sydney Newman	11 min.
Mexico Today			10 min.
Montreal by Night	Jean Palardy; Arthur Burrows	Sydney Newman	11 min.
Peoples of Canada (revised)	James Beveridge	Sydney Newman	11 min.
River Watch	Roger Morin	Sydney Newman	11 min.
Tomorrow's Citizens	Gordon Weisenborn	Stuart Legg	11 min.
What's on Your Mind?	Jack Olsen	Sydney Newman	11 min.

=== 1948 ===
Title	Director	Producer	Length
Arctic Jungle	Sydney Newman	Sydney Newman	11 min.
Art for Everybody	Laurence Hyde	Sydney Newman	10 min.
Champions in the Making		Sydney Newman	11 min.
The Home Town Paper	Morten Parker	Gudrun Parker	23 min.
Inside the Atom	Jack Olsen	Sydney Newman	11 min
It's Fun to Sing	Roger Blais	Sydney Newman	11 min.
Maps We Live By	Gudrun Parker	James Beveridge	11 min.
Mercy Flight	Evelyn Spice Cherry; Lawrence Cherry	Evelyn Spice Cherry; Lawrence Cherry	11 min.
Pay-Off in Pain	Robert Anderson	Sydney Newman	11 min.
Science in Bloom	Nicholas Balla	Sydney Newman	10 min.

=== 1949 ===
Title	Director	Producer	Length
55,000 for Breakfast	Lawrence Cherry; Evelyn Spice Cherry	Lawrence Cherry; Evelyn Spice Cherry	11 min.
Ballet Festival	Roger Blais	Don Mulholland	11 min.
A Capital Plan	Bernard Devlin	Sydney Newman	11 min.
Famous Fish I Have Met	Jack Olsen	Sydney Newman	11 min.
Passport to Canada	Roger Blais	Sydney Newman	11 min.
Red Runs the Fraser	E. Taylor	Sydney Newman	11 min.
Sight and Sound	Gudrun Parker; Nathan Clavier	Don Mulholland	11 min.
Summer Is For Kids	Stanley Jackson	Sydney Newman	11 min., 42 sec.
Valley of Gold	David Bairstow	Don Mulholland	10 min.
Welcome, Neighbour!	Leslie McFarlane	Sydney Newman	11 min.
What's Under the Label?	Ron Weyman	Don Mulholland	11 min.
White Fortress	Leslie McFarlane; Ron Weyman	Don Mulholland	10 min.

=== 1950 ===
Title	Director	Producer	Length
City in Siege	James Parker; Allen Stark	Sydney Newman	17 min.
Cliff Hangers		Don Mulholland	10 min., 27 sec.
Gentleman Jekyll and Driver Hyde	David Bairstow	Don Mulholland	8 min., 18 sec.
Hunters of the North Pole	Nils Rasmussen	Don Mulholland	10 min.
Life Under A Leaf	Ron Weyman	Don Mulholland	30 min.
Our Town is the World	Stanley Jackson	Don Mulholland	11 min.
Snow Fiesta	Harry Foster	Harry Foster	10 min.
Thunder in the East	Douglas Tunstell	Sydney Newman	11 min.
Unto the Hundredth Generation	Donald Fraser	Don Mulholland	11 min.

=== 1951 ===
Title	Director	Producer	Length
After Prison, What?	Ron Weyman	Sydney Newman	11 min., 29 sec.
Cadet Holiday	David Bairstow; Robert Humble; Douglas Wilkinson	Sydney Newman; Michael Spencer	11 min.
Flying Skis	Harry Foster	Harry Foster	9 min.
Gangway for Navy	Jack Olsen	Sydney Newman	11 min.
Inside Newfoundland	Sydney Newman; Roger Morin	Sydney Newman	11 min.
It's The Fashion!	Ron Weyman	Sydney Newman	11 min.
The Man in the Peace Tower	Roger Blais	Sydney Newman	10 min.
The Outlaw Within	Morten Parker	Guy Glover	11 min.
Penitentiary	Ron Weyman	Sydney Newman	11 min.
Rescue Mission	Ron Weyman	Sydney Newman	11 min.
Screaming Jets	Jack Olsen	Sydney Newman	11 min.
Struggle for Oil	Ronald Dick	Sydney Newman	11 min.
Talent Showcase	Roger Blais; Douglas Tunstell; Sydney Newman	Sydney Newman	10 min., 45 sec.
Toronto Boom Town	Leslie McFarlane	Sydney Newman	10 min.
Yoho: Wonder Valley	Roger Blais; Jack Olsen	Sydney Newman	11 min.

=== 1952 ===
Title	Director	Producer	Length
Arctic Saga	Douglas Wilkinson	Nicholas Balla	11 mn.
Beyond the Frontier	Ronald Dick	Nicholas Balla	11 min.
Canada's Atom Goes To Work	Roger Blais	Guy Glover	11 min.
Horizons of Quebec	Raymond Garceau	Guy Glover	11 min.
The Mountain Movers	Ron Weyman	Nicholas Balla	11 min.
The Romance of Transportation in Canada	Colin Low	Tom Daly	11 min., 20 sec.
Singing Champions	Roger Blais	Nicholas Balla	10 min.
Winter Week-end (Revised)	Bernard Devlin	Guy Glover	10 min., 23 sec.
Singing Champions	Julian Biggs	Michael Spencer	16 min.

=== 1953 ===
Title	Director	Producer	Length
Citizen Varek	Gordon Burwash	Nicholas Balla	11 min.
Farewell Oak Street	Grant McLean	Gordon Burwash	17 min.
Germany - Key to Europe		Nicholas Balla	21 min.
The Harbour	Earnest Kirkpatrick	Nicholas Balla	9 min.
Here's Hockey!	Leslie McFarlane	Nicholas Balla	10 min., 40 sed.
Herring Hunt	Julian Biggs	Guy Glover	10 min., 47 sec.
In Search of Home	Roger Blais	Nicholas Balla	11 min.
Inland Seaport	Ron Weyman	Nicholas Balla	11 min.
Mission Ship	Robert Anderson	Nicholas Balla	11 min.
Mister Mayor	Raymond Garceau	Roger Blais	11 min.
Tempest in Town	Raymond Garceau	Bernard Devlin	13 min.
Today in South Asia	Donald Fraser	Donald Fraser	11 min.
The Wind-Swept Isles	Jean Palardy	Bernard Devlin	9 min., 50 sec.
The World at Your Feet (Revised)	Larry Gosnell	Michael Spencer	10 min.

=== 1954 ===
Title	Director	Producer	Length
Bottleneck	Leslie McFarlane		11 min.
British Empire and Commonwealth Games	Jack Olsen	Nicholas Balla	11 min.
Bush Doctor	Jean Palardy	Roger Blais	10 min., 48 sec.
College in the Wilds	Julian Biggs	Guy Glover	10 min.
Corral	Colin Low	Tom Daly	11 min., 27 sed.
Diggers of the Deeps	Grant McLean		
Sorel	Jean Palardy	Roger Blais	11 min.
Thousand Million Years		Tom Daly	10 min
Vigil in the North	Fergus McDonell	Nicholas Balla	11 min

=== 1955 ===
Title	Director	Producer	Length
The Dykes	Roger Blais	Roger Blais	9 min., 52 sec.
Gold	Colin Low	Tom Daly	10 min., 32 sec.
Harvest in the Valley (short version)	Larry Gosnell	Larry Gosnell	8 min
High Tide in Newfoundland	Grant McLean	Nicholas Balla	21 min.
The Jolifou Inn	Colin Low	Tom Daly	10 min., 47 sec.
The Lumberjack	Jean Palardy	Roger Blais	29 min.
The Maple Leaf	J. V. Durden	J. V. Durden	9 min., 33 sec.
Needles and Pins	Roger Blais	Roger Blais	11 min
Problem Clinic	Ron Weyman	Nicholas Balla	12 min.
Return of the Indian	Grant McLean	Nicholas Balla	11 min.

=== 1956 ===
Title	Director	Producer	Length
Fishermen of Pubnico	Léonard Forest	Victor Jobin	10 min., 32 sec.
Frontiers to Guard	Ian MacNeill	Nicholas Balla	17 min.
The Lively Pond		Nicholas Balla	8 min., 41 sec.
The Shepherd	Julian Biggs	Julian Biggs	11 min.

=== 1957 ===
Title	Director	Producer	Length
Bridge Under the Ocean	Raymond Garceau	Nicholas Balla	11 min.
Carnival in Quebec	Jean Palardy	Roger Blais	12 min., 13 sec.
Snow Fighters	Leslie McFarlane	Roger Blais	10 min.
Wildlife of the Rocky Mountains	William H. Carrick		8 min., 40 sec.

=== 1958 ===
Title	Director	Producer	Length
The Awakening Mackenzie	Hector Lemieux	John Howe	9 min.
Fraser's River	Gordon Sparling	Stanley Hawes	14 min., 38 sec.
Industrial Canada	Guy L. Coté	Guy L. Coté	18 min., 27 sec.
The Man From Karachi	Leslie McFarlane	Nicholas Balla	12 min.
Songs of Nova Scotia	Grant Crabtree	Roger Blais	11 min.
Street to the World	Louis-Georges Carrier		14 min., 33 sec.
Treasure of the Forest	Roger Blais	Nicholas Balla	12 min., 50 sec.
The World on Show	Roger Blais	Tim Wilson	13 min.

=== 1959 ===
Title	Director	Producer	Length
The Atom - Servant of Man	Edmund Reid	Nicholas Balla; Grant McLean	14 min.
The Chairmaker and the Boys		Tim Wilson	20 min., 3 sec.
The Magic Mineral	Roger Blais	Tim Wilson	13 min., 20 sec.
Man of Music	Roger Blais	Tim Wilson	18 min., 13 sec.
The Modern Prospector	Jean-Yves Bigras	Tim Wilson	14 min., 27 sec.
Portrait of Canada	Hector Lemieux	Tim Wilson	10 min.
Railroaders	Guy L. Coté	Nicholas Balla	16 min., 55 sec.
Wheat Country	Roger Blais	Roger Blais	20 min., 2 sec.

=== 1960 ===
Title	Director	Producer	Length
Railroaders (revised)	Guy L. Coté	Nicholas Balla	16 min., 55 sec.
