= Tomorrow's World (film) =

- Theatrical poster by Harry "Mayo" Mayerovitch, 1943
- Produced by: Raymond Spottiswoode
- Edited by: Ernest Borneman
- Production company: National Film Board of Canada
- Distributed by: Columbia Pictures of Canada
- Release date: 1943
- Running time: 20 minutes
- Country: Canada
- Language: English

Tomorrow's World is a 20-minute 1943 Canadian documentary film, made by the National Film Board of Canada (NFB) as part of the wartime Canada Carries On series. The film, produced by Raymond Spottiswoode, described the importance of conservation and rationing during the Second World War, and how the world would be more prosperous and better planned because of the war efforts. The French version of Tomorrow's World is titled Le Monde de demain.

== Synopsis ==
During the Second World War, by 1943, shortages in food and resources begin to affect all warring nations. In Nazi Germany, conditions harken back to the desperate years in the First World War and shortly after, when ordinary citizens were impoverished and forced to severely curtail their food intake. In Russia, families have to contend with the widespread destruction of their homes and farms. Bomb-scarred Great Britain survives by instituting strict rationing of food and conservation of strategic goods along with efforts to salvage metal in both domestic and industrial programs.

Even in affluent North America, the home front has been transformed by the exigencies of a "total war". While households may face the inevitable shortages, "tightening" the belt" has resulted in industrial production turned to arms manufacturing. Munitions factories are turning out the weapons of war for not only the United States and Canada, but also for faraway battlefields in China and Russia.

The massive amount of over-production of goods has western leaders cautioning that the Great Depression was caused by greed and poor planning. In order to avoid repeating the economic crisis, careful planning has to take place. To ensure victory, an all-inclusive program of sharing, conservation, salvage and rationing has been seen in every aspect of life. The scrap metal drives are only one of the examples of this new attitude.

With the forces of the New World about to collide with those of the Old World, the Axis powers build up their defences using forced labour. Across Northwest Europe, the "Maginot mentality" begins to take root as the Axis turns its occupied territory into Fortress Europe. The Allies realize that victory over the Axis powers will release the industrial might that was mobilized for war.

As war production turns to peace needs, a glimpse of the future can be seen in the advances of aviation where new inventions such as the helicopter and streamlined, long distance, high performance transports will become commonplace. In Canada's north, U.S. Army engineers along with Canadian workers created the Alaska Highway or ALCAN Highway, carved out of the northern bush and forest to bring American troops and supplies northward. The same staging route important for war will also become a vital peacetime link to the north.

When the future is clear, the needs of its citizens will be met by the prudent utilization of the finite resources of the world, with an understanding that production to create extravagances and wealth is wrong. The construction of new power plants, factories and infrastructure depends on governments converting from a wartime footing to that of peace. With science harnessed to solve the problems of agriculture, wartime leaders of the Western world have to face the challenge of not only feeding its own people, but also during the postwar years, the inevitable need to feed hundreds of millions across the globe.

== Production ==
Typical of the NFB's Second World War documentary short films in the Canada Carries On series, Tomorrow's World was made in cooperation with the Director of Public Information, Herbert Lash. The film was created as a morale boosting propaganda film. Tomorrow's World, used compilation documentary techniques incorporating newsreel material in the initial scenes, along with combat footage from both Allied and Axis sources. (Note: Enemy footage was provided care of the Alien Property Custodian.)

The deep baritone voice of stage actor Lorne Greene was featured in the narration of Tomorrow's World. Greene, known for his work on both radio broadcasts as a news announcer at CBC as well as narrating many of the Canada Carries On series. His sonorous recitation led to his nickname, "The Voice of Canada", and to some observers, the "Voice-of-God". When reading grim battle statistics or narrating a particularly serious topic, he was known as "The Voice of Doom".

== Reception ==
Tomorrow's World was produced in 35 mm for the theatrical market. Each film in the Canada Carries On series was shown over a six-month period as part of the shorts or newsreel segments in approximately 800 theatres across Canada. The NFB had an arrangement with Famous Players theatres to ensure that Canadians from coast-to-coast could see them, with further distribution by Columbia Pictures.

After the six-month theatrical tour ended, individual films were made available on 16 mm to schools, libraries, churches and factories, extending the life of these films for another year or two. They were also made available to film libraries operated by university and provincial authorities. A total of 199 films were produced before the series was canceled in 1959.

== See also ==
- The Home Front (1940), a NFB documentary on the home fronts in the Second World War.
- Food - Weapon of Conquest (1942), a NFB documentary on the use of food as a weapon of war in the Second World War.
- Look to the North (1944), a NFB documentary on the development of Canada's north in the Second World War.
