= Thunder in the East =

Thunder in the East may refer to:

- Thunder in the East (1934 film)
- Thunder in the East (1951 film)
- Thunder in the East (album), by Japanese heavy metal band Loudness
- Thunder in the East (1950 film), a 1950 Canadian short film in the Canada Carries On series
