= Cadet Holiday =

- Opening title
- Directed by: David Bairstow; Robert Humble; Douglas Wilkinson
- Written by: David Bairstow
- Produced by: Sydney Newman; Michael Spencer
- Narrated by: John Drainie
- Cinematography: Robert Humble; Robert Campbell
- Edited by: Nicholas Balla; Horace Clarke
- Music by: Robert Fleming
- Production company: National Film Board of Canada
- Distributed by: Columbia Pictures of Canada
- Release date: 1951; (Note: The NFB production date indicates 1950.)
- Running time: 11 minutes
- Country: Canada
- Language: English

Cadet Holiday is an 11-minute 1951 Canadian documentary film, made by the National Film Board of Canada (NFB) as part of the postwar Canada Carries On series. The film, directed by David Bairstow, Robert Humble and Douglas Wilkinson, was produced by Sydney Newman and Michael Spencer. Cadet Holiday was an account of a Canadian Army Cadet during a summer camp. The film's French version title is Cadets en vacances.

== Synopsis ==
In 1950, during the annual six-week summer camp for the Royal Canadian Army Cadets, cadets are chosen from cadet corps throughout Canada, for a variety of training programs. Camp Ipperwash, the Canadian Army training facility located in Lambton County, near Kettle Point, Ontario, serves as a cadet summer training centre (CSTC), one of five similar camps in Canada.

Cadet Ron Williams is one of 20 cadets from the Springfield High Army Cadet Corps in Hamilton, Ontario, chosen for a motor mechanic's course at Camp Ipperwash. (Note: In 1951, there were army cadet corps in 400 high schools in Canada.) For the 1,000 cadets in the summer camp, the first days are taken up in drawing the "kit" (bedding, boots and coveralls), settling into barrack life and checking out the various pieces of army equipment at the base, including 25-pounders and Sherman M4A2 (76)W HVSS tanks. Course work on machinery, communications, weapons, motor transport and infantry tactics, are interspersed with field exercises that teach the cadets about camouflage, scouting and weapons handling. Due to its proximity to Lake Huron, cadets at Camp Ipperwash also receive a regular 45-minute swimming and life-saving lesson each day, and are always paired up with a partner for safety.

For Cadet Williams, after completion of his initial training, he was placed in charge of 30 CMP trucks moved cross-country in convoy. An error in map-reading, however, led to his re-routing the convoy into Lake Huron. Despite this mishap, Williams successfully completed his advanced training and graduated. In showing off his prowess with mechanized vehicles, his misplaced bravado leads him to start up a Sherman tank, but after a brief overland run, the sergeant major in charge of the summer camp, puts an end to the unauthorized excursion.

When his family comes to pick him up, Cadet Williams redeems himself by using his new found knowledge of mechanics to start their balky car. He ends his repair with a declaration, "Carry on, driver!"

== Production ==
Typical of the NFB's postwar documentary short films in the Canada Carries On series, Cadet Holiday was based on an account of contemporary culture in Canada. On-location photography at Camp Ipperwash was completed by the camera crew of Robert Humble and Robert Campbell with sound editing by Peter Jones and Clarke Daprato.

== Reception ==
Cadet Holiday was produced in 35 mm for the theatrical market. The NFB had an arrangement with Famous Players theatres to ensure that Canadians from coast-to-coast could see them, with further distribution by Columbia Pictures.

Individual films were also made available on 16 mm to schools, libraries, churches and factories, extending the life of these films for another year or two. They were also made available to film libraries operated by university and provincial authorities. A total of 199 films were produced before the series was canceled in 1959.
