= Flight 6 =

Flight 6 or Flight 006 may refer to the following aviation incidents or significant flights:

- Pan Am Flight 6, around-the-world flight on 16 October 1956
- China Airlines Flight 006, aircraft upset on 19 February 1985
- Grand Canyon Airlines Flight 6, crashed 18 June 1986
- Singapore Airlines Flight 006, crashed on 31 October 2000
- UPS Airlines Flight 6, caught fire on 3 September 2010
- Starship flight test 6, a successful flight of the SpaceX Starship rocket in November 2024

== Other uses ==
- Flight 6 (film), a 1944 documentary by the National Film Board of Canada
