= Michael Spencer (producer) =

Canadian film director

Michael Spencer (November 9, 1919 – April 22, 2016) was a Canadian film producer, most noted for his tenure as the first executive director of the Canadian Film Development Corporation.

Born in London, England, in 1919, Spencer came to Canada in 1939 to visit relatives in British Columbia; however, when the outbreak of World War II complicated his attempt to return home, he moved to Ottawa, Ontario, to take a job with the nascent National Film Board of Canada. Initially a cameraman, he later became a director and producer of NFB documentaries; by the 1960s, he was a key planning executive with the organization.

In 1966, the NFB asked him to establish a new system for funding Canadian feature films; his proposals led to the establishment of the CFDC, now known as Telefilm Canada, and Spencer was named the first director of the organization.

The overall effect of his influence on Canadian film has been debated; most notably, it was at his behest that the government increased the Capital Cost Allowance tax credit from 60 per cent to 100 per cent in 1974, which unwittingly spawned the "tax shelter era" in Canadian film history. He also unsuccessfully advocated for Canadian film to be funded in part by a surtax on box office sales in Canadian movie theatres, and for Canadian content quotas requiring a certain number of theatre screens to be devoted to showing Canadian films.

He left the CFDC in 1978, and subsequently launched Film Finance Canada, a completion bonding firm. In 1980, he served on the feature film jury at the 1980 Cannes Film Festival.

In 2003 he and Suzan Ayscough published the book Hollywood North: Creating the Canadian Motion Picture Industry, a memoir of his career with the NFB and the CFDC.

== Awards ==
In 1989 he was named a Member of the Order of Canada.

In 1992 he was the recipient of a special Genie Award for outstanding contributions to the Canadian film industry at the 13th Genie Awards; he used his speech to criticize the government for doing too little to ensure that Canadian films could actually get widespread distribution in theatres. In 2004, the Canadian Society of Cinematographers named him as the recipient of its Bill Hilson Award for lifetime achievement in Canadian cinema.

== Filmography ==
- Maple Sugar Time, 1941 - cinematographer
- Peace River, 1941 - co-director and co-producer with James Beveridge
- The Safety Supervisor, 1946 - producer
- Bluebloods from Canada, 1948 - producer
- The Navy Files, 1948 - co-producer with Robert Anderson
- Royal Canadian Infantry Corps, 1948 - producer
- Stuff for Stuff, 1948 - co-producer with Philip Ragan
- Arctic Dog Team, 1949 - producer
- Birds Near Home, 1949 - producer)
- Birds of Canada No. 3, 1949 - producer
- Birds of Canada No. 4, 1949 - producer
- Birds of Canada No. 5, 1949 - producer
- 1867 and After, 1950 - producer
- 4 Songs by 4 Gentlemen, 1950 - producer
- Birds of Canada No. 6, 1950 - producer
- Business in the Mail Bag, 1950 - producer
- Cadet Holiday, 1950 - co-producer with Sydney Newman
- Date of Birth, 1950 - producer
- The Gentle Art of Film Projection, 1950 - producer
- Historic Highway, Lower Canada, 1950 - producer
- Historic Highway, Upper Canada, 1950 - producer
- How to Build an Igloo, 1950 - producer
- The Royal Canadian Corps of Signals, 1950 - producer
- Teamwork: Past and Present, 1950 - producer
- Birds of Canada's Mountain Parks, 1951 - producer
- Birds of Prince Albert Park, 1951 - producer
- Birds of the Seashore, 1951 - producer
- Mammals of Canada's Mountain Parks, 1951 - producer
- Mammals of Canada's Prairie Playground, 1951 - producer
- Milk-Made, 1951 - producer
- Royal Canadian Army Cadets, 1951 - co-producer with Sydney Newman
- Oyster Man, 1951 - producer
- Stagecoach to the Stars, 1951 - producer
- Stamp of Approval, 1951 - producer
- Land of the Long Day, 1952 - producer
- Maps for the Army, 1952 - producer
- The Son, 1952 - producer
- Snow Goose, 1952 - producer
- Tomorrow's Officers, 1952 - producer
- Western Wheat, 1952 - producer
- With the Canadians in Korea, 1952 - producer
- Angotee: Story of an Eskimo Boy, 1953 - producer
- Birds of the Prairie Marshes, 1953 - writer; producer
- Miniature Range Tank Gunnery, 1953 - producer
- Point Pelee: Nature Sanctuary, 1953 - producer
- R.C.E.M.E. Workshop in the Field, 1953 - producer
- Royal Canadian Ordinance Corps: Field Operations, 1953 - producer
- Security Depends on You, 1953 - producer
- Some Familiar Birds, 1953 - producer
- The World at Your Feet, 1953 - producer
- You're on Parade, 1953 - producer
- The Honest Truth, 1954 - producer
- Men in Armour, 1954 - producer
- The Lively Pond, 1956 - writer
- World in a Marsh, 1956 - writer; producer
- Frontiers in Science, 1964 - director
- The Temptations of Big Bear, 1985 - executive producer
