= Headline Hunters (1945 film) =

- Title frame
- Produced by: Alan Field
- Narrated by: Lorne Greene; Tommy Tweed
- Production company: National Film Board of Canada
- Distributed by: National Film Board of Canada; Columbia Pictures of Canada
- Release date: 1945
- Running time: 11 minutes
- Country: Canada
- Language: English

Headline Hunters is an 11-minute 1945 Canadian documentary film, part of the wartime Canada Carries On series, produced by Alan Field. The short film was made by the National Film Board of Canada. The film was a tribute to Canadian war correspondents who reported from the front lines in the Second World War.

== Synopsis ==
From the first days of the Second World War, broadcasters and journalists brought the latest war news back to a public in Canada desperate for any news. All the major news outlets sent war correspondents who would report from the front lines, often putting themselves in danger. All the significant Canadian operations overseas from the Battle of Britain, Battle of the Atlantic, Mediterranean and North Africa as well as the Normandy landings have had front-line coverage from Canadian war correspondents.

Besides the headline hunters who wrote for newspapers, the Canadian Broadcasting Corporation (CBC) and National Film Board of Canada (NFB) send teams of cinematographers and broadcasters producing radio and newsreel broadcasts. Wherever Canadians are in battle. the war correspondents can be found flying with the Royal Canadian Air Force, on the seas with the Royal Canadian Navy or in an armoured vehicle with the Canadian Army,

In order to relay the war news from the front, a complex organization is behind the correspondents from the military Directors of Public Relations, the censors, dispatch riders, engineers, and the Canadian Press and British United Press offices. Close cooperation with their counterparts in the Canadian military is also crucial to getting the news back to Canada.

== Cast ==
- Journalist Ross Munro as Himself (archival footage)
- Journalist Ralph Allen as Himself (archival footage)
- Journalist Lionel Shapiro Allen Kent as Himself (archival footage)
- Journalist Gregory Clark as Himself (archival footage)
- Wing Commander Joe Clarke as Himself (archival footage)
- Colonel William Abel as Himself (archival footage)
- Colonel Dick Malone as Himself (archival footage)
- Colonel Frank Walker as Himself (archival footage)
- Commander Peter McWitchey as Himself (archival footage)
- Journalist Matthew Halton as Himself (archival footage)
- Journalist Peter Stursberg as Himself (archival footage) (Note: The voices of Matthew Halton, Benoit Lafleur and Bill Herbert are heard on a CBC radio broadcast.)

== Production ==
Typical of many of the NFB's Second World War documentary short films, Headline Hunters was created as an information film with a limited propaganda message. The film was a compilation documentary that incorporated newsreel footage shot by the Canadian armed forces, especially, the Canadian Army Film and Photo Unit in Great Britain and other Allied film units. Headline Hunters also included footage shot specifically for the film that featured a large number of war correspondents.

Stage actor Lorne Greene was featured in The Voice of Action. Greene was known for his work on radio broadcasts as a news announcer at CBC, as well as narrating many of the Canada Carries On and The World in Action series, made up mainly of morale-boosting propaganda films. His sonorous recitation and deep baritone voice, led to his nicknames, "The Voice of Canada", "The Voice of Doom" and even, the "Voice-of-God".

== Reception ==
Headline Hunters was produced in 35 mm for the theatrical market. Each film was shown over a six-month period as part of the shorts or newsreel segments in approximately 800 theatres across Canada. The NFB had an arrangement with Famous Players theatres to ensure that Canadians from coast-to-coast could see them, with further distribution by Columbia Pictures.

Some films were also sold to individual theatres periodically. Columbia Pictures continued to distribute the series, with France Films handling its French counterpart, En Avant Canada, in Quebec and New Brunswick.

After the six-month theatrical tour ended, individual films were made available on 16 mm to schools, libraries, churches and factories, extending the life of these films for another year or two. They were also made available to film libraries operated by university and provincial authorities. A total of 199 films were produced before the series was canceled in 1959.

== See also ==
- The Voice of Action (1942)
- The War Is Over (1945)
- List of Allied propaganda films of World War II
