= Headline Hunters =

Headline Hunters may refer to:

- Headline Hunters (game show), a Canadian game show
- Headline Hunters (1945 film), a Canadian documentary film
- Headline Hunters (1955 film), an American crime film
- Headline Hunters (1968 film), a British drama film
