= Trans-Canada Express =

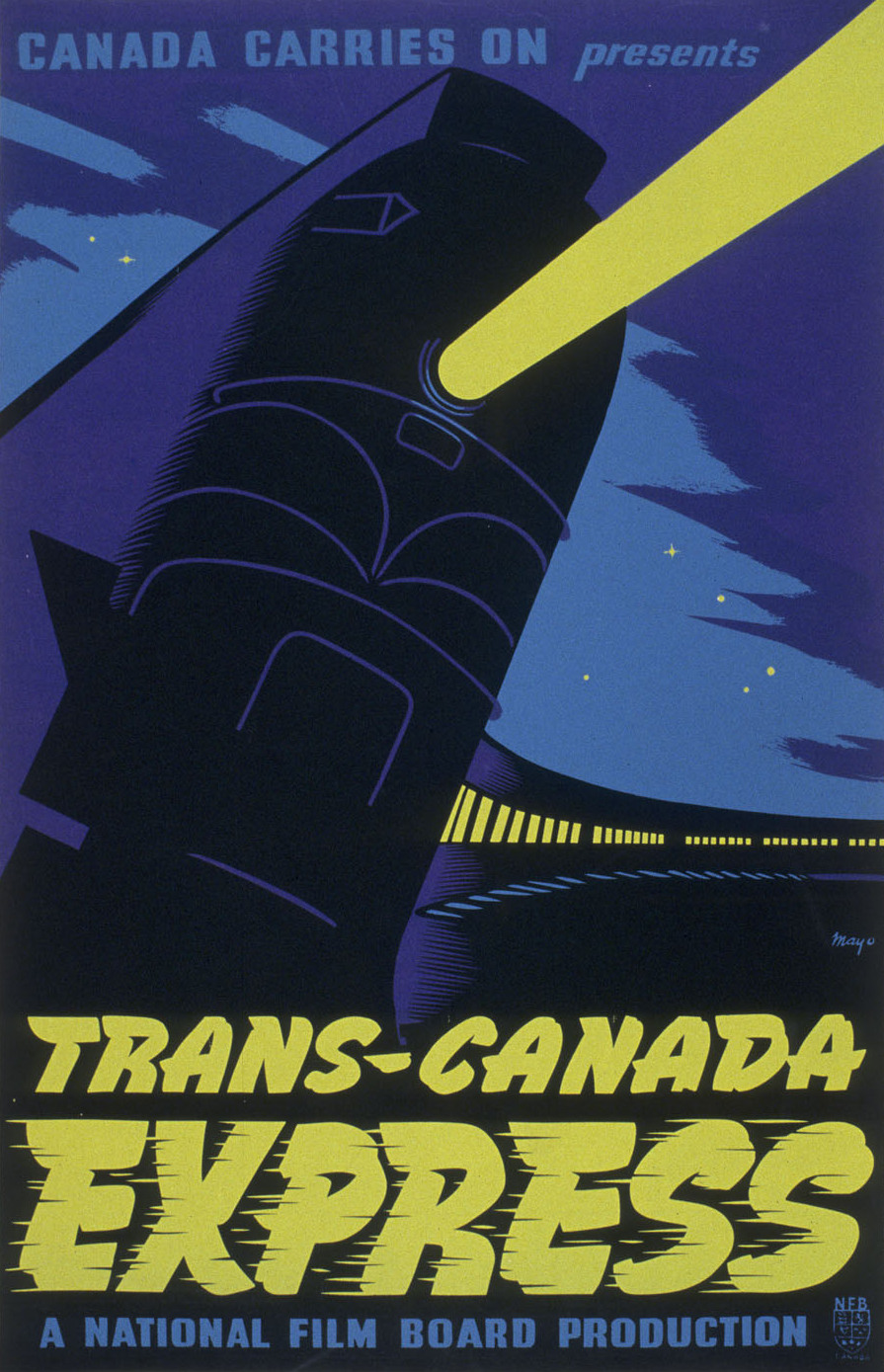
- Poster, ca. 1944
- Directed by: Stanley Hawes
- Produced by: Sydney Newman
- Narrated by: Lorne Greene
- Cinematography: Donald Fraser
- Music by: Lucio Agostini
- Production company: National Film Board of Canada
- Distributed by: National Film Board of Canada; Columbia Pictures of Canada
- Release date: 1944
- Running time: 19 minutes, 26 seconds
- Country: Canada
- Language: English

Trans-Canada Express is a 20-minute 1944 Canadian documentary film, made by the National Film Board of Canada (NFB) as part of the World War II Canada Carries On series. The film was produced by Sydney Newman and directed by Stanley Hawes. Trans-Canada Express documents the importance of the railroad in Canada, emphasizing the use of rail transport during World War II. The film's French version title is D'un océan à l'autre.

== Synopsis ==
In 1944, the 40,000 miles of railway track "weld together the natural and industrial might" of Canada. Railroads have always been important in Canada dating back to Lord Strathcona driving the final spike into the Canadian Pacific Railway (CPR) line that connected and conquered the vast distances of the country. Canada was "united by a bond of steel" and, for a century, brought the goods and people to all parts of the nation.

Over the years, rail transport in Canada have necessitated an immense infrastructure of train stations, roundhouses, turntables, freight yards and administrative centres. In cities or towns throughout the country, the train station often represents the livelihood and "heart" of community. With automobiles becoming more common as a means of passenger transport, railroads concentrated on freight delivery, but in 1939, when Canada declared war, rail transport was again essential.

Railroads have linked North America and its munitions factories, providing a key conduit for war matériel in World War II, but face a crisis in manpower. With 30,000 rail workers in uniform, retired workers and women have become part of the workforce. As Canada's war effort surges, the 150,000 railroad employees make up the country's largest wartime industry. The Canadian National Railway (CNR) and CPR harnessed their tremendous resources to react to the challenges ahead.

With the increases in both passengers and freight carried, and facing scarcities of equipment and personnel, routes are shortened and allocations of rolling stock are focused on war contingencies. The older rolling stock is overhauled with locomotives reconditioned and passenger compartments converted from parlour cars. Military requirements become the most important consideration in rail transport, with the urgent need to get troops and their equipment to the battlefields.

== Cast ==
- Dionne quintuplets as Themselves (archival footage)
- Lord Strathcona as himself (archival footage)
- A.G.L. McNaughton as himself (archival footage)
- Buster Keaton as himself (archival footage)

== Production ==
Title frame of the film.

Trans-Canada Express was part of the wartime Canada Carries On propaganda short film series. The film was produced with financial backing from the Wartime Information Board for the Director of Public Information, Herbert Lash.

Typical of the NFB's series of morale-boosting films, Trans-Canada Express used the format of a compilation documentary, relying heavily on newsreel material, including a sequence from Buster Keaton's The General (1926), as well as a re-enactment of Lord Strathcona driving the final spike into the Canadian Pacific Railway Line. (Note: Buster Keaton later appeared in a NFB film The Railrodder (1965).).

Along with other narration, the deep baritone voice of stage actor Lorne Greene was featured as a narrator in Trans-Canada Express. Greene, known for his work on both radio broadcasts as a news announcer at CBC as well as narrating many of the Canada Carries On series. His sonorous recitation led to his nickname, "The Voice of Canada", and to some observers, the "voice-of-God". When reading grim battle statistics or narrating a particularly serious topic, he was known as "The Voice of Doom".

== Reception ==
Trans-Canada Express was produced in 35 mm for the theatrical market. Each film in the Canada Carries On series was shown over a six-month period as part of the shorts or newsreel segments in approximately 800 theatres across Canada. The NFB had an arrangement with Famous Players theatres to ensure that Canadians from coast-to-coast could see them, with further distribution by Columbia Pictures.

After the six-month theatrical tour ended, individual films were made available on 16 mm to schools, libraries, churches and factories, extending the life of these films for another year or two. They were also made available to film libraries operated by university and provincial authorities. A total of 199 films were produced before the series was canceled in 1959.
