= Banshees Over Canada =

- Opening title
- Directed by: James Beveridge
- Produced by: Sydney Newman
- Narrated by: Lorne Greene
- Production company: National Film Board of Canada
- Distributed by: Columbia Pictures of Canada
- Release date: 1943
- Running time: 19 minutes
- Country: Canada
- Language: English

Banshees Over Canada is a 19-minute 1943 Canadian documentary film, made by the National Film Board of Canada (NFB). The film was produced by Sydney Newman and directed by James Beveridge. The film's Canadian French title was Vautours au-dessus du Canada. It was produced as part of the wartime Canada Carries On series.

== Synopsis ==
British preparations for a German bombing raid are examined, as well as the resultant destruction caused by the raid and the defences mounted by Britain's Royal Air Force. Canadian preparations for air defence, should the country be attacked during the Second World War, are also highlighted, with several scenes depicting preparations in Vancouver, BC.

== Production ==
Typical of the NFB's Canada Carries On series of documentary short films, Banshees Over Canada relied heavily on newsreel footage. The British sequences were from the British Ministry of Information. The later sequences of air-raid and civil defence preparations in Canada were primarily filmed in Vancouver and elsewhere in British Columbia. Vancouver Motion Pictures (VMP) was responsible for the BC footage, which was directed by Ed Taylor and photographed by Wally Hamilton. VMP produced (or photographed scenes for) several NFB titles during the 1940s. The deep baritone voice of stage actor Lorne Greene was featured in the narration of Banshees Over Canada.

== Reception ==
As part of the Canada Carries On series, Banshees Over Canada was produced in 35mm for the theatrical market. Each film was shown over a six-month period as part of the shorts or newsreel segments in approximately 800 theatres across Canada. The NFB had an arrangement with Famous Players theatres to ensure that Canadians from coast-to-coast could see them, with further distribution by Columbia Pictures.

After the six-month theatrical tour ended, individual films were made available on 16 mm to schools, libraries, churches and factories, extending the life of these films by another year or two. They were also made available to film libraries operated by university and provincial authorities. A total of 199 films were produced before the series was canceled in 1959.
