= Train Busters =

- Title card
- Directed by: Sydney Newman
- Produced by: Raymond Spottiswoode
- Cinematography: RCAF Overseas Film Unit
- Music by: Lucio Agostini
- Production company: National Film Board of Canada
- Distributed by: Columbia Pictures of Canada
- Release date: May 25, 1943
- Running time: 13 minutes
- Country: Canada
- Language: English

Train Busters (aka R.C.A.F. Train-Busters; its alternate French language version was known as La guerre des airs (Note: The French title more accurately describes the subject matter.)) is a 13-minute 1943 Canadian documentary film, directed by Sydney Newman. The film was made by the Royal Canadian Air Force (RCAF) Overseas Film Unit and the National Film Board of Canada (NFB) as part of the NFB's Canada Carries On series. Train Busters depicts the Allied night-bombing campaign over German-occupied Europe that was complemented by close air support missions flown by the RCAF targeting enemy trains.

== Synopsis ==
In 1943, the RCAF strength and equipment consists of 32 overseas squadrons based in England. Two fundamental missions were essential to the Allied air strategy: night bombing and interdiction. While bombers struck at the heart of occupied Europe, the German war machine reacted by sending out supplies to their far-flung European bases by rail. The RCAF disrupted the "nerve centres" by attacking the rail system. These specialized ground attack fighters were extremely successful, with fighter-bombers destroying munition trains.

== Production ==
A Canadian-based Hawker Hurricane Mk XII is filmed; note the lack of a spinner that characterized the Hurricane fighters in Canada, while the mix of sequences purports to show a European sortie.

Typical of the NFB's wartime series of documentary short films, Train Busters relied heavily on military assistance in obtaining stock footage. The film incorporated footage shot over a period of time from 1939–1943. While the aerial sequences were limited to available footage, some of the aerial scenes were shot in Canada and carefully edited with other footage obtained from the British Ministry of Information as well as other sources, including pre-war German films.

The RCAF aircraft in Train Busters encompassed most of the types used in Bomber and Fighter Commands, by the RCAF in 1943, including:

- de Havilland Mosquito medium bomber/fighter-bomber
- Handley Page Halifax heavy bomber
- Hawker Hurricane fighter/fighter-bomber
- North American Mustang I reconnaissance/fighter-bomber
- Short Stirling heavy bomber
- Supermarine Spitfire fighter, fighter-bomber
- Vickers Wellington medium bomber

== Reception ==
As part of the NFB's newsreel programs, Train Busters was produced for both the military and the theatrical market. As R.C.A.F. Train-Busters, the film was issued to military bases on May 25, 1943, as Newsreel of the Week: Issue No. 8, part of the Canadian Army newsreel series.

Each film in NFB's Canada Carries On series was shown over a six-month period as part of the shorts or newsreel segments in approximately 800 theatres across Canada. The NFB had an arrangement with Famous Players theatres to ensure that Canadians from coast to coast could see them, with further distribution by Columbia Pictures.

After the six-month theatrical tour ended, individual films were made available on 16 mm to schools, libraries, churches and factories, extending the life of these films by another year or two. They were also made available to film libraries operated by university and provincial authorities. Although available from the National Film Board both online as well as on a DVD, Train Busters is now largely forgotten.

Historian Malek Khouri analyzed the role of the NFB wartime documentaries, with Train Busters characterized as an example of a propaganda film. "During the early years of the NFB, its creative output was largely informed by the turbulent political and social climate the world was facing. World War II, Communism, unemployment, the role of labour unions, and working conditions were all subjects featured by the NFB during the period from 1939 to 1946". In Filming Politics, Khouri described a "new-found fascination" with technological advances in winning the war, especially through the use of air power.
