= Gateway to Asia =

- Screenshot of the opening title
- Directed by: Tom Daly
- Produced by: Tom Daly
- Narrated by: Lorne Greene
- Edited by: Tom Daly
- Production company: National Film Board of Canada
- Distributed by: Columbia Pictures of Canada
- Release date: 1945
- Running time: 10 minutes
- Country: Canada
- Language: English

Gateway to Asia is a 10-minute 1945 Canadian documentary film, directed and produced by Tom Daly for the National Film Board of Canada (NFB) as part of the wartime Canada Carries On series. The film documents the importance of British Columbia during the Second World War as a "gateway" to Asia and the Pacific. The French version of Gateway to Asia is Au seuil du Pacifique.

== Synopsis ==
Before the war, British Columbia was treated as a unique "back door" to the Pacific and considered by many as one of Canada's playgrounds. Visitors were often enchanted by the scenery but were not aware of the rich bounty of the region including forests, mountains and the sea. The lumber and pulp and paper industries represent the greatest livelihood for thousands of B.C. citizens. The fast-growing mining industry with its roots back to Gold Rush days and the extensive commercial fisheries which provide more than 1/2 the fish production in Canada, are also important.

In wartime, the population of British Columbia has utilized its vast natural resources and industrial strength to become a critical factor in Canada's war effort. From its shipyards comes nearly 3/4s of all the Canadian ships constructed in the Second World War. Its residents have made a substantial contribution to the home front workforce. Although there is a diverse population in Canada's most westerly province, 70% of its people have British origins. Other ethnic group make up the province's population include Japanese- and Chinese-Canadians as well as a significant number of Sikhs.

With the outbreak of a Pacific War, however, major ramifications were caused in B.C.'s population, especially among the large numbers of Japanese-Canadians. Overnight, the 22,000 citizens of Japanese background were removed from the Pacific coast and their property seized.

British Columbia provides a vital link between the rest of Canada and its neighbours in the Far East, Asia and Russia. The use of the Northwest Staging Route with airstrips, airports and radio ranging stations built in Alberta, the Yukon and British Columbia was a "skyway" to Asia. The aircraft that flew this route not only supplied the ongoing construction of the Alaska Highway but also served to ferry American lend-lease aircraft for the Soviet Union Air Forces from the United States to Alaska, and then across the Bering Strait to Siberia.

At the threshold of a new age, with the advent of high-speed air travel, Canada's Pacific gateway to Asia, will also become a new international trade route to connect to over 1/2 of the people of the world.

== Cast ==
- General A.G.L. McNaughton as Himself (archival footage)

== Historical context ==
The widespread expulsion of Japanese-Canadians from Pacific coast "restricted" areas, as depicted in Gateway to Asia is reflective of official government policy during the Second World War. While mention is made that property was abandoned, the large fishing fleets, farms and businesses owned by Japanese-Canadians, through the War Measures Act (1942), were actually sold with their previous owners forced to give up their rights for recourse. (Note: Seized property was impounded by the Alien Property Custodian.) The detention camps may not have been prisons, but the film uses them as a backdrop, along with ominous music representing Japan, to justify the expulsion with the disclaimer that a final determination of permanent resettlement has not yet been made. By 1945, the Parliament of Canada had enacted legislation to codify the impounding of property and removal of both Nisei and foreign-born Canadians of Japanese origin.

== Production ==
Typical of the NFB's Second World War documentary short films in the Canada Carries On series, Gateway to Asia was created as a morale boosting propaganda film. The film used a compilation documentary format that relied heavily on newsreel footage edited to provide a cogent message. (Note: Enemy footage was provided care of the Alien Property Custodian.)

The deep baritone voice of stage actor Lorne Greene was featured in the narration of Gateway to Asia. Greene was known for his work on radio broadcasts as a news announcer at CBC, as well as narrating many of the Canada Carries On series. His sonorous recitation led to his nickname, "The Voice of Canada", and to some observers, the "Voice-of-God". When reading grim battle statistics or narrating a particularly serious topic, he was known as "The Voice of Doom".

== Reception ==
Gateway to Asia was produced in 35 mm for the theatrical market. Each film was shown over a six-month period as part of the shorts or newsreel segments in approximately 800 theatres across Canada. The NFB had an arrangement with Famous Players theatres to ensure that Canadians from coast-to-coast could see them, with further distribution by Columbia Pictures.

After the six-month theatrical tour ended, individual films were made available on 16 mm to schools, libraries, churches and factories, extending the life of these films for another year or two. They were also made available to film libraries operated by university and provincial authorities.

== See also ==
- Warclouds in the Pacific (1941)
- Look to the North (1944)
