= Guards of the North =

1941 Canadian short film

- Opening title
- Directed by: Raymond Spottiswoode
- Written by: Graham McInnes
- Narrated by: Lorne Greene
- Cinematography: Tennyson D'Eyncourt
- Edited by: Raymond Spottiswoode; Alex Myers
- Music by: Lucio Agostini
- Production company: National Film Board of Canada
- Distributed by: Columbia Pictures of Canada
- Release date: 1941
- Running time: 10 minutes
- Country: Canada
- Language: English

Guards of the North is a 10-minute 1941 Canadian documentary film, made by the National Film Board of Canada (NFB) as part of the wartime Canada Carries On series. The film, directed by Raymond Spottiswoode, documented the defences of Iceland during the Second World War. The film's French version title is Avant-garde du Nord.

== Synopsis ==
After the fall of Denmark and Norway in 1940, Nazi Germany looked at Iceland as its next conquest. The island nation could control the North Atlantic sea lanes and was seen as a staging point to also occupy nearby Greenland. In setting up bases at Iceland and Greenland, Luftwaffe bombers could threaten Canada with Newfoundland only three hours flight time away, Halifax, five hours away and even the industrial heartland of Canada only seven hours from Greenland.

To fortify the island defences, British and Canadian troops secured Iceland in May 1940. Convoys rapidly unloaded troops and supplies to support a Canadian mission. The troops brought all the matériel to become completely independent, including trucks, coal, lumber and massive coastal guns to be erected at the island's coastline to guard the approaches to Iceland. After setting up tents, the Canadian troops built more permanent Nissen huts, and established bases on the island.

With the Royal Navy and Fleet Air Arm providing naval resources and Canadian troops stationed at the strategic outpost, Iceland no longer faced the risk of falling into Nazi Germany's hands, preempting substantial danger to the convoys of the North Atlantic.

== Production ==
Typical of the NFB's Second World War documentary short films in the Canada Carries On series, Guards of the North, in association with Audio Pictures, Toronto, was made in cooperation with the Director of Public Information, Herbert Lash. The film was created as a morale boosting propaganda film. Guards of the North was a compilation documentary that relied heavily on newsreel material including "enemy" footage, in order to provide the background to the dialogue. (Note: Enemy footage was provided care of the Alien Property Custodian.) On location photography came from the team of cinematographer Tennyson D'Eyncourt and sound recording by Ross Robinson.

The deep baritone voice of stage actor Lorne Greene was featured in the narration of Guards of the North. Greene was known for his work on both radio broadcasts as a news announcer at CBC as well as narrating many of the Canada Carries On series. His sonorous recitation led to his nickname, "The Voice of Canada", and to some observers, the "voice-of-God". When reading grim battle statistics or narrating a particularly serious topic, he was known as "The Voice of Doom".

== Reception ==
Guards of the North was produced in 35 mm for the theatrical market. Each film was shown over a six-month period as part of the shorts or newsreel segments in approximately 800 theatres across Canada. The NFB had an arrangement with Famous Players theatres to ensure that Canadians from coast-to-coast could see them, with further distribution by Columbia Pictures.

After the six-month theatrical tour ended, individual films were made available on 16 mm to schools, libraries, churches and factories, extending the life of these films for another year or two. They were also made available to film libraries operated by university and provincial authorities. A total of 199 films were produced before the series was canceled in 1959.

== See also ==
- Invasion of Iceland in the Second World War
