= Portrait of Canada =

- Opening title
- Directed by: Hector Lemieux
- Written by: Joan Hind-Smith
- Produced by: Tim Wilson; Nicholas Balla (Executive producer)
- Cinematography: Hector Lemieux
- Edited by: George Kaczender; George Croll (Re-recording)
- Music by: Norman Bigras
- Production company: National Film Board of Canada
- Distributed by: Canadian Broadcasting Corporation (CBC Television)
- Release date: 1959
- Running time: 10 minutes
- Country: Canada
- Language: English

Portrait of Canada is a 10-minute 1959 Canadian documentary film, made by the National Film Board of Canada (NFB) as part of the postwar Canada Carries On series. The film, directed by Guy Glover, described the creation of the All Canadian Atlas. The film's French version title is L'Atlas du Canada.

== Synopsis ==
Canadian mapmakers 400 years ago relied on hand-drawn maps derived from personal accounts by explorers, fur traders and settlers. These maps were limited to coastlines and partial interior views. Explorers like Samuel de Champlain, Jacques Cartier and David Thompson made their own maps. Later explorers and prospectors were often the first to go into uncharted regions, and their information on the land was invaluable in drawing up the maps of the time.

In 1959, the new All Canadian Atlas is a product of the joint efforts of geologists, meteorologists, prospectors, agronomists, draughtspersons, naturalists and especially, the Royal Canadian Air Force. Aerial photography was essential in mapping the vast north of Canada. In 1948, No. 413 RCAF Squadron/No. 13 (Photographic) Squadron flying specially converted Avro Lancaster 10P aircraft undertook the task of mapping Canada's Arctic. Three large islands were discovered and one island near Baffin Island was named "Air Force" in their honour.

With all the accumulated data from photographs, the mapmakers of the All Canadian Atlas consulted with interested parties from government, industry and academia to ensure that all relevant information is included. Each of the 500 maps contains a wealth of information, depicting Canada in a hundred different ways from political boundaries, settlement, urban development, habitats, mineral and agricultural areas, temperatures and climates, transportation and industry to provide an accurate portrait of Canada in the late 1950s.

== Production ==
Portrait of Canada was a short informational documentary in the NFB's films Canada Carries On series (first created as a wartime series). The film was a compilation documentary that combined newsreel material with animated sequences and original footage, including aerial footage from the Royal Canadian Air Force.

== Reception ==
Portrait of Canada was produced for television broadcast on CBC Television. Individual films were distributed worldwide by the NFB and were also made available to film libraries operated by university and provincial authorities. A total of 199 films in the Canada Carries On series were produced before the series was canceled in 1959.

== See also ==
- Atlas of Canada
