= Pincer on Axis Europe =

- Title Frame
- Narrated by: Lorne Greene
- Music by: Lucio Agostini
- Production company: National Film Board of Canada
- Distributed by: National Film Board of Canada; Columbia Pictures of Canada
- Release date: February 6, 1943
- Running time: 20 minutes
- Country: Canada
- Language: English

Pincer on Axis Europe is a 20-minute 1943 Canadian documentary film, made by the National Film Board of Canada as part of the wartime Canada Carries On series. The film describes the Allied invasion of North Africa in 1942 during the Second World War.

== Synopsis ==
In 1942, the Axis powers appear to be in ascendance in both eastern Europe and Africa. The Wehrmacht attacks in Operation Barbarossa have been making great advances through the Soviet Union. In North Africa, the Afrika Korps, led by Generalleutnant Erwin Rommel have pushed back the Allied forces and begun the Siege of Tobruk, a major garrison. With the success of these two campaigns, Nazi Germany was poised to push through the Middle East to India, joining Japanese forces striking from China and Burma.

The Soviet Union pressed the United States and United Kingdom to start operations in Europe and open a second front to reduce the pressure of Nazi forces on the Soviet troops. President Franklin D. Roosevelt supported an African operation. Operation Torch, an attack on French North Africa was proposed, with the objective of driving the Axis powers from North Africa. With weapons and equipment including Canadian-made trucks, supplied from Allied arsenals, a massive invasion force was built up.

In the first of a two-pronged campaign, General Bernard Montgomery, the commander of the British 8th Army during the Battles of El Alamein, repulsed Rommel's attacks and forced an Axis retreat. In applying further pressure on the Nazi forces, a task force composed of American units, with Major General George S. Patton in command. set out for Casablanca, the principal Vichy French Atlantic naval base after German occupation of the European coast.

In November 1942, Allied forces led by Rear Admiral Henry K. Hewitt commenced the Naval Battle of Casablanca. The rapid surrender of the French forces led to the capture of high-ranking German officials who were sent into internment. With the great British gains in the desert war and the success of the invasion and capitulation of the Vichy French forces at the rear lines, the Afrika Korps was held in a "pincer vice" with no options other than surrender or abandoning North Africa.

In 1943, Allied forces are being assembled for an assault on Italy, with another "pincer" campaign aimed at the heart of Axis-held Europe.

== Cast ==
- General Dwight D. Eisenhower as himself (archival footage)
- GeneralGeorge Marshall as herself (archival footage)
- GeneralOmar Bradley as himself (archival footage)
- General Mark W. Clark as himself (archival footage)
- General Bernard Montgomery as himself (archival footage)
- Adolf Hitler as himself (archival footage)
- Erwin Rommel as himself (archival footage)
- Philippe Pétain as himself (archival footage)
- French General Henri Giraud as himself (archival footage)
- Franklin D. Roosevelt as himself (archival footage)
- Winston Churchill as himself (archival footage)

== Production ==
Pincer on Axis Europe was part of the wartime Canada Carries On propaganda short film series, produced with financial backing from the Wartime Information Board for the Director of Public Information, Herbert Lash.

Typical of the NFB's series of morale-boosting films, Pincer on Axis Europe used the format of a compilation documentary, relying heavily on newsreel material, including "enemy" footage, in order to provide the background to the dialogue. (Note: Enemy footage was provided care of the Alien Property Custodian.).

As he had in the narration of many of the Canada Carries On series, Lorne Greene was the uncredited narrator on Pincer on Axis Europe. Greene was not only a stage actor, but was also featured on radio broadcasts as a news announcer at CBC as well as his work at the NFB. Known as "The Voice of Canada", and to some observers, the "Voice-of-God" or even "The Voice of Doom", listeners often associated his narration to serious topics.

== Reception ==
An intertitle identified the importance of Pincer on Axis Europe, announcing in a title card that Canadian troops were involved in the invasion of North Africa. (Note: Despite the official declaration of the role of Canadians in Operation Torch, their involvement revolved around 17 Royal Canadian Navy Corvettes and small infantry detachment.) The film, shot in 35 mm, was rushed to completion to capitalize on the Canadian connection and screened across Canada on February 6, 1943. Pincer on Axis Europe appeared on the theatrical market as a newsreel accompanying feature films. Each film in both the NFB The World in Action and Canada Carries On series was shown over a six-month period as part of the shorts or newsreel segments in approximately 800 theatres across Canada.

The NFB had an arrangement with Famous Players theatres to ensure that Canadians from coast-to-coast could see them, with further distribution by Columbia Pictures. After the six-month theatrical tour ended, individual films were made available on 16 mm to schools, libraries, churches and factories, extending the life of these films for another year or two. They were also made available to film libraries operated by university and provincial authorities.

== See also ==
- The Gates of Italy (1943)
