= Wounded in Action (film) =

- Theatrical poster by Harry Mayerovitch, c. 1944
- Narrated by: Lorne Greene
- Production company: National Film Board of Canada
- Distributed by: Columbia Pictures of Canada
- Release date: 1944
- Running time: 22 minutes
- Country: Canada
- Language: English

Wounded in Action is a 22-minute Canadian documentary film made in 1944. It was made by the National Film Board of Canada (NFB) as part of the wartime Canada Carries On series. The film documents the work carried out by medical services in saving the lives of those who are wounded in action during the Second World War. The French version title of Wounded in Action is Blessé au combat.

== Synopsis ==
Every day during the Second World War, fighting men are "wounded in action", the terse military declaration in telegrams sent back to family and loved ones. Compared to similar wounds suffered in the First World War, 97% of the wounded are brought back to health.

The first line of medical care takes place directly at the frontlines where medical services operate advance stations. All nations provide immediate emergency medical care. In the Soviet Union, nurses are even parachuted down to the frontlines wherever the need is greatest.

In other theaters of war, stretcher bearers use whatever is there from ambulances, toboggans, and in the Pacific, even donkeys or mules are employed to carry the wounded to treatment centers. More than anything else, the use of aircraft as an ambulance service has made the difference for many of the wounded at the battlefields. (Note: In the North African campaign, over 50,00 wounded Allied soldiers were airlifted from the battlefields.) Serious cases are also sent home by ship so that skilled medical staff can be enlisted in recovery, convalescence and rest.

The object is to try to rapidly intervene in the "golden hours", the first six hours after a wound is suffered. Care for a wounded man follows a basic pattern, first administer first aid on the spot, then quickly transfer the wounded to first aid posts close to the frontlines, sometimes working right under the guns of the enemy, or other dressing stations, field hospitals and surgical units behind the rear lines.

The wounded are identified by the Royal Canadian Army Medical Corps by the serious nature of the wounds. The Canadian Army field dressing stations, working within 4,000 yards of the frontlines, treats group one wounds because the patients cannot be moved. Group two wounds require surgical operations within a few hours while group three wounds which make up 3/4 of the cases, have the patients evacuated back to the rear for treatment at hospitals.

Doctors and nurses at the front have been receiving support from research scientists, who are using modern science to combat the effects of high altitude flying, heal burns and even reconstruct shattered limbs and faces. New treatments stressing recovery in both body and mind are also showing impressive results.

== Production ==
Typical of the NFB's Second World War documentary short films in the Canada Carries On series, Wounded in Action was created as a morale boosting propaganda film. The film was a compilation documentary that relied heavily on combat footage shot by the Canadian Armed Forces, and the film units of the United States Army Signal Corps, United States Army Air Forces and the British Army, edited to provide a coherent message.

The voice of stage actor Lorne Greene was featured as the narration of Wounded in Action. Greene was known for his work on radio broadcasts as a news announcer at CBC, as well as narrating many of the Canada Carries On series. His sonorous recitation led to his nickname, "The Voice of Canada", and to some observers, the "voice-of-God". When reading grim battle statistics or narrating a particularly serious topic, he was known as "The Voice of Doom".

== Reception ==
Wounded in Action was produced in 35 mm for the theatrical market. Each film was shown over a six-month period as part of the shorts or newsreel segments in approximately 800 theaters across Canada. The NFB had an arrangement with Famous Players theatres to ensure that Canadians from coast-to-coast could see them, with further distribution by Columbia Pictures.

After the six-month theatrical tour ended, individual films were made available on 16 mm to schools, libraries, churches and factories, extending the life of these films for another year or two. They were also made available to film libraries operated by university and provincial authorities. A total of 199 films were produced before the series was canceled in 1959.
