= Norway in Revolt =

1941 short film

- Production company: Time Inc.
- Distributed by: RKO Radio Pictures
- Release date: September 1941
- Running time: 19 minutes
- Country: United States
- Language: English

Norway in Revolt is a 1941 American short documentary film that was an episode in the newsreel series The March of Time. The 19-minute documentary was nominated for an Academy Award for Best Documentary Short.

== See also ==
- Fighting Norway, a 1943 Canadian newsreel short
