= Up from the Ranks =

- Opening title
- Directed by: Julian Roffman
- Produced by: Raymond Spottiswoode
- Starring: Pete Coventry; Roily Ashman; Bill Connelly; John Taylor; Paul Richard; Marc Talbot; Harry Mar; Bill Tichnor; Roger Monast
- Production company: National Film Board of Canada
- Distributed by: Columbia Pictures of Canada
- Release date: September 3, 1943
- Running time: 19 minutes
- Country: Canada
- Language: English

Up from the Ranks is a 19-minute 1943 Canadian docudrama film, made by the National Film Board of Canada (NFB) as part of the wartime Canada Carries On series. The film, directed by Julian Roffman and produced by Raymond Spottiswoode, described the training of Canadian Army officers to take on command responsibilities during the Second World War.

== Synopsis ==
In 1943, a group of Canadian Army officer recruits begin their 90-day training regimen at the Canadian Officers' Training Centre (OTC) at Brockville, Ontario. The object is to turn out officers who will take charge of a platoon of soldiers. The way officers once received their commission through family connections or other status, is no longer being followed as the recruits are not college graduates, but ordinary soldiers who have proven themselves in the enlisted ranks, and are already serving in overseas units.

Their first day involves receiving all the manuals, weapons and equipment and finding a bed in the barracks, shared by three or four men. As the recruits settle in, they share their experiences on course, and counsel each other as to what is required. Lectures conducted by experienced leaders stress that an officer must learn not only the basics but has to communicate with his men. Understanding what leadership means is more than just "book learning" but also being able to relate to those who under his command with a sense of humility and honesty, and even, humour.

The gruelling training was to prepare officer candidates to face "the toughest enemy on earth.” In describing the training, one candidate relates, "I think that any officer who can't run faster and farther and fight better than any man that he's supposed to be leading isn't worthy of leading those men across the road." All officer candidates learn to use weapons, drive trucks and motorcycles across rough terrain and tackle obstacle courses during field exercises. Hand-to-hand combat is also taught so that an enemy can be subdued in a lethal manner.

When the course was completed, at a graduation ceremony, the new officers received their commission from Brigadier Milton Gregg VC, who had been instrumental in setting up the Officers' Training Centre at Brockville.

== Cast ==
- Lieut. Pete Coventry
- Lieut. Roily Ashman
- Lieut. Bill Connelly
- Lieut. Paul Richard
- Lieut. Marc Talbot
- Lieut. John Taylor
- Lieut. Harry Mar
- Lieut. Bill Tichnor
- Lieut. Smith
- Lieut. Roger Monast
- Brigadier Milton Gregg

== Production ==
Typical of the NFB's Second World War documentary short films in the Canada Carries On series, Up from the Ranks was made in cooperation with the Director of Public Information, Herbert Lash. The film was created as a morale boosting propaganda film with another purpose, to show how officer training produced future leaders in the Canadian Army.

Up from the Ranks, although using some compilation documentary techniques incorporating newsreel material in the initial scenes, was a docudrama that relied heavily on original footage shot at a military base in Canada, using officers-in-training who were the "actors". Director Julian Roffman was able to cast a number of trainees who would provide a realistic, if "wooden", performance as officers. The "stars" of Up from the Ranks were identified in a contemporary review of the film, that appeared in the September 3, 1943 issue of the Winnipeg Tribune: "Stars of 'Up From the Ranks' are mostly youthful commissioned officers who came to Canada as sergeants. There Is Lieut. Roily Ashman, a woodmlll worker near Ottawa; Lieut. Bill Connelly, who did a little radio singing in Ottawa and worked as a salesman; Lieut. John Taylor was a bank clerk; Lieut. Smith, a mechanic; Lieut. Paul Richard, a radio station manager in Quebec; Lieut. Marc Talbot was a foreman of a paper mill; Lieut. Harry Mar - sales, café proprietor from the United States, and Lieut. Bill Tichnor was a Ford mechanic. Roger Monast, the French lad in the film, was a stunt flier in 'Captains of the Clouds'. He was washed out of the R.C.A.F. after a crash." (Note: Roffman would go on to cast Pete Coventry as the lead actor in two other NFB short films, Battle Is Our Business (1943) and 13 Platoon (1943).)

== Reception ==
Up from the Ranks was produced in 35 mm for the theatrical market, bit was also destined for showings to a military audience. Each film was shown over a six-month period as part of the shorts or newsreel segments in approximately 800 theatres across Canada. The NFB had an arrangement with Famous Players theatres to ensure that Canadians from coast-to-coast could see them, with further distribution by Columbia Pictures.

After the six-month theatrical tour ended, individual films were made available on 16 mm to schools, libraries, churches and factories, extending the life of these films by another year or two. They were also made available to film libraries operated by university and provincial authorities. A total of 199 films were produced before the series was canceled in 1959.

== See also ==
- Letter from Aldershot (1940), a NFB documentary on soldiers First Division of the Canadian Active Service Force, stationed at Aldershot Garrison, England in the Second World War.
- Letter from Camp Borden (1941), a NFB documentary on the soldiers training at the Canadian Army's Camp Borden during wartime.
