= Thunder in the East (1950 film) =

- Title frame
- Directed by: Douglas Tunstell
- Written by: Daryl Duke
- Produced by: Sydney Newman
- Narrated by: John Scott
- Edited by: Douglas Tunstell
- Music by: Eldon Rathburn
- Production company: National Film Board of Canada
- Distributed by: National Film Board of Canada
- Release date: 1950; (broadcast date)
- Running time: 11 minutes
- Country: Canada
- Language: English

Thunder in the East is a 1950 11-minute Canadian short documentary film directed by Douglas Tunstell and produced by Sydney Newman for the National Film Board of Canada (NFB) as part of the postwar Canada Carries On series. Thunder in the East recounts the issues which precipitated the Korean War, and of the needs of the impoverished Asian countries struggling to feed their populaces. The film's French version title is Orage sur l'Asie.

== Synopsis ==
At the end of the Second World War, Asia was in a critical political juncture as former colonial powers vied for supremacy with new forces such as emerging democracies and the encroachment of Communist occupations. As leaders such as Mahatma Gandhi and Jawaharlal Nehru created a new peaceful and democratic India, elsewhere, other nations struggled with not only creating political and economic stability but also on how to provide the staples of life for millions living in impoverished conditions that existed in postwar Asia.

The All-Asia Conference of 1947 for the first time had representatives from 2/3 of the world's population coming together to serve the common good. The signs of friendship coming from western countries included shipments of food, fertilizers, tractors, school books, medical equipment and other aid. Leaders such as Canada's diplomat at the conference, Lester B. Pearson recognized the challenges inherent in Asia and the commitment that the West must make to keep the region peaceful.

On the Korean Peninsula "... a line was being drawn across the country". On either side of the border marked by the 38th parallel, United States and Russian forces held occupied territory previously controlled by the Japanese. The demarcation line separated families, as free movement was not allowed while hydro-electric power from the north was also curtailed.

In Korea, two different types of governments emerged on each side of the border. Elections in 1947 monitored by the United Nations were not permitted in the Communist-held north that ultimately became Democratic People's Republic of Korea. South Korea held UN-sponsored elections and created the First Republic of South Korea. In 1950, tensions between the two rival states intensified, with North Korea's incursions into South Korea leading to an open conflict.

A regional conflict in Korea threatened to engulf the world in a major Cold War confrontation. Through the United Nations, the world reacted, with Canada lining up with the United States and other western nations to confront North Korea's aggression. (Note: Combat footage from the Korean War was featured in the film.)

== Cast ==
- Mahatma Gandhi as himself (archival footage)
- Jawaharlal Nehru as himself (archival footage)
- Ho Chi Minh as himself (archival footage)
- Lester B. Pearson as himself (archival footage)
- Sukarno as himself (archival footage)
- Mao as himself (archival footage)

== Production ==
Thunder in the East was part of the NFB's Canada Carries On series of documentary short films for theatrical showings. Most postwar programs dealt with contemporary issues in Canada, although international events involving Canadians were also produced. The film was a compilation documentary edited to provide a coherent story, that relied heavily on newsreel material in order to provide the background to the dialogue. Sound editing in the studio was undertaken by Roger Beaudry and Peter Jones, under supervision by director Douglas Tunstell. Noted composer Eldon Rathburn composed the film score.

== Reception ==
Thunder in the East was primarily a theatrical production that had characteristics of a newsreel due to its release at the start of the Korean War, A number of other NFB documentaries chronicled other aspects of the Korean War including Korea, After the War (1954) as part of the On the Spot series. After its theatrical run, Thunder in the East was made available on 16 mm to schools, libraries and other interested parties. The film was also made available to film libraries operated by university and provincial authorities.

== See also ==
- List of artistic depictions of Mahatma Gandhi
