= Flight 6 (film) =

- Screenshot: Title frame
- Directed by: Sydney Newman
- Produced by: Guy Glover
- Narrated by: Lorne Greene
- Cinematography: Sydney Newman
- Production company: National Film Board of Canada
- Distributed by: Columbia Pictures of Canada
- Release date: 1944
- Running time: 10 minutes
- Country: Canada
- Language: English

Flight 6 is a 1944 Canadian documentary film produced by the National Film Board of Canada and directed and primarily photographed by Sydney Newman. The film is part of the Canada Carries On series, which ran from 1940 to 1959. Newman was also the executive producer for the series. Many of the documentaries were created as morale boosting propaganda films during the Second World War.

== Synopsis ==
In 1944, Flight 6, a Trans-Canada Air Lines Lockheed Model 14 Super Electra airliner, while on its landing approach, nearly crashed at Dorval Airport in Montreal, Quebec, when an Avro Anson training aircraft wandered into its path. Flight 6 crossed Canada from Montreal to Vancouver and back, carrying a load of blue and yellow air mail bags.

One of the vital pieces of mail, which started out at the Burrard Shipyard in Vancouver, is a container carrying the microfilmed blueprints of an elevator that would be incorporated in a naval vessel. Destined for approval at the Admiralty in England, it was one of countless items shipped three times a week across to war-torn London, Moscow, Lisbon, Paris and Chongqing. Just as important was a letter signifying acceptance of a wedding proposal that was to end up with a soldier on patrol in Germany with The Calgary Highlanders.

After making their way, sometimes as far as 5,000 miles (8,000 km), the hundreds of individual air mail were transferred to an Avro Lancastrian and flown on a 12-hour flight to Prestwick, Scotland. The letters and parcels eventually made their way to recipients overseas, all for the cost of a nine- or 10-cent stamp.

== Production ==
Along with Salute to Victory, Atlantic Patrol, Battle of Europe and Battle for Oil, Flight 6 made during the Second World War "... might be called soft-sell propaganda." Typical of the NFB's Canada Carries On series of documentary short films, Flight 6 told a simple but direct story about Canada's role in wartime, especially focusing on the advances made in aviation, one of the main themes of the series. The narrator was Lorne Greene, known for his work on both radio broadcasts as a news announcer at CBC, as well as narrating many films of the Canada Carries On series. His sonorous recitation led to his nickname, "the Voice of Canada", and when reading grim battle statistics, "the Voice of Doom".

== Reception ==
As part of the Canada Carries On series, Flight 6 was produced in 35 mm for the theatrical market. Each film was shown over a six-month period as part of the shorts or newsreel segments in approximately 800 theatres across Canada. The NFB had an arrangement with Famous Players theatres to ensure that Canadians from coast to coast could see them, with further distribution by Columbia Pictures.

After the six-month theatrical tour ended, individual films were made available on 16 mm to schools, libraries, churches and factories, extending the life of these films for another year or two. They were also made available to film libraries operated by university and provincial authorities.
