= Fighting Norway =

- Screenshot: Title frame
- Directed by: Sydney Newman
- Narrated by: Lorne Greene
- Distributed by: National Film Board of Canada; Columbia Pictures
- Release date: 1943
- Running time: 10 minutes
- Country: Canada
- Language: English

Fighting Norway is a 10-minute 1943 Canadian documentary, part of the wartime Canada Carries On series of short films produced by the National Film Board of Canada. The film was directed by Sydney Newman, one of a number of shorts that were intended for theatrical release.

== Synopsis ==
The role of the free forces of occupied Norway during the Second World War is documented, especially the role of the Norwegian underground.

Canada offered haven to Norwegian troops at a "Little Norway" Norwegian Army Air Service/Royal Norwegian Air Force training camp in Ontario. The training of Norwegian air crew in Canada, and the relationships formed between servicemen of the two nations is emphasized.

== Cast ==
- Haakon VII as himself (archive footage)
- Vidkun Quisling as himself (archive footage)

== Production ==
Fighting Norway was produced in 1943, with financial backing from the Wartime Information Board. The documentary was created as a propaganda film during the Second World War, emphasizing the cooperation and collaboration of two allied countries.

The narrator was Lorne Greene, known for his work on both radio broadcasts as a news announcer at CBC as well as narrating many of the Canada Carries On series. His sonorous recitation led to his nickname, "The Voice of Canada", and to some observers, the "voice-of-God". When reading grim battle statistics or, as in Fighting Norway, narrating a particularly serious topic, he was "the Voice of Doom". Some of the stock footage used had previously been used in the British documentary All for Norway (1942).

== Reception ==
As part of the Canada Carries On series, Fighting Norway was produced in 35 mm for the theatrical market. Each film was shown over a six-month period as part of the shorts or newsreel segments in approximately 800 theatres across Canada. The NFB had an arrangement with Famous Players theatres to ensure that Canadians from coast to coast could see the documentary series, with further distribution by Columbia Pictures. After the six-month theatrical tour ended, individual films were made available on 16 mm to schools, libraries, churches and factories, extending the life of these films by another year or two. They were also made available to film libraries operated by university and provincial authorities.

== See also ==
- List of Allied propaganda films of World War II
- Norway in Revolt, a 1941 American newsreel short
