= Screaming Jets (film) =

- Opening title
- Directed by: Jack Olsen
- Written by: Stephen Franklin
- Produced by: Sydney Newman
- Narrated by: Jack Scott
- Cinematography: Jean-Marie Couture
- Edited by: Nicholas Balla
- Music by: Robert Fleming
- Production company: National Film Board of Canada
- Distributed by: Columbia Pictures of Canada
- Release date: 1951
- Running time: 11 minutes
- Country: Canada
- Language: English

Screaming Jets is an 11-minute 1951 Canadian documentary film, made by the National Film Board of Canada (NFB) as part of the postwar Canada Carries On series. The film, directed by Jack Olsen and produced by Sydney Newman, depicted the contemporary Canadian and international aircraft in production and on the drawing boards. The film's French version title is Avions à réaction.

== Synopsis ==
In 1951, every major nation is involved in the development of jet aircraft. At international air shows, Great Britain demonstrates the revolutionary de Havilland Comet, the first jet airliner to fly and its nimble de Havilland Vampire jet fighter. The United States is introducing its swept wing Boeing B-47 Stratojet jet bomber into service while the Soviet Union has unveiled a secretive jet design, the Mikoyan-Gurevich MiG-15 fighter interceptor.

Canada has become the latest entrant in the "blowtorch era" sweepstakes with Canadair's Canadair Sabre jet fighter entering large scale production at its Montreal plant, for the Royal Canadian Air Force (RCAF). Based on the North American F-86 Sabre that has already proven itself in the Korean War, the Canadair Sabre will be Canada's front line "dogfighter".

At Avro Canada in Malton, Ontario near Toronto, the company has invested in research and development and embarked on an ambitious program with Canadian-designed and built Orenda jet engine in development, and a jet-powered fighter and airliner going through flight trials. The first to fly is the Avro C.102 Jetliner jet airliner designed for intercontinental routes. The Avro XC-100 twin-engine jet night fighter prototype is rolled out for its successful maiden flight and will soon enter production for the RCAF.

Other experimental designs include the Hiller YH-32 Hornet, ramjet-powered helicopter, the McDonnell XF-85 Goblin parasite fighter, deployed from the bomb bay of the Boeing B-29 Superfortress bomber, Gloster Meteor fighters equipped for aerial refuelling, delta wing Convair XF-92 and the Northrop YB-49 and Armstrong Whitworth A.W.52 flying wing designs, all pointing a way to the future.

== Cast ==
- E.H. Atkins, Avro Canada chief designer
- James C. Floyd, Avro Canada engineer
- John Frost. Avro Canada designer
- Squadron Leader Bill Waterton, Avro Canada test pilot

The film also included footage of Josef Stalin.

== Production ==
Typical of the NFB's postwar documentary short films in the Canada Carries On series, Screaming Jets was a compilation documentary that relied heavily on newsreel material. Additional on location photography at Canadian aircraft factories came from cinematographer Jean-Marie Couture and sound technicians Don Wellington and Clarke Daprato. (Note: Footage from Screaming Jets was re-used in The Golden Age as part of the NFB/CBC Salute to Flight in The World in Action series.)

== Reception ==
Screaming Jets was produced in 35 mm for the theatrical market. The film was received as in the ".. best of 'March of Times' style." The NFB had an arrangement with Famous Players theatres to ensure that Canadians from coast-to-coast could see them, with further distribution by Columbia Pictures.

Individual films were also made available on 16 mm to schools, libraries, churches and factories, extending the life of these films for another year or two. They were also made available to film libraries operated by university and provincial authorities. A total of 199 films were produced before the series was canceled in 1959.
