= Back to Jobs =

- Title frame
- Produced by: Nicholas Balla
- Narrated by: Lorne Greene
- Production company: National Film Board of Canada
- Distributed by: Columbia Pictures of Canada
- Release date: November 1945
- Running time: 9 minutes, 35 seconds
- Country: Canada
- Language: English

Back to Jobs is a nine-minute 1945 Canadian documentary film, made by the National Film Board of Canada (NFB) as part of the postwar Canada Carries On series. The film describes soldiers in the Second World War returning home and back to a civilian life. The French version title of Back to Jobs is Nos soldats reviennent (Our soldiers are coming back.).

== Synopsis ==
In 1945, with the end of the Second World War, many Canadian veterans are welcomed by friends and family. Once back home, the veterans face the inevitable return to civilian life and seeking employment in a new, postwar economy.

Although seven percent of the returning veterans will find work in the resource sector in agriculture, fisheries, forestry and mining, 68% of returning workers will find jobs in industries that were created in urban centres. For 1/3 of the veterans, before they re-enter the workforce, some form of education in an academic or professional field or retraining in a technical- or trades-related field will be required.

Over 25,000 veterans will require medical treatment or therapy to restore them to health before returning to work as "productive citizens". There will be a pressing need to provide specialized care in new programs that could help injured or physically disabled war veterans learn and utilize new work skills. The responsibility to undertake such initiatives lies in cooperation between veterans' communities, government and industry.

The transition for returning veterans between war and peacetime activities will involve the collaboration of industry, government and communities to make postwar Canada work.

== Production ==
Immediately after the war, the Canada Carries On series changed its focus to a nation at peace. Founder John Grierson left the NFB in 1945 and while his message of "national unity through information was still present", a major shift away from wartime "propaganda" films to works of art with the filmmaker's point of view clearly present, took place. (Note: Postwar filmmakers at the NFB demanded that their names be included in credits on their films.)

New postwar NFB short films such as Back to Jobs described Canadian contributions in science, industry, art and culture. Typical of the NFB's documentary style in wartime, the film was a compilation documentary that relied heavily on newsreel footage, edited to provide a coherent message. Along the same themes of returning to a postwar world, the NFB produced Safe Clothing (Habits sans danger) (1946) and Careers and Cradles (Carrières et berceaux) (1947).

The deep baritone voice of stage actor Lorne Greene was featured in the narration of Back to Jobs. Greene was known for his work on radio broadcasts as a news announcer at CBC, as well as narrating many of the Canada Carries On series. His sonorous recitation led to his nickname, "The Voice of Canada", and to some observers, the "voice-of-God". When reading grim battle statistics or narrating a particularly serious topic, he was known as "The Voice of Doom".

== Reception ==
Back to Jobs was produced in 35 mm for the theatrical market. Each film was shown over a six-month period as part of the shorts or newsreel segments in approximately 800 theatres across Canada. The NFB had an arrangement with Famous Players theatres to ensure that Canadians from coast-to-coast could see them, with further distribution by Columbia Pictures. Bookings for the Canada Carries On films continued in Famous Players theatres and other cinemas throughout Canada. Some films were also sold to individual theatres periodically. Columbia Pictures continued to distribute the series, with France Films handling its French counterpart, En Avant Canada, in Quebec and New Brunswick.

After the six-month theatrical tour ended, individual films were made available on 16 mm to schools, libraries, churches and factories, extending the life of these films for another year or two. They were also made available to film libraries operated by university and provincial authorities. A total of 199 films were produced before the series was canceled in 1959.

In his book, Filming Politics: Communism and the Portrayal of the Working Class at the National Film Board of Canada, 1939-46., historian Malek Khouri analyzed the role of the NFB documentaries including Back to Jobs. Khouri noted: "In general, all NFB films dealing with the war veterans' return echoed themes proposed by the Communist left, particularly in the way they stressed the government's responsibility in dealing with the unemployment issue."
