= Road to the Reich =

- Screenshot of the opening title
- Directed by: Tom Daly
- Written by: Tom Daly
- Produced by: Tom Daly
- Narrated by: Lorne Greene
- Edited by: Donald Fraser
- Production company: National Film Board of Canada
- Distributed by: Columbia Pictures of Canada
- Release date: 1945
- Running time: 10 minutes
- Country: Canada
- Language: English

Road to the Reich is a 10-minute 1945 Canadian documentary film, directed and produced by Tom Daly for the National Film Board of Canada as part of the wartime Canada Carries On series. The film documents the Allied forces advances, after the Normandy landings, through France and Belgium during the Second World War. The French version of Road to the Reich is Aux portes du Reich.

== Synopsis ==
In September 1944, Allied troops, including the First Canadian Army, led by General Harry Crerar, begin an advance from Normandy, France where the beachhead was secured. The constant attacks by naval, air and ground forces had devastated the communication systems, rail, road and bridges of the northern coast, and forced the Allies to use a long supply route. A race to create new, shorter supply lines now took place,

One of their first objectives was to occupy the Pas-de-Calais, driving out the Nazi forces. A 24-hour truce allowed civilians to leave the area before intense air bombardment took place. In addition, the large coastal guns from across the English Channel at Dover shelled the Nazi positions. As Allied troops occupied Calais, they discovered the formidable coastal batteries at Cap Gris Nez included some "dummy" guns.

After their victorious campaign, Canadian troops had some time to relax, and in the rear lines, the Canadian Army Film and Photo Unit who had travelled with the troops, set up a film showing of the recent events. The attacks on Fortress Europe were shown to be part of a larger Allied "master plan". More startling was a captured enemy film seized at Saint-Lô, showing Canadian prisoners in Nazi hands.

When the Allied forces continued their push along the Normandy coast, they overran V-1 flying bomb coastal launch sites, continuing to the strategic port of Antwerp, Belgium. A combined Canadian and British air and naval attack backed the amphibious assault. With the liberation of Antwerp, the second-largest port in Europe, Allied shipping began to unload large amounts of war matériel to support the ground campaign, poised to strike at Nazi Germany.

With the steady flow of supplies assured, the "road to the Reich" was opened.

== Cast ==
- General Harry Crerar as himself (archival footage)
- General Bernard Montgomery as himself (archival footage)
- General Dwight D. Eisenhower as himself (archival footage)

== Production ==
Typical of the NFB's Second World War documentary short films in the Canada Carries On series, Road to the Reich was created as a morale boosting propaganda film. The film was the first assigned to Tom Daly who would produce and direct, and later take on a more significant role at the NFB. Using a compilation documentary format that relied heavily on combat footage shot by the Canadian Army Film and Photo Unit, and the British Army film unit, Road to the Reich was edited to provide a powerful message. One of the most striking images was the incorporation of enemy footage that showed captured Canadian troops at Caen who were later brutally killed by the Waffen-SS. (Note: Enemy footage was provided care of the Alien Property Custodian.)

The deep baritone voice of stage actor Lorne Greene was featured in the narration of Road to the Reich. Greene was known for his work on radio broadcasts as a news announcer at CBC, as well as narrating many of the Canada Carries On series. His sonorous recitation led to his nickname, "The Voice of Canada", and to some observers, the "Voice-of-God". When reading grim battle statistics or narrating a particularly serious topic, he was known as "The Voice of Doom".

== Reception ==
Road to the Reich was produced in 35 mm for the theatrical market. Each film was shown over a six-month period as part of the shorts or newsreel segments in approximately 800 theatres across Canada. The NFB had an arrangement with Famous Players theatres to ensure that Canadians from coast-to-coast could see them, with further distribution by Columbia Pictures.

After the six-month theatrical tour ended, individual films were made available on 16 mm to schools, libraries, churches and factories, extending the life of these films for another year or two. They were also made available to film libraries operated by university and provincial authorities.

== See also ==
- Break-through (1944)
