= U.N.R.R.A. presents In the Wake of the Armies ... =

- Title frames
- Directed by: Guy Glover
- Narrated by: Lorne Greene
- Edited by: Guy Glover
- Production company: National Film Board of Canada
- Distributed by: Columbia Pictures of Canada
- Release date: 1944
- Running time: 13 minutes
- Country: Canada
- Language: English

U.N.R.R.A. presents In the Wake of the Armies ... is a 13-minute 1944 Canadian documentary film, made by the National Film Board of Canada (NFB) for the United Nations Relief and Rehabilitation Administration (UNRRA), as part of the wartime Canada Carries On series. The film, directed and edited by Guy Glover, described the work of the UNRRA during the Second World War and Canada's role in the relief agency. The film's French version title is À la suite de nos armées viendra l'entraide.

== Synopsis ==
In 1943, the UNRRA was created by the United Nations to render aid to nationals from the Allied nations. (Note: Franklin D. Roosevelt coined the term, "United Nations" to refer to the Allies.) By 1944, desperate families in war-ravaged Europe, were fleeing their homes and ruined cities, and with their expanded mandate to assist all in distress, only UNRRA could provide relief.

Following intense fighting on the European continent, close to 30 million Europeans were refugees, fleeing before both advancing and retreating armies. With little more than the scant possessions they could carry, the refugees were confronted with a wasteland with food, water, and infrastructure devastated. The lives of thousands in occupied countries have become the responsibility of the Allied governments as they continue their advance into Nazi Germany. With all semblance of order gone, most of the territories in which UNRRA operated was in the midst of political chaos. UNRRA cooperated closely with volunteer charitable organizations, who would work alongside the United Nations agency.

In its first years of operation, UNRRA distributed food, fuel, clothing, shelter, medicine, tools, seeds, fertilizer, farm implements and other basic necessities at a time of severe global shortages and worldwide transportation difficulties. Canada, alone, provided five million tons of wheat, while the United States joined with Canada to provide other food stuffs. The work of UNRRA would continue into the postwar years.

Like the earlier commitments made at the United Nations' conferences on food and agriculture, UNRRA endeavoured to take on the task of relief work throughout Europe to build a stable postwar future, making the world safe and free from fear and want.

== Cast ==
- Franklin Delano Roosevelt
- Herbert H. Lehman, Director-General of UNRRA

== Production ==
Typical of the NFB's Second World War documentary short films in the Canada Carries On series, U.N.R.R.A. presents In the Wake of the Armies ... was made in cooperation with the Director of Public Information, Herbert Lash. The film was created as a morale boosting propaganda film. U.N.R.R.A. presents In the Wake of the Armies ... was a compilation documentary that relied heavily on newsreel material from the film units of the armies, navies and airforces of Great Britain, United States and Canada in order to provide the background to the dialogue.

The deep baritone voice of stage actor Lorne Greene was featured in the narration of U.N.R.R.A. presents In the Wake of the Armies .... Greene, known for his work on both radio broadcasts as a news announcer at CBC as well as narrating many of the Canada Carries On series. His sonorous recitation led to his nickname, "The Voice of Canada", and to some observers, the "voice-of-God". When reading grim battle statistics or narrating a particularly serious topic, he was known as "The Voice of Doom".

== Reception ==
U.N.R.R.A. presents In the Wake of the Armies ... was produced in 35 mm for the theatrical market. Each film was shown over a six-month period as part of the shorts or newsreel segments in approximately 800 theatres across Canada. The NFB had an arrangement with Famous Players theatres to ensure that Canadians from coast-to-coast could see them, with further distribution by Columbia Pictures.

After the six-month theatrical tour ended, individual films were made available on 16 mm to schools, libraries, churches and factories, extending the life of these films for another year or two. They were also made available to film libraries operated by university and provincial authorities. A total of 199 films were produced before the series was canceled in 1959.

== See also ==
- United Nations
