= The War Is Over (1945 film) =

- Title frame
- Narrated by: Lorne Greene
- Production company: National Film Board of Canada
- Distributed by: National Film Board of Canada
- Release date: September 1, 1945
- Running time: 5 minutes
- Country: Canada
- Language: English

The War Is Over is a 1945 five-minute Canadian short newsreel produced by the National Film Board of Canada (NFB). The War Is Over documents the end of the Second World War. The French version of the film is titled La guerre est finie.

== Synopsis ==
On August 14, 1945, the United Nations at war with the Axis powers celebrated VJ Day, the day on which Japan surrendered in the Second World War. While Canadians celebrated in the streets, troops ships begin bringing back Canadian military forces, ready to come back to a peaceful and prosperous Canada.

Great mobilization of the Canadian domestic workforce in mining, agriculture and industrial sectors had led to a significant war effort. Building on its industrial prowess, and harnessing the nation's rich natural resources, Canada was about to embark on a new, brighter future of unlimited horizons.

== Production ==
The War Is Over was part of the NFB's series of short newsreel films that dealt with war news as well as contemporary issues in Canada. The film used the format of a compilation documentary film edited to provide a coherent story, that relied heavily on newsreel material in order to provide the background to the dialogue. Principal photography took place in less than 72 hours.

The deep baritone voice of stage actor Lorne Greene was featured in the narration of The War Is Over. Greene was known for his work on both radio broadcasts as a news announcer at CBC, as well as narrating many of the Canada Carries On series. His sonorous recitation led to his nickname, "The Voice of Canada", and to some observers, the "voice-of-God". When reading grim battle statistics, he was known as "The Voice of Doom".

== Reception ==
The War Is Over was primarily a newsreel intended for theatrical showings and was shown on "all the screens of the country on the eve of the day of the armistice with Japan". (Note: The formal signing of the Japanese Instrument of Surrender took place on board the battleship USS Missouri in Tokyo Bay on September 2, 1945, and at that time, U.S. President Harry S. Truman declared September 2 to be the official V-J Day.)
