= The Voice of Action =

- Title frame
- Directed by: James Beveridge
- Produced by: Raymond Spottiswoode
- Starring: Lorne Greene
- Narrated by: Lorne Greene
- Cinematography: Grant McLean
- Music by: Lucio Agostini
- Production company: National Film Board of Canada (NFB)
- Distributed by: Columbia Pictures of Canada
- Release date: 1942
- Running time: 16 minutes
- Country: Canada
- Language: English

The Voice of Action is a 16-minute 1942 Canadian documentary film, directed by James Beveridge and produced by Raymond Spottiswoode. The short film was made by the National Film Board of Canada (NFB) as part of the wartime Canada Carries On series. The Voice of Action describes the importance of the Canadian Broadcasting Corporation (CBC) in the Second World War. The French version title of The Voice of Action is Dynamisme des ondes.

== Synopsis ==
From its earliest beginnings in 1901, with Guglielmo Marconi's experiments in long-distance radio transmission from Signal Hill in St John's, Newfoundland, radio played an important role in conquering the vast distances of Canada.

During the 1930s, the Canadian Broadcasting Corporation operated a nationwide radio network that provided local, national and international news and entertainment programs. The broadcasts served to connect rural and urban communities and helped to create unity for a widely scattered population. In northern and remote regions, radio was used to guide aircraft and to aid maritime navigation. Over 10,000 miles of landlines stretched across Canada, providing radio access for 93% of the populace. The familiar voices of CBC news readers and commentators such as Lorne Greene became part of the national psyche.

When war came, the CBC took an active role in providing the nation with timely information about the war effort. War correspondents such as Matthew Halton went directly to the battlefields, joining compatriots from Great Britain, the United States and Russia at the front lines. (Note: Journalists from the Axis powers also recognized the power of radio and used the medium to effect.)

On the home front, CBC broadcasters also sought out personal accounts from individuals directly involved in farm and industrial activities. Public forums hosted by experts in the field were also used to gain insight in issues that were of primary importance to the populace. CBC journalists also appeared on National Film Board of Canada trailers and short films that were shown nationally and for troops abroad.

== Cast ==
- Lorne Greene as himself (archival footage)
- Matthew Halton as himself (archival footage)
- Charles Lynch as himself (archival footage)
- Guglielmo Marconi as himself (archival footage)
- General A.G.L. McNaughton as himself (archival footage) (Note: While not appearing on screen, General McNaughton's voice is heard on a radio broadcast.)

== Production ==
Typical of many of the NFB's Second World War documentary short films in the Canada Carries On series, The Voice of Action was created as an information film with a limited propaganda message. The film was a compilation documentary that relied heavily on newsreel footage shot by the Canadian armed forces, and other Allied film units, but also included footage shot for the film.

Stage actor Lorne Greene was featured in The Voice of Action. Greene was known for his work on radio broadcasts as a news announcer at CBC, as well as narrating many of the Canada Carries On series. His sonorous recitation and deep baritone voice, led to his nickname, "The Voice of Canada", and to some observers, the "voice-of-God". When reading grim battle statistics or narrating a particularly serious topic, he was known as "The Voice of Doom".

== Reception ==
The Voice of Action was produced in 35 mm for the theatrical market. Each film was shown over a six-month period as part of the shorts or newsreel segments in approximately 800 theatres across Canada. The NFB had an arrangement with Famous Players theatres to ensure that Canadians from coast-to-coast could see them, with further distribution by Columbia Pictures. Bookings for the Canada Carries On films continued in Famous Players theatres and other cinemas throughout Canada. Some films were also sold to individual theatres periodically. Columbia Pictures continued to distribute the series, with France Films handling its French counterpart, En Avant Canada, in Quebec and New Brunswick.

After the six-month theatrical tour ended, individual films were made available on 16 mm to schools, libraries, churches and factories, extending the life of these films for another year or two. They were also made available to film libraries operated by university and provincial authorities. A total of 199 films were produced before the series was canceled in 1959.

In his book, Filming Politics: Communism and the Portrayal of the Working Class at the National Film Board of Canada, 1939-46., historian Malek Khouri analyzed the role of the NFB documentaries including The Voice of Action. Khouri noted: "The use of media as an interactive discussion tool to deal with issues of social and economic development is also dealt with in a film about the Canadian Broadcasting Corporation (CBC) ... The significance of the discussion trailers' impact on the political culture of the day is most clearly manifest in their encouragement of debates involving contentions that themselves had major political and ideological connotations. Firstly, these trailers pointed out the prospect of opening media outlets to political debates. In essence, they proposed that public space should also become a space for political action."
