= Look to the North =

- Screenshot of the opening title
- Directed by: James Beveridge
- Produced by: James Beveridge
- Narrated by: Lorne Greene
- Cinematography: Donald Fraser
- Production company: National Film Board of Canada
- Distributed by: Columbia Pictures of Canada
- Release date: 1944
- Running time: 22 minutes
- Country: Canada
- Language: English

Look to the North is a 22-minute 1944 Canadian documentary film, made by the National Film Board of Canada (NFB) as part of the wartime Canada Carries On series. The film was produced and directed by James Beveridge. The title of the film's French version is Vers le Nord.

== Synopsis ==
In 1943, Alaska and Canada's north has become of strategic importance when Japanese forces invade and occupy the Aleutian Islands. Both Canadian and American forces are deployed to protect and defend the region in the Aleutian Islands Campaign. The major obstacles to overcome for troops and war material to reach Alaska are the daunting distances and harsh environment.

For more than a century, fur traders, prospectors and indigenous peoples had populated the region but the Klondike Gold Rush and later Nome Gold Rush in Nome, Alaska had brought a stampede of newcomers who started new settlements but left when the gold ran out. In 1942, when war came to the region, a new boom transformed the abandoned settlements as workers were needed to build an overland route to Alaska.

U.S. Army engineers along with Canadian workers created the Alaska Highway or ALCAN Highway, carved out of the northern bush and forest to bring American troops and supplies northward. Canada's role was to construct airfields alongside the military highway and send ship convoys to supply the various outposts of the northwest, while Royal Canadian Air Force (RCAF) patrol bombers and lookouts keep a constant vigil.

The Northwest Staging Route built by the Canadians was a series of airstrips, airport and radio ranging stations in Alberta, British Columbia and the Yukon. The "skyway" not only supplied the ongoing construction of the Alaska Highway but also served to ferry American lend-lease aircraft for the Soviet Union Air Forces from the United States to Alaska, and then across the Bering Strait to Siberia.

American and Canadian ground and air attacks drove the Japanese out of the Aleutian Islands. The joint military efforts resulted in the Japanese defeat on American soil, changing the Pacific War from a defensive struggle to an offensive against the heart of the Japanese empire.

At the threshold of a new age, Canada's north holds great promise, with farmland, forests, mineral deposits and the discovery of oil fields. The frontier can be exploited by air and the new airfields created for military use also can be the means to connect Canada via polar air routes to the rest of the world.

== Production ==
Typical of the NFB's Second World War documentary short films in the Canada Carries On series, Look to the North was created as a morale boosting propaganda film. The film relied heavily on newsreel material but also included footage shot for the film. Producer and director James Beveridge had previously used footage of the building of the Alaska Highway in his NFB documentary Pincers on Japan (1941).

The deep baritone voice of stage actor Lorne Greene was featured in the narration of Look to the North. Greene was known for his work on both radio broadcasts as a news announcer at CBC as well as narrating many of the Canada Carries On series. His sonorous recitation led to his nickname, "The Voice of Canada", and to some observers, the "voice-of-God". When reading grim battle statistics or narrating a particularly serious topic, he was known as "The Voice of Doom".

== Reception ==
Look to the North was produced in 35 mm for the theatrical market. Each film was shown over a six-month period as part of the shorts or newsreel segments in approximately 800 theatres across Canada. The NFB had an arrangement with Famous Players theatres to ensure that Canadians from coast-to-coast could see them, with further distribution by Columbia Pictures.

After the six-month theatrical tour ended, individual films were made available on 16 mm to schools, libraries, churches and factories, extending the life of these films for another year or two. They were also made available to film libraries operated by university and provincial authorities. A total of 199 films were produced before the series was canceled in 1959.

Film historian Jack C. Ellis, in John Grierson: Life, Contributions, Influence, considered films like Look to the North as NFB head, John Grierson making a political statement about Canada's gaining a "... sense of national identity and pride that had never existed before." The film also was visionary and a "... look to the future."
