= Food - Weapon of Conquest =

- Opening title
- Directed by: Stuart Legg
- Written by: Stuart Legg
- Produced by: Stuart Legg
- Narrated by: Lorne Greene
- Edited by: Stuart Legg
- Production company: National Film Board of Canada
- Distributed by: Columbia Pictures of Canada
- Release date: 1941
- Running time: 22 minutes
- Country: Canada
- Language: English

Food - Weapon of Conquest is a 22-minute 1941 Canadian documentary film, made by the National Film Board of Canada (NFB) as part of the wartime Canada Carries On series. The film was written, directed and produced by Stuart Legg. Food - Weapon of Conquest shows the food shortage in Nazi-occupied countries in the Second World War, contrasted with the Allied response to the global food crisis. The film's French version title is Une armée marche sur son estomac.

== Synopsis ==
During the Second World War, food has become a weapon of war, validating Napoleon's adage that "An army moves on its stomach." In Allied nations such as the United States and Canada, vast reserves of farmland have to be harnessed to meet the needs of the war effort. While rationing is still in place in Canada for civilians, the food produced in the Prairies has been made available to the overseas military forces.

In other Allied nations, food scarcity is a daily misery. The United Kingdom faces a serious crisis when Nazi U-boats impose blockades on the high seas. Even with its increase in farmland, only one half of its needs can be obtained through domestic food production, the rest must come from abroad. In the war-torn Soviet Union, Nazi conquest of Ukraine's wheat fields have led to breadlines which have now become commonplace with the populace facing starvation unless more food can be obtained.

During the First World War, Germany was confronted by wide-scale shortages in food, leading to a breakdown in the will to fight. Hunger brought about Germany's collapse, and the vivid memories of the time of deprivation led to the rise of the Nazi Party led by Adolf Hitler.

During the inter-war years, Nazi Germany used a frugal "guns or butter" policy, with food producers ordered to assist the war aims of the Nazi government. New uses for food products included fat as a component for high explosives, apples to be turned into synthetic fuel and milk made into lubricating oil. German scientists created other synthetic items including a soy substitute for meat, with the purpose of making the nation self-sufficient in food.

In Italy, self-sufficiency in food is also a goal for the Fascist regime led by Benito Mussolini who attempted to re-establish Italy's former glory. His efforts to reinvigorate the nation began with a campaign to increase its population, necessitating a tripling of food production.

The food shortage in Nazi-occupied countries is mainly the result of a strategic policy, the Hunger Plan (Der Hungerplan also Der Backe-Plan). The objective of the Nazi Hunger Plan was to inflict deliberate mass starvation on the Slavic civilian populations under German occupation by directing all food supplies to the German home population and the Wehrmacht on the Eastern Front.

Other conquered lands such as Greece and France also face drastic shortages of food. What is allowed, is doled out in grudging order by the Nazis, with the quislings and collaborators being fed first, while ordinary citizens wait their turn and Jews and the insane thrown scraps of what is left over. When the Allied forces are finally able to liberate the conquered peoples of Europe and Asia, providing an adequate supply of food will be one of the first priorities.

The wartime leaders of the Western world also have to face the challenge of feeding their own people, and during the postwar years, the inevitable need to feed hundreds of millions across the globe.

== Cast ==
- Benito Mussolini as Himself (archival footage)
- Reich Minister of Food and Agriculture Richard Walther Darré as Himself (archival footage)
- Adolf Hitler as Himself (archival footage)
- Joseph Goebbels as Himself (archival footage)
- Adolf Galland as Himself (archival footage)

== Production ==
Typical of the NFB's Second World War documentary short films in the Canada Carries On series, Food - Weapon of Conquest was made in cooperation with the Director of Public Information, Herbert Lash. The film was created as a morale boosting propaganda film. Food - Weapon of Conquest was a compilation documentary that relied heavily on newsreel material including "enemy" footage, in order to provide the background to the dialogue. (Note: Enemy footage was provided care of the Alien Property Custodian.)

The deep baritone voice of stage actor Lorne Greene was featured in the narration of Food - Weapon of Conquest. Greene was known for his work on both radio broadcasts as a news announcer at CBC as well as narrating many of the Canada Carries On series. His sonorous recitation led to his nickname, "The Voice of Canada", and to some observers, the "voice-of-God". When reading grim battle statistics or narrating a particularly serious topic, he was known as "The Voice of Doom".

== Reception ==
Food - Weapon of Conquest was produced in 35 mm for the theatrical market. Each film was shown over a six-month period as part of the shorts or newsreel segments in approximately 800 theatres across Canada. The NFB had an arrangement with Famous Players theatres to ensure that Canadians from coast-to-coast could see them, with further distribution by Columbia Pictures.

After the six-month theatrical tour ended, individual films were made available on 16 mm to schools, libraries, churches and factories, extending the life of these films for another year or two. They were also made available to film libraries operated by university and provincial authorities. A total of 199 films were produced before the series was canceled in 1959.

== See also ==
- The Home Front (1940)
- Food power
