= James Beveridge =

- James Beveridge c. 1950
- Born: August 12, 1917; Vancouver, British Columbia
- Died: February 16, 1993 (aged 75); Toronto, Ontario
- Education: University of British Columbia
- Occupations: Filmmaker, Teacher
- Known for: Filmmaking, Writing
- Spouses: Jane Marsh Beveridge (1945); Margaret Coventry (1954- death)

James Beveridge (1917–1993) was a Canadian filmmaker, author and educator. Beveridge was a pioneering filmmaker at the National Film Board of Canada (NFB) and became Head of Production at the NFB in the post-war years.

== Early years ==
James Alexander Beveridge was born and raised in Vancouver; his father died when he was 8, his mother when he was 12 and he was raised by family members. After completing his bachelor's degree in journalism at the University of British Columbia, he received an Imperial Relations Trust Bursary to travel to England, where he intended to write a book on the history of film. In 1939, while seeking sponsors for his book in London, he met the documentary filmmaker, John Grierson who had recently left the employ of the GPO Film Unit; he suggested that Beveridge go to the GFU to learn about documentary filmmaking.

== Filmmaking career ==
In 1939, Canada created the National Film Commission, which soon became the National Film Board of Canada. In October 1939, Grierson became the NFB's first commissioner. He hired Beveridge, first as a film cutter, then as an editor. During the war, in various duties as editor, director and producer, Beveridge worked on more than 80 documentary films. Films he directed, include The Voice of Action (1942), Banshees Over Canada (1943) and Look to the North (1944).

Beveridge became a war correspondent in the Royal Canadian Air Force, serving in Europe from 1944 to 1945. After the war, from 1947 to 1949, he was Head of Production at the NFB. From 1951 to 1954, he was in charge of the NFB's European Office, based in London. After 1954, he worked occasionally as an independent producer on contract to the NFB, before leaving the Board completely in 1962.

Seeking work internationally, in 1954, Beveridge began a project in India for the Burma Shell Oil Company, for which he produced and directed 40 training films. During his time in India, his film, Himalayan Tapestry; The Craftsmen of Kashmir (1957) won the 1957 President's Gold Medal Award for Best Documentary Film.

In 1961, after a stint as host and moderator on the CBC public affairs television series Lets Face It, Beveridge became the Director of the North Carolina Film Board, where he produced 15 half-hour documentary and educational films from 1962 to 1964.

Beveridge returned to Canada to head his own production company in 1965, producing a multi-screen presentation in the Man in Control pavilion at Expo 1967. From 1970, his filmmaking work took him back to the Far East. While in Japan, he produced Hands (1975) for Mobil Sekiyu Oil Company, winning the Grand Prize at the 1975 World Craft Council Film Festival in New York. Beveridge was also the scriptwriter on Transformations (1977) for the Indian Ministry of Heavy Industries.

Beveridge continued to be active as a filmmaker for the rest of his life, contributing as a screenwriter, consultant and advisor on a number of international projects.

== Teaching ==
In 1970, Beveridge began teaching, as well as acting as a consultant to nascent rural television programs for UNESCO in India. In the same year, he established the Department of Film at York University, Toronto and went on to launch the university's graduate film studies program, the first of its kind in Canada. While maintaining an active international career as a filmmaker, advocate and educator, he also taught at York University intermittently until 1987. During his tenure, Beveridge promoted joint ventures with India and developed a national program for adult literacy, sponsored by UNESCO.

== Writing ==
In recounting his work at the NFB and his close association with John Grierson, Beveridge was the author of John Grierson: Film Master (1978). He was also the author of Script Writing for Short Films (1969) and co-author with Wilbur Lang Schramm, of Television and the Social Education of Women: A First Report on the Unesco-Senegal Pilot Project at Dakar, Issues 49-58 (1967). In 2006, Beveridge's life was made the subject of a film written and directed by his daughter, York alumna Nina Beveridge, entitled The Idealist: James Beveridge, Film Guru, which won the Platinum Remi Award for World Peace and Understanding at the 39th WorldFest-Houston International Film Festival.

== Personal life ==
Beveridge had a short-lived marriage to fellow NFB filmmaker Jane Smart (who retained her married name for the rest of her life). In 1954, he married Margaret Coventry, also an NFB colleague; they had three children.
