= Sydney Newman =

Canadian film and television producer (1917–1997)

Sydney Newman OC
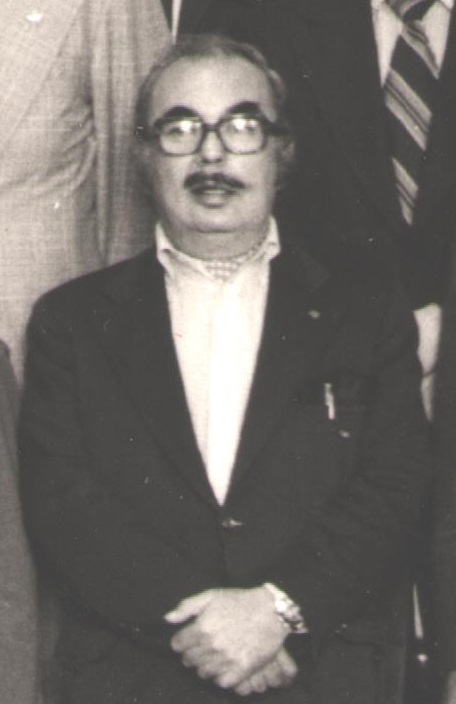
- Newman at the Canadian media delegation to China in 1974
- Born: Sydney Cecil Nudelman; April 1, 1917; Toronto, Canada
- Died: October 30, 1997 (aged 80); Toronto, Canada
- Occupations: Producer; screenwriter
- Known for: Creating The Avengers and Doctor Who

Sydney Cecil Newman (né Nudelman; April 1, 1917 – October 30, 1997) was a Canadian television producer and screenwriter who played a pioneering role in British television drama from the late 1950s to the late 1960s. After his return to Canada in 1970, he was appointed acting director of the Broadcast Programs Branch for the Canadian Radio and Television Commission (CRTC) and then head of the National Film Board of Canada (NFB). He also occupied senior positions at the Canadian Film Development Corporation and Canadian Broadcasting Corporation, and acted as an advisor to the Secretary of State.

During his time in Britain in the 1950s and 1960s, Newman worked first with ABC Weekend TV before moving across to the BBC in 1962, holding the role of Head of Drama with both organisations. During this phase of his career, he created the spy-fi series The Avengers and created the science-fiction series Doctor Who, as well as overseeing the production of groundbreaking social realist drama series such as Armchair Theatre and The Wednesday Play.

The Museum of Broadcast Communications describes Newman as "the most significant agent in the development of British television drama". His obituary in The Guardian declared that "for ten brief but glorious years, Sydney Newman ... was the most important impresario in Britain ... His death marks not just the end of an era but the laying to rest of a whole philosophy of popular art." In Quebec, as commissioner of the NFB, he attracted controversy for his decision to suppress distribution of several politically sensitive films by French-Canadian directors.

== Early career in Canada ==
=== Early life and the NFB ===
Sydney Cecil Nudelman was born in Toronto on April 1, 1917, the son of a Russian-Jewish immigrants. His father ran a shoe shop. After studying at Ogden Public School, which he left at the age of 13, he later enrolled in the Central Technical School, studying art and design subjects. He initially attempted to follow a career as a stills photographer and an artist, specialising in drawing film posters. However, he found it so difficult to earn enough money to make a living from this profession that he switched to working in the film industry itself.

In 1938, Newman travelled to Hollywood, where he was offered a role with the Walt Disney Company on the strength of his graphic design work. However, he was unable to take the job because he could not secure a work permit. Returning to Canada in 1941, he gained a job as a film editor at the National Film Board of Canada. He was eventually to work on over 350 films while an editor for the NFB. During the Second World War the head of the NFB, John Grierson, promoted Newman to film producer, working on documentaries and propaganda films, including Fighting Norway, which he directed. In 1944, he was made executive producer of Canada Carries On, a long-running series of such films. In 1949, the NFB invited him into television, then a new industry, on a one-year attachment to NBC in New York City. His assignment there was to compile reports for the Canadian government on American television techniques, focusing on dramas, documentaries and outside broadcasts.

=== CBC Television ===
One of Newman's reports on outside broadcasting was seen and admired by executives at the Canadian Broadcasting Corporation (CBC), and in 1952 he joined the corporation as its Supervising Director of Features, Documentaries and Outside Broadcasts. There he was involved in producing not only some of the earliest television editions of Hockey Night in Canada, but also the first Canadian Football League game to be shown on television. After his experience of seeing the production of television plays in New York, he was eager to work in drama despite, by his own admission, "knowing nothing about drama". He was nonetheless able to persuade his superiors at CBC to make him Supervisor of Drama Production in 1954. In this position he encouraged a new wave of young writers and directors, including Ted Kotcheff and Arthur Hailey, and oversaw shows such as the popular General Motors Theatre.

Writing in 1990, the journalist Paul Rutherford felt that during his time at the CBC in the 1950s, Newman had been a "great champion of both realistic and Canadian drama". He felt that Newman "came to fulfil the role of the drama impresario with the vision to push people to develop a high-quality and popular style of drama".

Several of the General Motors Theatre plays, including Hailey's Flight into Danger, were purchased for screening by the BBC in the United Kingdom. The productions impressed Howard Thomas, who was the managing director of ABC Weekend TV, the franchise holder for the rival ITV network in the English Midlands and the North at weekends. Thomas offered Newman a job with ABC as a producer of his own Saturday night thriller series, which Newman accepted, moving to Britain in 1958. In 1975 the Head of Drama at the CBC, John Hirsch, noted that the tendency of so many writers and directors, having followed Newman to the UK in the 1950s, to never return to work in Canada had a detrimental impact on the standard of subsequent Canadian television drama.

== ABC Weekend TV and ITV ==
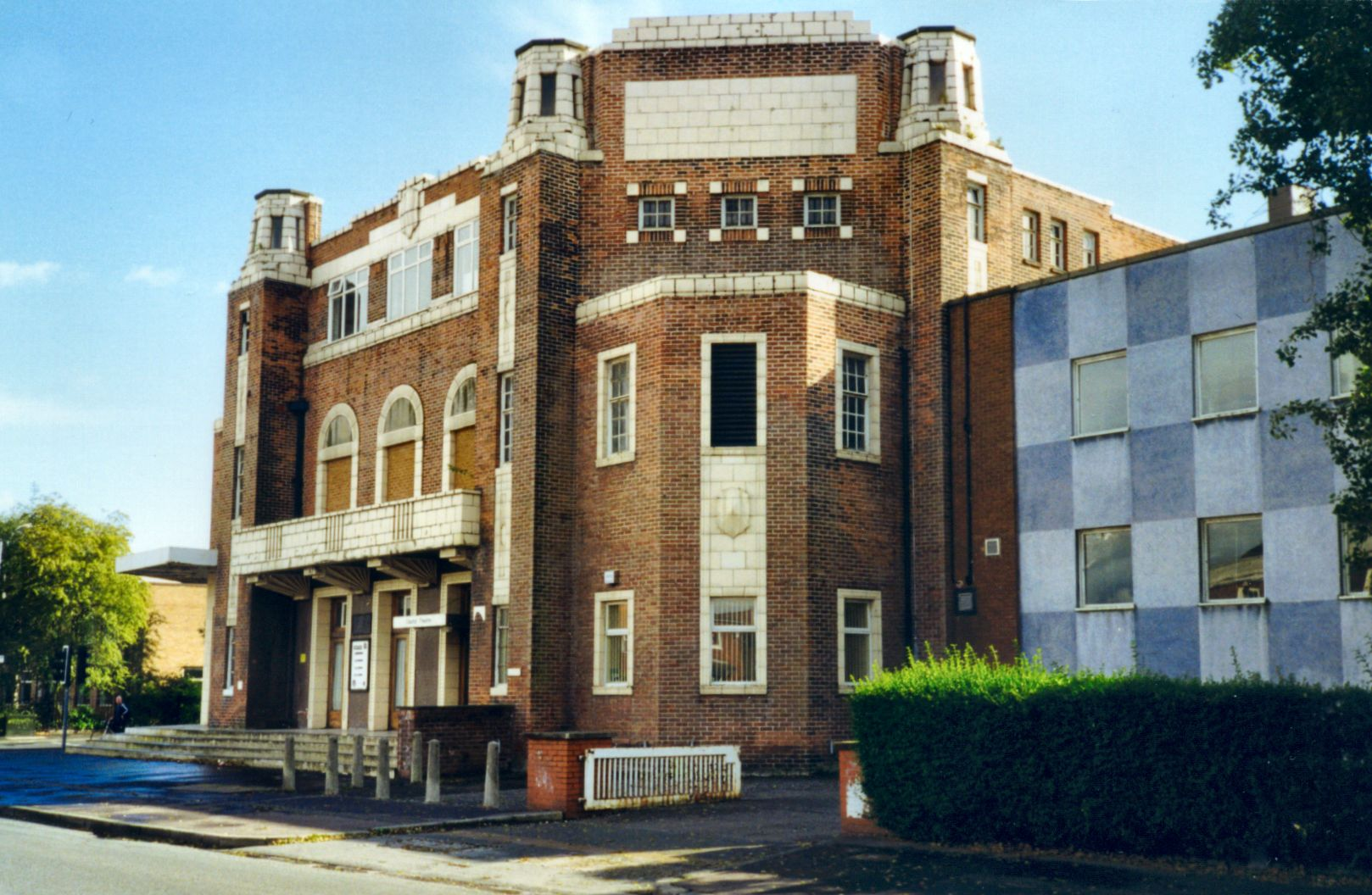
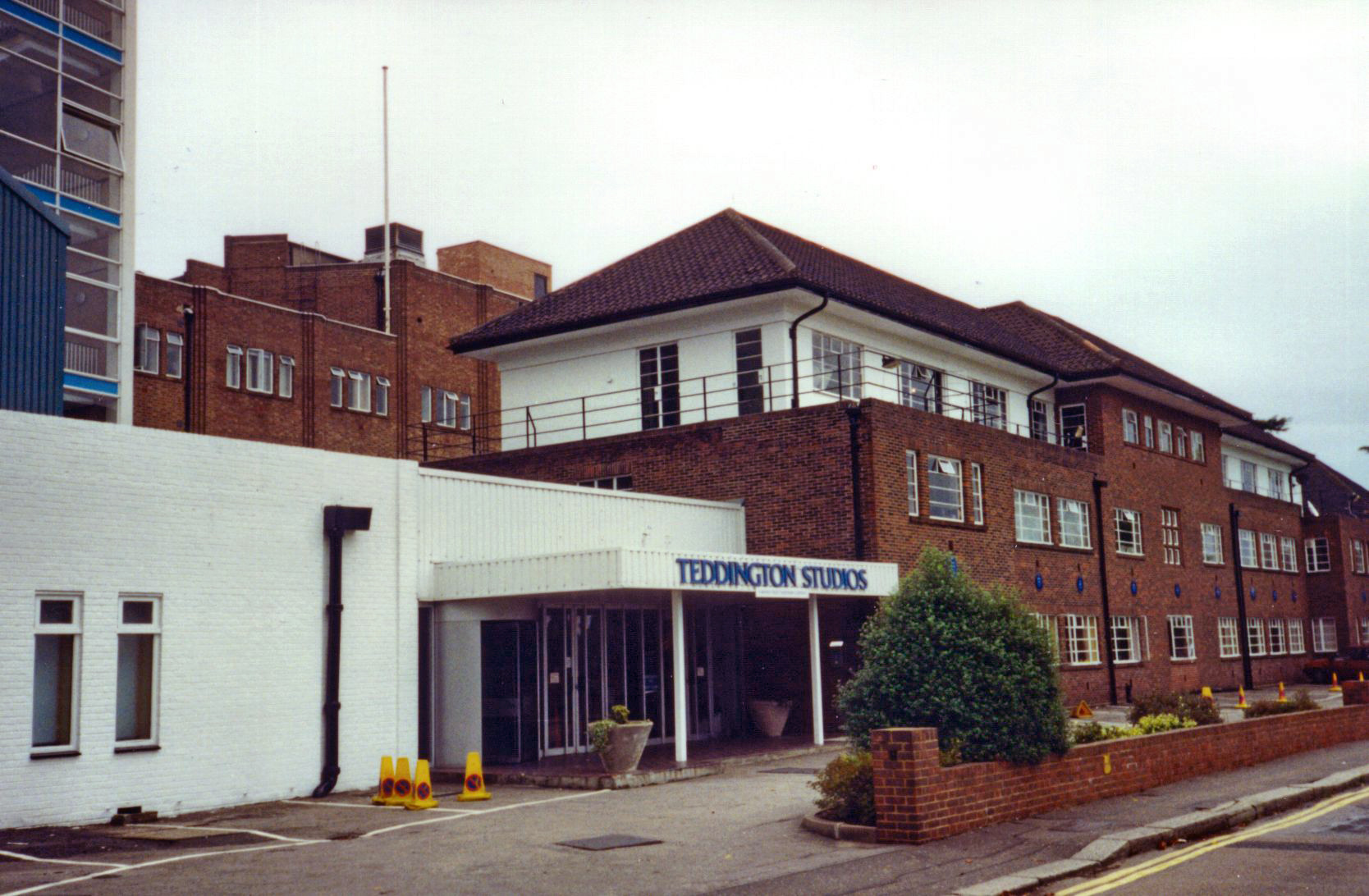
ABC's studios in Didsbury, Manchester, and Teddington, London, where Newman pioneered Armchair Theatre and The Avengers

Soon after Newman arrived in the UK, ABC's Head of Drama Dennis Vance was moved into a more senior position with the company, and Thomas offered Newman his position, which the Canadian quickly accepted. He was, however, somewhat disparaging of the state in which he found British television drama. "At that time, I found this country to be somewhat class-ridden," he reminisced to interviewers in 1988. "The only legitimate theatre was of the 'anyone for tennis' variety, which on the whole gave a condescending view of working-class people. Television dramas were usually adaptations of stage plays and invariably about the upper classes. I said, 'Damn the upper classes: they don't even own televisions!'"

Newman's principal tool for shaking up this established order was a programme which had been initiated before he had arrived at ABC, Armchair Theatre. This anthology series was networked nationally across the ITV regions on Sunday evenings, and in 1959 was in the top ten of the ratings for 32 out of the 37 weeks it was broadcast, with audiences of over 12 million viewers. Newman used the strand to present plays by writers such as Alun Owen, Harold Pinter and Clive Exton, also bringing over associates from Canada such as Charles Jarrott and Ted Kotcheff. Writing in 2000, the television historian John Caughie stated that "Newman's insistence that the series would use only original material written for television made Armchair Theatre a decisive moment in the history of British television drama."

In 1960 Newman devised a thriller series for ABC called Police Surgeon, starring Ian Hendry. Although Police Surgeon was not a success and was cancelled after only a short run, Newman took Hendry as the star, and some of the ethos of the programme, to create a new series (not a direct sequel as is sometimes claimed) called The Avengers. Debuting in January 1961, The Avengers became an international success, although in later years its premise differed somewhat from Newman's initial set-up, veering into more humorous territory rather than remaining a gritty thriller.

Newman's great success at ABC had been noted by the British Broadcasting Corporation, whose executives were keen to revive their own drama department's fortunes in the face of fierce competition from ITV. In 1961 the BBC's Director of Television, Kenneth Adam, met with Newman and offered him the position of Head of Drama at the BBC. He accepted the position, eager for a new challenge, although he was obliged to remain with ABC until the expiration of his contract in December 1962, after which he immediately began work with the BBC.

== BBC ==
=== Arrival and impact ===
There was some initial resentment to his appointment within the corporation, as he was an outsider and he was also earning more than many of the executives senior to him, although still substantially less than he had been paid at ABC. As he had done at ABC, he was keen to shake up the staid image of BBC drama and introduce new outlets for the kitchen sink drama and the "Angry Young Men" of the era. He also divided the drama department into three divisions—series, serials and plays.

In 1964 he and Kenneth Adam initiated the anthology series The Wednesday Play, a BBC equivalent of Armchair Theatre, which had great success and critical acclaim with plays written and directed by the likes of Dennis Potter, Jeremy Sandford and Ken Loach. The strand attracted comment and debate for several of its productions, such as Cathy Come Home, a Tony Garnett production of a Jeremy Sandford script, which portrayed homelessness. There were also problems caused by Newman bringing in freelance directors to work on the programme, who sometimes overspent on their plays to try and increase their impact; with staff directors this could be compensated by reducing the budget of a subsequent production, but for a freelancer there would be no such recourse.

Shaun Sutton was one of the drama producers who worked under Newman at the BBC, and later succeeded him as Head of Drama. He later wrote that Newman "galvanised television drama ... [He created] a climate in which boldness paid". Don Taylor, who was a director in the drama department at the time, later claimed that he felt Newman was unsuited to the position of Head of Drama, writing: "To put it brutally, I was deeply offended that the premier position in television drama, at a time when it really was the National Theatre of the Air, had been given to a man whose values were entirely commercial, and who had no more than a layman's knowledge of the English theatrical tradition, let alone the drama of Europe and the wider world."

Newman's biography at the Museum of Broadcast Communications website points out that much of the work Newman is credited for at the BBC was little different from that which had been undertaken by his predecessor Michael Barry, who "also attracted new young original writers ... and hired young directors ... However, it was the newness and innovation which Newman encouraged in his drama output that is most significant: his concentration on the potential of television as television, for a mass not a middlebrow audience." The academic Madeleine Macmurraugh-Kavanagh has criticised some of the eulogistic views of Newman's time at the BBC: "When archive and press material emanating from the 1964–65 period is examined, an interesting gap appears between what Newman seemed likely to accomplish and what he finally did accomplish ... Also relevant to the mythology that has sprung up around Newman is the fact that his favoured dramatic material was interpreted by some as being rather less radical than it seemed."

=== Doctor Who ===
In 1963 he initiated the creation of a science fiction television series, Doctor Who. The series has been described by the British Film Institute as having "created a phenomenon unlike any other British TV programme" and by The Times newspaper as "quintessential to being British". Newman had long been a science-fiction fan: "[U]p to the age of 40, I don't think there was a science-fiction book I hadn't read. I love them because they're a marvellous way—and a safe way, I might add—of saying nasty things about our own society."

When Controller of BBC Television Donald Baverstock told Newman of the need for a programme to bridge the gap between the sports showcase Grandstand and pop music programme Juke Box Jury on Saturday evenings, he decided that a science-fiction drama would be the perfect vehicle for filling the gap and gaining a family audience. Although much work on the genesis of the series was done by Donald Wilson, C. E. Webber and others, it was Newman who created the idea of the TARDIS, a time machine larger on the inside, and the character of the mysterious "Doctor", both of which remain at the heart of the programme. The origin of the title Doctor Who is less clear; actor and director Hugh David later credited this to his friend Rex Tucker, the initial "caretaker producer" of the programme, although Tucker said the title had come from Newman. In a 1971 interview, Donald Wilson claimed to have named the series and when this claim was put to Newman he did not dispute it.

After the series had been conceived, Newman approached Don Taylor and then Shaun Sutton to produce it, although both declined. Newman then decided on his former production assistant at ABC, Verity Lambert, who had never produced, written or directed, but she readily accepted his offer. As Lambert became the youngest—and only female—drama producer at the BBC, there were some doubts as to Newman's choice, but she became a success in the role. Even Newman clashed with her on occasion, particularly over the inclusion of the alien Dalek creatures in the programme. Newman had not wanted any "bug-eyed monsters" in the show but he was placated when the creatures became a great success. In the 2007 Doctor Who episode "Human Nature", the Doctor (in human form as "John Smith") refers to his parents Sydney and Verity, a tribute to both Newman and Lambert.

=== Other work and departure ===
Newman also had success with more traditional BBC fare such as the costume drama The Forsyte Saga in 1967, a Donald Wilson project on which Newman had not initially been keen. It became one of the most acclaimed and popular productions of his era, watched by 100 million people in 26 countries. After also initiating other popular series such as Adam Adamant Lives!, at the end of 1967 Newman's five-year contract with the BBC came to an end, and he did not remain with the corporation. Newman returned to the film industry, taking a job as a producer with Associated British Picture Corporation. "I want to get away from my executive's chair and become a creative worker again", he told The Sun newspaper of his decision. The British film industry was entering a period of decline and none of Newman's projects went into production. ABPC was taken over by EMI and at the end of June 1969, Newman was dismissed from the company, later describing his eighteen months there as "a futile waste". Despite being offered an executive producership by the BBC, keen to regain his services on the day he left ABPC, Newman decided to return to Canada. He left the UK on January 3, 1970, leading The Sunday Times to comment that "British television will never be the same again".

== Return to Canada ==
=== Chairman of the NFB ===
His first post upon returning to his home country was an advisory position with the Canadian Radio and Television Commission (CRTC) in Ottawa, where he battled Canada's private broadcasters, especially CTV, over new Canadian content regulations. This lasted for only a few months, before in August 1970 he became the new Government Film Commissioner, the Chairman of the National Film Board of Canada, returning to the same institution for which he had worked in the 1940s. In this role he experienced considerable problems in Quebec resulting from the fact that he did not speak French, at a time when the NFB's French Program branch was attracting young Quebec nationalist filmmakers. Some staff members also felt that he had been away from the NFB for too long, while the filmmaker Denys Arcand felt that Newman did not understand Quebec culture.

Newman was able to improve the NFB's relations with broadcaster CBC, securing prime-time television slots for several productions, although he was criticised by some filmmakers for allowing the CBC to screen NFB films with commercial interruptions. He also moved the NFB entirely over to color film production. However, the Toronto Star's Martin Knelman felt that Newman was "mired in political warfare and administrative chaos". He was responsible for censoring or banning several productions, including Arcand's On est au coton and Gilles Groulx's 24 heures ou plus. These films were concerned, respectively, with the conditions of textile factory workers and critiquing consumer society. Such censorship or banning resulted in some critics attacking Newman for being anti-working-class and pro-capitalist.

Newman had a mixed record with French-language films. He defended Pierre Perrault's Un pays sans bon sens! to a committee of parliament in 1971, but in the same year personally rejected the release of Michel Brault's film about the October Crisis, Orders (Les Ordres). This was despite the fact that the film had already been approved by the board's French-language committee, and it was not eventually released until Brault personally released it in 1974.

Newman himself had been regarded as a possible terrorist abduction target during the October Crisis, and armed guards had patrolled the headquarters of the NFB. Newman was concerned about the idea of releasing films with Quebec nationalist themes, such as Groulx's 24 heures ou plus, at such a tense political time, worried about what the Canadian public would think. Although it was Newman's deputy André Lamy who in some cases drew the monolingual Newman's attention to the controversial nature of French-language productions, it was Lamy himself who later permitted the release of some of these same films after he succeeded Newman as Government Film Commissioner.

When Newman's contract with the NFB came to an end in 1975, it was not renewed. Film historian Gerald Pratley claims that by this point, the NFB was "an almost-forgotten institution" due to "the stupor that had overtaken it." The writer Richard Collins felt that "the very experiences that enabled [Newman] to recognize the nature of the NFB's problem and the need for a change of diction and reorientation to the tastes of Canadians had left him out of touch with Canada." For his part, Newman felt that the NFB's French program had not made enough effort to communicate with people in English Canada or to make films that were relevant to "the ordinary men, who have no particular axe to grind."

Newman went on to become a Special Advisor on Film to the Secretary of State, and from 1978 until 1984 he was Chief Creative Consultant to the Canadian Film Development Corporation.

=== Later years ===
Newman was awarded the Order of Canada in 1981, the country's highest civilian honour. Shortly thereafter he returned to live in Britain again for some time following the death in 1981 of his wife Elizabeth McRae, to whom he had been married since 1944. His main reason for going back to the UK was to attempt, unsuccessfully, to produce a drama series about the Bloomsbury Group for the new Channel 4 network.

In 1986, the then Controller of BBC One, Michael Grade, unhappy with the current state of Doctor Who, wrote to Newman to enquire whether he had any ideas for reformatting the series, which was at the time struggling in the ratings and with its star Colin Baker about to be fired by Grade. On October 6, 1986, Newman wrote back to Grade with a suggestion that he take direct control of the series as executive producer, that Patrick Troughton should return to the role of the Doctor for a season, and then regenerate into a female, with Newman suggesting either Joanna Lumley, Dawn French or Frances de la Tour to succeed Troughton. Grade then suggested that Newman meet the current Head of Drama, Jonathan Powell, for lunch to discuss the Canadian's ideas. Newman and Powell did not get on well, however, and nothing came of their meeting. Newman was also unsuccessful in an attempt to have his name added to the end credits of the show as its creator. Acting Head of Series & Serials Ken Riddington, to whom Newman's request had been referred, wrote to him that "Heads of Department who originate programmes have to be satisfied with the other rewards that flow from doing so."

Newman returned to Canada again in the 1990s, where he died of a heart attack in Toronto in 1997, aged 80. At the time of his death, his partner was Marion McDougall.

== Legacy ==
In September 2003, a version of Newman played by actor Ian Brooker appeared in the straight-to-CD Doctor Who Unbound radio play Deadline, written by Rob Shearman and released by Big Finish Productions. The play was set in a world in which Doctor Who had never been created, existing only in the imagination and memories of fictional writer Martin Bannister, played by Derek Jacobi. As part of the plot of the play, Bannister was unable to clearly remember whether Newman had been Canadian or Australian, with the Newman character's accent changing according to Bannister's varying memories.

For the fiftieth anniversary of Doctor Who in 2013, BBC television commissioned a dramatisation of the events surrounding the creation of the series, entitled An Adventure in Space and Time and written by Mark Gatiss. Newman was portrayed by Scottish actor Brian Cox.

A biography of Newman by Ryan Danes, titled The Man Who Thought Outside the Box, was released in April 2017 by Digital Entropy Publishing.

== Bibliography ==
- Danes, Ryan (2017). The Man Who Thought Outside the Box: The Life and Times of Doctor Who Creator Sydney Newman. Digital Entropy. ISBN 978-0993094217.
- Howe, David J.; Walker, Stephen James; Stammers, Mark (1994). The Handbook: The First Doctor – The William Hartnell Years, 1963–1966. Virgin Books. ISBN 0-426-20430-1.
- Dunkley, Christopher. "A hard act to follow." Financial Times. Wednesday November 5, 1997 (page 23).

Media offices
Preceded by Michael Barry	BBC Television Head of Drama; 1962–1967	Succeeded by Shaun Sutton
Cultural offices
Preceded by Hugo McPherson	Government Film Commissioner and Chairperson of the National Film Board of Canada; 1970–1975	Succeeded by André Lamy
