= United States home front during World War II =

United States Home Front
- 1942–1945
Great Depression	Post-war era
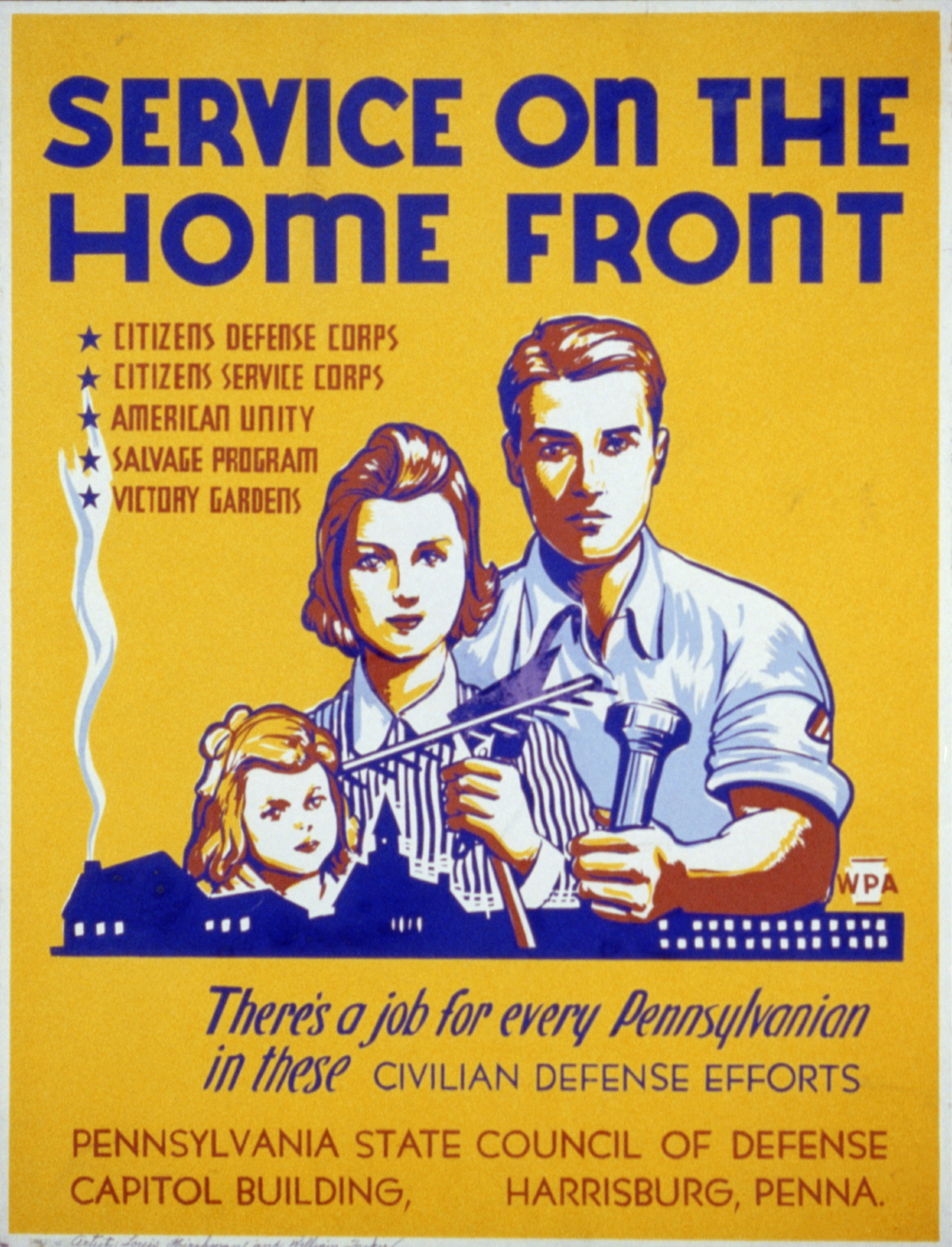
- Service on the Home Front by Louis Hirshman and William Tasker.
- Location: United States
- Including: New Deal Era; Second Great Migration
- President(s): Franklin Delano Roosevelt; Harry Truman
- Key events: Attack on Pearl Harbor; Double V campaign Rationing; Internment policies Conscription; G.I. Bill

The United States home front during World War II supported the war effort in many ways, including a wide range of volunteer efforts and submitting to government-managed rationing and price controls. There was a general feeling of agreement that the sacrifices were for the national good during the war.

The labor market changed radically during World War II. Peacetime conflicts concerning race and labor took on a special dimension because of the pressure for national unity. The Hollywood film industry was important for propaganda. Every aspect of life from politics to personal savings changed when put on a wartime footing. This was achieved by tens of millions of workers moving from low to high productivity jobs in industrial centers. Millions of students, retirees, housewives, and unemployed moved into the active labor force. The hours they had to work increased dramatically as the time for leisure activities declined sharply.

Gasoline, meat, clothing, and footwear were tightly rationed. Most families were allocated 3 US gallons (11 L; 2.5 imp gal) of gasoline a week, which sharply curtailed driving for any purpose. Production of most durable goods, such as new housing, vacuum cleaners, and kitchen appliances, was banned until the war ended. In industrial areas housing was in short supply as people doubled up and lived in cramped quarters. Prices and wages were controlled. Americans saved a high portion of their incomes, which led to renewed growth after the war.

== Full employment and federal economic policies ==
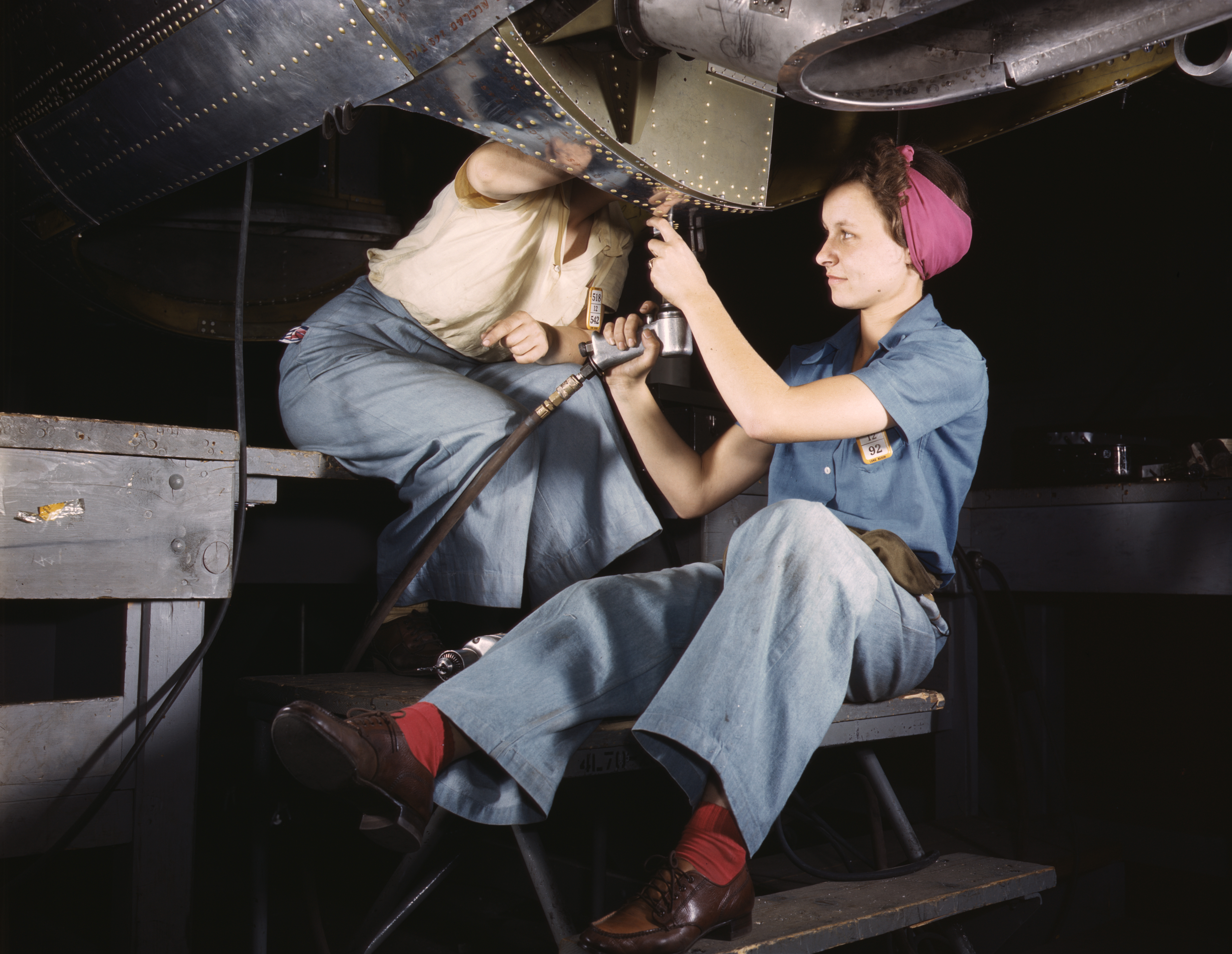
Female factory workers bucking rivets during manufacture of an aircraft in 1942, Long Beach, California

The US reached full employment after entering World War II in December 1941. Under the special circumstances of war mobilization, massive war spending doubled the gross national product (GNP). Military Keynesianism brought full employment and federal contracts were cost-plus. Instead of competitive bidding to get lower prices, the government gave out contracts that promised to pay all the expenses plus a modest profit. Factories hired everyone they could find regardless of their lack of skills—they simplified work tasks and trained the workers, with the federal government paying all the costs. Millions of people changed their day-to-day activities – farmers left marginal operations, students quit school and housewives joined the labor force.

The policy was to insist on providing war supplies as soon as possible, regardless of cost and inefficiencies. Industry quickly absorbed the slack in the labor force and the tables turned such that employers needed to actively and aggressively recruit workers. As the military grew, new labor sources were needed to replace the 12 million men serving in the military. Propaganda campaigns started pleading for people to work in the war factories. The barriers for married women, the old, the unskilled—and (in the North and West) the barriers for racial minorities—were lowered.

=== Federal budget soars ===
In 1929, federal expenditures accounted for only 3% of GNP. Between 1933 and 1939, federal expenditures tripled. Spending on the war effort quickly eclipsed spending on New Deal programs. In 1944, government spending on the war effort exceeded 40% of GNP. These controls shared broad support among labor and business, resulting in cooperation between the two groups and the government. This cooperation resulted in the government subsidizing business and labor through both direct and indirect methods.

=== Wartime welfare projects ===
Conservative domination of Congress during the war meant that all welfare projects and reforms had to have their approval, which was given when business supported the project. For example, the Coal Mines Inspection and Investigation Act of 1941 significantly reduced fatality rates in the coal-mining industry, saving workers' lives and company money. In terms of welfare, the New Dealers wanted benefits for everyone according to need. However, conservatives proposed benefits based on national service—especially tied to military service or working in war industries—and their approach won out.

The Community Facilities Act of 1940 (the Lanham Act) provided federal funds to defense-impacted communities where the population had soared and local facilities were overwhelmed. It provided money for the building of segregated housing for war workers as well as recreational facilities, water, and sanitation plants, hospitals, day care centers, and schools.

The Servicemen's Dependents Allowance Act of 1942 provided family allowances for dependents of enlisted men. Emergency grants to states were authorized in 1942 for programs for day care for children of working mothers. In 1944, pensions were authorized for all physically or mentally helpless children of deceased veterans regardless of the age of the child at the date the claim was filed or at the time of the veteran's death, provided the child was disabled at the age of sixteen and that the disability continued to the date of the claim. The Public Health Service Act, which was passed that same year, expanded federal-state public health programs and increased the annual amount for grants for public health services.

The Emergency Maternity and Infant Care (EMIC) program, introduced in March 1943 by the Children's Bureau, provided free maternity care and medical treatment during an infant's first year for the wives and children of military personnel in the four lowest enlisted pay grades. One out of seven births was covered during its operation. EMIC paid $127 million to state health departments to cover the care of 1.2 million new mothers and their babies. The average cost of EMIC maternity cases completed was $92.49 for medical and hospital care. A striking effect was the sudden rapid decline in home births as most mothers now had paid hospital maternity care.

Under the 1943 Disabled Veterans Rehabilitation Act, vocational rehabilitation services were offered to wounded World War II veterans and some 621,000 veterans would go on to receive assistance under this program. The G.I. Bill (Servicemen's Readjustment Act of 1944) was a landmark piece of legislation, providing 16 million returning veterans with benefits such as housing, educational and unemployment assistance and played a major role in the postwar expansion of the American middle class.

=== Fair Employment Practices ===
In response to the March on Washington Movement led by A. Philip Randolph, Roosevelt promulgated Executive Order 8802 in June 1941, which established the President's Committee on Fair Employment Practices (FEPC) "to receive and investigate complaints of discrimination" so that "there shall be no discrimination in the employment of workers in defense industries or government because of race, creed, color, or national origin".

=== Growing equality of income ===
A major result of the full employment at high wages was a sharp, long-lasting decrease in the level of income inequality (Great Compression). The gap between rich and poor narrowed dramatically in the area of nutrition because food rationing and price controls provided a reasonably priced diet to everyone. White collar workers did not typically receive overtime and therefore the gap between white collar and blue collar income narrowed. Large families that had been poor during the 1930s had four or more wage earners and these families shot to the top one-third income bracket. Overtime provided large paychecks in war industries and average living standards rose steadily, with real wages rising by 44% in the four years of war, while the percentage of families with an annual income of less than $2,000 fell from 75% to 25% of the population.

In 1941, 40% of all American families lived on less than the $1,500 per year defined as necessary by the Works Progress Administration for a modest standard of living. The median income stood at $2,000 per year, and 8 million workers earned below the legal minimum. From 1939 to 1944, wages and salaries more than doubled, with overtime pay and the expansion of jobs leading to a 70% rise in average weekly earnings during the course of the war. Membership in organized labor increased by 50% between 1941 and 1945 and because the War Labor Board sought labor-management peace, new workers were encouraged to participate in the existing labor organizations, thereby receiving all the benefits of union membership such as improved working conditions, better fringe benefits, and higher wages. As noted by William H. Chafe, "with full employment, higher wages and social welfare benefits provided under government regulations, American workers experienced a level of well-being that, for many, had never occurred before". According to one study over 60% of Americans lived in poverty in 1933, and under 40% did so by 1945.

As a result of the new prosperity, consumer expenditures rose by nearly 50%, from $61.7 billion at the start of the war to $98.5 billion by 1944. Individual savings accounts climbed almost sevenfold during the course of the war. The share of total income held by the top 5% of wage earners fell from 22% to 17% while the bottom 40% increased their share of the economic pie. In addition, during the course of the war, the proportion of the American population earning less than $3,000 (in 1968 dollars) fell by half.

== Controls and taxes ==
Federal tax policy was highly contentious during the war, with President Franklin D. Roosevelt opposing a conservative coalition in Congress. However, both sides agreed on the need for high taxes (along with heavy borrowing) to pay for the war: top marginal tax rates ranged from 81% to 94% for the duration of the war, and the income level subject to the highest rate was lowered from $5,000,000 to $200,000. Roosevelt tried unsuccessfully, by executive order 9250, to impose a 100% surtax on after-tax incomes over $25,000 (equal to roughly $465,144 today). However, Roosevelt did manage to impose this cap on executive pay in corporations with government contracts. Congress also enlarged the tax base by lowering the minimum income to pay taxes, and by reducing personal exemptions and deductions. By 1944 nearly every employed person was paying federal income taxes (compared to 10% in 1940).

Many controls were put on the economy. The most important was price controls, imposed on most products and monitored by the Office of Price Administration. Wages were also controlled. Corporations dealt with numerous agencies, especially the War Production Board (WPB), and the War and Navy departments, which had the purchasing power and priorities that largely reshaped and expanded industrial production.

=== Rationing ===
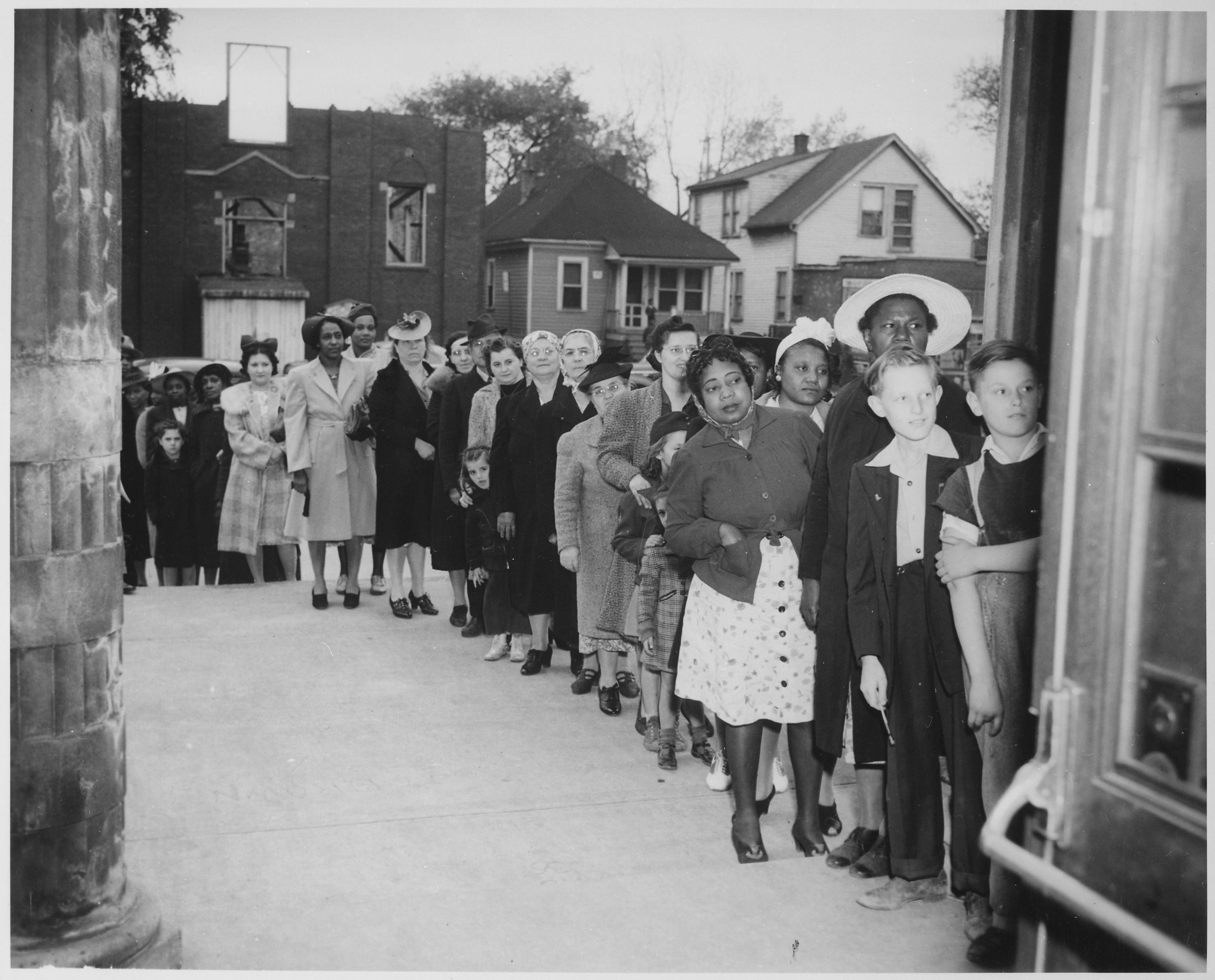
Sugar rationing

In 1942 a rationing system was begun to guarantee minimum amounts of necessities to everyone (especially poor people) and prevent inflation. Tires were the first item to be rationed in January 1942 because supplies of natural rubber were interrupted. Gasoline rationing proved an even better way to allocate scarce rubber. In June 1942 the Combined Food Board was set up to coordinate the worldwide supply of food to the Allies, with special attention to flows from the US and Canada to Britain. By 1943, government-issued ration coupons were required to purchase coffee, sugar, meat, cheese, butter, lard, margarine, canned foods, dried fruits, jam, gasoline, bicycles, fuel oil, clothing, silk or nylon stockings, shoes, and many other items. Some items, such as automobiles and home appliances, were no longer made. The rationing system did not apply to used goods such as clothes or cars, but they became more expensive since they were not subject to price controls.

To get a classification and a book of rationing stamps, people had to appear before a local rationing board. Each person in a household received a ration book, including babies and children. When purchasing gasoline, a driver had to present a gas card along with a ration book and cash. Ration stamps were valid only for a set period to forestall hoarding. All forms of automobile racing were banned, including the Indianapolis 500 which was canceled from 1942 to 1945. Sightseeing driving was banned.

== Personal savings ==
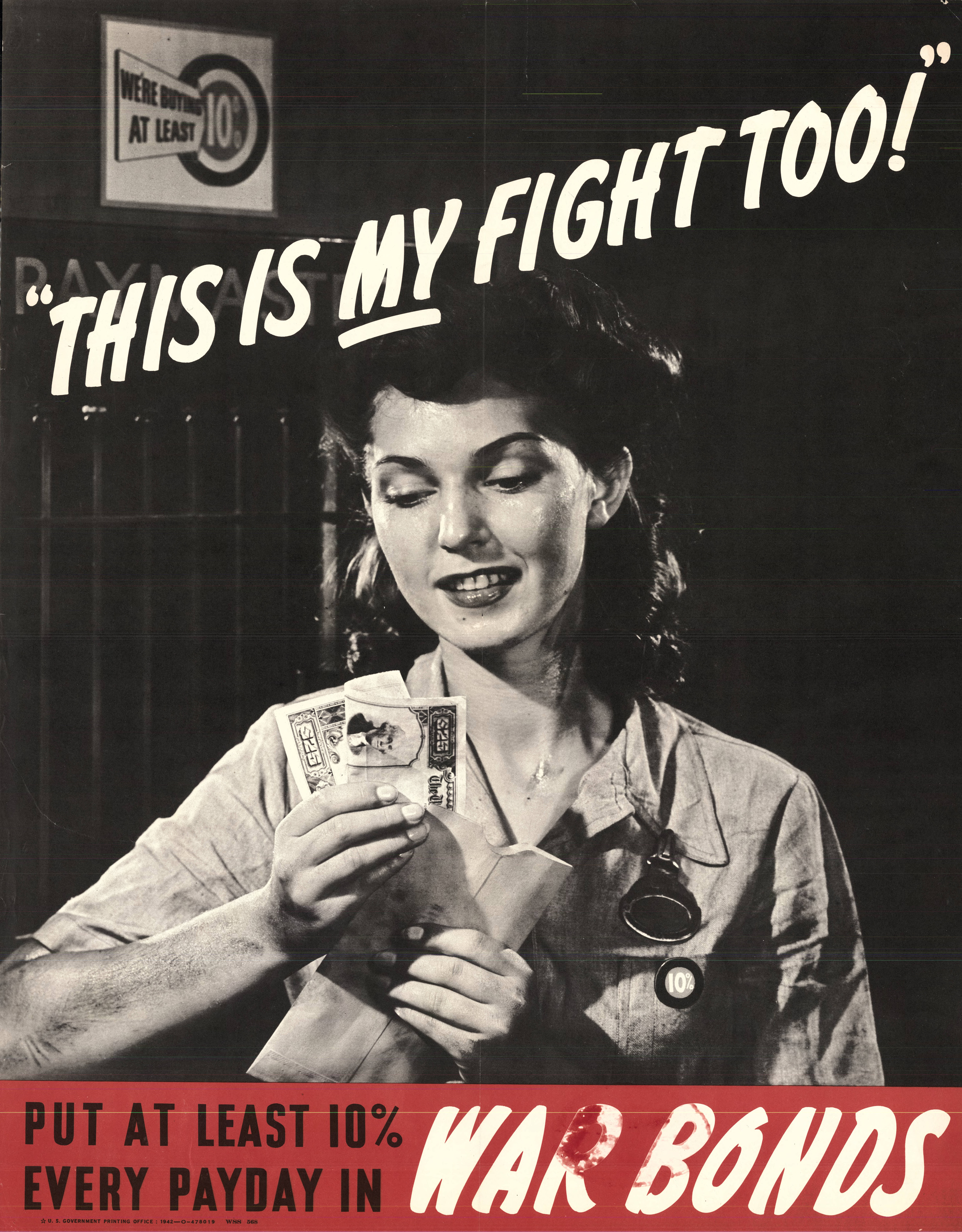
"This is My Fight Too!" war bond poster, 1942. Hennepin County Library collection.

Personal income was at an all-time high, and more dollars were chasing fewer goods to purchase. On the eve of Pearl Harbor, advertising trade journals overflowed with evidence of a siege mentality. One warned that "advertising is threatened today as it has never been threatened before." Another concluded that "all of American industry is in a mental state like anticipating a trip to the dentist. This was a recipe for economic disaster that was largely avoided because Americans—persuaded daily by their government to do so—were also saving money at an all-time high rate, mostly in War Bonds but also in private savings accounts and insurance policies. Per capita war spending was less concentrated than total spending as the ratio of the standard deviation to the mean was 3.6 compared to 6.5 for total spending.

Consumer saving was strongly encouraged through investment in war bonds that would mature after the war. Most workers had an automatic payroll deduction; children collected savings stamps until they had enough to buy a bond. Bond rallies were held throughout the US with celebrities, usually Hollywood film stars, to enhance the bond advertising effectiveness. Several stars were responsible for personal appearance tours that netted multiple millions of dollars in bond pledges—an astonishing amount in 1943. The public paid ¾ of the face value of a war bond and received the full face value back after a set number of years. This shifted their consumption from the war to postwar and allowed over 40% of GDP to go to military spending, with moderate inflation.

With the mobilization of the US economy for war, an unprecedented demand for new workers arose. In response to this need, some 6.5 million women entered the work force. Additionally, with the personal spending of many Americans, the necessity of facilities and spending by the government depended on specific counties and what they had to offer for the war effort. One of these particular groups that helped with specific parts of the war effort were comic book readers. Readers could assist the heroes by solving puzzles, buying American made goods, and recycling to aid the war effort. With relief, Americans celebrated restaffed factories and restuffed wallets for the first time in years. Those favorable conditions in turn produced others: booming demand for consumer products, record-breaking retail sales, and the creation of even more jobs to manufacture and to sell long coveted goods.

Americans were challenged to put "at least 10% of every paycheck into Bonds". Compliance was very high, with entire factories of workers earning a special "Minuteman" flag to fly over their plant if over 90% workers belonged to the "Ten Percent Club". Real GNP advanced 40 percent between 1941 and 1945, which represents an average annual growth rate of 8.4 percent. There were seven major War Loan drives, all of which exceeded their goals.

== Labor ==
The unemployment problems of the Great Depression largely ended with the mobilization for war. Out of a labor force of 54 million, unemployment fell by half from 7.7 million in spring 1940 (when the first accurate statistics were compiled) to 3.4 million by fall of 1941 and fell by half again to 1.5 million by fall of 1942, hitting an all-time low of 700,000 in fall 1944. There was a growing labor shortage in war centers, with sound trucks going street by street begging for people to apply for war jobs.

Greater wartime production created millions of new jobs, while the draft reduced the number of young men available for civilian jobs. So great was the demand for labor that millions of retired people, housewives, and students entered the labor force, lured by patriotism and wages. The shortage of grocery clerks caused retailers to convert from service at the counter to self-service. With new shorter women clerks replacing taller men, some stores lowered shelves to 5 feet 8 inches (1.73 m). Before the war, most groceries, dry cleaners, drugstores, and department stores offered home delivery service. The labor shortage and gasoline and tire rationing caused most retailers to stop delivery. They found that requiring customers to buy their products in person increased sales.

=== Women ===
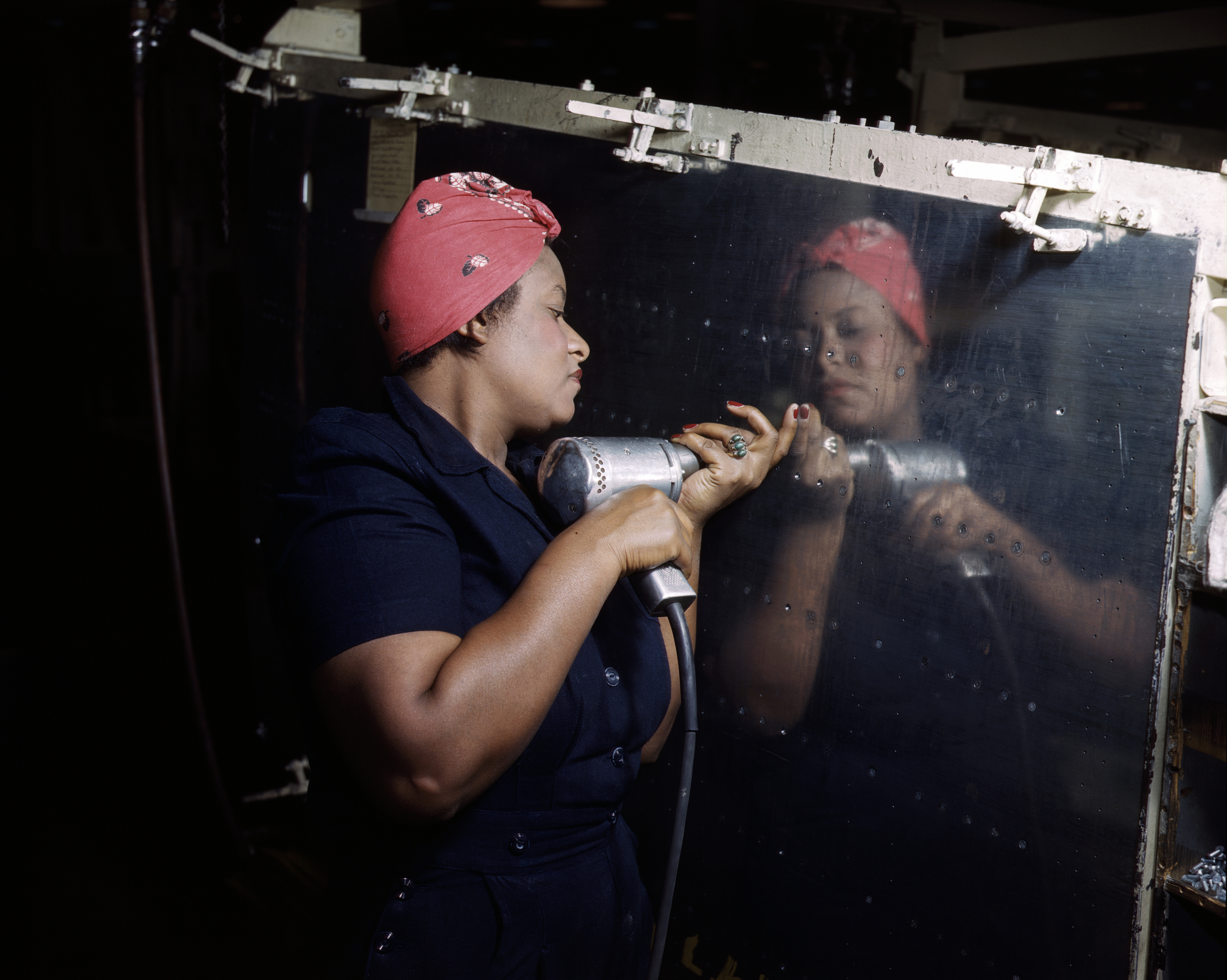
"Rosie the Riveter", working on an A-31 "Vengeance" dive bomber, Tennessee, 1943.

Women also joined the workforce to replace men who had joined the forces, though in fewer numbers. From 1890 to 1990, the percentage of married women in the workforce rose from 5% to 60%. Most of this change in workforce participation was during World War II. Roosevelt stated that the efforts of civilians at home to support the war through personal sacrifice was as critical to winning the war as the efforts of the soldiers themselves. "Rosie the Riveter" became the symbol of women laboring in manufacturing. Women worked in defense plants and volunteered for war-related organizations. Women even learned to fix cars and became "conductorettes" for the train. The war effort brought about significant changes in the role of women in society as a whole. During the duration of the war, women had access to job opportunities beyond the traditionally “pink-collar” jobs. These jobs were often previously filled exclusively by men, and were higher paying and typically required more skill. Afterwards, there was a reversion to traditional gender roles and an expectation for women to become housewives, or at least take on more traditionally female jobs.

Alice Throckmorton McLean founded the American Women's Voluntary Services (AWVS) in January 1940, 23 months before the United States entered the war. When Pearl Harbor was bombed, the AWVS had more than 18,000 members who were ready to drive ambulances, fight fires, lead evacuations, operate mobile kitchens, deliver first aid, and perform other emergency services. By war's end the AWVS counted 325,000 women at work and selling an estimated $1 billion in war bonds and stamps.

At the end of the war, most of the munitions-making jobs ended. Many factories were closed; others retooled for civilian production. In some jobs, women were replaced by returning veterans who did not lose seniority because they were in service. However, the number of women at work in 1946 was 87% of the number in 1944, leaving 13% who lost or quit their jobs. Many women working in machinery factories and more were taken out of the workforce. Many of these former factory workers found other work at kitchens, being teachers, etc.

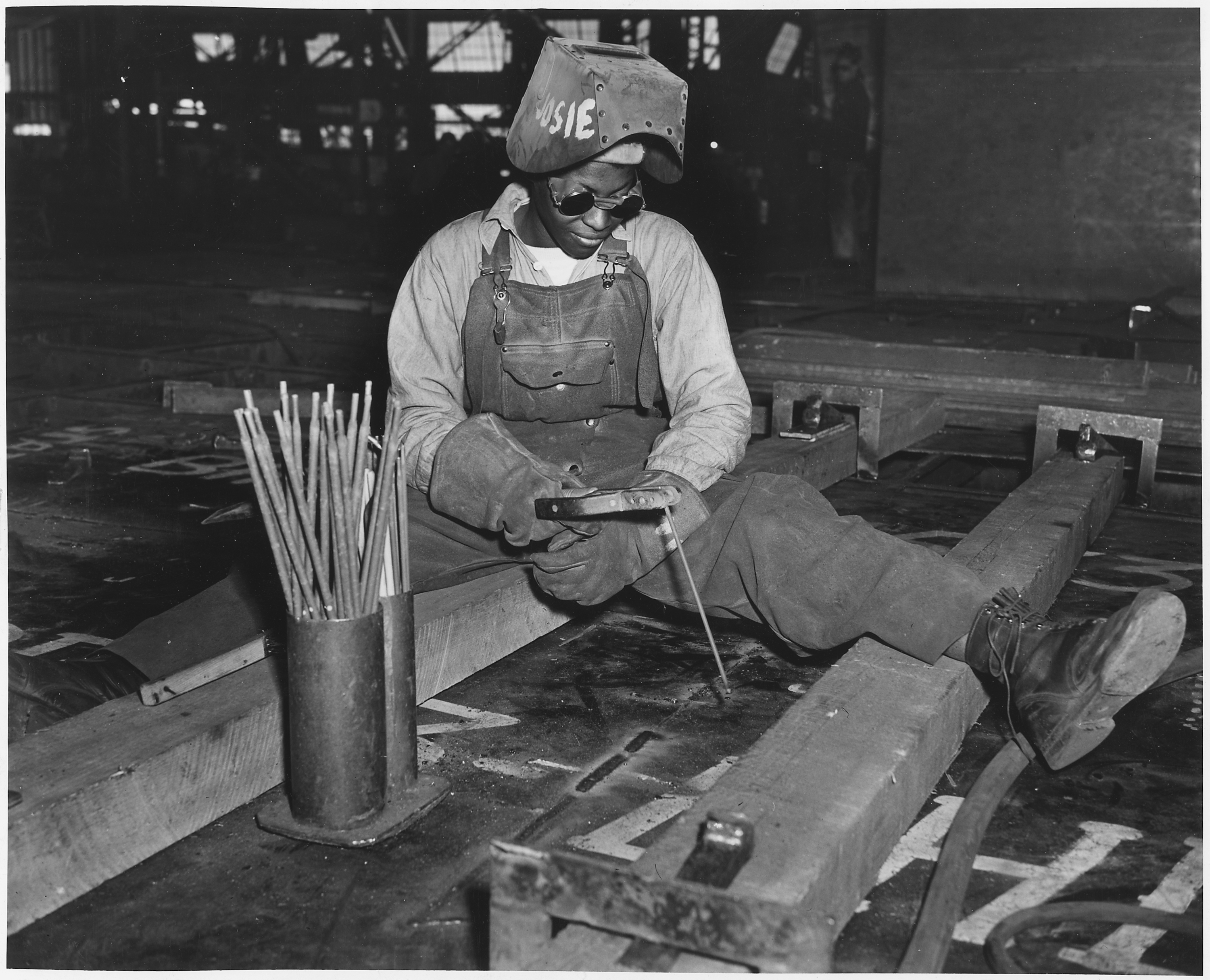
A female welder helping construct the SS George Washington Carver at the Kaiser Shipyards in Richmond, California, April 1943.

The table shows the development of the United States labor force by sex during the war years.

Year	Total labor force (*1000)	of which Male (*1000)	of which Female (*1000)	Female share of total (%)
1940	56,100	41,940	14,160	25.2
1941	57,720	43,070	14,650	25.4
1942	60,330	44,200	16,120	26.7
1943	64,780	45,950	18,830	29.1
1944	66,320	46,930	19,390	29.2
1945	66,210	46,910	19,304	29.2
1946	60,520	43,690	16,840	27.8

Women also took on new roles in sport and entertainment, which opened to them as more and more men were drafted. The All-American Girls Professional Baseball League was the creation of Chicago Cubs owner Philip Wrigley, who sought alternative ways to expand his baseball franchise as top male players left for military service. In 1943, he created an eight-team league in small industrial cities around the Great Lakes. Night games offered affordable, patriotic entertainment to working Americans who had flocked to wartime jobs in the Midwest hubs of Chicago and Detroit. The league provided a novel entertainment of women playing baseball well while wearing short, feminine uniform skirts. Players as young as fifteen were recruited from white farm families and urban industrial teams. Fans supported the League to the extent that it continued well past the conclusion of the war, lasting through 1953.

=== Farming ===
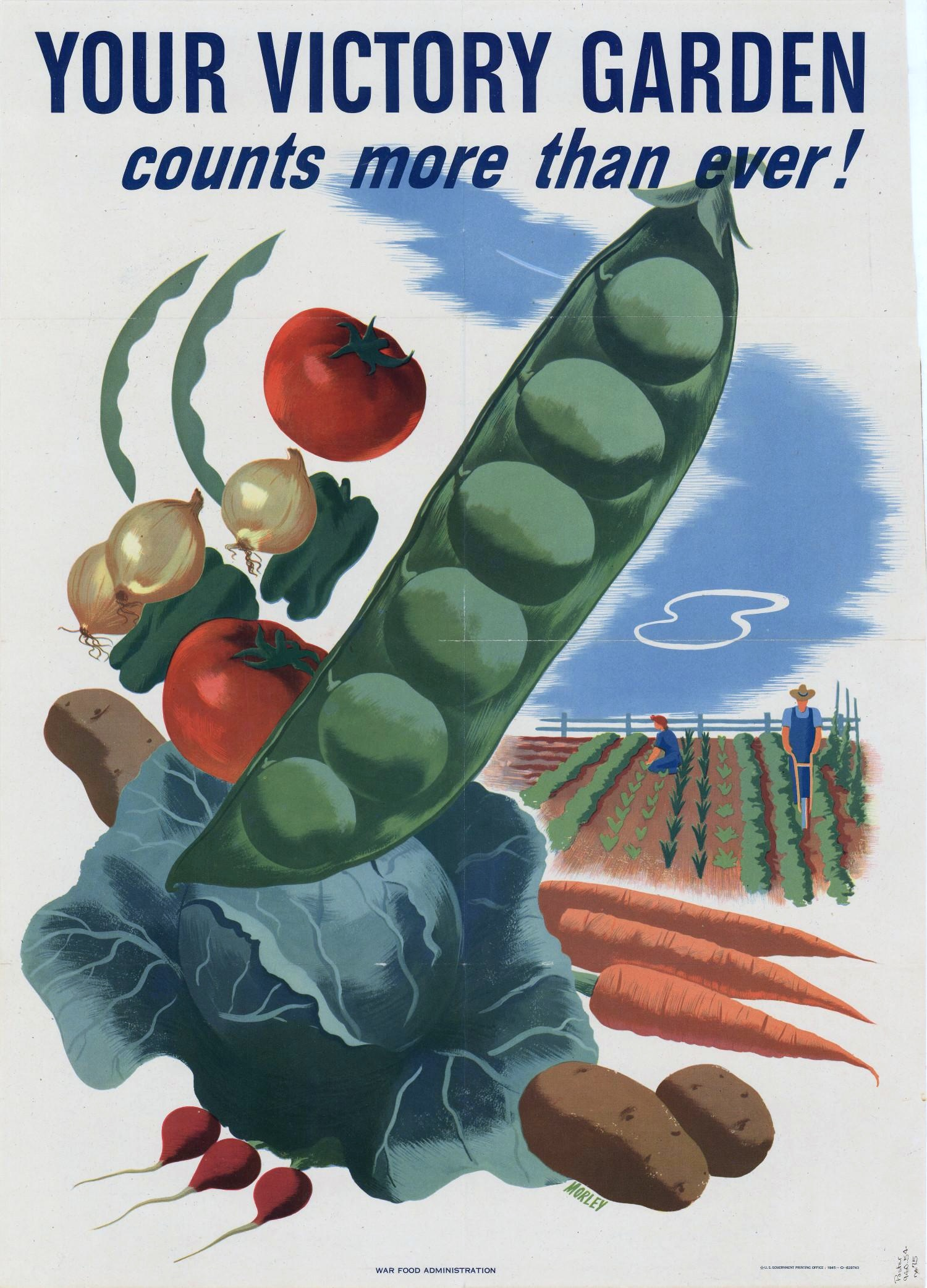
Victory garden poster

Labor shortages were felt in agriculture, even though most farmers were given an exemption and few were drafted. Large numbers volunteered or moved to cities for factory jobs. At the same time, many agricultural commodities were in greater demand by the military and for the civilian populations of Allies. Production was encouraged and prices and markets were under tight federal control. Between December 1941 and December 1942 it was estimated 1.6 million men & women left agricultural work for military service or to get higher paying jobs in war industries. Civilians were encouraged to create "victory gardens", farms that were often started in backyards and lots. Children were encouraged to help with these farms, too.

The Bracero Program, a bi-national labor agreement between Mexico and the US, started in 1942. Some 290,000 braceros ("strong arm", in Spanish) were recruited and contracted to work in the agriculture fields. Half went to Texas, and 20% to the Pacific Northwest.

Between 1942 and 1946 some 425,000 Italian and German prisoners of war were used as farm laborers, loggers, and cannery workers. In Michigan, for example, the POWs accounted for more than one-third of the state's agricultural production and food processing in 1944.

=== Children ===
To help with the need for a larger source of food, the nation looked to school-aged children to help on farms. Schools often had a victory garden in vacant parking lots and on roofs and children worked on these to help with the war effort. The slogan, "Grow your own, can your own", also influenced children to help at home.

The Emergency Maternity and Infant Care (EMIC) program was a federally funded government initiative (1943–1949) that provided free maternity and pediatric healthcare to 1.2 million wives (and their new babies) of enlisted military personnel in the four lowest pay grades. The government also provided monthly cash allowances to wives and children whose husbands were in the armed forces.

=== Teenagers ===
With the war's ever-increasing need for able-bodied men consuming America's labor force in the early 1940s, industry turned to teen-aged boys and girls to fill in as replacements. Consequently, many states had to change their child-labor laws to allow these teenagers to work. The lures of patriotism, adulthood, and money led many youths to drop out of school and take a defense job. Between 1940 and 1944, the number of teenage workers tripled from 870,000 in 1940 to 2.8 million in 1944, while the number of students in public high schools dropped from 6.6 million in 1940 to 5.6 million in 1944, about a million students—and many teachers—took jobs. Policymakers did not want high school students to drop out and government agencies, parents, school administrations and employers cooperated in local "Go-to-School Drives" to encourage high school students to stay, whether that be part- or full-time.

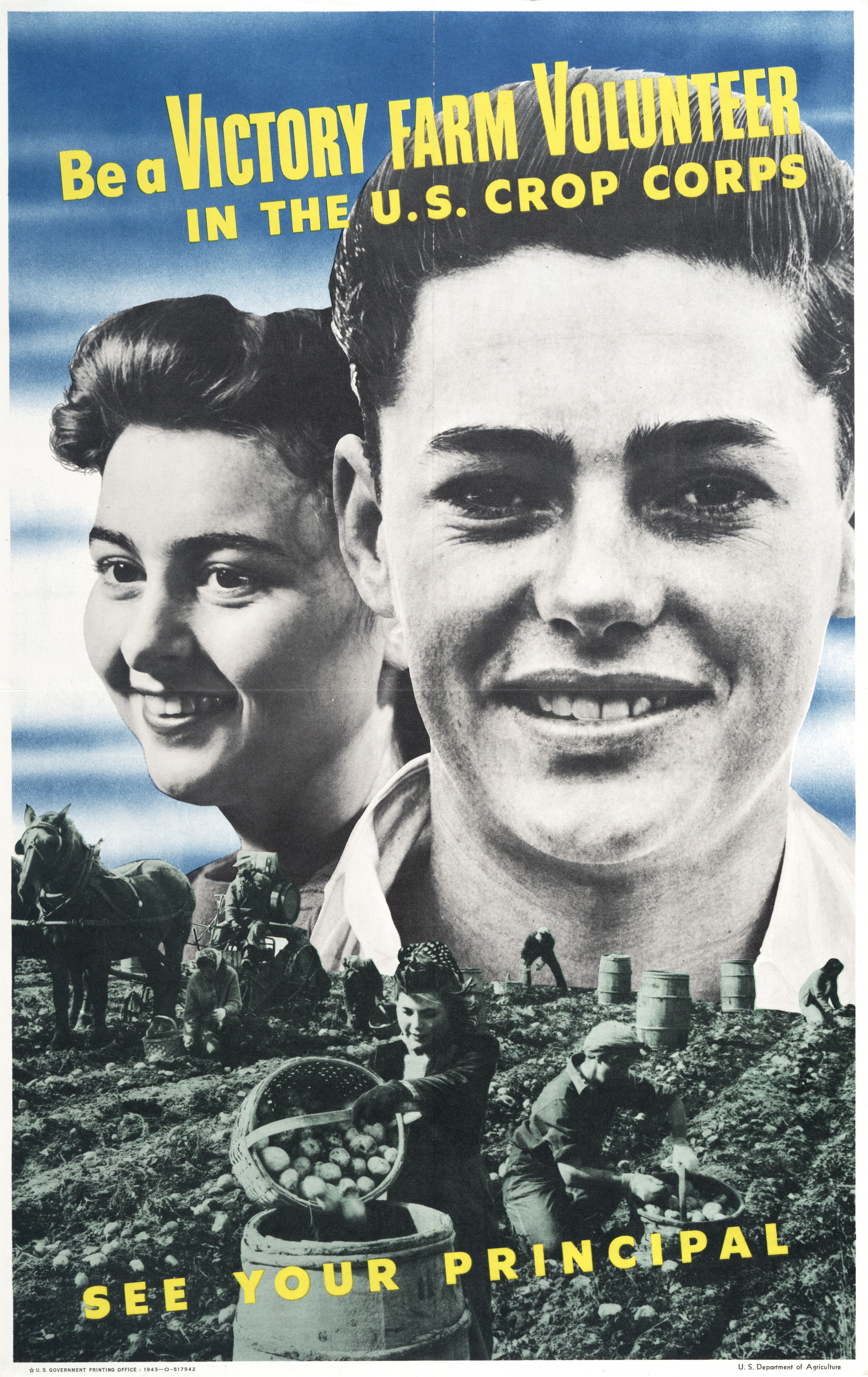
Recruitment poster for the Victory Farm Volunteers, 1943

The Victory Farm Volunteers under the US Crop Corps accepted teenagers aged 14–18 to work in agricultural jobs. However some states did lower their age limit, with one allowing nine-years-olds. At the program's peak in 1944 there were 903,794 volunteers, which made it larger than the Woman's Land Army of America and the numbers of foreign migrant workers and prisoners of war who were laborers. These volunteers were mainly from the cities and urban areas. Volunteers mostly worked for three months in the summer and for a fourth if high schools decided to push back the starting date of the academic year. To join, a volunteer needed the consent of their parent(s)/guardian(s). There were three types of work environments for the volunteers. The most common (80% of volunteers) involved them being transported to a worksite daily via buses or farming trucks and returning home at night. Another program involved volunteers living with farming families and working alongside them, with about 20% doing this. There were also camps set up although these were not very common, only 4% of all VFV volunteers lived in camps between 1943 and 1945.

=== Labor unions ===
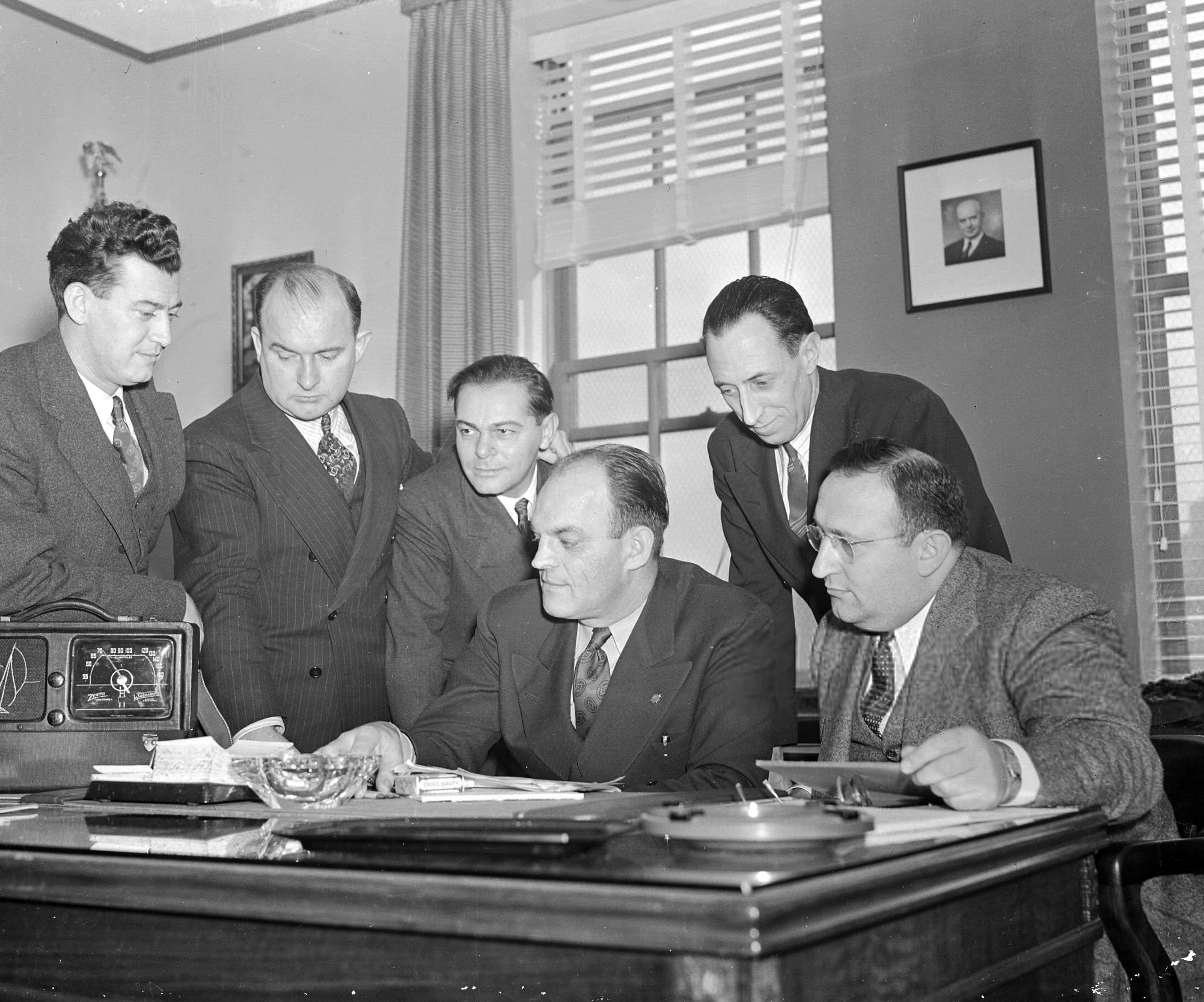
CIO leaders listen to President Roosevelt's Day of Infamy speech before pledging support to the war effort, December 12, 1941 Left to right: Austin Hogan, TWU; Michael Quill, TWU; Ben Gold, IFLWU; Joseph Curran, NMU; Harry Bridges, ILWU, Morris Muster, UFWA

The war mobilization changed the relationship of the Congress of Industrial Organizations (CIO) with both employers and the national government. Both the CIO and the larger American Federation of Labor (AFL) grew rapidly in the war years.

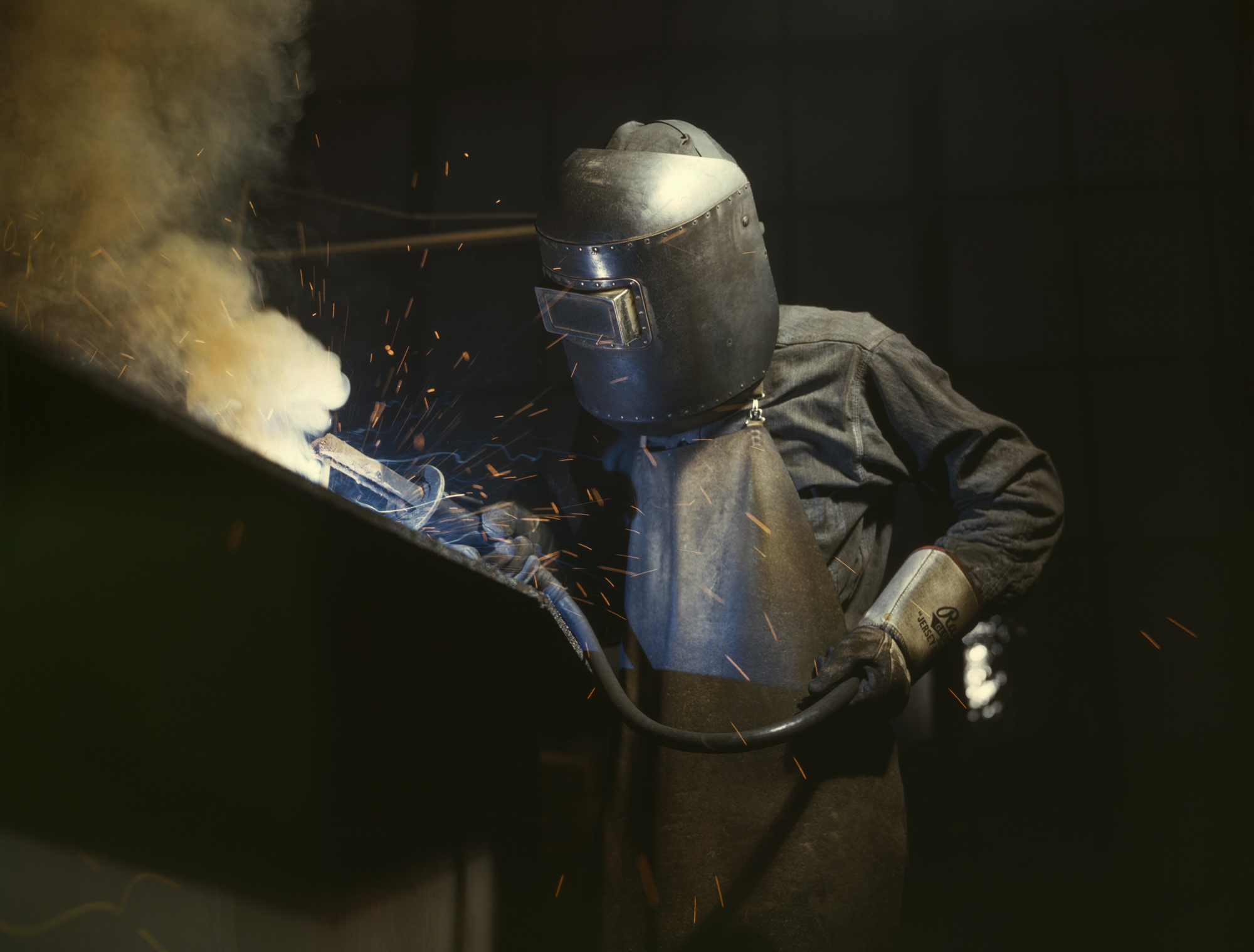
Welder making boilers for a ship, Combustion Engineering Co., Chattanooga, Tennessee. June 1942.

Nearly all the unions that belonged to the CIO were fully supportive of both the war effort and of the Roosevelt administration. However, the United Mine Workers, who had taken an isolationist stand in the years leading up to the war and had opposed Roosevelt's reelection in 1940, left the CIO in 1942. The major unions supported a wartime no-strike pledge that aimed to eliminate not only major strikes for new contracts but also the innumerable small strikes called by shop stewards and local union leadership to protest particular grievances. In return for labor's no-strike pledge, the government offered arbitration to determine the wages and other terms of new contracts. Those procedures produced modest wage increases during the first few years of the war but not enough to keep up with inflation, particularly when combined with the slowness of the arbitration machinery.

Even though the complaints from union members about the no-strike pledge became louder and more bitter, the CIO did not abandon it. The Mine Workers, by contrast, who did not belong to either the AFL or the CIO for much of the war, threatened numerous strikes including a successful twelve-day strike in 1943. The strikes and threats made mine leader John L. Lewis a much-hated man and led to legislation hostile to unions.

All the major unions grew stronger during the war. The government put pressure on employers to recognize unions to avoid the sort of turbulent struggles over union recognition of the 1930s, while unions were generally able to obtain maintenance of membership clauses, a form of union security, through arbitration and negotiation. Employers gave workers new untaxed benefits (such as vacation time, pensions, and health insurance), which increased real incomes even when wage rates were frozen. The wage differential between higher-skilled and less-skilled workers narrowed, and with the enormous increase in overtime for blue-collar wage workers (at time and a half pay), incomes in working-class households shot up, while the salaried middle class lost ground.

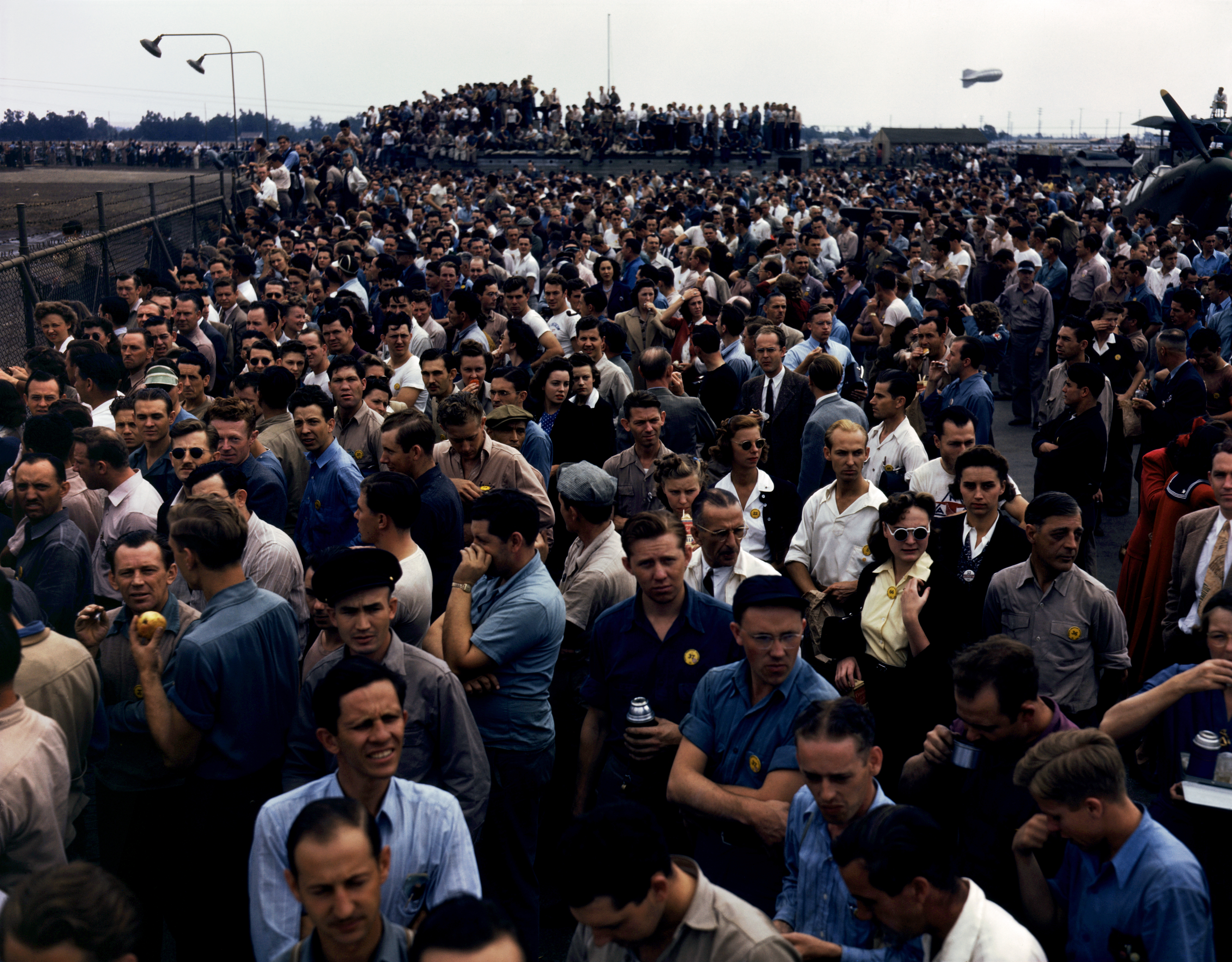
Male and female workers gather at Consolidated Aircraft, Fort Worth, Texas, 1942. Note an early North American P-51 Mustang fighter parked with its canopy open among the crowd at upper right and the barrage balloon in the upper right background

The experience of bargaining on a national basis, while restraining local unions from striking, also tended to accelerate the trend toward bureaucracy within the larger CIO unions. Some, such as the Steelworkers, had always been centralized organizations in which authority for major decisions resided at the top. The United Auto Workers (UAW), by contrast, had always been a more grassroots organization, but it also started to try to rein in its maverick local leadership during these years.

The CIO also had to confront deep racial divides in its membership, particularly in the UAW plants in Detroit where white workers sometimes struck to protest the promotion of black workers to production jobs; but also in shipyards in Alabama, mass transit in Philadelphia, and steel plants in Baltimore. The CIO leadership, particularly those in further left unions such as the Packinghouse Workers, the UAW, the NMU, and the Transport Workers, undertook serious efforts to suppress hate strikes, to educate their membership, and to support the Roosevelt Administration's tentative efforts to remedy racial discrimination in war industries through the Fair Employment Practice Committee. Those unions contrasted their relatively bold attack on the problem with the AFL.

The CIO unions were progressive in dealing with gender discrimination in the wartime industry, which now employed many more women workers in nontraditional jobs. Unions that had represented large numbers of women workers before the war, such as the United Electrical, Radio and Machine Workers of America (electrical equipment factory workers) and the Food and Tobacco Workers, had fairly good records of fighting discrimination against women. Most union leaders saw women as temporary wartime replacements for the men in the armed forces. The wages of these women needed to be kept high so that the veterans would get high wages.

== The South in wartime ==
The war marked a time of dramatic change in the poor, heavily rural South as new industries and military bases were developed by the Federal government, providing badly needed capital and infrastructure in many regions. People from all parts of the US came to the South for military training and work in the region's many bases and new industries. During and after the war millions of hard-scrabble farmers, both white and black, left agriculture for urban jobs.

The United States began mobilizing for war in a major way in the spring of 1940. The warm sunny weather of the South proved ideal for building 60 percent of the Army's new training camps and nearly half the new airfields, In all 40 percent of spending on new military installations went to the South. For example, sleepy Starke, Florida, a town of 1,500 people in 1940, became the base of Camp Blanding. By March 1941, 20,000 men were constructing a permanent camp for 60,000 soldiers. Money flowed freely for the war effort, as over $4 billion went into military facilities in the South, and another $5 billion into defense plants. Major shipyards were built in Virginia, North Carolina, South Carolina, and along the Gulf Coast. Huge warplane plants were opened in Dallas-Fort Worth and Atlanta. The most secret and expensive operation was at Oak Ridge, Tennessee, where vast amounts of locally generated Tennessee Valley Authority electricity were used to prepare uranium for the atom bomb.

The number of production workers doubled during the war. Most training centers, factories and shipyards were closed in 1945 and the families that left hardscrabble farms often remained to find jobs in the urban South. The region had finally reached the take off stage into industrial and commercial growth, although its income and wage levels lagged well behind the national average. Nevertheless, as George B. Tindall notes, the transformation was, "The demonstration of industrial potential, new habits of mind, and a recognition that industrialization demanded community services."

The North Carolina Shipbuilding Company was launched in response to the United States Maritime Commission’s decision to open a series of shipyards along the coasts. The South was favored because its economy needed stimulation and it had a large underutilized rural labor force. The opening of the shipyard in 1941, a subsidiary of a Virginia company, transformed Wilmington, North Carolina into the "Defense Capital of the State". By the time it closed in 1946 it had launched 243 cargo ships, including 126 Liberty ships and 117 of the larger Victory vessels. They proved critical for transporting munitions to Europe and the Pacific. The yard employed upwards of 21,000 workers, including 1,600 women and 6,000 Blacks. The impact was to swell the local population from 33,000 to 50,000.

== Civilian support for war effort ==
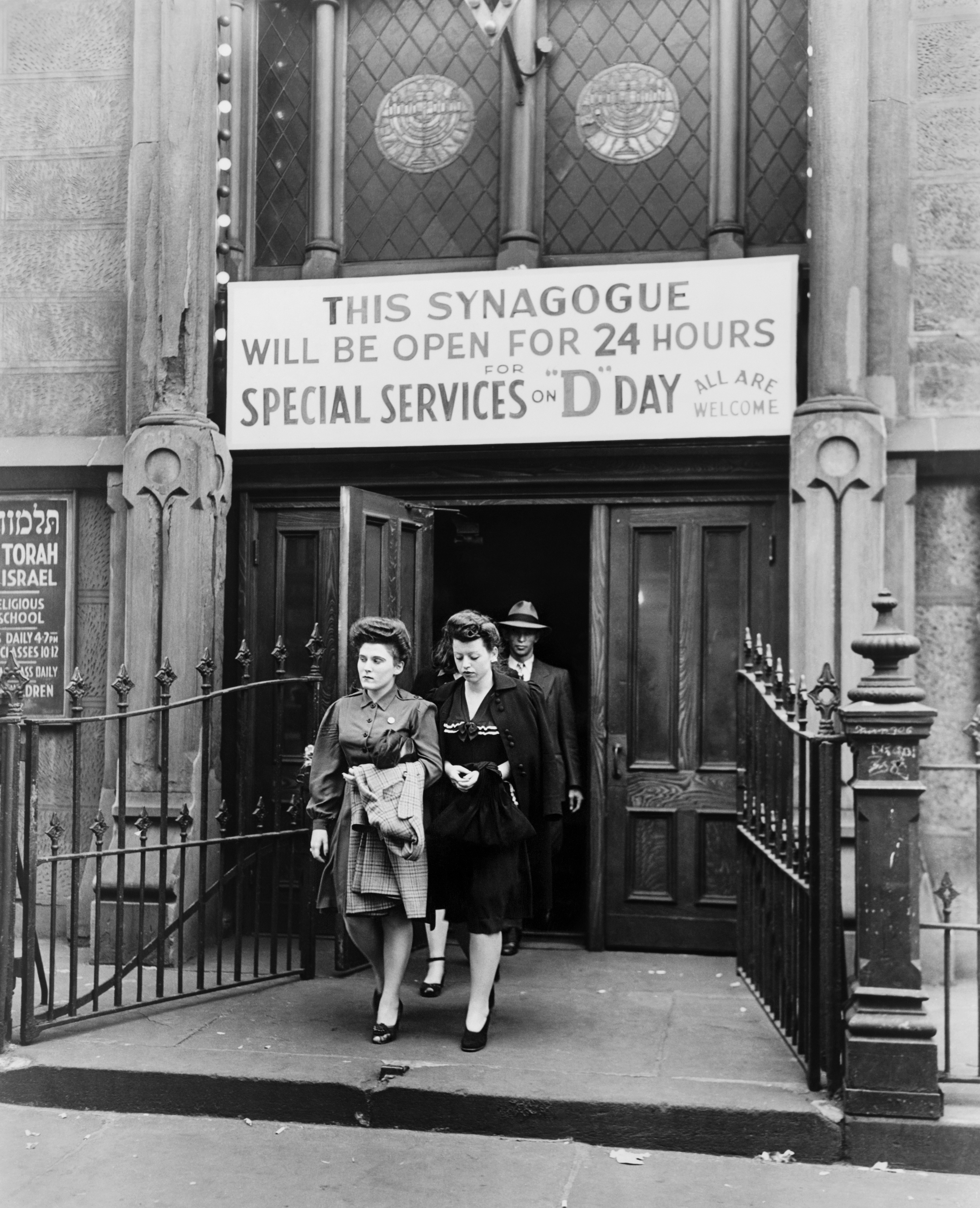
Synagogue Emunath Israel in New York City remained open 24 hours on D-Day (June 6, 1944) for special services and prayer.

Early in the war, it became apparent that German U-boats were using the backlighting of coastal cities in the Eastern Seaboard and the South to destroy ships exiting harbors. It became the first duty of civilians recruited for the local civilian defense to ensure that lights were either off or thick curtains drawn over all windows at night.

State Guards were reformed for internal security duties to replace the National Guardsmen who were federalized and sent overseas. The Civil Air Patrol was established, which enrolled civilian spotters in air reconnaissance, search-and-rescue, and transport. Its Coast Guard counterpart, the Coast Guard Auxiliary, used civilian boats and crews in similar rescue roles. Towers were built in coastal and border towns, and spotters were trained to recognize enemy aircraft. Blackouts were practiced in every city, even those far from the coast. All exterior lighting had to be extinguished, and black-out curtains placed over windows. The main purpose was to remind people that there was a war on and to provide activities that would engage the civil spirit of millions of people not otherwise involved in the war effort. In large part, this effort was successful, sometimes almost to a fault, such as the Plains states where many dedicated aircraft spotters took up their posts night after night watching the skies in an area of the country that no enemy aircraft of that time could hope to reach.

The United Service Organizations (USO) was founded in 1941 in response to a request from President Franklin D. Roosevelt to provide morale and recreation services to uniformed military personnel. The USO brought together six civilian agencies: the Salvation Army, YMCA, Young Women's Christian Association, National Catholic Community Service, National Travelers Aid Association, and the National Jewish Welfare Board.

Women volunteered to work for the Red Cross, the USO, and other agencies. Other women previously employed only in the home, or in traditionally female work, took jobs in factories that directly supported the war effort or filled jobs vacated by men who had entered military service. Enrollment in high schools and colleges plunged as many high school and college students dropped out to take war jobs.

Various items, previously discarded, were saved after use for what was called "recycling" years later. Families were requested to save fat drippings from cooking for use in soap making. Neighborhood "scrap drives" collected scrap copper and brass for use in artillery shells. Milkweed was harvested by children ostensibly for lifejackets.

=== Draft ===
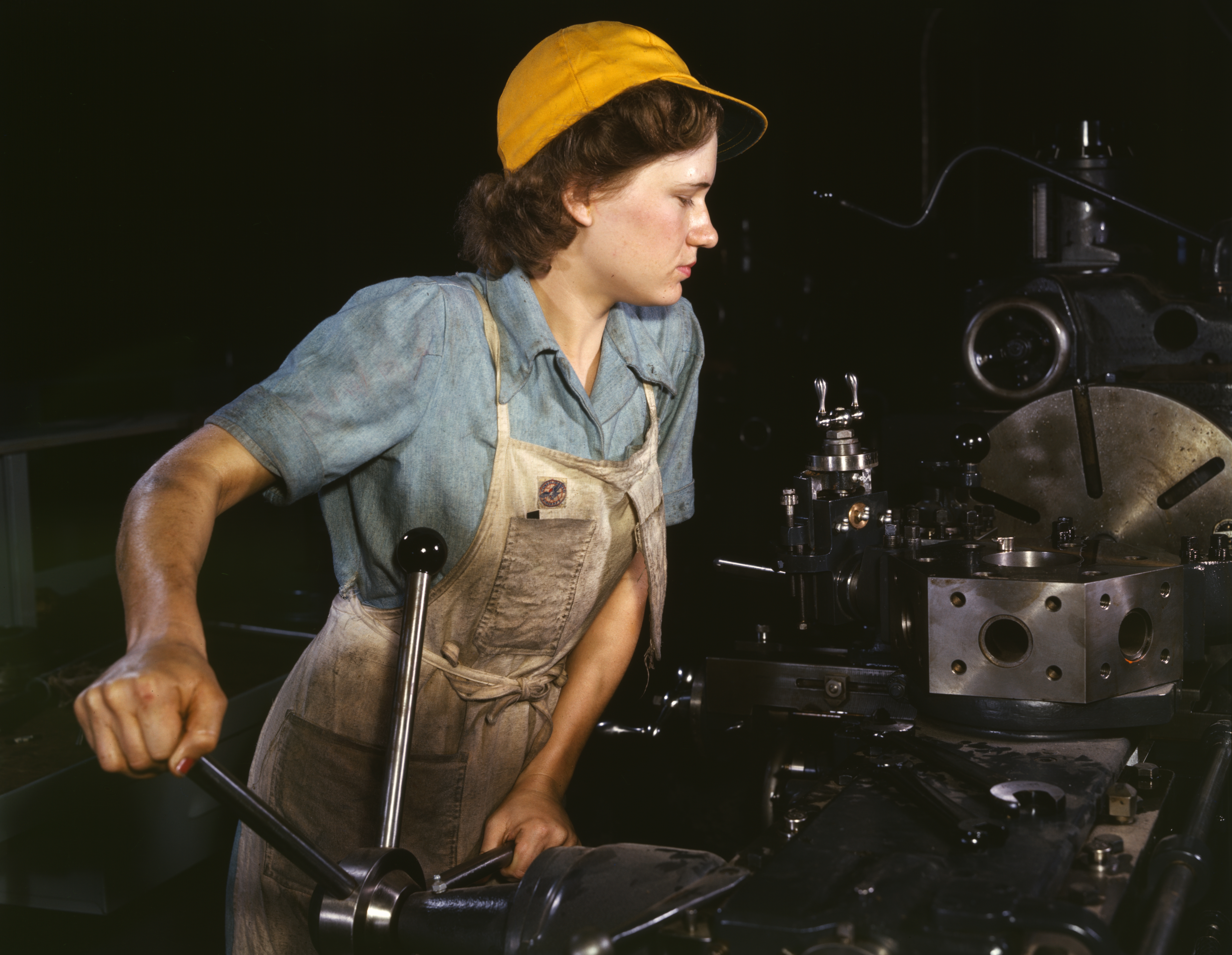
A female factory worker in 1942, Fort Worth, Texas. Women entered the workforce because men were drafted into the armed forces.

In 1940, Congress passed the first peace-time draft legislation. It was renewed (by one vote) in summer 1941. It involved questions as to who should control the draft, the size of the army, and the need for deferments. The system worked through local draft boards comprising community leaders who were given quotas and then decided how to fill them. There was very little draft resistance.

The nation went from a surplus manpower pool with high unemployment and relief in 1940 to a severe manpower shortage by 1943. Industry leaders realized that the Army urgently desired production of essential war materials and foodstuffs more than soldiers. (Large numbers of soldiers were not used until the invasion of Europe in summer 1944.) In 1940–43 the Army often transferred soldiers to civilian status in the Enlisted Reserve Corps to increase production. Those transferred returned to work in essential industry, although they could be recalled to active duty if the Army needed them. Others were discharged if their civilian work was deemed essential. There were instances of mass releases of men to increase production in various industries. Working men who had been classified 4F or otherwise ineligible for the draft took second jobs.

In the table below is an overview of the development of the United States labor force, the armed forces and unemployment during the war years.

Year	Total labor force (*1000)	Armed forces (*1000)	Unemployed (*1000)	Unemployment rate (%)
1939	55,588	370	9,480	17.2
1940	56,180	540	8,120	14.6
1941	57,530	1,620	5,560	9.9
1942	60,380	3,970	2,660	4.7
1943	64,560	9,020	1,070	1.9
1944	66,040	11,410	670	1.2
1945	65,290	11,430	1,040	1.9
1946	60,970	3,450	2,270	3.9

One contentious issue involved the drafting of fathers, which was avoided as much as possible. The drafting of 18-year-olds was desired by the military but vetoed by public opinion. Racial minorities were drafted at the same rate as Whites and were paid the same. The experience of World War I regarding men needed by industry was particularly unsatisfactory—too many skilled mechanics and engineers became privates (there is a possibly apocryphal story of a banker assigned as a baker due to a clerical error, noted by historian Lee Kennett in his book G.I.). Farmers demanded and were generally given occupational deferments; many volunteered anyway, but those who stayed at home lost postwar veterans benefits.

Later in the war, in light of the tremendous amount of manpower that would be necessary for the invasion of France in 1944, many earlier deferment categories became draft eligible.

=== Religion ===
After Pearl Harbor in December 1941, practically all the religious denominations gave some support to the war effort, such as providing chaplains. Typically, church members sent their sons into the military without protest, accepted shortages and rationing as a war necessity, purchased war bonds, working munitions industries, and prayed intensely for safe return and for victory. Church leaders, however, were much more cautious while holding fast to the ideals of peace, justice and humanitarianism, and sometimes criticizing military policies such as the bombing of enemy cities. They sponsored 10,000 military chaplains, and set up special ministries in and around military bases, focused not only on soldiers but their young wives who often followed them. The mainstream Protestant churches supported the "Double V" campaign of the black churches to achieve victory against the enemies abroad, and victory against racism on the home front. However, there was little religious protest against the incarceration of Japanese on the West Coast or against segregation of Blacks in the services. The intense moral outrage regarding the Holocaust largely appeared after the war ended, especially after 1960. Many church leaders supported studies of postwar peace proposals, typified by John Foster Dulles, a leading Protestant layman and a leading adviser to top-level Republicans. The churches promoted strong support for European relief programs, especially through the United Nations.

=== Pacifism ===
The pacifist churches such as the Quakers and Mennonites were small but maintained their opposition to military service, though many young members, such as Richard Nixon voluntarily joined the military. Unlike in 1917–1918, the positions were generally respected by the government, which set up non-combat civilian roles for conscientious objectors. The Church of God had a strong pacifist element reaching a high point in the late 1930s. This small Fundamentalist Protestant denomination in Indiana regarded World War II as a just war because America was attacked. Likewise, the Quakers generally regarded World War II as a just war and about 90% served, although there were some conscientious objectors. The Mennonites and Brethren continued their pacifism, but the federal government was much less hostile than in the previous war. These churches helped their young men to both become conscientious objectors and to provide valuable service to the nation. Goshen College set up a training program for unpaid Civilian Public Service jobs. Although young women pacifists were not eligible for the draft, they volunteered for unpaid Civilian Public Service jobs to demonstrate their patriotism; many worked in mental hospitals. The Jehovah's Witness denomination, however, refused to participate in any forms of service, and thousands of its young men refused to register and went to prison.

As part of the 1940 Selective Service and Training Act, the Civilian Public Service was formed for conscientious objectors to do work considered to be of "national importance". What type of work varied based on the location of the camps and what was needed. Overall, about 43,000 conscientious objectors (COs) refused to take up arms. About 6,000 COs went to prison, especially the Jehovah's Witnesses. About 12,000 served in Civilian Public Service (CPS)—but never received any veterans benefits. About 25,000 or more performed noncombatant jobs in the military, and did receive postwar veterans benefits.

A rare but notable example of pacifism from within the government came from Jeannette Rankin's opposition to the war. Rankin voted against the war particularly because she saw women and peace to be 'inseparable', and even actively encouraged women to do more to prevent the war in America.

=== Suspected disloyalty ===
Civilian support for the war was widespread, with isolated cases of draft resistance. The Federal Bureau of Investigation was already tracking elements that were suspected of loyalty to Germany, Japan, or Italy, and many were arrested in the weeks after the attack on Pearl Harbor. Seven thousand German and Italian aliens (who were not US citizens) were moved back from the West Coast, along with some 100,000 of Japanese descent. Some enemy aliens were held without trial during the entire war. The US citizens accused of supporting Germany were given public trials, and often were freed.

== Population movements ==
There was large-scale migration to industrial centers, especially the West Coast. Millions of wives followed their husbands to military camps; for many families, especially from farms, the moves were permanent. One 1944 survey of migrants in Portland, Oregon and San Diego found that three quarters wanted to stay after the war. Many new military training bases were established or enlarged, especially in the South. Large numbers of African Americans left the cotton fields and headed for the cities. Housing was increasingly difficult to find in industrial centers, as there was no new non-military construction.

=== Transportation ===
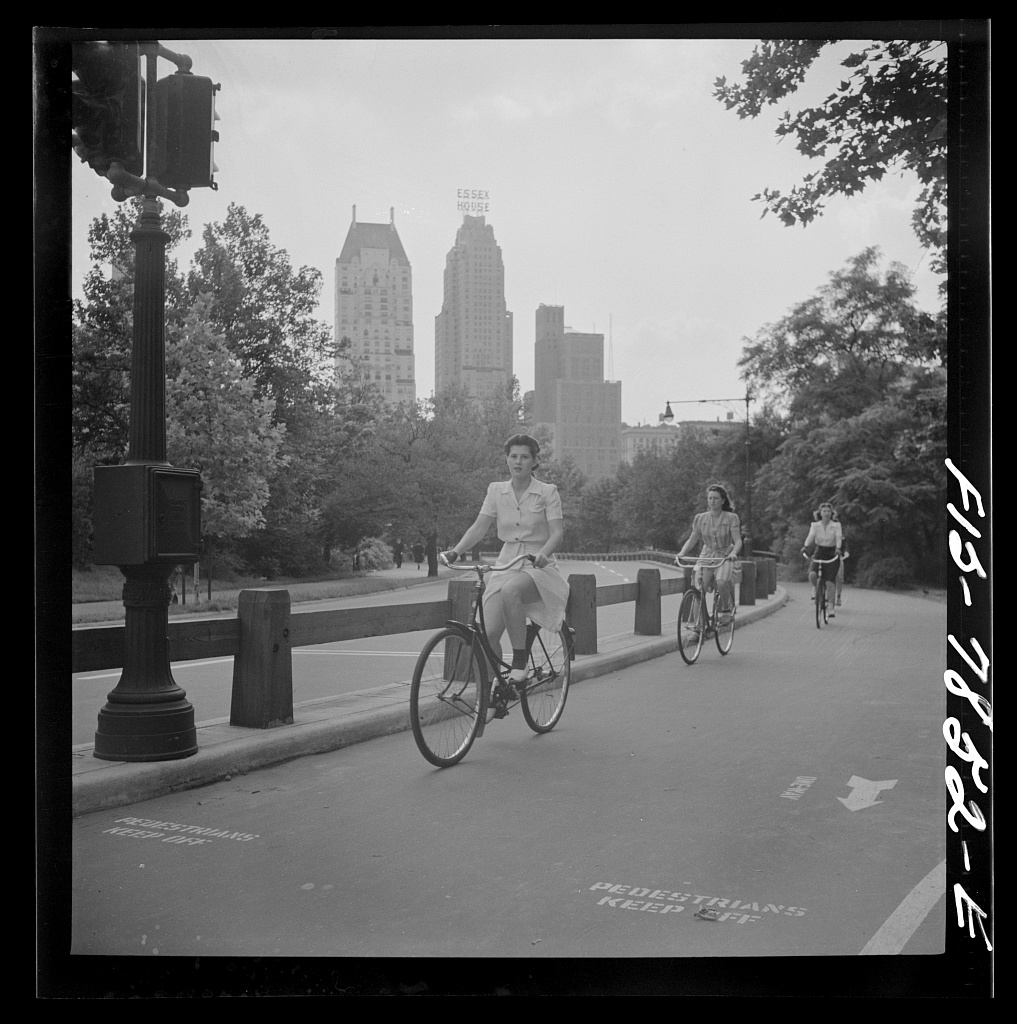
Women cycling in Central Park in New York City, September 1942. Due to governmental restrictions, many Americans used bicycles instead of cars during World War II.

During the war, the Office of Defense Transportation (ODT) was created to help regulate transportation and people were compelled to reduce travelling for personal reasons. Those that drove cars were expected to make only necessary journeys and to carpool. People ended up walking and bicycling more often while bus and rail usages increased to levels that were never seen until that point.

When the United States entered World War II, it was a vastly motorized country, as about 85% of all passenger travel came from private cars while all other forms of mass transit made up about 14% of passenger travel. Commuting by car was limited by the ODT through car, tire and gasoline rationing, banning pleasure driving, regulating the movement of commercial vehicles, establishing a national 35 miles per hour (56 km/h) speed limit along with public campaigns and carpooling programs. What was defined as pleasure driving was ambiguous and the policy banning it was unpopular. The newly established speed limit was enforced by state and local level officials. Exemptions were made to the national speed limit for military and emergencies vehicles that were on duties that required speedier travel times. During the war, taxis were also regulated by the ODT.

In 1941 prior to the United States entering the war, 3.4 million passengers were transported both across the Atlantic Ocean and on intercity travel throughout the United States by all modes of public transportation.

Railroads had seen a decline in travel during the 1920s and '30s, with World War II reversing this decline as the passenger travel dramatically increased. This gain in railroad travel largely came from military passengers; during the war 43 million soldiers were transported, an average of 1 million per month.

Many of the country’s airlines ended up cancelling their regular flights and transferred 200 of their 360 aircraft to the military, which placed them under the Air Transport Command for operations to every inhabited continent. During the war "casual" air travel practically disappeared in the United States.

=== Racial tensions ===
The large-scale movement of black Americans from the rural South to urban and defense centers in the North and the West (and some in the South) during the Second Great Migration led to local confrontations over jobs and housing shortages. The cities were relatively peaceful; much-feared large-scale race riots did not happen, but there was nevertheless violence on both sides, as in the 1943 race riot in Detroit and the anti-Mexican Zoot Suit Riots in Los Angeles in 1943. The "zoot suit" was a highly conspicuous costume worn by Mexican American teenagers in Los Angeles. As historian Roger Bruns notes, "the Zoot suit also represented a stark visual expression of culture for Mexican Americans, about making a statement—a mark of defiance against the place in society in which they found themselves." They gained admiration from within their in-group, and "disgust and ridicule from others, especially the Anglos."

== Role of women ==
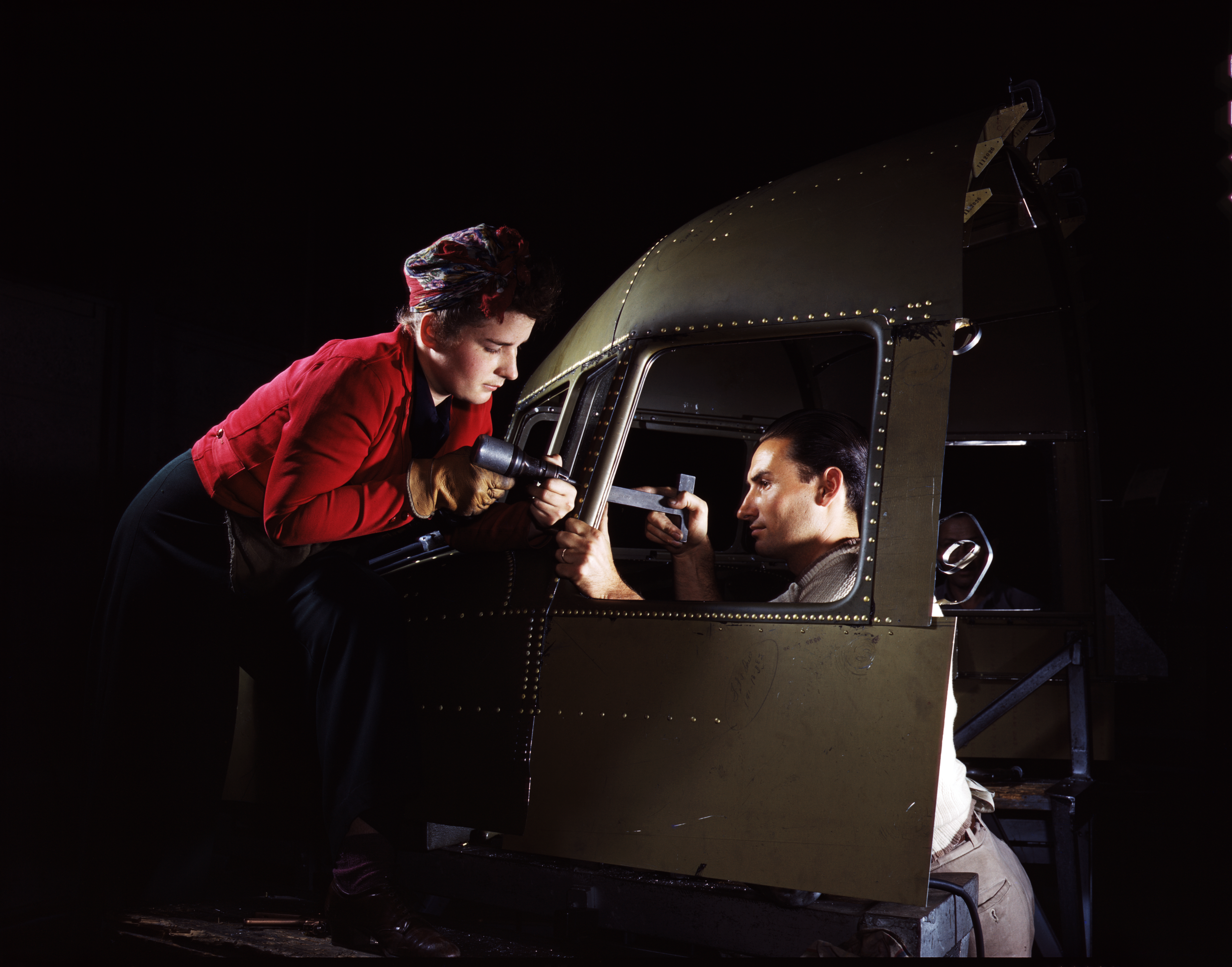
Riveting team working on the cockpit shell of a C-47 transport at the plant of North American Aviation. Office of War Information photo by Alfred T. Palmer, 1942.

Standlee (2010) argues that during the war the traditional gender division of labor changed somewhat, as the "home" or domestic female sphere expanded to include the "home front". Meanwhile, the public sphere—the male domain—was redefined as the international stage of military action.

=== Employment ===
Wartime mobilization drastically changed the sexual divisions of labor for women, as young able-bodied men were sent overseas and wartime manufacturing production increased. Throughout the war, according to Susan Hartmann (1982), an estimated 6.5 million women entered the labor force. Women, many of whom were married, took a variety of paid jobs in a multitude of vocational jobs, many of which were previously exclusive to men. The greatest wartime gain in female employment was in the manufacturing industry, where more than 2.5 million additional women represented an increase of 140 percent by 1944. This was catalyzed by the "Rosie the Riveter" phenomenon.

The composition of the marital status of women who went to work changed considerably throughout the war. One in every ten married women entered the labor force during the war, and they represented more than three million of the new female workers, while 2.89 million were single and the rest widowed or divorced. For the first time in the nation's history, there were more married women than single women in the female labor force. In 1944, thirty-seven percent of all adult women were reported in the labor force, but nearly fifty percent of all women were employed at some time during that year at the height of wartime production. In the same year the unemployment rate hit an all-time historical low of 1.2%.

According to Hartmann (1982), the women who sought employment, based on various surveys and public opinion reports at the time suggests that financial reasoning was the justification for entering the labor force; however, patriotic motives made up another large portion of women's desires to enter. Women whose husbands were at war were more than twice as likely to seek jobs.

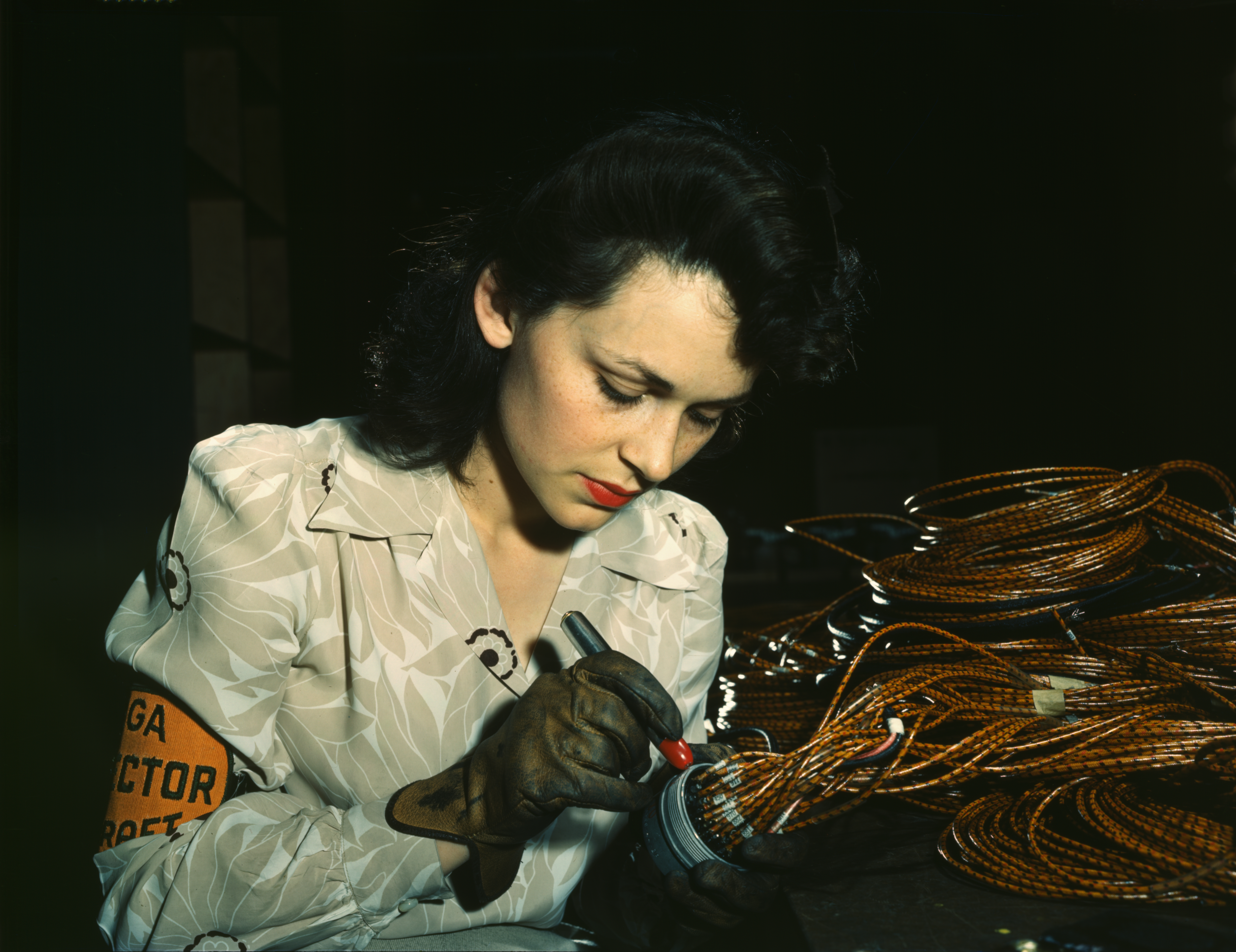
Woman aircraft worker checking assemblies. California, 1942.

Fundamentally, women were thought to be taking work defined as "men's work;" however, the work women did typically catered to specific skill sets that management thought women could handle. Management also advertized women's work as an extension of domesticity. For example, in a Sperry Corporation recruitment pamphlet the company stated, "Note the similarity between squeezing orange juice and the operation of a small drill press." A publication used in the Ford Motor Company’s huge Willow Run aircraft manufacturing plant (where in one three-day period workers were able to complete a four-engine Consolidated B-24 Liberator bomber every twenty-two minutes) proclaimed, "The ladies have shown they can operate drill presses as well as egg beaters." One manager was even quoted as saying, "Why should men, who from childhood on never so much as sewed on buttons be expected to handle delicate instruments better than women who have plied embroidery needles, knitting needles, and darning needles all their lives?" In these instances, women were hired to do jobs that male managers thought they could perform based on sex-typing.

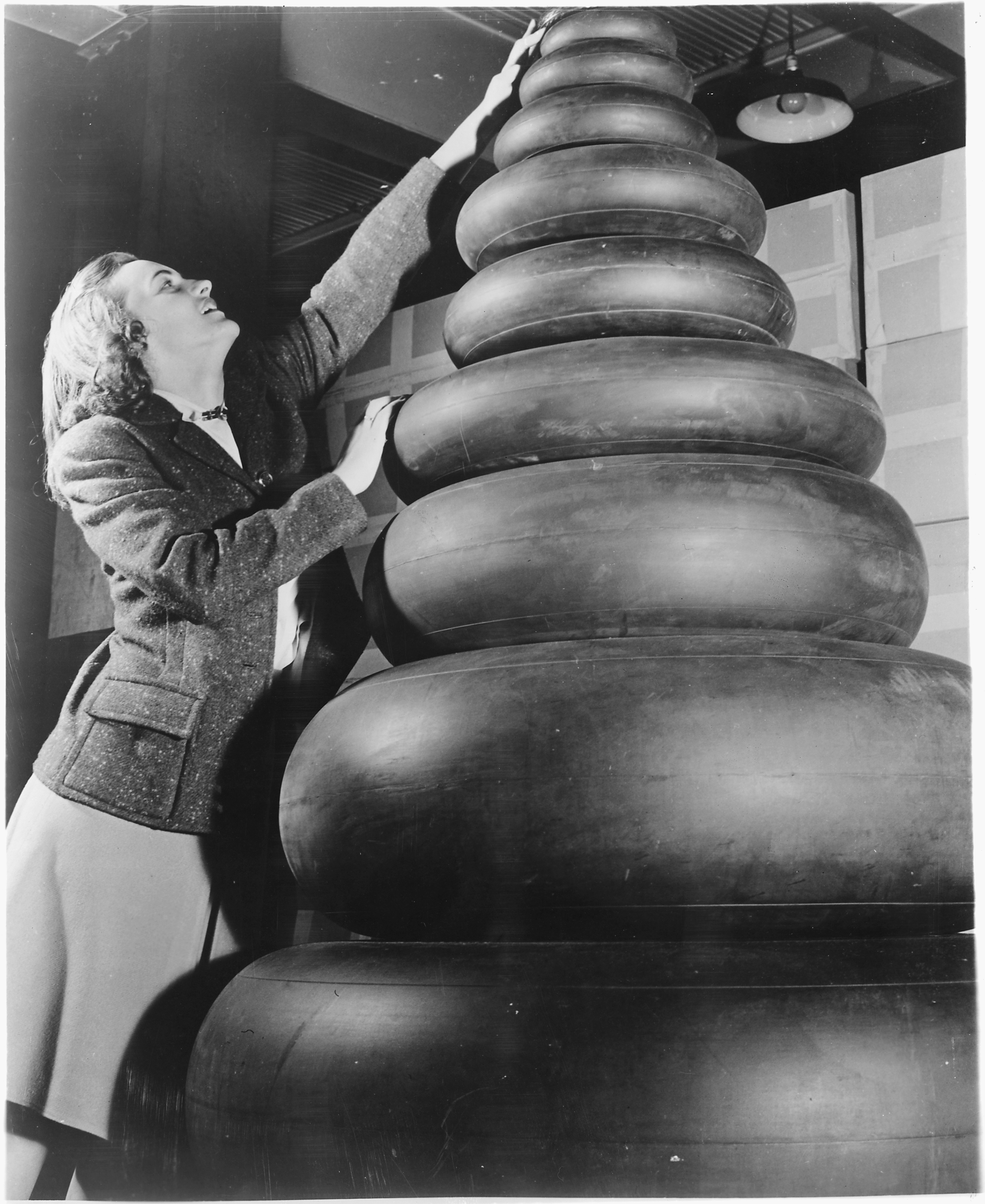
Woman standing next to a wide range of tire sizes required by military aircraft

Following the war, many women left their jobs voluntarily. One Twin Cities Army Ammunition Plant (formally Twin Cities Ordnance Plant) worker in New Brighton, Minnesota confessed, "I will gladly get back into the apron. I did not go into war work with the idea of working all my life. It was just to help out during the war." Other women were laid off by employers to make way for returning veterans who did not lose their seniority due to the war.

There are a few examples of reluctance of women to take on wartime jobs. For example, due to labour shortages the American government had to actively promote the war to civilians and the War Manpower Commission used propaganda to sell the war to American women. There was a change in attitudes regarding women in employment in wartime America, and the government started to promote women in work as part of nature, and those that resisted or were reluctant to find work were slackers.

By the end of the war, many men who entered into the service did not return. This left women to take up the sole responsibility of the household and provide economically for the family.

=== Nursing ===
A majority of female civilian nurses volunteered for the Army Nurse Corps or the Navy Nurse Corps. These women automatically became officers. Teenaged girls enlisted in the Cadet Nurse Corps. To cope with the growing shortage on the homefront, thousands of retired nurses volunteered to help out in local hospitals.

=== Volunteer activities ===
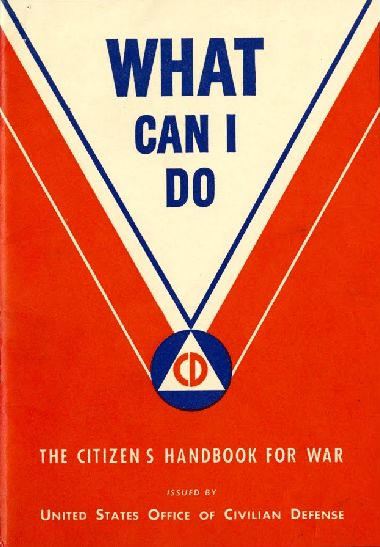
What Can I Do? The Citizen's Handbook for War US Office of Civilian Defense 1942

Women staffed millions of jobs in community service roles, such as nursing, the USO, and the Red Cross. Unorganized women were encouraged to collect and turn in materials that were needed by the war effort. Women collected fats rendered during cooking, children formed balls of aluminum foil they peeled from chewing gum wrappers and also created rubber band balls, which they contributed to the war effort. Hundreds of thousands of men joined civil defense units to prepare for disasters, such as enemy bombing.

The Women Airforce Service Pilots (WASP) mobilized 1,000 civilian women to fly new warplanes from the factories to airfields located on the east coast of the US. This was historically significant because flying a warplane had always been a male role. No American women flew warplanes in combat.

=== Baby boom ===
Marriage and motherhood came back as prosperity empowered couples who had postponed marriage. The birth rate started shooting up in 1941, paused in 1944–45 as 12 million men were in uniform, then continued to soar until reaching a peak in the late 1950s. This was the "Baby Boom".

In a New Deal-like move, the federal government set up the "EMIC" program that provided free prenatal and natal care for the wives of servicemen below the rank of sergeant.

Housing shortages, especially in the munitions centers, forced millions of couples to live with parents or in makeshift facilities. Little housing had been built in the Depression years, so the shortages grew steadily worse until about 1949 when a massive housing boom finally caught up with demand. (After 1944 much of the new housing was supported by the G.I. Bill.)

Federal law made it difficult to divorce absent servicemen, so the number of divorces peaked when they returned in 1946. In long-range terms, divorce rates changed little.

=== Housewives ===
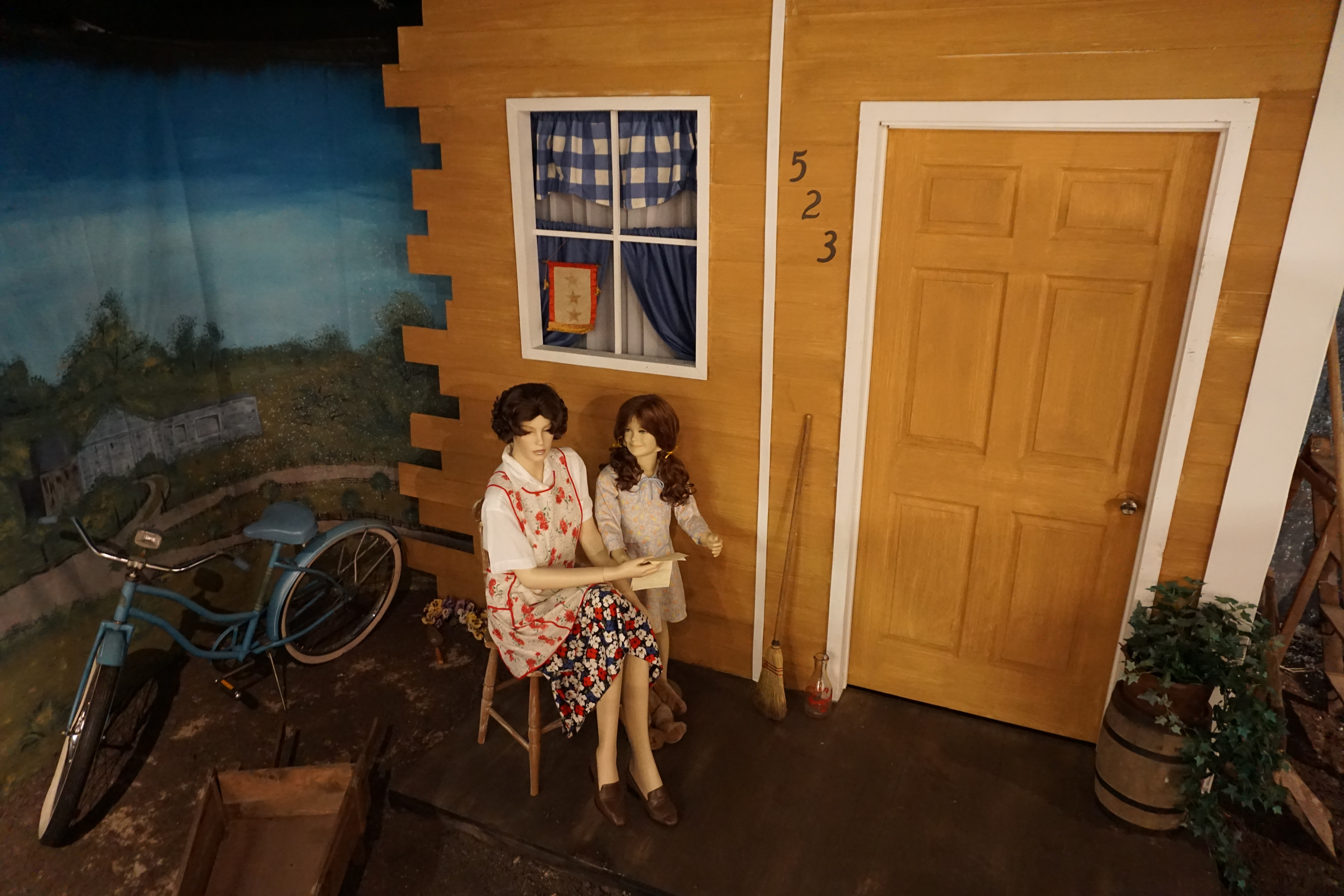
A World War II American home front diorama, depicting a woman and her daughter, at the Audie Murphy American Cotton Museum

Juggling their roles as mothers due to the Baby Boom and the jobs they filled while the men were at war, women strained to complete all tasks set before them. The war caused cutbacks in automobile and bus service and migration from farms and towns to munitions centers. Those housewives who worked found the dual role difficult to handle.

Stress came when sons, husbands, fathers, brothers, and fiancés were drafted and sent to faraway training camps, preparing for a war in which nobody knew how many would be killed. Millions of wives tried to relocate near their husbands' training camps.

== Racial politics of the war ==
=== Immigration policies during and after World War II ===
During World War II the trend in immigration policies was both more and less restrictive. The United States immigration policies focused more on national security and were driven by foreign policy imperatives. Legislation such as the Chinese Exclusion Act of 1882 was finally repealed. This Act was the first law in the United States that excluded a specific group—the Chinese—from migrating to the United States. But during World War II, with the Chinese as allies, the United States passed the Magnuson Act, also known as the Chinese Exclusion Repeal Act of 1943. There was also the Nationality Act of 1940, which clarified how to become and remain a citizen. Specifically, it allowed immigrants who were not citizens, such as Filipinos or those in the outside territories to gain citizenship by enlisting in the army. In contrast, Japanese and Japanese-Americans were subject to internment in the US. There was also legislation such as the Smith Act, formally known as the Alien Registration Act of 1940, which required all citizens of foreign countries in the US to provide fingerprints and certain personal information to the government. The Smith Act’s provisions were used to indict communists, anarchists, and fascists who were thought to be trying to disrupt the war effort. Another program was the Bracero Program, which allowed nearly 5 million Mexican workers to come and work in the United States in two decades.

When World War II broke out in 1939, a common belief spread that Germany was planting spies and saboteurs in the US under the guise of immigration. American consuls, under the encouragement of US Assistant Secretary of State Breckinridge Long (the head of visa related affairs in the US State Department), screened visa applicants in minute detail, to the point that few could ever pass "the endless criteria to prove they were not 'likely to become a public charge.'" Long was described as being anti-Semitic and is judged to have made it harder for Jewish refugees to come to the United States.

After World War II, there was also the Truman Directive of 1945, which did not allow more people to migrate but did use the immigration quotas to let in more displaced people after the war. There was also the War Brides Act of 1945, which allowed spouses of US soldiers to get an expedited path towards citizenship. In contrast, the 1952 Immigration and Nationality Act, also known as theMcCarran-Walter Act, turned away migrants based not on their country of origin but rather whether they were immoral or diseased.

==== Repatriation of Americans abroad ====
When World War II began in Europe during 1939, the United States attempted to repatriate approximately 100,000 Americans who were in Europe. The Special Division was created within the US State Department to handle matters involving the war and giving assistance to Americans who were abroad and being repatriated, with Breckinridge Long being given responsibility of the Special Division. The US government ended up chartering six ships from United States Lines to repatriate Americans. On November 4, 1939, the Neutrality Act was signed into law, which banned American ships from traveling to "'states engaged in armed conflict.'" and by early November 75,000 Americans had been repatriated from Europe.

On the German declaration of war against the United States and the beginning of The Final Solution, the State Department once again attempted to repatriate more Americans. This was difficult as there was no way to communicate with them and tell them about the possibility of repatriation. Joseph Green of the Special Division suggested looking at passports issued in Europe in 1941 along with those passports validated in 1940 or 1941 and asking their holders if they were looking to stay in Europe. Long said that it was impractical to leave it to the Swiss to handle this matter, but denied the Swiss access to the relevant American files. A memo written by Joseph Green stated that 5,111 Americans were interned in Germany, with 1,191 having passports. Germany said that American civilians would be treated similarly to the way POWs were, with Germany arresting American civilians in Berlin "and the Eastern territories" in what they said was a response to how the United States was treating German citizens. The United States did not repatriate Americans in Slovakia, as Slovakia was trying to use them as political leverage; nor from Hungary, for logistical reasons. By September 1944, 30,000 American citizens were still in Europe, either voluntarily or involuntarily.

=== Internment ===
In 1942 the War Department demanded that all enemy nationals be removed from war zones on the West Coast. The question became how to evacuate the estimated 120,000 people of Japanese ancestry living on the Pacific Coast of the continental United States. Roosevelt looked at the secret evidence available to him: the Japanese in the Philippines had collaborated with the Japanese invasion troops; most of the adult Japanese in California had been strong supporters of Japan in the war against China. There was evidence of espionage compiled by code-breakers that decrypted messages to Japan from agents in North America and Hawaii before and after the attack on Pearl Harbor. These MAGIC cables were kept a secret from all but those with the highest clearance, such as Roosevelt. On February 19, 1942, Roosevelt signed Executive Order 9066 which set up designated military areas "from which any or all persons may be excluded." The most controversial part of the order included American born children and youth who had dual US and Japanese citizenship.

In February 1943, when activating the 442nd Regimental Combat Team—a unit composed mostly of American-born American citizens of Japanese descent living in Hawaii—Roosevelt said, "No loyal citizen of the United States should be denied the democratic right to exercise the responsibilities of his citizenship, regardless of his ancestry. The principle on which this country was founded and by which it has always been governed is that Americanism is a matter of the mind and heart; Americanism is not, and never was, a matter of race or ancestry." In 1944, the Supreme Court upheld the legality of the executive order in the Korematsu v. United States case. The executive order remained in force until December when Roosevelt released the Japanese internees, except for those who announced their intention to return to Japan.

Fascist Italy was an official enemy, and citizens of Italy were also forced away from "strategic" coastal areas in California. Altogether, 58,000 Italians were forced to relocate. Known spokesmen for Benito Mussolini were arrested and held in prison. The restrictions were dropped in October 1942, and Italy became a co-belligerent of the Allies in 1943. In the east, however, the large Italian populations of the northeast, especially in munitions-producing centers such as Bridgeport, Connecticut and New Haven, Connecticut, faced no restrictions and contributed just as much to the war effort as other Americans.

By the time of the war, the United States had a large population of ethnic Germans. Among residents of the United States in 1940, more than 1.2 million persons had been born in Germany, 5 million had two native-German parents, and 6 million had one native-German parent. Many more had distant German ancestry. During the war, the United States detained at least 11,000 ethnic Germans, overwhelmingly German nationals, between the years 1940 and 1948 in two designated camps at Fort Douglas, Utah, and Fort Oglethorpe, Georgia.

=== FEPC ===
The Fair Employment Practice Committee (FEPC) was the result of a federal executive order requiring companies with government contracts not to discriminate based on race or religion. It assisted African Americans in obtaining defense industry jobs during the second wave of the Great Migration of southern blacks to Northern and Western war production and urban centers. Under pressure from A. Philip Randolph's growing March on Washington Movement, on June 25, 1941, President Roosevelt created the Fair Employment Practices Committee (FEPC) by signing Executive Order 8802. It said, "there shall be no discrimination in the employment of workers in defense industries or government because of race, creed, color, or national origin". In 1943 Roosevelt greatly strengthened FEPC with a new executive order, #9346. It required that all government contracts have a non-discrimination clause. FEPC was the most significant breakthrough ever for Blacks and women on the job front. During the war, the federal government operated airfields, shipyards, supply centers, ammunition plants, and other facilities that employed millions. FEPC rules applied and guaranteed equality of employment rights. These facilities shut down when the war ended. In the private sector, the FEPC was generally successful in enforcing non-discrimination in the North and West but did not attempt to challenge segregation in the South, and in the border region, its intervention led to hate strikes by angry white workers.

=== African Americans and the Double V campaign ===
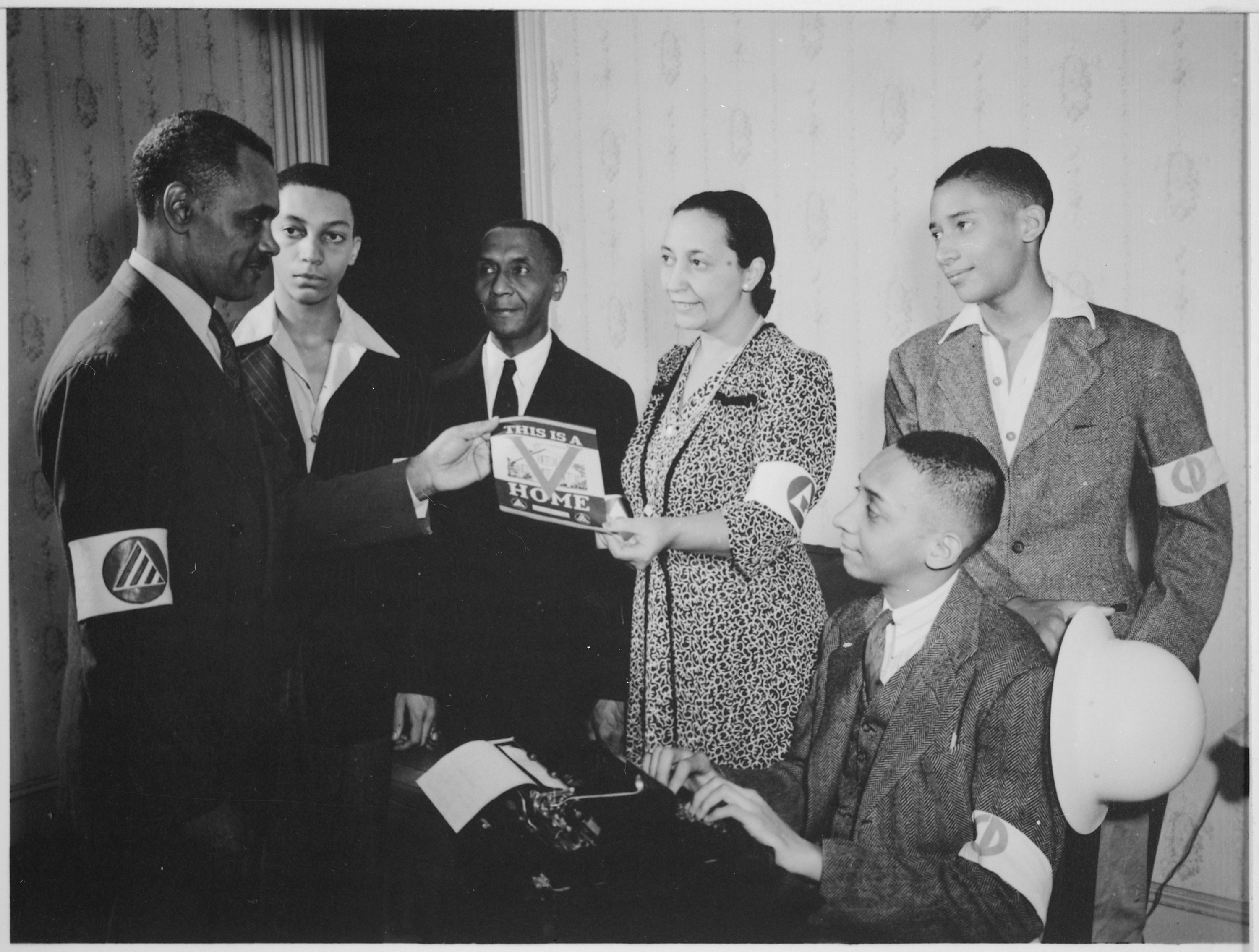
Participants in the Double V campaign, 1942. From the collection of the National Archives and Records Administration.

The African American community in the United States resolved on a Double V campaign: victory over fascism abroad, and victory over discrimination at home. During the second phase of the Great Migration, five million African-Americans relocated from rural and poor Southern farms to urban and munitions centers in Northern and Western states in search of racial, economic, social, and political opportunities. Racial tensions remained high in these cities, particularly in overcrowding in housing as well as competition for jobs. As a result, cities such as Detroit, New York, and Los Angeles experienced race riots in 1943, leading to dozens of deaths. Black newspapers created the Double V campaign to build black morale and head off radical action.

Most black women had been farm laborers or domestics before the war. Working with the federal Fair Employment Practices Committee, the NAACP, and CIO unions, these Black women fought a "Double V campaign"—fighting against the Axis abroad and restrictive hiring practices at home. Their efforts redefined citizenship, equating their patriotism with war work, and seeking equal employment opportunities, government entitlements, and better working conditions as conditions appropriate for full citizens. In the South, black women worked in segregated jobs; in the West and most of the North, they were integrated. However, wildcat strikes erupted in Detroit, Baltimore, and Evansville, Indiana where white migrants from the South refused to work alongside black women.

=== Racism in propaganda ===
Pro-American media during the war tended to portray the Axis powers in a negative light.

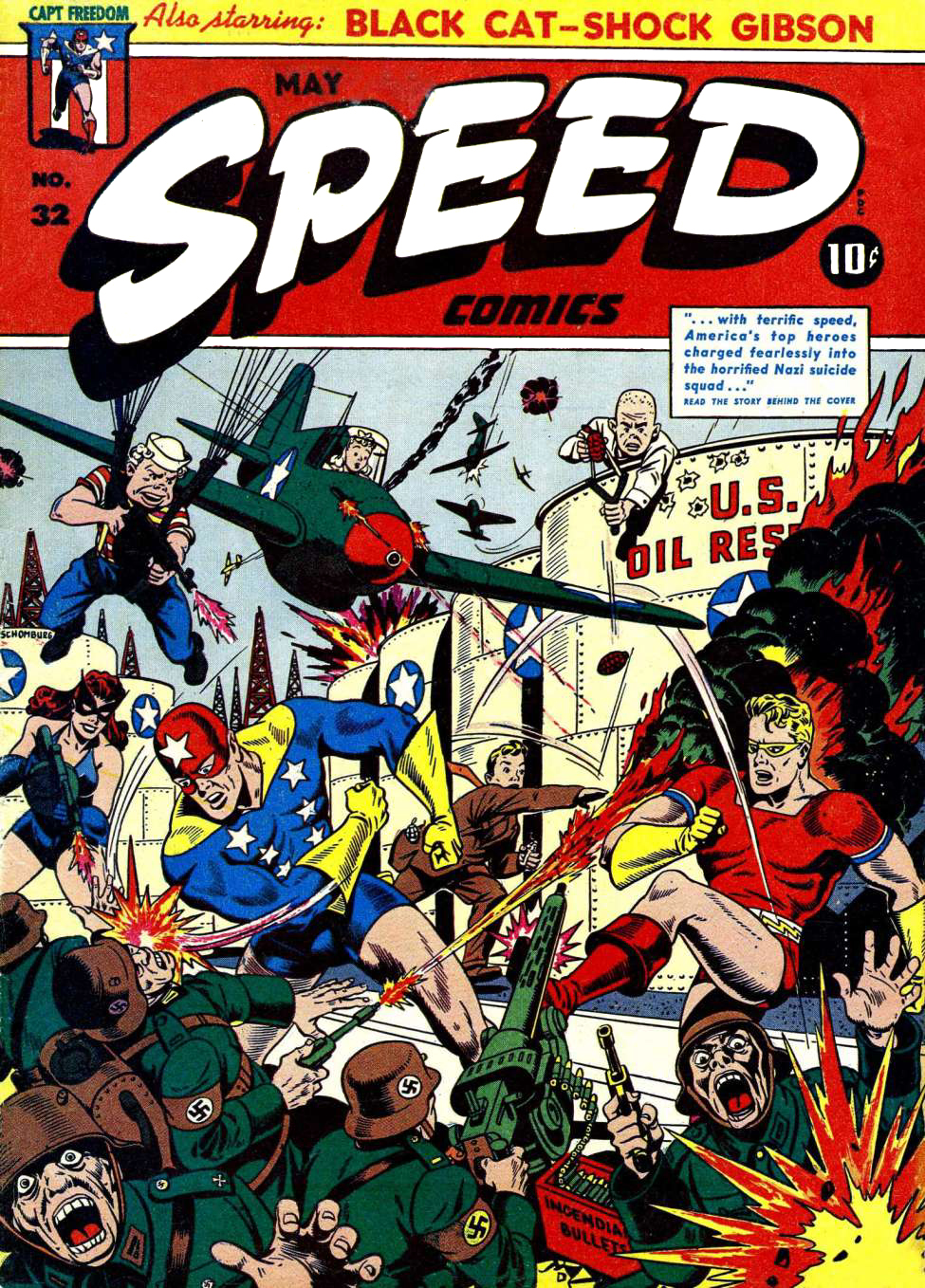
With the war in full swing, patriotically themed comic books were an important source of propaganda.

Germans were portrayed as weak, barbaric, or stupid, and were heavily associated with Nazism and Nazi imagery. For example, the comic book Captain America No. 1 features the titular superhero punching Hitler. Similar anti-German sentiments existed in cartoons as well. The Popeye cartoon, Seein' Red, White, 'N' Blue (aired on February 19, 1943), ends with Uncle Sam punching a sickly-looking Hitler. In the Donald Duck cartoon Der Fuehrer's Face, Donald Duck is portrayed as a Nazi living in Germany, where the Nazi war effort is heavily satirized and caricatured.

American media portrayed the Japanese negatively as well. While attacks on Germans were generally focused on high-level Nazi officials such as Hitler, Himmler, Goebbels, and Göring, the Japanese were targeted more broadly. Portrayals of the Japanese ranged from showing them being vicious and feral, as on the cover of Marvel Comics' Mystery Comics no. 32, to mocking their physical appearance and speech patterns. In the Looney Tunes cartoon Tokio Jokio (aired May 13, 1943), the Japanese people are all shown to be dim-witted, obsessed with being polite, cowardly, and physically short with buckteeth, big lips, squinty eyes, and glasses. The entire cartoon is also narrated in broken English, with the letter "R" often replacing "L" in pronunciation of words, a common stereotype. Japanese slurs were commonly used, such as "Jap", "monkey face", and "slanty eyes". These stereotypes are also seen in Theodor Geisel's comics created during the Second World War.

== Wartime politics ==
=== Prewar background ===
When World War II began in Europe in September 1939, the Neutrality Acts of the 1930s forbade the United States government from involvement. A poll taken in January 1940 found that 88 percent of Americans opposed entering the war. However, as time went on public opinion began to shift toward joining the war. The most notable non-interventionist group was the America First Committee which was formed in September 1940. Another smaller non-interventionist group was Keep America Out of War Congress (originally known as the Keep America Out of War Committee) or KAOWC which was a socialist-pacifist organization formed in March 1938 lasting until the Attack on Pearl Harbor. With regards for pro-interventionist forces, one organization was the Committee to Defend America by Aiding the Allies (CDAAA) which was formed in May 1940. After the attack on Pearl Harbor, the United States joined the war and this practically ended any debate about entering the war.

Roosevelt easily won the bitterly contested 1940 election, but the Conservative coalition maintained a tight grip on Congress regarding taxes and domestic issues. Wendell Willkie, the defeated GOP candidate in 1940, became a roving ambassador for Roosevelt. After Vice President Henry A. Wallace became enmeshed in a series of squabbles with other high officials, Roosevelt stripped him of his administrative responsibilities and dropped him from the 1944 ticket. Roosevelt in cooperation with big-city party leaders replaced Wallace with Missouri Senator Harry S. Truman. Truman was best known for investigating waste, fraud, and inefficiency in wartime programs.

=== Wartime events ===
Despite conspiracy theories saying FDR would cancel the 1942 elections, they went ahead as they previously had prior to the war. Among the 80 million men and women eligible to vote, only 28 million did so. The election did not go well for FDR and his party as they lost seven seats in the Senate and 47 in the House of Representatives; with a Conservative coalition of Republicans and Southern Democrats taking control of both houses on domestic issues. Reducing the draft age to 18, regulations and restrictions from the war along with rationing and a drift away from the New Deal are listed as hurting the Democrats that year.

In the 1944 presidential election, Roosevelt defeated Thomas Dewey, who came from the conservative wing of the Republican Party, in a close election. Several Republicans had run for the presidential nomination: Wendell Willkie, New York Governor Thomas E. Dewey and Ohio Governor John W. Bricker. Dewey won the nomination, selecting Bricker as his running mate. Willkie mobilized liberal Republicans while Dewey and Bricker attracted Republicans from the conservative bloc of the party. Campaigning during the 1944 presidential election was similar to prewar campaigns.

=== Voting ===
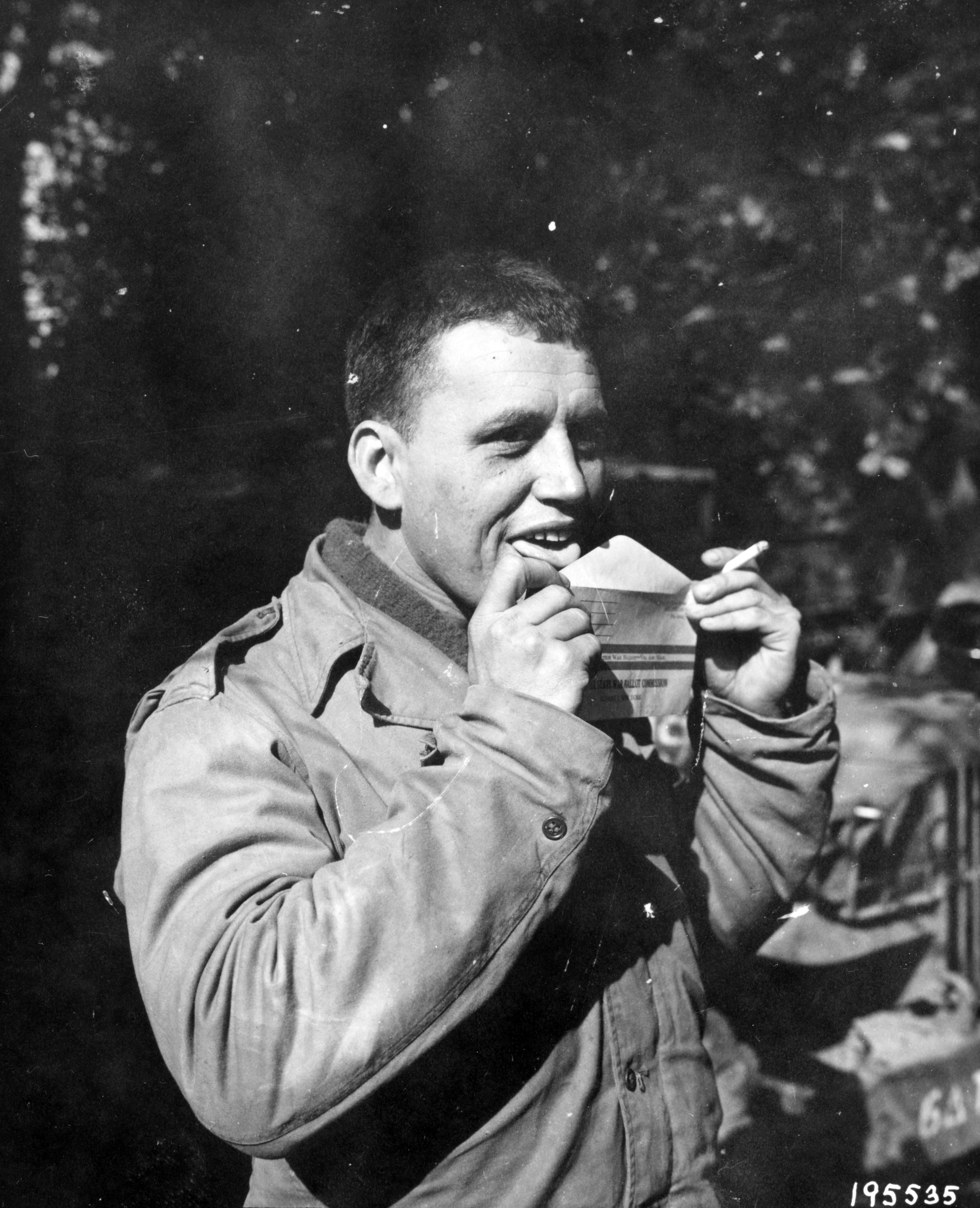
A soldier sealing his ballot, October 1944

During World War II, traditional means of voting were unavailable to soldiers drafted into the military and women serving in auxiliary corps such as the Women's Army Corps or volunteer organizations such as the Red Cross; so instead those working/serving away from home had to cast absentee ballots if they chose to vote. Many states during the war did not have absentee voting laws and those laws that did exist, did not take into account the circumstances generated by the war. To solve this issue with absentee voting, US Congress passed the 1942 and later 1944 Soldier Voting Acts.

The Soldier Voting Act of 1942 was enacted on September 16, 1942, allowing for men and women serving the country to cast an absentee ballot if they still lived in the United States. It nullified any state voting registration requirements and prohibited the use of poll taxes for those covered by the act. With the 1942 elections being held only seven weeks after the act was passed, states did not have much time to prepare ballots and turnout was low; of the 4 million men serving in the military along with "tens of thousands of women", only 28,000 absentee ballots were cast, a turnout rate for those in the armed forces of less than one percent. The Soldier Voting Act of 1944 was passed in April that year. As part of the act a federal ballot was created that allowed for states that did not have adequate voting mechanisms, and the act encouraged states to amend absentee voting laws. The 1944 elections in November did see a significant increase in the number of absentee ballots cast by soldiers, with an estimated 3.4 million absentee votes, about 25% of the number of people serving in the armed forces, being cast.

== Propaganda and culture ==
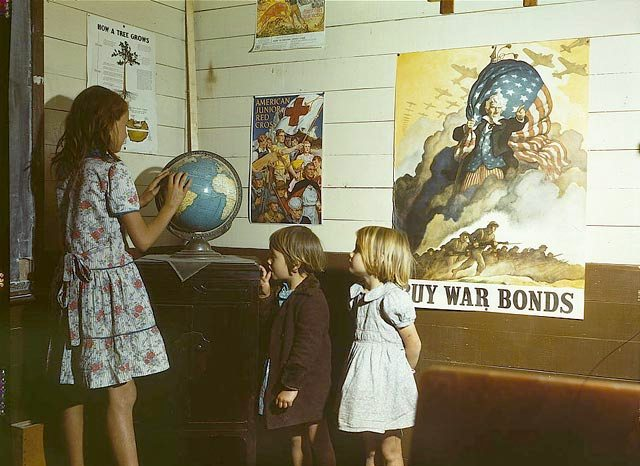
Rural school children in front of homefront posters in San Augustine County, Texas. 1943

Patriotism became the central theme of advertising throughout the war, as large scale campaigns were launched to sell war bonds, promote efficiency in factories, reduce ugly rumors, and maintain civilian morale. The war consolidated the advertising industry's role in American society, deflecting earlier criticism. The media cooperated with the federal government in presenting the official view of the war. All movie scripts had to be pre-approved. For example, there were widespread rumors in the Army to the effect that people on the homefront were slacking off. A Private SNAFU film cartoon (released to soldiers only) belied that rumor. Tin Pan Alley produced patriotic songs to rally the people.

=== Posters ===
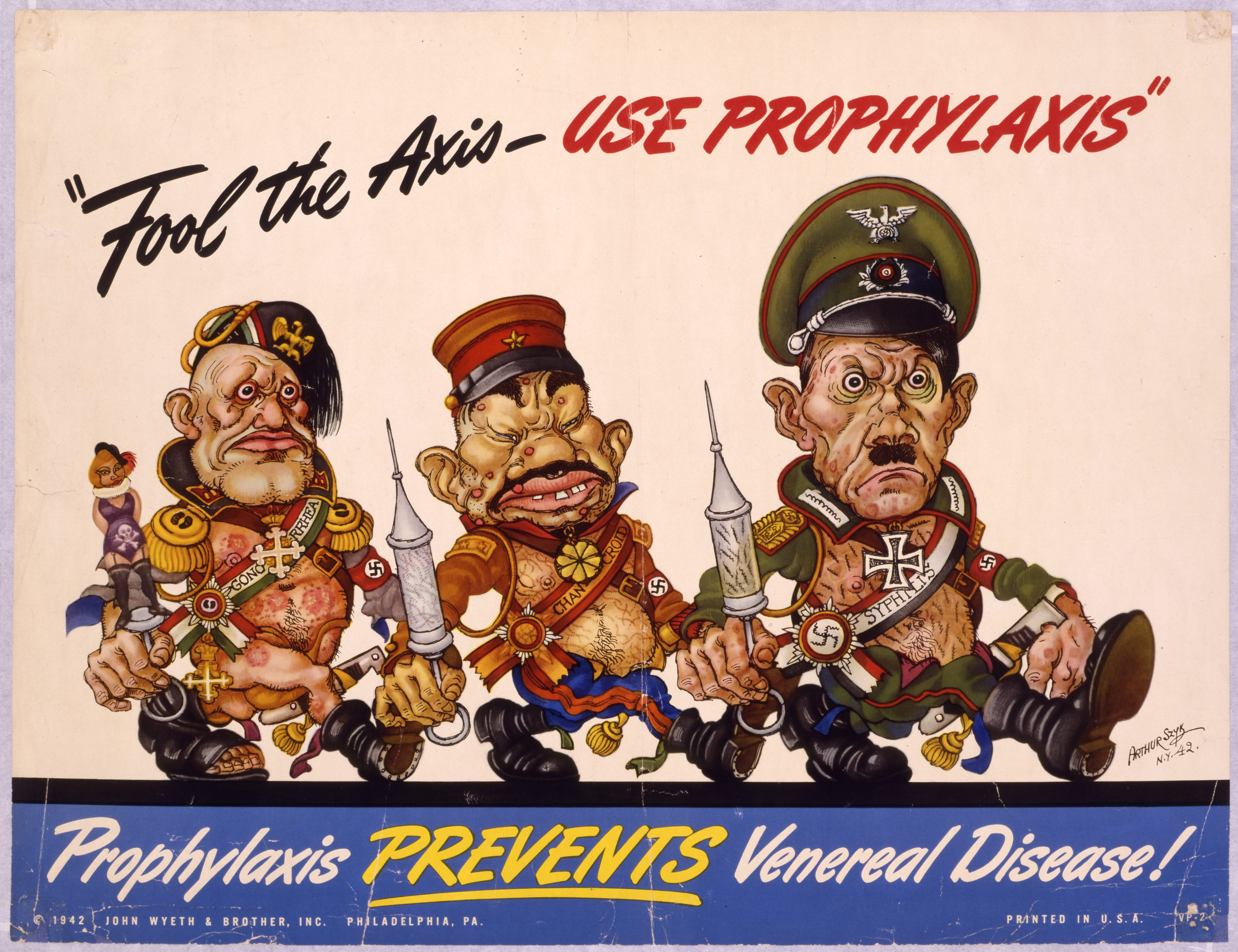
Fool the Axis Use Prophylaxis poster. 1942, Philadelphia

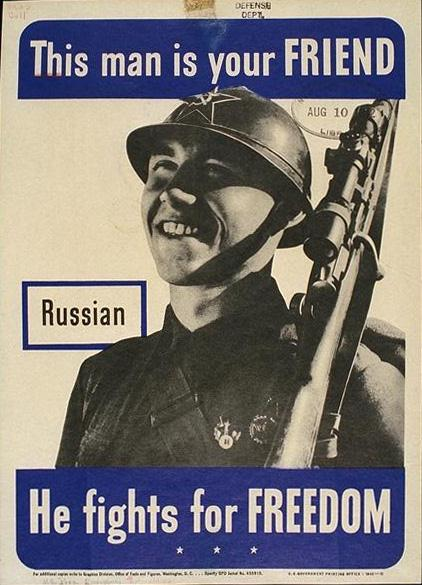
Government poster showing a friendly Soviet soldier, 1942

Posters helped to mobilize the nation. Inexpensive, accessible, and ever-present, the poster was an ideal agent for making war aims the personal mission of every citizen. Government agencies, businesses, and private organizations issued an array of poster images linking the military front with the home front—calling upon every American to boost production at work and home. Some resorted to extreme racial and ethnic caricatures of the enemy, sometimes as hopelessly bumbling cartoon characters, sometimes as evil, half-human creatures.

=== Bond drives ===
A strong aspect of American culture then as now was a fascination with celebrities, and the government used them in its eight war bond campaigns that called on people to save now (and redeem the bonds after the war, when houses, cars, and appliances would again be available). The War Bond drives helped finance the war. Americans were challenged to put at least 10% of every paycheck into bonds. Compliance was high, with entire workplaces earning a special "Minuteman" flag to fly over their plant if all workers belonged to the "Ten Percent Club".

=== Hollywood ===
Hollywood studios also went all-out for the war effort, as studios encouraged their stars (such as Clark Gable and James Stewart) to enlist. Hollywood had military units that made training films—Ronald Reagan narrated many of them. Nearly all of Hollywood made hundreds of war movies that, in coordination with the Office of War Information (OWI), taught Americans what was happening and who the heroes and the villains were. Ninety million people went to the movies every week. Some of the most highly regarded films during this period included Casablanca, Mrs. Miniver, Going My Way, and Yankee Doodle Dandy. Even before active American involvement in the war, the popular Three Stooges comic trio were lampooning the Nazi German leadership, and Nazis in general, with a number of short subject films, starting with You Nazty Spy! released in January 1940 – the very first Hollywood film of any length to satirize Hitler and the Nazis – nearly two years before the United States was drawn into World War II.

Cartoons and short subjects were a major sign of the times, as Warner Brothers Studios and Disney Studios gave unprecedented aid to the war effort by creating cartoons that were both patriotic and humorous, and also contributed to remind movie-goers of wartime activities such as rationing and scrap drives, war bond purchases, and the creation of victory gardens. Warner shorts such as Daffy – The Commando, Draftee Daffy, Herr Meets Hare, and Russian Rhapsody are particularly remembered for their biting wit and unflinching mockery of the enemy (particularly Adolf Hitler, Hideki Tōjō, and Hermann Göring). Their cartoons of Private Snafu, produced for the military as "training films", served to remind many military men of the importance of following proper procedure during wartime, for their safety. MGM also contributed to the war effort with slyly pro-US short cartoon The Yankee Doodle Mouse with "Lt." Jerry Mouse as the hero and Tom Cat as the "enemy".

To heighten the suspense, Hollywood needed to feature attacks on American soil and obtained inspirations for dramatic stories from the Philippines. Indeed, the Philippines became a "homefront" that showed the American way of life threatened by the Japanese enemy. Especially popular were the films Texas to Bataan (1942), Corregidor (1943), Bataan (1943), They Were Expendable (1945), and Back to Bataan (1945).

The OWI had to approve every film before they could be exported. To facilitate the process the OWI's Bureau of Motion Pictures (BMP) worked with producers, directors, and writers before the shooting started to make sure that the themes reflected patriotic values. While Hollywood had been generally nonpolitical before the war, the liberals who controlled OWI encouraged the expression of New Deal liberalism, bearing in mind the huge domestic audience, as well as an international audience that was equally large.

=== Censorship ===
Prior to entering the war, the US government had already done two years of planning in terms of how to conduct censorship. Censorship officially began one hour after the Attack on Pearl Harbor which took place on December 7, 1941, censoring all cable, radiotelephone and telegraphic messages between the Territory of Hawaii and the United States. Control of censorship was temporarily placed under FBI Director J. Edgar Hoover from December 8 until the Office of Censorship was created on December 19 via a presidential executive order, with Byron Price leading the office for the duration of the war. Censorship was both practiced mandatorily and voluntarily depending on the circumstance. International communication was subjected to mandatory censorship, while the domestic press participated on a voluntary basis as the federal government decided mandatory censorship would not be needed as long as patriotic broadcasters and publishers withheld any information that was deemed to harm the Allied war effort.

The war was covered by over 2,000 correspondents supplying their reports to newspapers, magazines, radio networks, and newsreel companies. In the 1930s and '40s most Americans relied on print journalism to get their news. The news was prohibited from covering the travels of the president, the location of the newly moved National Archives or any diplomatic or military missions.

== Local activism ==
One way to enlist everyone in the war effort was scrap collection (called "recycling" decades later). Many everyday commodities were vital to the war effort, and drives were organized to recycle such products as rubber, tin, waste kitchen fats (raw material for explosives), newspaper, lumber, steel, and many others. Popular phrases promoted by the government at the time were "Get into the scrap!" and "Get some cash for your trash" (a nominal sum was paid to the donor for many kinds of scrap items) and Thomas "Fats" Waller even wrote and recorded a song with the latter title. Such commodities as rubber and tin remained highly important as recycled materials until the end of the war, while others, such as steel, were critically needed at first. War propaganda played a prominent role in many of these drives. Nebraska had perhaps the most extensive and well-organized drives; it was mobilized by the Omaha World-Herald newspaper.

== Sports ==
=== Auto racing ===
In July 1942, the Office of Defense Transportation ordered an indefinite ban on auto racing in an effort to conserve rubber and gasoline.

=== Baseball ===
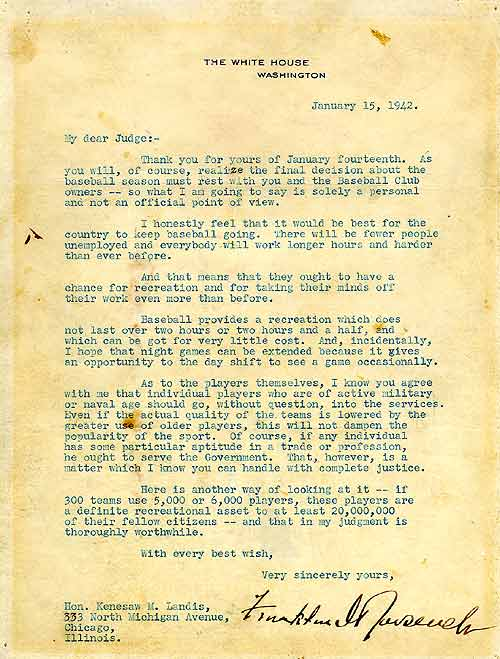
The 1942 "Green Light Letter" sent by President Roosevelt to Commissioner Kenesaw Mountain Landis authorizing wartime baseball

Baseball was at a peak in its popularity as the national pastime at the outset of the war. In January 1942, however, Commissioner of Baseball and former federal judge Kenesaw Mountain Landis handwrote a letter to President Roosevelt asking whether the President felt "professional baseball should continue to operate" given that "these are not ordinary times." Roosevelt wrote back the following day in what became known as the "Green Light Letter" that it would be "thoroughly worthwhile" and "best for the country to keep baseball going." He reasoned that the public would be working longer and harder hours than ever before and therefore had a greater need for recreation than ever before.

In 1943 and 1944, Commissioner Landis, with input from Joseph Bartlett Eastman of the Office of Defense Transportation, ordered that all spring training take place north of the Potomac River and east of the Mississippi River in order to cut down on travel. Major League Baseball (MLB) teams regularly played exhibition games to raise money and morale for the war effort, often against military teams; Ford Frick testified in 1951 before the House Judiciary Committee that MLB teams played 61 games on military bases between 1942 and 1944. The league raised more than $2.1 million (equivalent to $38.4 million in 2025).

Because many of the able-bodied young men of the United States enlisted or were drafted into service, many MLB roster spots went to players deemed physically unfit for service. They ranged from players such as Tommy Holmes, who had a chronic sinus condition, to Pete Gray, who had only one arm. Older stars such as Jimmie Foxx, Lloyd Waner, Ben Chapman, Babe Herman and Hal Trosky also found new playing opportunities and came out of retirement.

=== Basketball ===
After the United States entered the war, the country's two professional basketball leagues, the American Basketball League and National Basketball League, both shrank to four teams. Much of the country's best basketball was played on military bases.

=== Football ===
More than 1,000 players left or postponed their professional football careers due to the war. Due to the depletion of rosters, the Pittsburgh Steelers merged with the Philadelphia Eagles in 1943 to become the Steagles and with the Chicago Cardinals in 1944 to become Card-Pitt. In 1943, the Cleveland Rams suspended operations altogether. During this time, due to the lack of well-rounded athletes available, the National Football League also began allowing free substitutions, which revolutionized the game.

=== Golf ===
The Open was not held between 1942 and 1945 because of the scarcity of the rubber essential to the manufacture of golf balls. Many of the nation's golf courses were also converted to more practical use. For example, Augusta National Golf Club was used to raise cows for beef for Camp Gordon and Congressional Country Club was used as a special ops training ground, while several others were converted to farmland.

== Attacks on US soil ==
Although the Axis powers never launched a full-scale invasion of the United States, there were attacks and acts of sabotage on US soil.

- December 7, 1941 – Attack on Pearl Harbor, a surprise attack that killed almost 2,500 people in the then incorporated Territory of Hawaii which caused the US to enter the war the next day.
- January–August 1942 – Second Happy Time, German U-boats engaged American ships off the US East Coast.
- February 23, 1942 – Bombardment of Ellwood, a Japanese submarine attack on California.
- Attacks on California ships by Japanese submarines
- March 4, 1942 – Operation K, a Japanese reconnaissance over Pearl Harbor following the attack on December 7, 1941.
- June 3, 1942 – August 15, 1943 – Aleutian Islands Campaign, the battle for the then incorporated territory of Alaska.
- June 21–22, 1942 – Bombardment of Fort Stevens, the second attack on a US military base in the continental US in World War II.
- September 9, 1942, and September 29, 1942 – Lookout Air Raids, the only attacks by enemy aircraft on the continental US in World War II.
- November 1944 – April 1945 – Fu-Go balloon bombs, over 9,300 of them were launched by Japan across the Pacific Ocean towards the US to start forest fires. On May 5, 1945, six civilians were killed in Oregon when they stumbled upon a bomb and it exploded, the only deaths to occur in the US as a result of an enemy balloon attack during World War II.

== See also ==
- Ethnic minorities in the United States Armed Forces during World War II
- American music during World War II
- Greatest Generation
- Home front during World War II, for rest of world
- Japanese occupation of the Philippines
- Military history of the United States during World War II
- United States home front during World War I
- California during World War II
- History of Texas § World War II
- US Government films:
  - Why We Fight
  - Black Marketing
  - Campus on the March
  - Henry Browne, Farmer
  - Manpower
  - Negro Colleges in War Time
  - The Arm Behind the Army
