= Congregation Emunath Israel =

Orthodox Jewish congregation in New York City

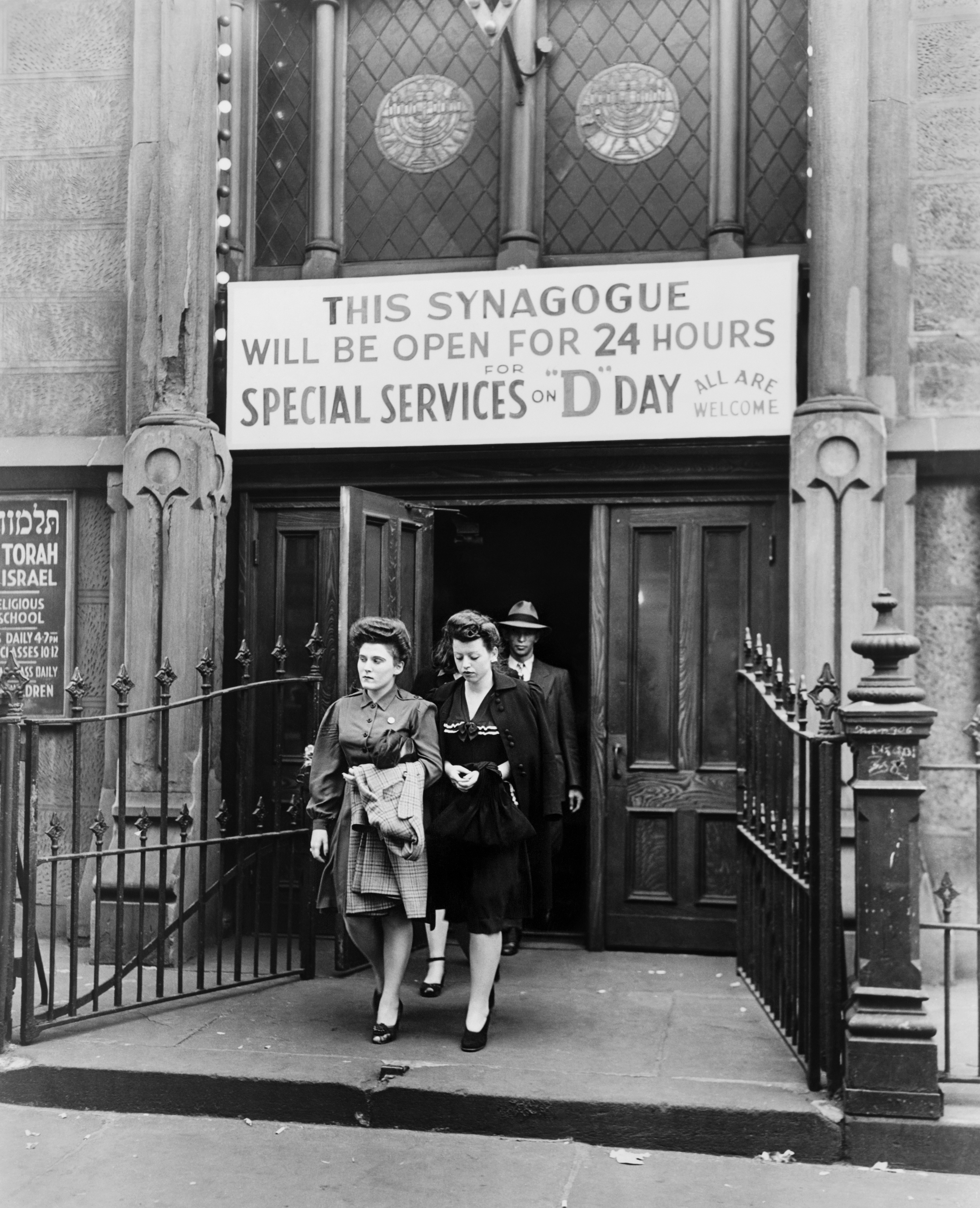
- D-Day services at Emunath Israel (June 6, 1944)
- Nickname: Chelsea Shul
- Formation: 1865
- Type: Orthodox Jewish congregation
- Location: 236 West 23rd Street, Chelsea, Manhattan
- Coordinates: 40°44′40″N 73°59′51″W
- Affiliations: Chabad
- Website: https://www.jgradsnyc.org/

Congregation Emunath Israel, also known as the Chelsea Shul, is an Orthodox Jewish congregation located at 236 West 23rd Street in the Chelsea neighborhood of Manhattan, New York City.

Founded in 1865, the congregation moved into its current home in 1920 after acquiring the former Third Reformed Presbyterian Church. The congregation is affiliated with Chabad.
