= Quebec – Path of Conquest =

- Title Frame
- Directed by: Radford Crawley
- Produced by: Raymond Spottiswoode
- Narrated by: Lorne Greene
- Cinematography: Radford Crawley
- Music by: Lucio Agostini
- Production company: National Film Board of Canada
- Distributed by: National Film Board of Canada; Columbia Pictures of Canada
- Release date: 1942
- Running time: 11 minutes
- Country: Canada
- Language: English

Quebec – Path of Conquest is an 11-minute 1942 Canadian documentary film, made by the National Film Board of Canada as part of the wartime Canada Carries On series. The film was directed by Radford Crawley and produced by Raymond Spottiswoode. Quebec – Path of Conquest describes the importance of the province of Quebec to Canada and the Allied war effort during the Second World War. The film's French version title is Québec, tremplin stratégique.

== Synopsis ==
In 1934, Nazi Germany had identified the resources of Eastern Canada, the Great Lakes and the St. Lawrence Seaway as prime targets in a future global "blueprint for conquest". An Axis attack on North America and Canada would be aimed at this region, and its resources. From rich timberlands in the hinterlands to the mines of the Canadian Shield, the bountiful resources of Quebec have been harnessed for a new purpose. Many of the mineral products of the province, such as chrome, asbestos, mica, gypsum, magnesium and copper are important to the war effort.

The population of Quebec, totalling more than three million residents and countless others living abroad have become a new front in the war. Farmers, factory workers and the ordinary citizen in Quebec have thrown themselves into the war effort. The workers who have a rich heritage of Québécois crafts and hand-made products have been turned into a modern industrial workforce able to handle the most complex and sophisticated machinery.

One of the other significant contributions from Quebec are the weapons of war produced by the province's industry, mainly concentrated in Montreal where munitions factories and aircraft manufacturing plants are built and are running at full capacity. From the airfields along the eastern seaboard come the bombers that are built in North America, as they are ferried across the Atlantic Ocean. The seaports that also are found in this region provide not only the warships but also the merchant shipping from countless nations setting out in convoys to supply Great Britain and other Allies across the Atlantic.

The importance of Quebec cannot be underestimated, nors is the resolve of its people to fight against Axis aggression.

== Production ==
Quebec – Path of Conquest was the part of the wartime Canada Carries On propaganda short film series, produced with financial backing from the Wartime Information Board for the Director of Public Information, Herbert Lash. Like Un du 22e, the first NFB film produced by the French-language division about the Royal 22^{e} Régiment, Quebec – Path of Conquest was aimed specifically at encouraging young French-Canadian men to support the war and enlist.

The images of a mythic Quebec, complete with homespun community events was used to create the impression of a populace united in facing a common enemy, a complete departure from the actual resistance to the war that was occurring among the Québécois. (Note: In the wake of the Canadian conscription plebiscite in 1942 showing strong public support for the war everywhere except in Quebec, the NFB produced Quebec – Path of Conquest as an attempt to sway sympathy with the Québécois.) Typical of the NFB's series of morale-boosting films, Quebec – Path of Conquest used the format of a compilation documentary, relying heavily on newsreel material in order to provide the background to the dialogue. Original footage was shot at Montreal's docks and factories, notably the Montreal factories where munitions and aircraft were manufactured. Ship and rail yards were also prominently featured. (Note: Workers at companies such as Canadian Vickers and Noorduyn built NA-64 Harvard trainers and Consolidated PBY Canso flying boats. The Canadian Pacific Railway’s Angus Shops turned out a range of weapons, including Valentine tanks, while the Montreal Locomotive Works built Ram and Grizzly tanks, and the Sexton self-propelled gun.)

The deep baritone voice of stage actor Lorne Greene was featured in the uncredited narration of Quebec – Path of Conquest. Greene's participation as a narrator was particularly useful in a propaganda film, as he was well known for his work on both radio broadcasts as a news announcer at CBC. In narrating many of the Canada Carries On series, his sonorous recitation led to nickname, "The Voice of Canada", and the "Voice-of-God". When reading grim battle statistics or narrating a particularly serious topic such as Quebec's role in the war effort, he was known as "The Voice of Doom".

== Reception ==
Quebec – Path of Conquest was produced in 35 mm for the theatrical market. Each film in both the NFB The World in Action and Canada Carries On series was shown over a six-month period as part of the shorts or newsreel segments in approximately 800 theatres across Canada.

The NFB had an arrangement with Famous Players theatres to ensure that Canadians from coast-to-coast could see them, with further distribution by Columbia Pictures. After the six-month theatrical tour ended, individual films were made available on 16 mm to schools, libraries, churches and factories, extending the life of these films for another year or two. They were also made available to film libraries operated by university and provincial authorities.

== See also ==
- The Front of Steel (1940)
- The Battle of Brains (1941)
