= Zero Hour (1944 film) =

- Title frame
- Produced by: Stuart Legg
- Narrated by: Lorne Greene
- Music by: Lucio Agostini
- Production company: National Film Board of Canada
- Distributed by: National Film Board of Canada; United Artists; Columbia Pictures
- Release date: 1944
- Running time: 22 minutes
- Country: Canada
- Language: English

Zero Hour is a 22-minute 1944 Canadian documentary film, made by the National Film Board of Canada (NFB) as part of both the wartime Canada Carries On and The World in Action series. The film was produced by Stuart Legg. Zero Hour describes the Axis and Allied invasions that have taken place during the Second World War.

== Synopsis ==
During the Second World War, the Axis powers employed joint or combined operations to launch invasions in Europe and Asia. In Norway, Nazi Germany launched an amphibious invasion while the island of Crete was overwhelmed by an airborne invasion. Japan also had been successful in its Japanese imperialist wars in Asia. In all instances, the invading forces were able to strike quickly, using small lightweight weaponry and the elements of surprise and combined forces to achieve victory.

By 1940, the Allies, who had been reeling from the many defeats, had learned the hard tactical lessons with England being the first to react. After creating the Combined Operations Command, British Commandos, a small, highly mobile raiding and reconnaissance forces began to be used. The commando carried all they needed and operated in the field, to cause disruption and small-scale attacks on communication systems and enemy strongpoints. Larger raids such as the Dieppe Raid in 1942 were preludes to massive invasion operations later.

With Nazi Germany bogged down in Operation Barbarossa, an attack on the Soviet Union, a second front was possible, but first, Allied operations in North Africa with the objective of driving the Axis powers from North Africa, was launched. Next was an assault on Axis-held Italy. Fighting on many fronts, the Wehrmacht was under great pressure.

In 1944, as Allied arsenals built a vast array of weaponry, a massive invasion force was created to invade Fortress Europe, the Axis-controlled areas of Northwest Europe. The preparation, strategy and over-all campaign planning that went into this gigantic task involved a host of nations, including Canada. In the Pacific War, similar preparations for combined amphibious invasions were taking place, with the U.S. island-hopping campaign successfully begun to wrest back occupied territory, despite desperate Japanese resistance.

On June 6, 1944, supported by an immense naval armada, Allied troops launch an amphibious invasion of Normandy, France. The first on the beaches were the "storm troops": French commandos, U.S. Rangers, British Marines backed up by Canadian and U.S. paratroopers. At "Zero Hour", the strategic and tactical air attacks combine to provide cover for the invasion forces. Although facing a fierce resistance by Nazi forces, the Allied armies, established a beachhead on the Normandy coast, and move inland in a combined infantry and armour attack.

== Cast ==
- Adolf Hitler as himself (archival footage)
- Neville Chamberlain as himself (archival footage)

== Production ==
Zero Hour was the part of the wartime Canada Carries On and The World in Action propaganda short film series, produced with financial backing from the Wartime Information Board for the Director of Public Information, Herbert Lash. Typical of the NFB's series of morale-boosting films, Zero Hour used the format of a compilation documentary, relying heavily on combat footage and newsreel material, including "enemy" footage, in order to provide the background to the dialogue. (Note: Enemy footage was provided care of the Alien Property Custodian.).

The deep baritone voice of stage actor Lorne Greene was featured in the narration of Zero Hour. Greene, known for his work on both radio broadcasts as a news announcer at CBC as well as narrating many of the Canada Carries On series. His sonorous recitation led to his nickname, "The Voice of Canada", and to some observers, the "voice-of-God". When reading grim battle statistics or narrating a particularly serious topic, he was known as "The Voice of Doom".

== Reception ==
In early 1942, NFB head John Grierson through his Hollywood contacts, introduced the war-themed The World in Action series with the first documentary Warclouds in the Pacific being picked up by United Artists with additional titles to be distributed in the United States. With distribution already established in Canada and Great Britain, Grierson now added the United States market.

Zero Hour was produced in 35 mm for the theatrical market and shown in both the Canada Carries On and The World in Action series with each film shown over a six-month period as part of the shorts or newsreel segments in approximately 800 theatres across Canada. The NFB had an arrangement with Famous Players theatres to ensure that Canadians from coast-to-coast could see them, with further distribution by Columbia Pictures. After the six-month theatrical tour ended, individual films were made available on 16 mm to schools, libraries, churches and factories, extending the life of these films for another year or two. They were also made available to film libraries operated by university and provincial authorities. A total of 199 films were produced before the series was canceled in 1959.

== See also ==
- Pincer on Axis Europe (1943)
- The Gates of Italy (1943)
- Break-through (1944)
