= When Asia Speaks =

- Title Frame
- Directed by: Gordon Weisenborn
- Produced by: Stuart Legg
- Narrated by: Lorne Greene
- Music by: Lucio Agostini
- Production company: National Film Board of Canada
- Distributed by: United Artists; National Film Board of Canada
- Release date: June 3, 1944
- Running time: 19 minutes
- Country: Canada
- Language: English

When Asia Speaks is a 19-minute film produced in 1944 by Stuart Legg and directed by Gordon Weisenborn for the National Film Board of Canada series The World in Action. The film is narrated by broadcaster Lorne Greene. When Asia Speaks describes the disparity between the riches of Asia and the poverty of the masses during the Second World War that have led to nationalist movements in Asia. The film's French version title is Le Réveil de l'Asie.

== Synopsis ==
In 1944, during the Second World War, Allied forces are beginning to occupy Axis-occupied Asia. The vast area represents 1/2 of the world's population and unlimited natural resources.

Although the Empire of Japan in attempting to establish the Greater East Asia Co-Prosperity Sphere, had ruled the occupied Asian populations with a heavy hand for years, the Japanese government and military reversed its policies in an attempt to sway cooperation. At the same time, great forces are also at work in the Indian sub-continent, Indo-Asia Pacific and China as nationalist movements vie for self-determination.

An obstacle to ruling Asia is the wide divide between East and West. The administrators of the British Empire on the Indian sub-continent realize that Gandhi and Nehru speak for a massive disaffected populace. In China, the nationalist movement begun by visionary leader Sun Yat-sen has galvanized the occupied people in their struggle against Japan. Despite recruiting efforts to enlist the Asian population, except for isolated examples, Asians have rejected the Axis propaganda.

The great riches of the region are coveted by both the Axis and Allied powers. Although urban areas have made progress, and industries have employed millions, the impoverished people in rural areas still labour in the fields. With the end of World War II in sight, Asia looks forward to the day when they can fulfill their own hopes for a better future in a postwar world.

== Cast ==
- Franklin Delano Roosevelt as himself (archive footage)
- Mahatma Gandhi as himself (archive footage)
- Jawaharlal Nehru as himself (archive footage)
- Lord Wavell as himself (archive footage)
- Madame Chiang Kai-shek as herself (archive footage)
- Hideki Tojo as himself (archive footage)
- Sun Yat-sen as himself (archive footage)

== Production ==
Typical of the NFB's wartime series of propaganda short films, When Asia Speaks was a compilation documentary that relied heavily on stock footage, including "enemy footage". (Note: Enemy footage was provided care of the Alien Property Custodian.) A large proportion of the film was composed on newsreel material from the inter-war period, continuing to foster the outmoded image of "romance, glamour and intrigue" that characterized the westerner's perception of the East.

The narrator in When Asia Speaks was Lorne Greene, known for his work on both radio broadcasts as a news announcer at CBC as well as narrating many of the earlier Canada Carries On and The World in Action series. His sonorous recitation led to his nickname, "The Voice of Canada", and when reading grim battle statistics, "The Voice of Doom".

== Reception ==
When Asia Speaks as part of the NFB's The World in Action newsreel series, was produced in 35 mm for the theatrical market. Each film was shown over a six-month period as part of the shorts or newsreel segments in approximately 800 theatres across Canada. The NFB also had an arrangement with United Artists to ensure that newsreels would get a wider release in North America.

After the six-month theatrical tour ended, individual films were made available on 16 mm, to schools, libraries, churches and factories, extending the life of these films for another year or two. They were also made available to film libraries operated by university and provincial authorities. Available from the National Film Board either online or as a DVD.

Film historian Ian Aitken in The Concise Routledge Encyclopedia of the Documentary Film, described When Asia Speaks as "... so accurate and farseeing in its analysis that it was still in active non-theatrical distribution long after the war."

== See also ==
- Warclouds in the Pacific (1941)
- Inside Fighting China (1942)
- List of artistic depictions of Mahatma Gandhi
