= The War for Men's Minds =

- Title frame
- Written by: Stuart Legg
- Produced by: Stuart Legg
- Narrated by: Lorne Greene
- Edited by: Stuart Legg
- Music by: Lucio Agostini
- Production company: National Film Board of Canada
- Distributed by: National Film Board of Canada; United Artists
- Release date: 1943
- Running time: 21 minutes, 39 seconds
- Country: Canada
- Language: English

The War for Men's Minds is a 21-minute 1943 Canadian documentary film, made by the National Film Board of Canada (NFB) as part of the wartime The World in Action series. The film was produced by Stuart Legg. The film describes the impact of propaganda from the Axis powers in 1943, during the Second World War. The French version title is À la conquête de l'esprit humain.

== Synopsis ==
In 1943, Allied forces are confronting a sophisticated means of war, the propaganda campaign that the Axis powers employ. In Italy, the Fascist regime led by Benito Mussolini made use of propaganda, including pageantry and fiery speeches, to inspire the nation and lead the populace to war.

The Nazi Party in the years leading up to and during Adolf Hitler's leadership of Germany also used propaganda to gain widespread support for Nazi policies and later, to maintain power. Both Hitler and Joseph Goebbels, the head of the Ministry of Public Enlightenment and Propaganda were skillful masters of propaganda.

The Nazi Party's manipulation of all forms of media from newspaper, books and films became omnipresent and extended beyond Germany. The filmmaker Leni Riefenstahl created two epic propaganda films, Der Sieg des Glaubens or Victory of Faith (1933) and Triumph des Willens or Triumph of the Will (1935) that depicted the fervent Nazi multitudes in the 1930s Nuremberg Rallies

Despite President Franklin D. Roosevelt's passionate address in his 1941 State of the Union speech, articulating the Four Freedoms (Freedom of speech, Freedom of worship, Freedom from want and Freedom from fear), a homegrown German American Bund was formed, espousing Nazi values. By the time they entered the global conflict, Americans rejected the politics of fear and hate.

Through the efforts of information bureaux and traditional media sources such as newspapers, radio and newsreel films, the Allies have attempted to counter the Axis propaganda. The universal principles of liberty, equality and fraternity along with the four freedoms have become the basis of the fight in which the Allied nations are engaged. The war on information and propaganda fronts, and the hopes for the future, are also founded on co-operation and common purpose of all the democracies.

== Cast ==
- Benito Mussolini as himself (archival footage)
- Adolf Hitler as himself (archival footage)
- Joseph Goebbels as himself (archival footage)
- Hermann Göring as himself (archival footage)
- Rudolf Hess as himself (archival footage)
- Fritz Julius Kuhn as himself (archival footage)
- Franklin D. Roosevelt as himself (archival footage)
- Winston Churchill as himself (archival footage)
- Josef Stalin as himself (archival footage)
- Charles de Gaulle as himself (archival footage)
- William Lyon Mackenzie King as himself (archival footage)
- Matthew Halton as himself (archival footage)

== Production ==
The War for Men's Minds was the part of the wartime The World in Action propaganda short film series. The films were produced with financial backing from the Wartime Information Board for the Director of Public Information, Herbert Lash.

Typical of the NFB's series of morale-boosting films, The War for Men's Minds used the format of a compilation documentary, relying heavily on newsreel material, including "enemy" footage, in order to provide the background to the dialogue. (Note: Enemy footage was provided care of the Alien Property Custodian.).

The striking images of cheering crowds in Nazi Germany that were featured in Leni Riefenstahl's films were used extensively. The American Hollywood filmmaker Frank Capra also used scenes from her films, which he described partially as "the ominous prelude of Hitler's holocaust of hate", in many parts of the U.S. government's Why We Fight anti-Axis seven-film series, to demonstrate what the personnel of the American military would be facing in the Second World War, and why the Axis had to be defeated.

The deep baritone voice of the stage actor Lorne Greene was used in the narration of The War for Men's Minds. Greene was known for his work on radio broadcasts as a news announcer at CBC as well as narrating many of the Canada Carries On series. His sonorous recitation led to his nickname, "The Voice of Canada", and to some observers, the "voice-of-God". When reading grim battle statistics or narrating a particularly serious topic, he was known as "The Voice of Doom".

== Reception ==
In early 1942, NFB's head, John Grierson, through his Hollywood contacts, found a new outlet for NFB documentaries, especially his recently launched war-themed The World in Action series. After the success of selling Warclouds in the Pacific, the NFB was able to make a further arrangement with United Artists for additional titles to be distributed in the United States. With distribution in Canada and Great Britain, he now added the United States market.

The War for Men's Minds was produced in 35 mm for the theatrical market. Each film in the wartime The World in Action and Canada Carries On series was shown over a six-month period as part of the shorts or newsreel segments in approximately 800 theatres across Canada. The NFB had an arrangement with Famous Players theatres to ensure that Canadians from coast-to-coast could see them, with further distribution by Columbia Pictures.

After the six-month theatrical tour ended, individual films were made available on 16 mm to schools, libraries, churches and factories, extending the life of these films for another year or two. They were also made available to film libraries operated by university and provincial authorities. Continuing into the postwar era, a total of 199 films were produced in The World in Action series before it was canceled in 1959.
