= Heroes of the Atlantic =

- Screenshot of title frame
- Directed by: J.D. Davidson
- Written by: Stuart Legg; Graham McInnes
- Produced by: Stanley Hawes
- Narrated by: Lorne Greene
- Cinematography: J.D. Davidson
- Music by: Lucio Agostini
- Production company: National Film Board of Canada (Note: Still known at the time as the Canadian Government Motion Picture Bureau.)
- Distributed by: Columbia Pictures of Canada
- Release date: 1941
- Running time: 15 minutes
- Country: Canada
- Language: English

Heroes of the Atlantic is a 1941 15-minute Canadian short documentary film, part of the Canada Carries On series of wartime films by the National Film Board of Canada (NFB), produced for the Office of Public Information. The film documented the work of the Royal Canadian Navy and the Merchant Marine during the Battle of the Atlantic in the Second World War. Heroes of the Atlantic was directed by J.D. Davidson and produced by Stanley Hawes.

== Synopsis ==
In 1941, the Atlantic Ocean has become a strategic "highway" and lifeline from the New World to Great Britain. The numerous ships that ply the Atlantic sea lanes during wartime head for English ports where they unload their precious cargo of troops, munitions, food and supplies.

Canadian seamen play a vital role in the Battle of the Atlantic where the Merchant Marine works closely with the Royal Canadian Navy and other military forces. As the convoys steam out from ports along the Canadian eastern seaboard, Canadian Army coastal guns are trained out to sea, navy minesweepers clear the shipping channels and the Royal Canadian Air Force Supermarine Stranraer coastal patrol flying boats keep watch.

Ashore, sailors of every nationality have gathered to serve in both civilian and military roles. As cargo arrives from farms and factories in Canada, it has to be constantly loaded and sent off to English destination, a task that requires dock and loadmasters, cargo handlers and manual labourers. In naval training schools, young recruits are being prepared for action in the North Atlantic, learning about weapons, equipment and tactics that will keep the convoys safe on their perilous journeys.

Before heading out in their dangerous "caravan of the seas", seamen seek out entertainment and diversions. When convoys are formed up, a meeting of merchant and naval captains sets out the strategic plans that will thwart the roaming Nazi submarine (U-boat) "wolf packs".

The unsung heroes of the Atlantic keep up a relentless schedule of shipping that will ultimately mean the difference in the war.

== Production ==
Heroes of the Atlantic was created as a morale-boosting propaganda film, part of the wartime Canada Carries On series. The film was produced with financial backing from the Wartime Information Board and made in cooperation with the Director of Public Information, Herbert Lash. The format of Heroes of the Atlantic was as a compilation documentary with additional footage at sea and onshore in Halifax, Nova Scotia by director and cinematographer J.D. Davidson with assistant Donald Fraser. Sound technicians W.H. Lane and C.J. Quick were also involved in the on-location shooting. The earlier NFB documentary Atlantic Patrol (1940) had a similar theme and focus.

The narrator of Heroes of the Atlantic was Lorne Greene, known for his work on both radio broadcasts as a news announcer at CBC as well as narrating many of the Canada Carries On series. His sonorous recitation led to his nickname, "The Voice of Canada", and to some observers, the "voice-of-God". When reading grim battle statistics or as in Atlantic Patrol, narrating a particularly serious topic such as Canadian seaman at war, he was "The Voice of Doom".

== Reception ==
Heroes of the Atlantic was produced in 35 mm for the theatrical market and was shown in theatres in Canada and overseas. Each film was shown over a six-month period as part of the shorts or newsreel segments in approximately 800 theatres across Canada.

The NFB had an arrangement with Famous Players theatres to ensure that Canadians from coast-to-coast could see the documentary series, with further distribution by Columbia Pictures. After the six-month theatrical tour ended, individual films were made available on 16 mm to schools, libraries, churches and factories, extending the life of these films for another year or two. They were also made available to film libraries operated by university and provincial authorities.
