= The Children from Overseas =

- Opening title
- Directed by: Ruby Grierson; Stanley Hawes
- Produced by: Stuart Legg
- Starring: Vincent Massey
- Narrated by: Lorne Greene
- Cinematography: Roy Tash; J.D. Davidson
- Music by: Lucio Agostini
- Production company: National Film Board of Canada (NFB) (Note: The NFB was still known at the time as the Canadian Government Motion Picture Bureau.)
- Distributed by: Columbia Pictures of Canada
- Release date: 1940
- Running time: 10 minutes, 18 seconds
- Country: Canada
- Language: English

The Children from Overseas (Les Jeunes Réfugiés) is a 10-minute 1940 Canadian documentary film, made by the National Film Board of Canada (NFB) as part of its Canada Carries On series.

It is an account of Britain's evacuee children who were sent to Canada during the Second World War. The film was directed by Ruby Grierson and Stanley Hawes and produced by Stuart Legg.

== Synopsis ==
In 1940, during the Blitz, with London and other urban centres in England under constant nightly bombardment. parents have to make a momentous decision to protect their children. While anti-aircraft guns fire at the raiders, families seek shelter in air-raid shelters, ever fearful of being bombed. When Canada offers to take refugees, the first 1,500 children to be evacuated to Canada come from London, Dover, Portsmouth and the industrial north, all locations where German air raids are taking place.

Still ahead of them, the children faced a perilous ocean voyage through Nazi U-boat-invested waters. (Note: City of Benares was torpedoed on September 17, 1940, with 77 of the 90 evacuated children aboard, killed.) Once they safely reached Canada's shores, the children began to discover the sights and sounds of their new home. A train trip still awaited most of the children before they could meet their foster families.

Some of the new experiences, at first, were strange and exciting – seeing a Mountie, attending school and meeting new classmates, even the simple sight of a city bathed in lights after a year of blackouts. In a country not facing widespread rationing, the evacuated children have discovered corn-on-the-cob, hot dogs, Coca-Cola and a rich, new kind of ice cream. Snow on a wintery day is a new experience but the children find that celebrating Christmas is much the same, even 3,000 miles away from their homes.

Using a transatlantic radio connection, the evacuated children are able to share their new adventures with their parents in England.

== Cast ==
- Canadian High Commissioner in London Vincent Massey as Himself (archival footage)

== Production ==
Typical of the NFB's Second World War documentary short films in the Canada Carries On series, Children from Overseas was made in cooperation with the Director of Public Information, Herbert Lash. The film was created as a morale boosting propaganda film.

Children from Overseas was a compilation documentary edited to provide a coherent story, that relied on newsreel material as well additional footage shot for the film by cinematographers Roy Tash and J.D. Davidson, with on-location sound recording by technicians William H. Lane and C.J. Quick.

The deep baritone voice of stage actor Lorne Greene was featured in the narration of Children from Overseas. Greene, known for his work on both radio broadcasts as a news announcer at CBC as well as narrating many of the Canada Carries On series. His sonorous recitation led to his nickname, "The Voice of Canada", and to some observers, the "voice-of-God". When reading grim battle statistics or narrating a particularly serious topic, he was known as "The Voice of Doom".

== Reception ==
Children from Overseas was produced in 35 mm for the theatrical market. Each film was shown over a six-month period as part of the shorts or newsreel segments in approximately 800 theatres across Canada. The NFB had an arrangement with Famous Players theatres to ensure that Canadians from coast-to-coast could see them, with further distribution by Columbia Pictures.

After the six-month theatrical tour ended, individual films were made available on 16 mm to schools, libraries, churches and factories, extending the life of these films for another year or two. They were also made available to film libraries operated by university and provincial authorities. A total of 199 films were produced before the series was canceled in 1959.

== See also ==
- The Home Front (1940), a NFB documentary on the Canadian home front in the Second World War
