= Inside Fighting Russia =

- Screenshot of film frame
- Written by: James Beveridge
- Produced by: Stuart Legg
- Narrated by: Lorne Greene
- Edited by: James Beveridge
- Production company: National Film Board of Canada
- Distributed by: United Artists
- Release date: 1942
- Running time: 22 minutes
- Country: Canada
- Language: English

Inside Fighting Russia (aka Our Russian Ally) is a 1942 22-minute Canadian short documentary film produced by the National Film Board of Canada (NFB) for distribution by United Artists, as part of the wartime The World in Action series. (Note: With Inside Fighting Canada and Inside Fighting China, Inside Fighting Russia was part of a NFB trilogy with a similar theme.) The film documents Russia's fight against Nazi Germany during the Second World War. Inside Fighting Russia is produced by Stuart Legg, and narrated by Lorne Greene. The film's French version title is La Russie sous les armes.

== Synopsis ==
In 1942, during the Second World War, the Union of Soviet Socialist Republics, led by Joseph Stalin faced a formidable foe in Nazi Germany. Hitler's armoured legions attacked without warning, penetrating deep into the Soviet Union but were met by a fierce resistance. From ordinary citizens to the military that had to withstand the enemy attacks, the indomitable spirit of Russia began to change the course of the war.

With the Soviet Union now a major member of the Allied war effort, millions of Russians bolstered by their faith and courage, are thrown into the caldron of war. Factory workers, farmers in their fields, educators and students in their schools, doctors in their hospitals, all symbolized the country's utilization of its cooperative energy to fight fascism. Workers in Canada and Great Britain demonstrated their solidarity with their Russian allies with street rallies in Montreal and London.

The vast resources of labor and materials were mobilized by the Communist leadership. Since the 1920s and 1930s, with great sacrifices made by the working class and peasants, the Soviet Union had been transformed through a series of Five-Year Plans, into the world's second greatest industrial power. Turning to war factories in Siberia, far from the front lines, workers turned out tanks and aircraft, the new weapons of a mechanized war.

With Moscow almost in sight, the furious Soviet counterattacks slowed and then stopped the advancing Nazi forces. In the coming months, the Soviet military leaders planned to throw back the invading Nazi armada and regain lost territories.

== Cast ==
- Adolf Hitler as himself (archive footage)
- Vyacheslav Molotov as himself (archive footage)
- Joseph Stalin as himself (archive footage)

== Production ==
Typical of the NFB's Second World War documentary short films in The World in Action series, Inside Fighting Russia was made in cooperation with the Director of Public Information, Herbert Lash. The film was created as a morale boosting propaganda film. Inside Fighting Rusia was a compilation documentary edited by James Beveridge to provide a coherent story. The film relied heavily on newsreel material from the Soviet Union, and represented a "coup" for the filmmakers, as Soviet newsreels were difficult to obtain.

The deep baritone voice of stage actor Lorne Greene was featured in the narration of Inside Fighting Russia. Greene, known for his work on both radio broadcasts as a news announcer at CBC as well as narrating many of the Canada Carries On series. His sonorous recitation led to his nickname, "The Voice of Canada", and to some observers, the "voice-of-God". When reading grim battle statistics or narrating a particularly serious topic, he was known as "The Voice of Doom".

== Reception ==
In early 1942, NFB head John Grierson went to Hollywood to establish a new market for NFB documentaries, especially the war-themed The World in Action series which had been recently inaugurated. He met with Charlie Chaplin and Mary Pickford of United Artists (UA) and was able to strike a deal to distribute the first 12 films of the series in the United States. He already had an agreement to distribute NFB films throughout Canada and Great Britain. Grierson and the NFB also had an agreement with the producers, Louis de Rochemont and his brother Richard de Rochemont of The March of Time newsreels.

Inside Fighting Russia, the very first film in The World in Action series to be distributed, "... ran into trouble immediately. UA would not distribute it in the United States as they considered it to be Communist propaganda." In a similar move, the province of Quebec through the Bureau de censure du Québec banned the film, along with Our Northern Neighbour, another NFB documentary that covered the same subject.

After this abortive start, the film series started appearing in theatres about once a month. "They would screen in 6,000 cinemas stateside and 1,000 in Great Britain, being seen by 3 million people in the United States alone. In Canada 23 copies in English would be released to theatres with a further two copies going out in French. These would circulate for about six months throughout the country."

Inside Fighting Russia was produced in 35 mm for the theatrical market. To ensure that Canadians from coast-to-coast could see them, each film was shown over a six-month period as part of the shorts or newsreel segments in approximately 800 theatres across Canada. After the success of Warclouds in the Pacific, the NFB was able to make a further arrangement with United Artists for additional titles to be distributed in the United States.

When the six-month theatrical tour ended, individual films were made available on 16 mm to schools, libraries, churches and factories, extending the life of these films for another year or two. They were also made available to film libraries operated by university and provincial authorities. A total of 199 films were produced before the series was canceled in 1959.

Historian Malek Khouri, in analyzing Inside Fighting Russia and the role of propaganda in the NFB wartime documentaries, said. "During the early years of the NFB, its creative output was largely informed by the turbulent political and social climate the world was facing. World War II, Communism, unemployment, the role of labour unions, and working conditions were all subjects featured by the NFB during the period from 1939 to 1946".

Film historian Ian Aitken described Inside Fighting Russia as "... While well-intentioned, the film lays it on a bit thick as to the strength and power of the Soviet people. The view presented of the communist system is naively oversimplified. While the USA and Soviets were fighting a common enemy, America’s mistrust of communism could not be dispelled so easily."
