= Wings of a Continent =

- Screenshot of title frame
- Directed by: Raymond Spottiswoode
- Written by: Stuart Legg
- Produced by: Stuart Legg
- Narrated by: Lorne Greene
- Cinematography: Roger Barlow
- Music by: Lucio Agostini
- Production company: National Film Board of Canada
- Distributed by: Columbia Pictures of Canada
- Release date: December 17, 1941
- Running time: 16 minutes
- Country: Canada
- Language: English

Wings of a Continent is a 1941 Canadian short documentary film, part of the wartime Canada Carries On series of short films by the National Film Board of Canada, produced for the Office of Public Information. The film was directed by Raymond Spottiswoode—father of filmmaker Roger Spottiswoode—written and produced by Stuart Legg and narrated by Lorne Greene.

== Synopsis ==
Commercial air transportation in Canada began with bush pilots pioneering air routes in the north and Arctic. A new industry was born and within a few years, the air carriers serving the Canadian north became the largest carriers of airborne cargo in the world. Small bush companies eventually grew into modern airlines, the largest becoming the Trans-Canada Air Lines, offering transcontinental service.

Airlines like Trans-Canada Air Lines operate with the complexity and precision of a well-run machine, relying of the work and effort of every employee, from technicians and mechanics on the ground, the operators at the weather station to the pilot at the controls; each individual plays an important role. With the coming of the Second World War, the airlines in Canada took on a new role.

The strategic use of air transportation in Canada during wartime in connecting the far-flung industries and military stations, is significant. They are the link between the continents flying the great ocean clipper routes across the Atlantic and the Pacific. Canada's air services also serve to unite the battle front in Europe and the battle front in the Pacific.

Planning for a postwar world, Canada's airlines could make use of the wartime supply routes that were established across the globe.

== Production ==
Wings of a Continent was part of the Canada Carries On series, produced with financial backing from the Wartime Information Board, and was released shortly after the United States went to war. The documentary was created as a morale boosting propaganda film during the Second World War.

The narrator of Wings of a Continent was Lorne Greene, known for his work on both radio broadcasts as a news announcer at CBC as well as narrating many of the Canada Carries On series. His sonorous recitation led to his nickname, "The Voice of Canada", and to some observers, the "voice-of-God". When reading grim battle statistics or as in Wings of a Continent, narrating a particularly serious topic such as Canada going to war, he was "The Voice of Doom".

== Reception ==
As part of the Canada Carries On series, Wings of a Continent was produced in 35 mm for the theatrical market and also released as Les Ailes d'un Continent, a version dubbed in French. Each film was shown over a six-month period as part of the shorts or newsreel segments in approximately 800 theatres across Canada. When shown in Ottawa, the reviewer commented that, "The strategic significance of air transportation in Canada in a world now totally at war is graphically described in the December release of the National Film Board's 'Wings of a Continent'." Along with others in the Canada Carries On series, Wings of a Continent received widespread circulation.

The NFB had an arrangement with Famous Players theatres to ensure that Canadians from coast-to-coast could see the documentary series, with further distribution by Columbia Pictures. After the six-month theatrical tour ended, individual films were made available on 16 mm to schools, libraries, churches and factories, extending the life of these films for another year or two. They were also made available to film libraries operated by university and provincial authorities.
