= The Front of Steel =

- Opening title
- Directed by: John McDougall
- Written by: D'Arcy Marsh
- Produced by: Stuart Legg
- Narrated by: Lorne Greene
- Cinematography: Alfred Jacquemin; Roy Tash
- Music by: Lucio Agostini
- Production company: National Film Board of Canada
- Distributed by: Columbia Pictures of Canada
- Release date: 1940
- Running time: 11 minutes
- Country: Canada
- Language: English

The Front of Steel (Le front d'acier) is an 11-minute 1940 Canadian documentary film, made by the National Film Board of Canada (NFB) as part of the wartime Canada Carries On series. The film, directed by John McDougall and produced by Stuart Legg, is an account of the value of steel in war production in Canada during the Second World War.

== Synopsis ==
In 1940, Canadian heavy industry is converting to a war footing, with a new "front of steel" confronting the Axis powers, led by Nazi Germany. Steel is the weapon of war used by the nation that had chosen "guns before butter" and unleashed its lightning blitzkrieg attacks on Europe.

The Allied nations realized that only steel could challenge steel, and in the United Kingdom and Canada, industrial workers responded with total energy and efficiency. On the home front, industrial production soared with factories converting to munitions in 100 Canadian cities and towns, with committed Canadians entering the workforce in large numbers.

Precision and standardization allowed for rapid production of steel products. As the epitome of a new mechanized steel weapon, the light and simple to use Bren gun was manufactured in Canada in a complex operation that involved 2,800 smaller processes employing 18,000 tools and jigs. Steel is also used in thin sheets to create the submarine chasers coming from Canadian shipyards, in the trucks, armour and ambulances rolling out of factories that were formerly manufacturing automotive products, even in steel ball bearings, critical parts for mechanized warfare.

On the "front of steel", it is "soldiers in dungarees" that will make the difference between winning and losing in modern warfare and Canada is playing its part.

== Cast ==
- Hermann Göring as Himself (archive footage)
- Adolf Hitler as Himself (archive footage)
- Wilhelm Keitel as Himself (archive footage)
- Joe Gilchuck, welder as Himself
- Jim McLaren, foundry man, as Himself
- Matt Johnson, sheet worker as Himself
- Louis Gagnion, master rivetter, as Himself

== Production ==
Typical of the NFB's Second World War documentary short films in the Canada Carries On series, The Front of Steel was made in cooperation with the Director of Public Information, Herbert Lash. The film was created as a morale boosting propaganda film.

The Front of Steel was a compilation documentary edited to provide a coherent story, that relied heavily on newsreel material, including "enemy" footage, in order to provide the background to the dialogue. (Note: Enemy footage was provided care of the Alien Property Custodian.). Additional footage was shot for the film by cinematographers Alfred Jacquemin and Roy Tash, with on-location sound recording by technicians Maurice Metzger and Walter Darling. The unusual use of intertitles similar to those used in silent film, overlaid over film images, provided onscreen dialogue for the audience.

The deep baritone voice of stage actor Lorne Greene was featured in the narration of The Front of Steel. Greene was known for his work on both radio broadcasts as a news announcer at CBC as well as narrating many of the Canada Carries On series. His sonorous recitation led to his nickname, "The Voice of Canada", and to some observers, the "voice-of-God". When reading grim battle statistics or narrating a particularly serious topic, he was known as "The Voice of Doom".

== Reception ==
The Front of Steel was produced in 35 mm for the theatrical market. Each film was shown over a six-month period as part of the shorts or newsreel segments in approximately 800 theatres across Canada. The NFB had an arrangement with Famous Players theatres to ensure that Canadians from coast-to-coast could see them, with further distribution by Columbia Pictures.

After the six-month theatrical tour ended, individual films were made available on 16 mm to schools, libraries, churches and factories, extending the life of these films for another year or two. They were also made available to film libraries operated by university and provincial authorities. A total of 199 films were produced before the series was canceled in 1959.

== See also ==
- The Home Front (1940), a NFB documentary on the role of women on the home front in the Second World War
- Rosies of the North (1999), a NFB documentary on the Canadian Car and Foundry in the Second World War
- Women Are Warriors (1942), a NFB documentary on Canadian women in military service and in the home front during the Second World War
