= Soldiers All =

- Title Frame
- Directed by: Stuart Legg
- Produced by: Stuart Legg
- Narrated by: Lorne Greene
- Music by: Lucio Agostini
- Production companies: National Film Board of Canada; Associated Screen Studios (Montreal)
- Distributed by: Columbia Pictures of Canada
- Release date: August 27, 1941
- Running time: 20 minutes
- Country: Canada
- Language: English

Soldiers All is a 20-minute 1941 Canadian documentary film, made by the National Film Board of Canada as part of the wartime Canada Carries On series. The film was directed and produced by Stuart Legg. Soldiers All describes the experiences in 1941 of soldiers, airmen and sailors in Great Britain and Canada during wartime. The film's French version title is Frères d'armes.

== Synopsis ==
In 1941, during the Second World War, 125,00 Canadians in uniform are in Great Britain as part of the Allied cause. Joining the military already in England, the 3rd Canadian Division in the largest convoy sailing from Canada, protected by Royal Canadian Navy (RCN) corvettes and destroyers, has reached British shores.

The Canadian presence in a nation at war takes on many forms. In London, where over 10,000 Canadians live and work despite the nightly blitz by Luftwaffe bombers, Londoners wake up and are greeted by a mobile canteen provided by McGill University in Montreal. At Canada House, the home of the High Commission of Canada in London, officials undertake consular, public affairs, political, trade and administrative functions. Each day, transatlantic cables are received and decoded at Canada House that set out the "orders-of-the-day".

In intense training, the Canadian Active Force conducts joint artillery and infantry exercises that will ready the force for an offensive role overseas. Working with British regulars and militia, Canadian troops learn to use new weapons, such as the "Tommy gun".

After having tallied nearly 100 Luftwaffe aircraft shot down in the Battle of Britain, Royal Canadian Air Force (RCAF) Hawker Hurricane fighter aircraft from No. 401 Squadron RCAF, based at RAF Croydon are on patrol over British skies. RCAF Armstrong Whitworth Whitley bombers are also taking the fight to the enemy as part of the RAF Bomber Command's night bombing campaign aimed at the heart of Axis-held Europe.

Troops from the Canadian Army billeted locally are learning to adjust to a cultural divide, that is tempered by the kindness and warmth of their British hosts. In return for their hospitality, the townspeople are invited to a show, "Sultan Saturday Night, a dire drama of the Middle East" put on by Canadian soldiers, where ribald acts relieve the tensions of a populace at war. (Note: A male Canadian soldier performed "in drag" in what was considered risqué but acceptable in contemporary mores.) Other soldiers take part in messages that are relayed home from a broadcasting station in London.

Back in Canada, the advanced training of cadet officers at the Royal Military College (RMC), Kingston, Ontario are vital to Canada's development of a strong fighting force. Akin to the British Army's initial officer training centre at Sandhurst and West Point in the United States, the RMC provides not only a thorough curriculum but also stresses leadership qualities for the next generation of military leaders.

Another major contribution to the Allied war effort was in setting up the British Commonwealth Air Training Plan (BCATP) where training of the "boys down under", Australian and New Zealand airmen is taking place in Canada. The massive military aircrew training program created by the United Kingdom, Canada, Australia and New Zealand, was one of the single largest aviation training programs in history, responsible for training nearly half the pilots, navigators, bomb aimers, air gunners, wireless operators and flight engineers in Commonwealth service.

== Cast ==
- King George VI as himself (archival footage)
- Queen Elizabeth The Queen Mother as herself (archival footage)
- Princess Patricia as herself (archival footage)
- Governor General arl of Athlone as himself (archival footage)
- Prime Minister of Australia Robert Menzies as himself (archival footage)
- Canadian High Commissioner in London Vincent Massey as himself (archival footage)
- Georges Vanier as himself (archival footage)
- General A.G.L. McNaughton as himself (archival footage)
- General Victor Odlum as himself (archival footage)
- CBC correspondent Robert "Bob" Bowman as himself (archival footage)
- CBC sound technician Art Holmes as himself (archival footage)
- RCAF Sergeant-plot Robert Moulton as himself (archival footage)
- RCAF Flight Lieutenant Robert Benjamin Moulton as himself (archival footage)
- RCAF radio operator Enid Combay as herself (archival footage)

== Production ==
Soldiers All was the part of the Canada Carries On series, produced with financial backing from the Wartime Information Board, in partnership with Audio Pictures Limited, which acted as a co-producer. The documentary was created as a morale boosting propaganda film during the Second World War.

Typical of the NFB's Canada Carries On series of morale-boosting propaganda short films, Soldiers All was made in cooperation with the Director of Public Information, Herbert Lash. Using the format of John Grierson's "creative treatment of actuality" as well as that of a compilation documentary, the film relied heavily on the work of the Associated Screen Studios, based in Montreal.

The deep baritone voice of stage actor Lorne Greene was featured in the narration of Soldiers All. Greene, known for his work on both radio broadcasts as a news announcer at CBC as well as narrating many of the Canada Carries On series. His sonorous recitation led to his nickname, "The Voice of Canada", and to some observers, the "voice-of-God". When reading grim battle statistics or narrating a particularly serious topic, he was known as "The Voice of Doom".

== Reception ==
As part of the Canada Carries On series, Soldiers All was produced in 35 mm for the theatrical market. Each film was shown over a six-month period as part of the shorts or newsreel segments in approximately 800 theatres across Canada. The NFB had an arrangement with Famous Players theatres to ensure that Canadians from coast-to-coast could see them, with further distribution by Columbia Pictures.

After the six-month theatrical tour ended, individual films were made available on 16 mm to schools, libraries, churches and factories, extending the life of these films for another year or two. They were also made available to film libraries operated by university and provincial authorities. A total of 199 films were produced before the series was canceled in 1959.
