= The Gates of Italy =

- Title Frame
- Directed by: Stuart Legg; Tom Daly
- Written by: Stuart Legg; Tom Daly
- Produced by: Stuart Legg; Tom Daly
- Narrated by: Lorne Greene
- Edited by: Stuart Legg; Tom Daly
- Music by: Lucio Agostini
- Production company: National Film Board of Canada
- Distributed by: National Film Board of Canada; United Artists; Columbia Pictures of Canada
- Release date: 1943
- Running time: 21 minutes
- Country: Canada
- Language: English

The Gates of Italy is a 21-minute 1943 Canadian documentary film, made by the National Film Board of Canada as part of both the wartime Canada Carries On and The World in Action series. The film was written, directed and produced by Stuart Legg and Tom Daly. The Gates of Italy describes the last days of Benito Mussolini's rule over Italy in 1943 during the Second World War.

== Synopsis ==
In 1943, Allied forces are being assembled for an assault on Axis-held Italy. This military expedition marks the end of a troubled era for Italy during the 20th Century. Despite its origins as an early civilization and nearly 3,000 years of advances in arts and culture, Italians have faced an uncertain future.

During the turn-of-the-century, impoverished Italians left their homeland to settle in the United States and Canada, making their mark in many ways, including as scientists, artists and sports figures. In Italy, after the First World War, chaotic economies led to the rise of fascism. The emergence of Benito Mussolini as the new political and military dictator thrust Italy into a series of foreign entanglements, in an attempt to reinvigorate the nation.

After invasion and conquest of Ethiopia, Mussolini aligned with Adolf Hitler in a campaign of aggression in the Mediterranean and North Africa during the Second World War.

By 1943, Italian defeats in Africa with the resulting massive numbers of captured troops by Allied forces, have been characterized as the "African disease". Naval and aerial armadas massing for an attack on Italy, mean the end for Mussolini's deluded dreams of a new Italian empire.

== Cast ==
- Benito Mussolini as himself (archival footage)
- Bruno Mussolini as himself (archival footage)
- Rachele Mussolini as herself (archival footage)
- Pope Pius XII as himself (archival footage)
- Victor Emmanuel III as himself (archival footage)
- Adolf Hitler as himself (archival footage)
- Joseph Goebbels as himself (archival footage)
- Galeazzo Ciano as himself (archival footage)
- General Pietro Badoglio as himself (archival footage)
- Joe DiMaggio as himself (archival footage)
- Tony Canzoneri as himself (archival footage)
- Arturo Toscanini as himself (archival footage)
- Joachim von Ribbentrop as himself (archival footage)
- Governor General arl of Athlone as himself (archival footage)
- Calvin Coolidge as himself (archival footage)

== Production ==
The Gates of Italy was the part of the wartime Canada Carries On and The World in Action propaganda short film series, produced with financial backing from the Wartime Information Board for the Director of Public Information, Herbert Lash.

Typical of the NFB's series of morale-boosting films, The Gates of Italy used the format of a compilation documentary, relying heavily on newsreel material, including "enemy" footage, in order to provide the background to the dialogue. (Note: Enemy footage was provided care of the Alien Property Custodian.).

The deep baritone voice of stage actor Lorne Greene was featured in the narration of The Gates of Italy. Greene, known for his work on both radio broadcasts as a news announcer at CBC as well as narrating many of the Canada Carries On series. His sonorous recitation led to his nickname, "The Voice of Canada", and to some observers, the "voice-of-God". When reading grim battle statistics or narrating a particularly serious topic, he was known as "The Voice of Doom".

== Reception ==
In early 1942, National Film Board of Canada head John Grierson through his Hollywood contacts, found a new outlet for documentaries, especially the recently launched war-themed The World in Action series. After the success of selling Warclouds in the Pacific, the National Film Board of Canada was able to make a further arrangement with United Artists for additional titles to be distributed in the United States. With distribution in Canada and Great Britain, he now added the United States market.

The Gates of Italy was produced in 35 mm for the theatrical market. Each film in both The World in Action and Canada Carries On series was shown over a six-month period as part of the shorts or newsreel segments in approximately 800 theatres across Canada. The National Film Board of Canada had an arrangement with Famous Players theatres to ensure that Canadians from coast-to-coast could see them, with further distribution by Columbia Pictures. After the six-month theatrical tour ended, individual films were made available on 16 mm to schools, libraries, churches and factories, extending the life of these films for another year or two. They were also made available to film libraries operated by university and provincial authorities. A total of 199 films were produced before the series was canceled in 1959.
