= Wings of Youth (1940 film) =

- Screenshot: Title frame
- Directed by: Raymond Spottiswoode
- Written by: Graham McInnes
- Produced by: Stuart Legg
- Starring: Billy Bishop
- Narrated by: Lorne Greene
- Cinematography: Roger Barlow
- Music by: Lucio Agostini
- Production companies: National Film Board of Canada; Audio Pictures (Toronto)
- Distributed by: National Film Board of Canada; Columbia Pictures
- Release date: 1940
- Running time: 19 minutes
- Country: Canada
- Language: English

Wings of Youth (Notre jeunesse ailée) is a 1940 Canadian short documentary film, part of the Canada Carries On series of short films by the National Film Board of Canada. The film was directed by Raymond Spottiswoode, produced by Stuart Legg and narrated by Lorne Greene.

== Synopsis ==
During the First World War, Canadian aviators made their mark as combat pilots. After the war, many of them became part of the Royal Canadian Air Force, taking on peacetime roles of mapping the frontiers and forest fire patrols. Bush pilots built a system of commercial flying that led to Trans-Canada Air Lines, a transcontinental airline. When war came again, veterans took on the task of training a new generation of aviators in the Commonwealth Air Training Plan.

While youth sign up and begin training, the Commonwealth Air Training Plan bases are being constructed across the country. In Canadian aircraft factories, training aircraft such as the North American Harvard are being manufactured to add to those sent from Great Britain, including the Fairey Battle and Avro Anson. To train for the modern aerial combat environment, pilots undergo a rigorous ground training program that includes classroom work, high altitude chambers and Link Trainer simulation sessions. After initial flying training, the successful candidates complete a solo flight in the Canadian designed and built Fleet Finch trainer, before going on to advanced flight training.

Other air crew learn how to navigate, drop armament and fire weapons in other simulated training programs. Mechanics also have to learn all the skills required to repair and maintain an aircraft. When pilots, ground crew and air crew trainees have completed their training, they receive their "wings" at a special graduation ceremony often presided over by high ranking RCAF officers, such as Air Marshal Billy Bishop.

== Cast ==
- Billy Bishop
- Fidel Carrière, trainee
- Wilf Matthews, trainee
- Jack Linnes, trainee
- Harry Briggio, trainee

== Production ==
Wings of Youth was part of the Canada Carries On series, produced with financial backing from the Wartime Information Board in partnership with Audio Pictures Limited, which acted as a co-producer. The documentary was created as a morale boosting propaganda film during the Second World War. Wings of Youth was selected as the title after Wings over Canada and Wings of Empire were rejected.

The narrator of Wings of Youth was Lorne Greene, known for his work on both radio broadcasts as a news announcer at CBC as well as narrating many of the Canada Carries On series. His sonorous recitation led to his nickname, "The Voice of Canada", and to some observers, the "voice-of-God". When reading grim battle statistics or as in Warclouds in the Pacific, narrating a particularly serious topic such as Canada going to war, he was "The Voice of Doom".

== Reception ==
As part of the Canada Carries On series, Wings of Youth was produced in 35 mm for the theatrical market. Each film was shown over a six-month period as part of the shorts or newsreel segments in approximately 800 theatres across Canada. Along with others in the Canada Carries On series, Wings of Youth received widespread circulation.

The NFB had an arrangement with Famous Players theatres to ensure that Canadians from coast-to-coast could see the documentary series, with further distribution by Columbia Pictures. After the six-month theatrical tour ended, individual films were made available on 16 mm to schools, libraries, churches and factories, extending the life of these films for another year or two. They were also made available to film libraries operated by university and provincial authorities.

== Works cited ==
- McInnes, Graham (2004). One Man's Documentary: A Memoir of the Early Years of the National Film Board. University of Manitoba Press. ISBN 9780887553516.

== Bibliography ==
- Aitken, Iann. The Concise Routledge Encyclopedia of the Documentary Film. London: Routledge, 2013. ISBN 978-0-4155-9642-8.
- Bennett, Linda Greene. My Father's Voice: The Biography of Lorne Greene. Bloomington, Indiana: iUniverse, Inc., 2004. ISBN 978-0-595-33283-0.
- Ellis, Jack C. and Betsy A. McLane. New History of Documentary Film. London: Continuum International Publishing Group, 2005. ISBN 0-8264-1750-7.
- Rist, Peter. Guide to the Cinema(s) of Canada. Westport, Connecticut: Greenwood Publishing Group, 2001. ISBN 978-0-3132-9931-5.
