= Stuart Legg =

British documentary filmmaker (1910–1988)

- Stuart Legg c. 1943
- Born: Francis Stuart Legg; 31 August 1910; London, England
- Died: 23 July 1988 (aged 77); Wiltshire, England
- Education: St John's College, Cambridge
- Occupations: Director, Producer, Editor, Writer
- Known for: Filmmaking, Writing
- Spouse: Margaret Amos
- Awards: Academy Award for Documentary Short Subject

Stuart Legg (31 August 1910 – 23 July 1988) was a pioneering English documentary filmmaker. At the 14th Academy Awards in 1941, Legg's National Film Board of Canada film Churchill's Island became the first-ever documentary to win an Oscar. Also in contention for Best Documentary that year was Legg's film Warclouds in the Pacific.

== Biography ==
Francis Stuart Legg was one of three children born to Ethel Green Legg and Arthur Legg, a solicitor. He attended Marlborough College and St John's College, Cambridge, where he read the mechanical sciences (engineering) tripos. While at Cambridge, he made Varsity (1930) with the university's Film Society, which was followed two years later by Cambridge, produced with "some involvement" from British Instructional Films. Following graduation, Legg was hired as an assistant to director Walter Creighton at Publicity Films. For Creighton, he made two films, and met John Grierson, who would become his mentor and life-long friend and colleague.

Grierson had recently returned from studying in the U.S., where he had become very active in the film world. He saw a lack of public engagement and knowledge of events as contributing to threats to democracy, and saw documentary films as an art-form which could also keep the public informed and involved. He founded the Documentary Film Movement, and recruited several young filmmakers, including Legg. At the time, Grierson was a films officer at the Empire Marketing Board, a government agency which had been formed to encourage trade and national unity. Legg's first film for Grierson was The New Generation (1932), which was said to "exemplify an attempt at the Russian technique." In 1933, the Empire Marketing Board was dissolved and the film unit was moved to the General Post Office. Legg would stay with the GPO Film Unit until 1937, when he replaced Paul Rotha as head of the Strand Film Company. At this time, he was commissioned, by the British Film Council, to write the report Money Behind the Screen.

In 1938, the government of Canada invited Grierson to examine the country's film production system. In 1939, he was invited back and became the first Commissioner of the National Film Board. He brought Legg to Canada to make two films whose purpose was to promote the Dominion-Provincial Youth Training Program. The films, The Case of Charlie Gordon and Youth Is Tomorrow, are regarded as milestones in the development of a mature, socially responsible documentary movement in Canada.

Legg decided to stay in Canada, and became Director of Production for the Canadian Government Motion Picture Bureau. In this role, he was responsible for the training of filmmakers; when the Bureau and the NFB merged in 1941, he was responsible for 55 filmmakers; a year later, it was 293.

With Canada at war, Legg's propagandist style was a perfect fit for the morale-boosting films that the NFB wanted to produce; he was given control of the theatrical shorts program, which included two series: Canada Carries On and The World in Action. Records are incomplete but it is thought that, from 1941 to 1945, he produced and directed most of the films in these series; he is credited with 46. His assistant and researcher was Tom Daly, who would become the NFB's most prolific producer. (Note: Legg's close working relationship with Grierson led others to think of him merely as the NFB founder's assistant.)

The World in Action, which began in 1942, appeared each month in 800 Canadian theatres, reaching 4 million viewers; in the U.S., it screened in 6,500 theatres and reached millions. At the end of the war, it was cancelled but Grierson felt that it was commercially viable. He resigned from the NFB and convinced Legg to join him in New York, where he was able to reach a production deal with Universal Pictures. Grierson's reputation was temporarily damaged when he was caught up in the Gouzenko Affair and accused of being a spy; the deal with Universal was cancelled and, in 1946, Legg returned to England.

In 1940 the GPO Film Unit had become the Crown Film Unit and Legg spent three years there as a producer. In 1952, the British government dissolved the Crown Film Unit and Legg became chairman of Film Centre International, a production coordination company which Grierson had founded in 1937. Through Film Centre, Legg produced films for Gaumont-British Instructional and the Shell Film Unit. Records are incomplete, but it is thought that, between 1952 and 1962, he also produced promotional films for Shell-Mex and BP, Imperial Airways, Anglo-Scottish Pictures and the Australian National Film Board. He retired in 1962.

== Writing ==
After retiring from filmmaking, Legg published four books: Trafalgar : An Eye-Witness Account of a Great Battle (1966), Jutland: An Eye-witness Account of a Great Battle (1967), The Heartland (1970, dedicated to Grierson and re-issued in 1991 as The Barbarians of Asia), and The Railway Book: An Anthology (1988).

== Personal life and death ==
Legg was married to Margaret Amos (1910–2002), daughter of Sir Percy Maurice Amos. They lived at Shooter's Hill, London and had a farm in Lamberhurst, Kent, which may have been Legg's studio. They had four children, including Sir Thomas Legg. Legg died in Wiltshire in 1988.

== Filmography ==
First Films

- Aunt Matilda's Nephew – short film, Cambridge University Film Society 1929 – director
- Varsity – short film, Cambridge University Film Society 1930 – director
- Power – short film, Cambridge University Film Society 1930 – director
- Windjammer – feature, Gaumont-British Instructional, John Orton, 1930 – assistant director
- Cambridge – short film, Gaumont-British Instructional 1931 – director

GPO Film Unit

- The New Generation – documentary short, Gaumont-British Instructional 1932 – director
- Cable Ship – documentary short, GPO Film Unit, Alexander Shaw 1933 – co-producer with John Grierson
- Telephone Workers – documentary short, GPO Film Unit 1933 – director
- Pett and Pott – short film, GPO Film Unit, Alberto Cavalcanti 1934 – co-associate director with Basil Wright, co-writer with Alberto Cavalcanti
- Conquering Space: The Story of Modern Communication – documentary short, GPO Film Unit 1934 – producer and director
- The New Operator – training film, GPO Film Unit 1934 – director
- Savings Bank – documentary short, GPO Film Unit 1934 – director
- C.T.O. – The Story of the Central Telegraph Office – documentary short, GPO Film Unit 1935 – producer
- The Coming of the Dial – documentary short, GPO Film Unit 1935 – co-director with Alexander Shaw
- Coal Face – documentary short, GPO Film Unit 1935 – cinematographer
- Yugoslavia – documentary short, GPO Film Unit 1935 – director
- BBC: The Voice of Britain – documentary, GPO Film Unit 1935 – writer, co-producer, director
- Daisy Bell Comes to Town – documentary short, Gaumont-British Instructional, J.B. Holmes 1937 – producer
- Roadways – documentary short, GPO Film Unit, 1937 – co-director with William Coldstream

Strand Film Company

- Eastern Valley – documentary short, Strand Film Company, 1937 – producer
- Today We Live – documentary short, Strand Film Company, Ruby Grierson & Ralph Bond 1937 – writer
- Watch and Ward in the Air – documentary short, Strand Film Company, Ralph Keene 1937 – producer
- Children’s Story – documentary short, Strand Film Company, Alexander Shaw 1938 – producer
- Animal Legends – documentary, Animal Kingdom Series, Strand Film Company, Alexander Shaw 1938 – producer
- Monkey into Man – documentary, Animal Kingdom Series, Strand Film Company, Donald Alexander, Stanley Hawes & Evelyn Spice Cherry 1938 – producer
- Mites and Monsters – documentary, Animal Kingdom Series, Strand Film Company, Donald Alexander 1938 – producer
- Behind the Scenes – documentary short, Animal Kingdom Series, Strand Film Company, Evelyn Spice Cherry 1938 – producer
- Fingers and Thumbs – documentary short, Animal Kingdom Series, Strand Film Company, Evelyn Spice Cherry 1938 – producer
- Birth of the Year, or Spring at the Zoo – documentary short, Animal Kingdom Series, Strand Film Company, Evelyn Spice Cherry 1938 – producer
- Free to Roam – documentary short, Animal Kingdom Series, Strand Film Company 1938 – producer, and co-director with Paul Burnford
- Zoo Babies – documentary short, Animal Kingdom Series, Strand Film Company, Evelyn Spice Cherry 1938 – producer
- The Zoo and You – documentary short, Animal Kingdom Series, Strand Film Company, Ruby Grierson 1938 – producer
- The Duchy of Cornwall – documentary short, Strand Film Company, Bill Pollard 1938 – producer
- Wealth of a Nation – documentary short, Strand Film Company, Bill Pollard 1938 – producer
- Wings Over Empire – documentary short, Strand Film Company 1938 – director
- Land of the White Rhino – documentary short, Strand Film Company, Ruby Grierson and Donald Alexander 1939 – producer
- Animals on Guard – documentary short, Strand Film Company, Ruby Grierson and Donald Alexander 1939 – producer
- Animal Geography – documentary short, Strand Film Company, Ruby Grierson and Donald Alexander 1939 – producer

National Film Board of Canada

- The Case of Charlie Gordon – documentary short 1939 – writer, director
- Youth is Tomorrow – documentary short 1939 – writer, director
- Atlantic Patrol – documentary short 1940 – writer, editor, producer, director
- Toilers of the Grand Banks – documentary short 1940 – producer, director
- Letter from Camp Borden – documentary short, Raymond Spottiswoode 1940 – producer
- Wings of Youth – documentary short, Raymond Spottiswoode 1940 – producer
- Letter from Aldershot – documentary short, John Taylor 1940 – producer
- The Front of Steel – documentary short, John McDougall 1940 – producer
- ''Children from Overseas – documentary short, Ruby Grierson & Stanley Hawes 1940 – producer
- Churchill's Island – documentary short 1941 – writer, editor, producer, director
- Battle of Brains – documentary short, Stanley Hawes 1941 – producer
- Food – Weapon of Conquest – documentary short 1941 – writer, editor, producer, director
- Warclouds in the Pacific – documentary short 1941 – writer, editor, producer, director
- Soldiers All – documentary short 1941 – producer, director
- Strategy of Metals – documentary short, Raymond Spottiswoode 1941 – writer, editor, producer
- Wings of a Continent – documentary short, Raymond Spottiswoode 1941 – writer, producer
- Everywhere in the World – documentary short 1941 – producer, director
- Heroes of the Atlantic – documentary short, J.D. Davidson 1941 – writer
- Inside Fighting China – documentary short 1942 – writer, editor, producer, director
- The Mask of Nippon – documentary short, Margaret Palmer 1942 – writer, producer
- Invasion of North Africa – documentary short, Strand Film Company 1942 – co-director with Stanley Hawes
- Ferry Pilot – documentary short 1942 – director and, with Ross McLean, co-producer
- Great Lakes – documentary short, Radford Crawley & Donald Fraser 1942 – executive producer
- Inside Fighting Russia – documentary short 1942 – producer, director
- This is Blitz – documentary short 1942 – writer, editor, producer, director
- The Battle for Oil – documentary short 1942 – writer, editor, director
- Geopolitik: Hitler's Plan for Empire – documentary short 1942 – writer, editor, producer, director
- Battle Is Their Birthright – documentary short 1943 – writer, editor, producer, director
- Fighting Dutch – documentary short, Raymond Spottiswoode 1943 – producer
- The Gates of Italy – documentary short, 1943 – writer, editor, director and, with Tom Daly, co-producer
- The War for Men's Minds – documentary 1943 – writer, editor, producer, director
- Battle of Europe – documentary short 1944 – writer, editor, director and, with Tom Daly, co-producer
- Zero Hour – documentary short 1944 – producer, director
- Balkan Powder Keg – documentary short 1944 – writer, editor, producer, director
- Future for Fighters – documentary short 1944 – writer James Beveridge, co-director, co-producer
- When Asia Speaks – documentary short, Gordon Weisenborn 1944 – writer, editor, producer
- Fortress Japan – documentary short 1944 – writer, editor, producer, director
- Our Northern Neighbour – documentary short, Tom Daly 1944 – producer
- Inside France – documentary short 1944 – writer, editor, producer, co-director, with Tom Daly
- Global Air Routes – documentary short 1944 – writer, editor, producer, director
- Food: Secret of the Peace – documentary short 1945 – writer, editor, producer, director
- Spotlight on the Balkans – documentary short 1945 – producer, director
- Maps in Action – documentary short 1945 – producer, director
- John Bull's Own Island – documentary short 1945 – writer, editor, producer, director
- Now — The Peace – documentary short 1945 – writer, editor, producer, director
- Tomorrow's Citizens – documentary short, Gordon Weisenborn 1947 – writer, producer

Crown Film Unit

- From the Ground Up – documentary short, Crown Film Unit, 1950 – producer
- Men of the World – documentary short, Crown Film Unit, Ronald Clark 1950 – producer
- Eagles of the Fleet – documentary short, Crown Film Unit, Cyril Frankel 1950 – producer
- Underwater Story – documentary short Crown Film Unit, Cyril Frankel 1950 – producer, co-writer with Cyril Frankel
- Spotlight on the Colonies – documentary short, Crown Film Unit, Diana Pine 1950 – producer
- Forward a Century – documentary short, Crown Film Unit, Napier Bell 1951 – producer
- Operation Hurricane – documentary short, Crown Film Unit, Ronald Stark 1952 – producer

Film Centre International

- Plan for Coal – documentary short 1953 – producer
- Powered Flight: The Story of the Century – documentary, 1953 – director
- Focus on India – documentary short, Gaumont-British Instructional 1953 – writer, director
- Focus on Pakistan – documentary short, Gaumont-British Instructional 1953 – writer, director
- Focus on Flying Boats – documentary short, Gaumont-British Instructional 1954 – writer, director
- Golden Reef – documentary short, Worldwide Pictures, Julian Spiro 1956 – producer
- The Rival World aka Strijd Zonder Einde – documentary short, Shell Film Unit, Bert Haanstra 1955 – producer
- Song of the Clouds – documentary short, John Armstrong, Shell Film Unit 1957 – producer
- Food or Famine – documentary short, Shell Film Unit, co-producer and -director with Martha Varley and A. Bailey 1962

== Legacy ==
Legg's film Churchill's Island was preserved by the Academy Film Archive in 2005.
