= The Battle of Brains =

- Opening title
- Directed by: Stanley Hawes
- Produced by: Stuart Legg
- Narrated by: Lorne Greene
- Cinematography: J.B. Scott
- Edited by: Milton Shifman
- Music by: Godfrey Ridout
- Production company: National Film Board of Canada
- Distributed by: Columbia Pictures of Canada
- Release date: 1941
- Running time: 13 minutes
- Country: Canada
- Language: English

The Battle of Brains is a 13-minute 1941 Canadian documentary film, made by the National Film Board of Canada (NFB) as part of the wartime Canada Carries On series. The film, directed by Stanley Hawes and produced by Stuart Legg, contrasted modern warfare with the First World War. The film's French version title is Sur le front scientifique.

== Synopsis ==
During the First World War, campaigns were frozen into inaction, mired in a trench warfare stalemate that lasted years. During the Second World War, the lessons of the last war were not learned as France built a supposedly "impregnable" Maginot Line. In 1940, the static Maginot fortifications were easily outflanked by Nazi Germany's rapid mechanized legions.

In modern mechanized ground warfare, both Great Britain and Canada learned the principles of tactical warfare and applied them in training and in battle. In Africa, Empire armoured units were successful in traversing large expanses of the Sahara Desert, successfully launching surprise attacks against Axis forces.

War has not only become a battle of "men and machines" but also of "brains". In Canada, scientists at the National Research Council (NRC), university and industrial laboratories are in the forefront of research. The close relationship of science and warfare is evident when Andrew McNaughton, the former head of the NRC, becomes the commanding officer of the First Canadian Infantry Division (part of VII Corps).

Canadian scientists and technicians use wind tunnels to design aircraft, decompression chambers to help pilots cope with battle at high altitudes, X-rays to test forgings, and create precise measuring instruments to ensure that cannon barrels are made to exacting standards. Science has also been harnessed to create other potent weapons of war such as aircraft and submarines. New technology has been introduced to make weapons more effective including the use of radio direction finders and degaussing apparatus on ships to protect against magnetic mines and torpedoes.

With scientists and military tacticians working together, weapons of war have now become more effective and proved the value of "the battle of brains".

== Cast ==
- General Andrew McNaughton

== Production ==
Typical of the NFB's Second World War documentary short films in the Canada Carries On series, The Battle of Brains was made in cooperation with the Director of Public Information, Herbert Lash. The film was created as a morale boosting propaganda film. The Battle of Brains was a compilation documentary that relied heavily on newsreel material including "enemy" footage, in order to provide the background to the dialogue. (Note: Enemy footage was provided care of the Alien Property Custodian.) Additional on location photography at Canadian aircraft and munitions factories came from Stuart Legg.

The deep baritone voice of stage actor Lorne Greene was featured in the narration of The Battle of Brains. Greene was known for his work on both radio broadcasts as a news announcer at CBC as well as narrating many of the Canada Carries On series. His sonorous recitation led to his nickname, "The Voice of Canada", and to some observers, the "voice-of-God". When reading grim battle statistics or narrating a particularly serious topic, he was known as "The Voice of Doom".

== Reception ==
The Battle of Brains was produced in 35 mm for the theatrical market. Each film was shown over a six-month period as part of the shorts or newsreel segments in approximately 800 theatres across Canada. The NFB had an arrangement with Famous Players theatres to ensure that Canadians from coast-to-coast could see them, with further distribution by Columbia Pictures.

After the six-month theatrical tour ended, individual films were made available on 16 mm to schools, libraries, churches and factories, extending the life of these films for another year or two. They were also made available to film libraries operated by university and provincial authorities. A total of 199 films were produced before the series was canceled in 1959.

== See also ==
- The Home Front (1940), a NFB documentary on the role of women on the home front in the Second World War
- Rosies of the North (1999), a NFB documentary on the Canadian Car and Foundry in the Second World War
