= Wings of Youth =

Wings of Youth may refer to:

- Wings of Youth (1925 film), an American drama film
- Wings of Youth (1940 film), a Canadian short documentary film
- Wings of Youth (1949 film), a Spanish drama film
