= Our Northern Neighbour =

- Theatrical film poster created by artist Harry Mayerovitch
- Directed by: Tom Daly
- Written by: Tom Daly
- Produced by: Stuart Legg
- Narrated by: Lorne Greene
- Cinematography: Norman McLean (animation)
- Edited by: Tom Daly
- Music by: Lucio Agostini
- Production company: National Film Board of Canada
- Distributed by: United Artists; National Film Board of Canada
- Release date: 1944
- Running time: 21 minutes
- Country: Canada
- Language: English

Our Northern Neighbour is a film produced in 1944 by Stuart Legg and directed by Tom Daly for the National Film Board of Canada series The World in Action. The film is narrated by broadcaster Lorne Greene.

== Synopsis ==
In 1943, during the Second World War, three great powers come together at the Tehran Conference to decide the state of the Allied war effort. One of the three powers that has emerged as a key player is the Union of Soviet Socialist Republics, led by Joseph Stalin. The effectiveness of their Allied cooperation depends heavily on the United States and the United Kingdom having an understanding of the nature and history of their other partner, the Soviet Union.

In First World War, after the October Revolution of November 1917, Communist Party leader Vladimir Lenin overthrew the last Russian Tsar, Nicholas II. The Soviet Union was subsequently officially established in December 1922. After Lenin's death in 1924, Stalin emerged as the new leader. Throughout the 1920s and 1930s, with great sacrifices made by the working class and peasants, the Soviet Union was transformed into the world's second greatest industrial power.

In the later 1930s, faced with the prospect of war with Germany, Stalin signed a non-aggression pact, but Soviet factories turned out armour, aircraft and ships, building up their defences. In 1941, despite their binding treaty, Nazi forces attacked the Soviet Union but were met by a fierce resistance. With sweeping gains leading them right to the capital city, Moscow, Nazi armies were stalled by an unusually harsh winter and met their first defeat at the Battle of Stalingrad.

With the end of the war in sight, the ordinary Soviet citizen is now envisioning the work ahead. First, after years of destruction, will come rebuilding cities, town and industries. Next, with the prospect of a different society in the Soviet Union, a new peaceful world will also have to be rebuilt.

== Cast ==
- Franklin Delano Roosevelt
- Joseph Stalin
- Winston Churchill
- Vladimir Lenin
- Leon Trotsky
- Adolf Hitler

== Production ==
Typical of the NFB's wartime series of documentary short films, Our Northern Neighbour relied heavily on stock footage, including "enemy footage". (Note: Enemy footage was provided care of the Alien Property Custodian.)

The narrator in Our Northern Neighbour was Lorne Greene, known for his work on both radio broadcasts as a news announcer at CBC as well as narrating many of the earlier Canada Carries On series. His sonorous recitation led to his nickname, "The Voice of Canada", and when reading grim battle statistics, "The Voice of Doom".

== Reception ==
Our Northern Neighbour, as part of the NFB's The World in Action newsreel series, was produced for both the military and the theatrical market. According to the National Film Board's official history, "The most remarkable films in the series are 'Inside Fighting Russia', 'The War for Men's Minds' and 'Balkan Powder Keg', all three directed by Stuart Legg, and 'Our Northern Neighbour' by Tom Daly."

Each film was shown over a six-month period as part of the shorts or newsreel segments in approximately 800 theatres across Canada. The NFB also had an arrangement with United Artists to ensure that newsreels would get a wider release in North America.

After the six-month theatrical tour ended, individual films were made available on 16 mm, to schools, libraries, churches and factories, extending the life of these films for another year or two. They were also made available to film libraries operated by university and provincial authorities. Available from the National Film Board either online or as a DVD.

An accompanying film, "Getting the Most Out of a Film" explored issues in the film and also provided some commentary and feedback from the audience. Drummond Wren, the General Secretary of The Workers' Educational Association of Canada (WEA) started the discussion.

Historian Malek Khouri analyzed the role of the NFB wartime documentaries with Our Northern Neighbour characterized as a propaganda film, especially directed at countering the wartime criticisms of the Soviet Union. "During the early years of the NFB, its creative output was largely informed by the turbulent political and social climate the world was facing. World War II, Communism, unemployment, the role of labour unions, and working conditions were all subjects featured by the NFB during the period from 1939 to 1946".
