= Atlantic Patrol =

1940 film

- Screenshot of title frame
- Directed by: Stuart Legg
- Written by: Stuart Legg
- Produced by: Stuart Legg; F. C. Badgley (Note: F. C. Badgley was credited as a supervisor.)
- Narrated by: Lorne Greene
- Cinematography: Frank C. Follette; Ernest R. Wilson
- Edited by: Stuart Legg
- Music by: Lucio Agostini
- Production company: National Film Board of Canada
- Distributed by: Columbia Pictures of Canada
- Release date: 1940
- Running time: 10 minutes
- Country: Canada
- Language: English

Atlantic Patrol is a 1940 Canadian short documentary film, part of the Canada Carries On series of short films by the National Film Board of Canada, (Note: Still known at the time as the Canadian Government Motion Picture Bureau.) produced for the Office of Public Information.

The film documents the role of the Canadian Merchant Navy and the convoys that brought troops, munitions and supplies to Great Britain during the Battle of the Atlantic in World War II. Atlantic Patrol was directed and written by Stuart Legg and narrated by Lorne Greene.

== Synopsis ==
In 1940, the Atlantic Ocean has become a strategic "highway" from the New World to Great Britain. The numerous ships that ply the Atlantic sea lanes during World War II head for nameless English ports where they unload their precious cargo of troops, war matérial and supplies. Canadian seamen play a vital role in the lifeline for England.

From Canadian factories to docks, the endless supply of war materiel is carried aboard freighters that are marshalled into convoys protected by Royal Canadian Navy (RCN) destroyers. Royal Canadian Air Force Supermarine Stranraer seaplanes provide the first aerial protection but once the convoy is out to sea, the RCN destroyers are in charge.

The unseen enemy that the convoys face are the U-boats that wait for any stragglers from the convoy. When an alarm is sounded that enemy U-boats are thought to be nearby, the destroyers launch high-explosive depth charges and charge ahead at full speed, reaching 37 knots, turning back the threat. Once the convoy reaches its destination in England, the Canadian destroyers quickly turn around and head back to their home ports to escort a new convoy, heading for England.

== Production ==
Atlantic Patrol was part of the Canada Carries On series, produced with the financial backing from the Wartime Information Board. The documentary was created as a morale boosting propaganda film during World War II.

The narrator of Atlantic Patrol was Lorne Greene, known for his work on both radio broadcasts as a news announcer at CBC as well as narrating many of the Canada Carries On series. His sonorous recitation led to his nickname, "The Voice of Canada", and to some observers, the "voice-of-God". When reading grim battle statistics or as in Atlantic Patrol, narrating a particularly serious topic such as Canadian seaman at war, he was "The Voice of Doom".

== Reception ==
The first of the Canada Carries On series, Atlantic Patrol was produced in 35 mm for the theatrical market and was the first short documentary shown in theatres. Each film was shown over a six-month period as part of the shorts or newsreel segments in approximately 800 theatres across Canada. Along with others in the Canada Carries On series, Atlantic Patrol received widespread circulation.

The NFB had an arrangement with Famous Players theatres to ensure that Canadians from coast-to-coast could see the documentary series, with further distribution by Columbia Pictures. After the six-month theatrical tour ended, individual films were made available on 16 mm to schools, libraries, churches and factories, extending the life of these films for another year or two. They were also made available to film libraries operated by university and provincial authorities.
