= Ferry Pilot (1942 film) =

- Screenshot of the title frame
- Written by: Stuart Legg
- Produced by: Stuart Legg; Ross McLean
- Narrated by: Lorne Greene
- Production company: National Film Board of Canada
- Distributed by: United Artists; National Film Board of Canada
- Release date: 1942
- Running time: 19 minutes
- Country: Canada
- Language: English

Ferry Pilot is a film produced in 1942 by Stuart Legg and Ross McLean for the National Film Board of Canada series The World in Action, in cooperation with the United Kingdom Ministry of Information and the Crown Film Unit. The film has an unaccredited narration by broadcaster Lorne Greene.

== Synopsis ==
During the Second World War, the importance of Allied strategic bombing of military targets meant that heavy bombers had to be available. The Air Transport Auxiliary (ATA) was a British wartime civilian organization, headquartered at White Waltham Airfield, Berkshire, England that ferried new, repaired and damaged military aircraft between factories, assembly plants, transatlantic delivery points, Maintenance Units (MUs), scrap yards to active service squadrons and airfields. The Royal Air Force (RAF) also created a special unit, the RAF Ferry Command, to meet the needs of delivering aircraft from aircraft factories in North America to RAF operational squadrons in a timely manner.

Across the Atlantic, aircraft factories in Canada, acting as shadow factories for the British war effort, also relied on ferry pilots to deliver aircraft over the long transatlantic route to the United Kingdom. Along with RAF personnel, former bush pilots and commercial aviators formed the basis of the pool of ferry pilots that flew from Canada. Ferry missions as regular as five times a month, set out from bases such as Dorval Airport in Montreal and Gander Airport, Gander, Newfoundland as part of the "air bridge" to Europe.

== Production ==
Typical of the NFB's wartime series of documentary short films, Ferry Pilot relied heavily on stock footage, including "enemy footage". (Note: Enemy footage was provided care of the Alien Property Custodian.)

The narrator in Now — The Peace was Lorne Greene, known for his work on both radio broadcasts as a news announcer at CBC as well as narrating many of the earlier Canada Carries On series. His sonorous recitation led to his nickname, "The Voice of Canada", and when reading grim battle statistics, "The Voice of Doom".

== Reception ==
Ferry Pilot as part of the NFB's The World in Action newsreel series, was produced for both the military and the theatrical market. Each film was shown over a six-month period as part of the shorts or newsreel segments in approximately 800 theatres across Canada. The NFB also had an arrangement with United Artists to ensure that newsreels would get a wider release in North America.

After the six-month theatrical tour ended, individual films were made available on 16 mm, to schools, libraries, churches and factories, extending the life of these films for another year or two. They were also made available to film libraries operated by university and provincial authorities. Available from the National Film Board either online or as a DVD.

Historian Malek Khouri analyzed the role of the NFB wartime documentaries with Ferry Pilot characterized as a propaganda film. "During the early years of the NFB, its creative output was largely informed by the turbulent political and social climate the world was facing. World War II, Communism, unemployment, the role of labour unions, and working conditions were all subjects featured by the NFB during the period from 1939 to 1946".
