= The Battle for Oil =

1942 film

- Title Frame
- Directed by: Stuart Legg
- Produced by: Raymond Spottiswoode
- Narrated by: Lorne Greene
- Cinematography: Radford Crawley; Donald Fraser
- Edited by: Stuart Legg
- Music by: Lucio Agostini
- Production company: National Film Board of Canada
- Distributed by: Columbia Pictures of Canada
- Release date: September 1942
- Running time: 19 minutes
- Country: Canada
- Language: English

The Battle for Oil (aka Battle for Oil) is a 19-minute 1942 Canadian documentary film, made by the National Film Board of Canada (NFB) as part of the wartime Canada Carries On series. The film was produced by Raymond Spottiswoode and directed and edited by Stuart Legg.The Battle for Oil describes the strategic value of oil in modern warfare. The film's French version title was La Bataille du pétrole.

== Synopsis ==
In 1942, consumers on the North American home front have to contend with sacrifices made in order to support the war effort. One of the restrictions is on the use of petroleum and lubricants, which results in commuters being rigidly constricted in their use of privately owned vehicles.

These wartime rations of oil will allow the Aliies to preserve one of the most important strategic materials. From the great oilfields of Texas, Mexico, Venezuela and the Caribbean basin, comes the oil that feeds the Allied war effort. Military forces are deployed to protect this vital resource. The Royal Navy warships range far out to sea protect the convoys that are lifelines to the Allied cause, but are highly reliant on the oil reserves located throughout the world. (Note: During the years leading up to the First World War, British warships converted from coal to oil.)

The mechanized Nazi war machine also relies on oil, and with limited natural supplies, Germany must manufacture costly synthetic fuels produced in 25 plants on a nonstop schedule that are constantly subjected to Royal Air Force aerial attacks. In distant battlefields, oil is the prize with Nazi armies threatening the rich oilfields of Baku, with the Soviet Union desperately fighting to retain the region. The German High Command knows that the Wehrmacht can stall if oil reserves are not secured.

In the Middle East, where the world's largest oil deposits are found, other oil wells and refineries are also under threat by the advancing Axis powers. The pipelines to Haifa and Tripoli and the storage tanks in Palestine where British and Soviet forces are standing guard, are under constant bombardment.

In the Far East, Japan, also dependent on foreign oil, is advancing relentlessly on the oil reserves in the Dutch East Indies and India. Singapore has become the fortress which the British Empire relies on to face the imminent onslaught of Japanese forces.

As the Allies turn to offence, oil is the lifeblood of the war effort. When the German battleship Bismarck makes a break for open sea, the oil-fuelled British battleships and destroyers run down and destroy the German battleship. Nightly RAF air raids also begin to take effect, but for every bombing raid to Berlin, 3,800 tons of high-test fuel is needed for each heavy bomber.

Global oil production continues with a new discovery in the Turner Valley oilfields in Alberta becoming significant with 1/6 of the oil in Canada coming from the new oilfield. The construction of the Portland–Montreal Pipeline from Portland, Maine to Montreal refineries brings oil to Eastern Canada where ocean-going oil tankers will then set off in escorted convoys dodging the formidable German U-boats to deliver the precious oil to the European battlefront.

== Cast ==
- J. H. J. Van Hook as himself (archival footage)
- Harold L. Ickes as himself (archival footage)
- Robert Brooke-Popham as himself (archival footage)
- Reza Khan as himself (archival footage)
- Mohammad Reza Pahlavi as himself (archival footage)

== Production ==
Typical of the NFB's Canada Carries On series of documentary short films, The Battle for Oil was a morale-boosting propaganda film made in cooperation with the Director of Public Information, Herbert Lash. Using the format of a compilation documentary, the film, edited by Stuart Legg to provide a coherent story, relied heavily on newsreel material including "enemy" footage, in order to provide the background to the dialogue. (Note: Enemy footage was provided care of the Alien Property Custodian.) A NFB film crew was also dispatched to the Turner Valley oilfields in Canada.

The deep baritone voice of stage actor Lorne Greene was featured in the narration of The Battle for Oil. Greene, known for his work on both radio broadcasts as a news announcer at CBC as well as narrating many of the Canada Carries On series. His sonorous recitation led to his nickname, "The Voice of Canada", and to some observers, the "voice-of-God". When reading grim battle statistics or narrating a particularly serious topic, he was known as "The Voice of Doom".

== Reception ==
As part of the Canada Carries On series, The Battle for Oil was produced in 35 mm for the theatrical market. Each film was shown over a six-month period as part of the shorts or newsreel segments in approximately 800 theatres across Canada. The NFB had an arrangement with Famous Players theatres to ensure that Canadians from coast-to-coast could see them, with further distribution by Columbia Pictures.

After the six-month theatrical tour ended, individual films were made available on 16 mm to schools, libraries, churches and factories, extending the life of these films for another year or two. They were also made available to film libraries operated by university and provincial authorities. A total of 199 films were produced before the series was canceled in 1959.

In a contemporary review of The Battle for Oil, the Educational Film Library Association notes: "... the strategic value of oil in the present conflict is emphasized until it appears as the greatest asset any nation can possess in these days of long-range warfare." The review also describes the effective use of images, stating the oil derricks make "... a vivid impression ... riding like a defiant crown against the western sky."

The subject of oil was later profiled in a number of NFB documentaries including The Story of Oil (1946), Struggle for Oil (1951) and Oil (1953) as well as many other more recent productions.
