= Everywhere in the World =

- Screenshot of the title frame
- Directed by: Stuart Legg
- Written by: David Cooper
- Produced by: Stuart Legg
- Narrated by: Lorne Greene
- Edited by: David Cooper
- Music by: Lucio Agostini
- Production company: National Film Board of Canada
- Distributed by: Columbia Pictures of Canada
- Release date: 1941
- Running time: 16 minutes
- Country: Canada
- Language: English

Everywhere in the World is a 16-minute 1941 Canadian documentary film about the contributions of the United States and Commonwealth countries to the Allied war effort. The film was made by the National Film Board of Canada (NFB) as part of the wartime Canada Carries On series. It was produced by Stuart Legg. The film's French version title was Partout au monde.

== Synopsis ==
During his 1941 State of the Union address, President Franklin D. Roosevelt articulated the Four Freedoms: Freedom of speech, Freedom of worship, Freedom from want and Freedom from fear that people "everywhere in the world" ought to enjoy. These freedoms have become the basis of the fight in which the Allied nations are engaged.

With the fall of France in 1940, it is Great Britain and the Commonwealth nations that stand up against the Axis powers and their attack on freedoms throughout the world. A number of victories on the high seas with the defeat of the Graf Spee, in the desert and Far East have shown that Great Britain still has the reserves and military forces to fight a global war.

For Great Britain to survive, the sea lanes have to be kept open, with precious cargoes of troops, war materiél and food being brought by merchant shipping. British naval and air forces are deployed to far off ports and stations such as Gibraltar, Malta, Singapore and Hong Kong to protect the vital sea lanes. Southern Rhodesia, South Africa, New Zealand and Australia mobilize for a war that has not yet reached their borders, but commit to proving Great Britain with supplies.

Canada has also become an integral part of the fight against the Axis, building up its defences, keeping the Atlantic sea routes free for shipping and providing food for the beleaguered Great Britain. The most important contribution is in establishing the training bases needed for the British Commonwealth Air Training Plan where airmen and airwomen from the Commonwealth will train.

Although the United States is neutral, a pledge from President Roosevelt to turn the nation into the "arsenal of democracy" will aid Great Britain. British orders for combat aircraft placed in American factories has resulted in 85% of aircraft production being built for the Royal Air Force (RAF). American aircraft are funneled through Canada before being shipped overseas.

With fear of a war to come, the United States has instituted compulsory military service with one and half million men being drafted. Armament and munitions factories also receive contracts to produce the weapons of war, with warships, tanks and aircraft constantly rolling off production lines to meet the requirements of a greatly increased military force.

== Cast ==
- Franklin Delano Roosevelt
- Charles Gavan Power
- Jan Smuts
- William S. Newton

== Production ==
Typical of the NFB's Canada Carries On series of documentary short films, Everywhere in the World incorporated stock footage with narration. The film was recorded in the Associated Screen Studios, Montreal. The documentary was emblematic of producer Stuart Legg's hard-hitting propaganda films.

Unlike many of the NFB information-based or "newsreel" productions. Everywhere in the World was more of an editorial on the non-intervention policy of the United States. The incorporation of President Roosevelt's Four Freedoms Speech established the rationale for the United States becoming more involved in the Allied war effort.

The narrator of Everywhere in the World was Lorne Greene, known for his work on both radio broadcasts as a news announcer at CBC as well as narrating many of the Canada Carries On series. His sonorous recitation led to his nickname, "The Voice of Canada", and to some observers, the "voice-of-God". When reading grim battle statistics or narrating a particularly serious topic such as the United States preparing for war, he was "The Voice of Doom".

== Reception ==
As part of the Canada Carries On series, Everywhere in the World was produced in 35 mm for the theatrical market. Each film was shown over a six-month period as part of the shorts or newsreel segments in approximately 800 theatres across Canada. The NFB had an arrangement with Famous Players theatres to ensure that Canadians from coast-to-coast could see them, with further distribution by Columbia Pictures.

After the six-month theatrical tour ended, individual films were made available on 16 mm to schools, libraries, churches and factories, extending the life of these films for another year or two. They were also made available to film libraries operated by university and provincial authorities. A total of 199 films were produced before the series was canceled in 1959.

Everywhere in the World was released online as part of an extensive digitization project undertaken by the NFB in 2009.
