= Now — The Peace =

Now – The Peace
- Screenshot of the title frame
- Directed by: Stuart Legg
- Written by: Stuart Legg
- Produced by: Stuart Legg
- Narrated by: Lorne Greene
- Production company: National Film Board of Canada
- Distributed by: United Artists; National Film Board of Canada
- Release date: 1945
- Running time: 20 minutes, 38 seconds
- Country: Canada
- Language: English

Now – The Peace is a film produced and directed in 1945 by Stuart Legg for the National Film Board of Canada series The World in Action, with unaccredited narration by Lorne Greene. Over its nearly 21-minute running time, circumstances during the immediate postwar period following the Second World War, leading to the formation of the United Nations are discussed.

== Synopsis ==
After the First World War, the League of Nations was created, but despite the efforts of leaders such as Woodrow Wilson, the organization failed to ensure world peace. The concept of collective security against attack was thought to be the means to stop wars. The constant conflicts of the 1930s with Japanese aggression in China, Italian invasion of Ethiopia and the beginning of the Spanish Civil War showed how ineffective the League had become.

During the Second World War, in an attempt to reinvigorate efforts directed to prevent future wars, the "five great powers" met in August and September 1944, at the Dumbarton Oaks Conference, Dumbarton Oaks, Washington, D.C. The deliberations led to the creation of a new international organization devoted to world peace, the United Nations. One of the aspects of the blueprint that is proposed is for nations to share their abundance of resources for mutual benefit. The United Nations Relief and Rehabilitation Administration (UNRRA) is created as an international relief agency to help nations in need during the immediate postwar era.

== Cast ==
- Woodrow Wilson
- Julio Alvarez del Vayo, Spanish Foreign Minister

== Production ==
Typical of the NFB's wartime and immediate postwar series of documentary short films, Now – The Peace relied heavily on stock footage, including "enemy footage". (Note: Enemy footage was provided care of the Alien Property Custodian.) The film was similar to Global Air Routes, as both films were described as "editorials" on screen. Part of the NFB's The World In Action series of documentary short films, Now – The Peace was intended to prepare Canadians for a postwar and was produced by the NFB at the suggestion of Archibald MacLeish, then-Assistant Secretary of State for Public Affairs for the U.S. government, focusing especially on the formation of the United Nations, the international organization devoted to world peace.

The narrator in Now – The Peace was Lorne Greene, known for his work on both radio broadcasts as a news announcer at CBC as well as narrating many of the earlier Canada Carries On series. His sonorous recitation led to his nickname, "The Voice of Canada", and when reading grim battle statistics, "The Voice of Doom".

== Reception ==
Now – The Peace was also produced as Voici la paix, dubbed into French. As part of the NFB's The World in Action newsreel series, Now – The Peace was produced for both the military and the theatrical market. Each film was shown over a six-month period as part of the shorts or newsreel segments in approximately 800 theatres across Canada. The NFB also had an arrangement with United Artists to ensure that newsreels would get a wider release in North America.

After the six-month theatrical tour ended, individual films were made available on 16 mm, to schools, libraries, churches and factories, extending the life of these films for another year or two. They were also made available to film libraries operated by university and provincial authorities. Available from the National Film Board either online or as a DVD.

Historian Malek Khouri analyzed the role of the NFB wartime documentaries with Now – The Peace characterized as a propaganda film. "During the early years of the NFB, its creative output was largely informed by the turbulent political and social climate the world was facing. World War II, Communism, unemployment, the role of labour unions, and working conditions were all subjects featured by the NFB during the period from 1939 to 1946".
