= Global Air Routes =

- Screenshot: Title frame
- Directed by: Stuart Legg
- Written by: Stuart Legg
- Produced by: Stuart Legg
- Narrated by: Lorne Greene
- Production company: National Film Board of Canada
- Distributed by: United Artists
- Release date: 1944
- Running time: 14 minutes, 45 seconds
- Country: Canada
- Language: English

Global Air Routes is a 14-minute 1944 Canadian documentary film produced by the National Film Board of Canada, directed and edited by Stuart Legg. The film is part of The World in Action series. Legg directed a number of documentaries for both The World in Action and earlier Canada Carries On series. Many of the documentaries were created as morale-boosting propaganda films during the Second World War.

== Synopsis ==
In 1944, the Allied nations, including Canada, created air supply routes to transport both troops and war materiel from home bases and factories to the battlefield. The United States Army Air Forces Air Transport Command, however, carried the bulk of all air transport across a global system of airfields and terminals that spanned five continents and four oceans. The ubiquitous Douglas C-47 Skytrain, derived from the prewar Douglas DC-3 airliner, did most of the work, but the new Douglas C-54 Skymaster, a larger four-engine transport, as well as other advances such as helicopters, small personal aircraft, cargo carrying gliders and a chain of floating ocean runways, were being contemplated as future advances in aviation.

A concern that national interests could create rivalries and hinder future development, led the United States to advocate for an organization that would regulate airlines flying anywhere in the world. Equally interested in postwar air routes was Great Britain, whose aviation industries may have to retool to convert to a peacetime role. Prewar, British Overseas Airways provided a link to the far-flung British Commonwealth, much like the U.S. carrier Pan-Am Airways, which had established global routes. In the Arctic, both the Soviet Union and Canada were also interested in air regulation, as exploration, mining development and settlement required air transport to bridge large expanses of the Arctic. Cooperation between the Soviet Union and Canada could result in further development. Global air transport also had the potential to further world unity.

== Production ==
Global Air Routes, made during the Second World War, was similar to Now — The Peace, both described on screen as "editorials". Typical of the NFB's World In Action series of documentary short films, Global Air Routes was intended to prepare Canadians for the post-war world. This film focused especially on the advances made in aviation, one of the main themes of the National Film Board identified throughout its formative years.

The narrator of Global Air Routes was Lorne Greene, known for his work on both radio broadcasts as a news announcer at CBC as well as narrating many of the Canada Carries On series. His sonorous recitation led to his nickname, "the Voice of Canada", and when reading grim battle statistics, "the Voice of Doom".

== Reception ==
As part of The World in Action series, Global Air Routes was produced in 35 mm for the theatrical market. Each film was shown over a six-month period as part of the shorts or newsreel segments in approximately 800 theatres across Canada. The NFB had an arrangement with Famous Players theatres to ensure that Canadians from coast to coast could see them, with further distribution by United Artists.

After the six-month theatrical tour ended, individual films were made available on 16 mm to schools, libraries, churches and factories, extending the life of these films for another year or two. They were also made available to film libraries operated by university and provincial authorities.
