= Inside Fighting China =

- Title frame
- Directed by: Stuart Legg
- Written by: Stuart Legg
- Narrated by: Lorne Greene
- Edited by: Stuart Legg
- Production company: National Film Board of Canada
- Distributed by: United Artists
- Release date: 1941
- Running time: 22 minutes
- Country: Canada
- Language: English

Inside Fighting China is a 1941 22-minute Canadian short documentary film produced by the National Film Board of Canada for distribution by United Artists, as part of the wartime The World in Action series. (Note: With Inside Fighting Canada and Inside Fighting Russia, Inside Fighting China was part of a NFB trilogy with a similar theme.) The film documents China's resistance to Japan's invasion during the Second World War. Inside Fighting China is directed by Stuart Legg, and narrated by Lorne Greene. The film's French version title is La Chine sous les armes.

== Synopsis ==
In 1931, while the United States and the United Kingdom are mired in the Great Depression and consumed with domestic strife, Japanese territorial ambitions on China have not provoked international attention. With their diplomats extolling a new East Asian empire, Japan began a campaign to brutally subjugate China.

Following the Mukden Incident and the Japanese invasion of Manchuria, China's call for an investigation of war crimes, resulted in the League of Nations probing the use of poison gas and "liquid fire" by Japan. The international body ultimately did not intervene to end the Japanese aggression, allowing Japan as an occupying force to exploit the raw material resources of the region.

Manchuria was only the first "stepping stone" in Japan's plans, with the conquest of China leading to future aspirations on Burma and India. By 1937, plans were in place for a rapid three-month campaign that would collapse any Chinese resistance. Initially, the Japanese scored major victories, such as the Battle of Shanghai, and overrunning the Chinese capital of Nanking.

Slowly, China began to react to the Japanese invasion with individuals rallying behind the Communist and Nationalist groups that had once been vying for power. In political rallies, at schools, even in the fields, ordinary Chinese were coming together not only to stem the tide of Japanese attacks but also to address the economic and social needs that have bedevilled China. "... people still needed to learn how to conquer poverty, promote the well being of people and labour for the common good."

After failing to stop the Japanese in Wuhan, the Chinese central government was relocated to Chongqing in the Chinese interior. By 1939, Chinese victories in Changsha and Guangxi continued to put pressure on the beleaguered Chinese military. The Japanese attack on Pearl Harbor in 1941, however, brought the United States into the global conflict on the side of the British Empire.

With Western allies finally reacting to the Japanese threat in the Far East, war matériel was shipped to China. Other nations, including Canada, trained Chinese soldiers and airmen. Facing a new Chinese resolve, despite the Japanese victories and incursions deep into the interior territories, the stretched lines of the occupying forces resulted in the war in China deteriorating into an impasse.

== Cast ==
- Herbert Hoover
- Yashido Kichibu, Japanese diplomat
- Hideki Tojo, Japanese diplomat
- Yosuki Matusoka, Japanese diplomat
- Keishi Yokosawa, Japanese diplomat
- Emperor Hirohito

== Production ==
Typical of the NFB's Second World War documentary short films in The World in Action series, Inside Fighting China was made in cooperation with the Director of Public Information, Herbert Lash. The film was created as a morale boosting propaganda film. (Note: Significantly, Inside Fighting China was released two years before The Battle of China (1944), the sixth film of Frank Capra's Why We Fight propaganda film series.)Inside Fighting China was a compilation documentary that relied heavily on newsreel material, edited by Stuart Legg to provide a coherent story.

The deep baritone voice of stage actor Lorne Greene was featured in the narration of Inside Fighting China. Greene, known for his work on both radio broadcasts as a news announcer at CBC as well as narrating many of the Canada Carries On series. His sonorous recitation led to his nickname, "The Voice of Canada", and to some observers, the "voice-of-God". When reading grim battle statistics or narrating a particularly serious topic, he was known as "The Voice of Doom".

== Reception ==
Inside Fighting China was produced in 35 mm for the theatrical market. To ensure that Canadians from coast-to-coast could see them, each film was shown over a six-month period as part of the shorts or newsreel segments in approximately 800 theatres across Canada. After the success of Warclouds in the Pacific, the NFB was able to make a further arrangement with United Artists for additional titles to be distributed in the United States.

After the six-month theatrical tour ended, individual films were made available on 16 mm to schools, libraries, churches and factories, extending the life of these films for another year or two. They were also made available to film libraries operated by university and provincial authorities. A total of 199 films were produced before the series was canceled in 1959.

Historian Malek Khouri, in analyzing Inside Fighting China and the role of propaganda in the NFB wartime documentaries, said. "During the early years of the NFB, its creative output was largely informed by the turbulent political and social climate the world was facing. World War II, Communism, unemployment, the role of labour unions, and working conditions were all subjects featured by the NFB during the period from 1939 to 1946".

Khouri further stated: "unity between people from different political viewpoints is essential for defeating fascism and other forms of oppression. Such unity is also crucial for building a better and more prosperous future. Sending home a familiar message on the need to overcome political differences, Legg cites the example of the Popular Front in China, where Nationalists and Communists joined together in the resistance against the Japanese invasion in the late 1930s. ... earlier western governments' ignoring of economic and social problems eventually also led them to ignoring the growing menace of fascism which fed on social instability and lack of equitable social systems. The film also condemns the inaction of western governments in relation to the pre-war Japanese invasion of China. In a phraseology that echoes those used in statements by leaders of Communist and Popular Front movements in Canada and around the world, the film affirms that to counter all kinds of oppression people need to 'organize and unite'."

== Awards ==
Inside Fighting China was nominated for an Academy Award for Best Documentary Feature at the 15th Academy Awards in 1942, as part of an expanded category featuring over two dozen nominations for World War II Allied propaganda films. "... 'Inside Fighting China', one of the earlier films to talk about China's struggles with Japan. It came out two years before Frank Capra's full length documentary 'The Battle of China'."

== See also ==
- Warclouds in the Pacific (1941) NFB documentary that warned of an imminent Japanese attack on the United States
- Pincers on Japan (1941), a NFB documentary on the Pacific War
