= Churchill's Island =

1941 Canadian propaganda film

- Opening title showing the island of Great Britain and Ireland
- Directed by: Stuart Legg
- Written by: Stuart Legg
- Produced by: Stuart Legg
- Narrated by: Lorne Greene
- Edited by: Stuart Legg
- Music by: Lucio Agostini
- Production companies: National Film Board of Canada; Associated Screen Studios, Montreal
- Distributed by: National Film Board of Canada; Columbia Pictures of Canada
- Release date: 1941
- Running time: 21 minutes, 27 seconds
- Country: Canada
- Language: English
- Budget: $4,900.15

Churchill's Island (La Forteresse de Churchill) is a 1941 propaganda film chronicling the defence of Britain during the Second World War. The film was written and directed by Stuart Legg and produced by the National Film Board of Canada (NFB) for the Director of Information, Government of Canada.

== Synopsis ==
Churchill's Island describes the military and civilian elements that were involved in the Battle of Britain. The Royal Air Force in an epic battle with the Luftwaffe, was able to wrest control of the skies, while the Royal Navy controlled the sea lanes around the embattled island. Other aspects of the struggle that are depicted included the British coastal defenses, the establishment of a mechanized cavalry, the role of merchant seamen and, after the Dunkirk evacuation, the re-building of a decimated British Army.

== Production ==
Originally produced for the NFB's Canada Carries On series of documentary short films, it was released internationally in The World in Action series. Typical of the NFB's series, Churchill's Island relied heavily on newsreel footage. The British sequences were from the British Ministry of Information. The deep baritone voice of stage actor Lorne Greene (nicknamed "the Voice of Doom") was featured in the narration.

== Reception ==
The National Film Board of Canada was able to promote Churchill's Island as an Oscar winner, giving the newly created film agency much needed cachet.

Churchill's Island was produced in 35 mm for the theatrical market. Each film in the series was shown over a six-month period as part of the shorts or newsreel segments in approximately 800 theatres across Canada. The NFB had an arrangement with Famous Players theatres to ensure that Canadians from coast to coast could see them, with further distribution by Columbia Pictures.

After the six-month theatrical tour ended, individual films were made available on 16 mm to schools, libraries, churches and factories, extending the life of these films for another year or two. They were also made available to film libraries operated by university and provincial authorities. A total of 199 films were produced before the series was canceled in 1959.

=== Honors ===
Churchill's Island received the first Oscar for Best Documentary Short Subject, awarded at the 14th Academy Awards ceremony in 1942. It also represents the first Oscar for the NFB, which had been created just two years earlier in 1939.

== Preservation ==
The Academy Film Archive preserved Churchill's Island in 2005.

== See also ==
- List of Allied propaganda films of World War II
