= The Home Front (1940 film) =

- Opening title
- Directed by: Stanley Hawes
- Produced by: Stanley Hawes
- Narrated by: Lorne Greene
- Cinematography: Roger Barlow; J.B. Scott
- Music by: Lucio Agostini
- Production company: National Film Board of Canada
- Distributed by: Columbia Pictures of Canada
- Release date: 1940
- Running time: 10 minutes, 30 seconds
- Country: Canada
- Language: English

The Home Front (La Femme et la Guerre) is a 10-minute 1940 Canadian documentary film, made by the National Film Board of Canada (NFB) as part of the wartime Canada Carries On series. (Note: Still known at the time as the Canadian Government Motion Picture Bureau.) The film was produced and directed by Stanley Hawes.

== Synopsis ==
In 1940, as Canadian men are being mobilized to serve in the military, three million women are also mobilized to serve on the "home front". For the second time in a generation, women again have shouldered the burden of maintaining the households and taking on roles that will allow men to fight. From playing a role in hospitals and medical research, industrial labour, hospitality, education and domesticity, the service these women provided to their country is significant.

On the home front, women can strengthen the war effort by strengthening the household, and, if they can, to enter the industrial workforce to supplement men in many positions at munitions factories. Women can take on specialized civilian roles such as driving heavy equipment or flight training at flying clubs. (Note: At the time, women pilots were not allowed to train military flyers.) In the military, Royal Canadian Air Force (RCAF) women became clerks, drivers, photographers, air photo interpreters, weather observers, instrument mechanics, parachute riggers as well as many administrative and technical positions in the RCAF. Most women served at British Commonwealth Air Training Plan stations across Canada. (Note: Their motto was: "We serve that men may fly.")

As the stress of "total war" becomes greater, it is imperative that women in important organizations such as the Red Cross can play a dominant role on the home front. From its headquarters in Toronto, the Red Cross is in touch with depots and workrooms across the country where women provide services that "lessen the suffering of others". Others such as the Women's Institutes and Imperial Order Daughters of the Empire also provide essential services, such as raising funds for weapons of war.

Women will also play a part after the war, in building a new world.

== Cast ==
- Elsie MacGill, aircraft designer
- Helen Harrison, flight instructor
- Mrs. W.R. Campbell, national chair of women's war work at the Red Cross in Canada
- Monica Nuegen, Canadian Broadcasting Corporation (CBC) reporter

== Production ==
Typical of the NFB's Second World War documentary short films in the Canada Carries On series, The Home Front was created as a morale boosting propaganda film. The film relied heavily on newsreel material but also included footage shot for the film by cinematographers Roger Barlow and J.B. Scott, with on-location sound recording by technicians William H. Lane, C.J. Quick and Walter Darling. The unusual use of intertitles similar to those used in silent film, provided onscreen dialogue for the audience.

The deep baritone voice of stage actor Lorne Greene was featured in the narration of The Home Front. Greene was known for his work on both radio broadcasts as a news announcer at CBC as well as narrating many of the Canada Carries On series. His sonorous recitation led to his nickname, "The Voice of Canada", and to some observers, the "voice-of-God". When reading grim battle statistics or narrating a particularly serious topic, he was known as "The Voice of Doom".

== Reception ==
The Home Front was produced in 35 mm for the theatrical market. Each film in the Canada Carries On series was shown over a six-month period as part of the shorts or newsreel segments in approximately 800 theatres across Canada. The NFB had an arrangement with Famous Players theatres to ensure that Canadians from coast-to-coast could see them, with further distribution by Columbia Pictures.

After the six-month theatrical tour ended, individual films were made available on 16 mm to schools, libraries, churches and factories, extending the life of these films for another year or two. They were also made available to film libraries operated by university and provincial authorities. A total of 199 films were produced before the series was canceled in 1959.

Historian Malek Khouri analyzed the role of the NFB wartime documentaries with The Home Front characterized as an example of a propaganda film. "During the early years of the NFB, its creative output was largely informed by the turbulent political and social climate the world was facing. World War II, Communism, unemployment, the role of labour unions, and working conditions were all subjects featured by the NFB during the period from 1939 to 1946".

The role of women depicted in Home Front also showed an acceptance of a new role to come in postwar years. In an examination of the role of the NFB in wartime, historian Gary Evans observed: "If contemporary feminists sense omissions and patronizing in the film, one must at least acknowledge that [The Home Front] expressed a positive attitude to working women and was conditioning audiences to become accustomed to new and permanent women's roles in the workplace."

== See also ==
- Wings on her Shoulder (1943), a NFB documentary on the Royal Canadian Air Force Women's Division
- Rosies of the North (1999), a NFB documentary on the women who worked at the Canadian Car and Foundry building fighter and bomber aircraft in the Second World War
