= The World in Action =

The World in Action (a.k.a. World in Action) was a monthly series of propaganda films from the National Film Board of Canada (NFB), created to boost morale and show the Allied war effort during the Second World War.

The series was inspired by the success of the NFB's Canada Carries On series. Patterned after the popular American March of Time newsreels, The World in Action was designed to appear to a broader international audience than Canada Carries On . It was distributed internationally by United Artists.

The World in Action series was produced in 35 mm for the theatrical market. Each film was shown over a six-month period as part of the shorts or newsreel segments in approximately 800 theatres across Canada. The NFB had an arrangement with Famous Players theatres to ensure that Canadians from coast-to-coast could see them, with further distribution by United Artists.

After the six-month theatrical tour ended, individual films were made available on 16 mm to schools, libraries, churches and factories, extending their life for another year or two. They were also made available to film libraries operated by university and provincial authorities.

The narrator in Global Air Routes in The World in Action series was Lorne Greene, known for his work on both radio broadcasts as a news announcer at CBC as well as narrating many of the Canada Carries On series. His sonorous recitation led to his nickname, "The Voice of Canada", and when reading grim battle statistics, "The Voice of Doom".

== Series titles ==
- Churchill's Island (1941), Directed, Produced by Stuart Legg, 22 min. *Originally released as part of Canada Carries On
- Food - Weapon of Conquest (1941) Directed, Produced by Stuart Legg, 22 min.
- Ferry Pilot (1942) Produced by Stuart Legg, Directed by Ross McLean, 19 min.
- Freighters Under Fire (1942), 26 min.
- Geopolitik - Hitler's Plan for Empire (1942) Directed and produced by Stuart Legg, 20 min.
- Inside Fighting China (1942) Produced by Stuart Legg, 22 min.
- Inside Fighting Russia (1942) Produced by Stuart Legg, 22 min.
- Invasion of North Africa (1942), 21 min.
- The Mask of Nippon (1942) Directed by Margaret Palmer, produced by Stuart Legg, 21 min.
- Road to Tokyo (1942) Produced by Raymond Spottiswoode, 18 min.
- This Is Blitz (1942) Directed by Stuart Legg, 22 min.
- Battle Is Their Birthright (1943) Directed and produced by Stuart Legg, 24 min.
- Corvette Port Arthur (1943) Directed and produced by Joris Ivens, 22 min.
- Fighting Dutch (1943) Produced by Raymond Spottiswoode, 15 min.
- The Gates of Italy (1943) Produced by Stuart Legg, Tom Daly, 21 min.
- Invasion of Europe (1943), 21 min.
- Labour Front (1943), 21 min.
- Letter from Overseas (1943), 15 min.
- Paratroops (1943) Directed and produced by Stanley Hawes, 10 min.
- War Birds (1943), 15 min.
- The War for Men's Minds (1943) Directed and produced by Stuart Legg, 21 min.
- Wings on Her Shoulder (1943) Directed by Jane Marsh, 9 min.
- Fortress Japan (1944) Produced by Stuart Legg, 16 min.
- Balkan Powder Keg (1944) Directed and produced by Stuart Legg, 19 min.
- Battle of Europe (1944) Directed by Tom Daly, produced by Stuart Legg, 15 min.
- Global Air Routes (1944) Directed and produced by Stuart Legg, 14 min. 45 sec.
- Inside France (1944) Directed by Stuart Legg and Tom Daly, produced by Stuart Legg, 21 min.
- Our Northern Neighbour (1944) Directed by Tom Daly, produced by Stuart Legg, 21 min.
- Ships and Men (1944) Directed by Leslie McFarlane, produced by Ernest Borneman, 18 min.
- When Asia Speaks (1944) Directed by Gordon Weisenborn, produced by Stuart Legg, 19 min.
- Zero Hour (1944) Produced by Stuart Legg, 22 min.
- Food: Secret of the Peace (1945) Directed and produced by Stuart Legg, 11 min.
- Guilty Men (1945) Directed, Produced by Tom Daly, 11 min.
- John Bull's Own Island (1945) Directed and produced by Stuart Legg, 20 min.
- Maps in Action (1945) Produced by Stuart Legg, 20 min.
- Now — The Peace (1945) Produced by Stuart Legg, 21 min.
- Spotlight on the Balkans (1945) Produced by Stuart Legg, 11 min.
