= Ross McLean (civil servant) =

Journalist and film producer (1905–1984)

John Ross McLean
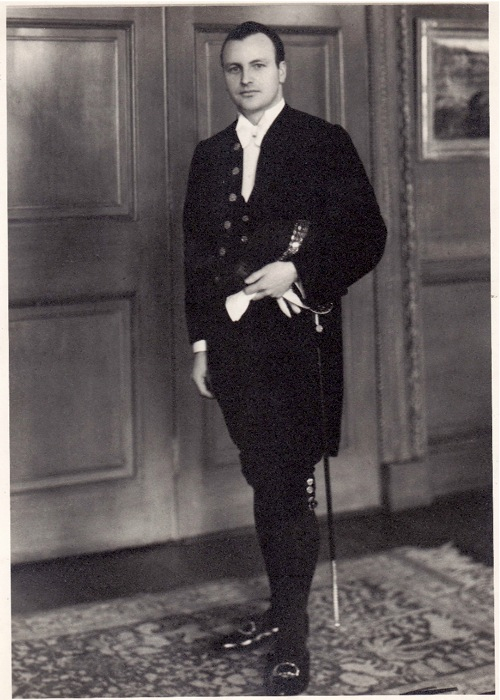
- Born: John Ross McLean; 5 July 1905; Ethelbert, Manitoba, Canada
- Died: 26 July 1984 (aged 79); Ottawa, Ontario, Canada
- Education: University of Manitoba (M.A.); University of Oxford (B.Litt.); University of Oxford (M.Litt.)
- Occupations: Civil Servant, Journalist
- Spouse: Beverley Cosh
- Children: Digby, Yolande

John Ross McLean (1905-1984), the 11th of 12 children of a Northern Manitoba minister and farmer, was born in the small prairie village of Ethelbert in 1905. He became a Canadian journalist and civil servant. In the latter role he served as the Commissioner of the National Film Board of Canada (NFB) in the 1940s, having previously been instrumental in the foundation of the Board the previous decade.

== Early years ==
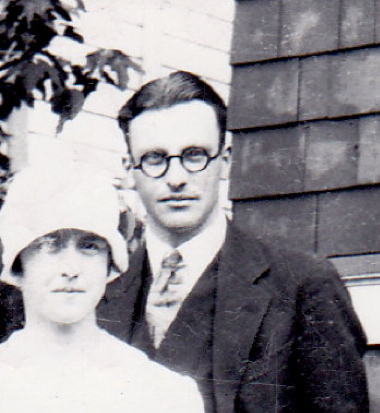
John Ross McLean, 1926

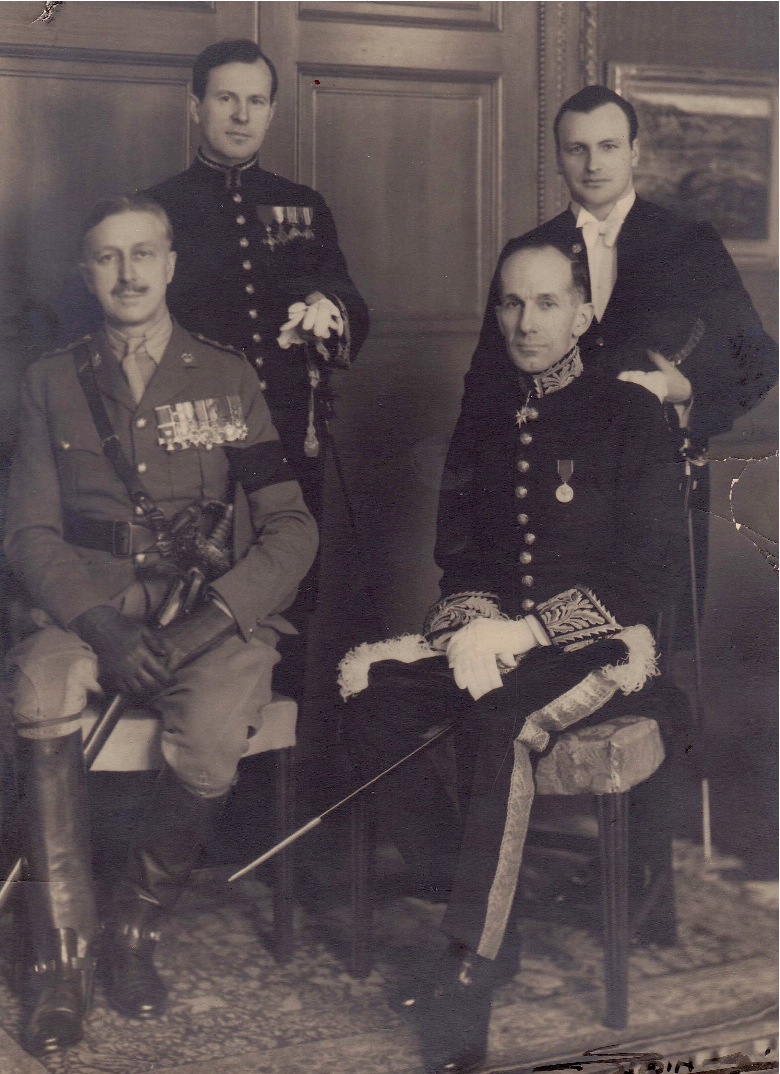
John Ross McLean (top right) with Georges Vanier, Vincent Massey and Lester Pearson, Canada House, London.

In the 1920s McLean studied at Brandon College, and then later at the University of Manitoba. After gaining his MA from Manitoba in 1927, he won a Rhodes Scholarship to Balliol College at the University of Oxford in the United Kingdom. After completing his academic career in 1931, he moved to work in the United States, for the Unemployment Relief Commission of Northern Illinois. In 1932 he returned to Canada, working for the Association of Canadian Clubs and also engaging in a journalistic career. He wrote for Saturday Night and Canadian Forum magazines, and in 1935 became the National Liberal Federation's editor of publications.

== National Film Board ==
In 1936 he was appointed the personal secretary to the Canadian High Commissioner the United Kingdom, Vincent Massey. In 1938 Massey and McLean discussed how unimpressed they were by the standard of films produced by the Canadian Government Motion Picture Bureau. McLean had seen and admired the work of British documentary film-maker John Grierson, and suggested to Massey that he should persuade the Canadian government to allow Grierson to compile a report into its film-making activities. This report led, in 1939, to the formation of the new National Film Board, with Grierson in charge.

In the same year that the NFB was established, Grierson hired McLean to serve under him as the Assistant Film Commissioner. After arguments with the government over the content of several films, Grierson resigned his position as Government Film Commissioner in 1945. During the turbulent postwar years, McLean succeeded Grierson as Commissioner, initially on an interim basis but from January 1947 as an official appointment. McLean was faced with several problems during his time in charge, including budget cuts, a reduction in staffing and conflicts with the dominant United States film industry.

McLean's greatest problem, however, came from the government's fear of communism within the NFB. In an atmosphere of heightening Cold War tensions with a government minister suggesting that certain NFB employees were engaged in Communist activities, a Royal Canadian Mounted Police investigation was instigated into communism at the Board. Several employees were deemed "security risks", but following the findings of the investigation, McLean refused to fire any staff members. He believed that the political beliefs of his staff were irrelevant as long as it did not interfere with their work. In December 1949, McLean was informed that his contract would not be renewed when it expired in January. Ralph Foster, then assistant commissioner, resigned in protest. Several other members of McLean's staff threatened to resign as well, but he dissuaded them from doing so as he did not want the NFB to be harmed.

McLean's nephew, Grant McLean, had begun working as a film director at the NFB during his uncle's time there. Grant, whose own NFB career spanned nearly three decades, described his uncle as a very philosophic person who believed very much in the concept of film and public information. He went on to serve as interim Commissioner himself during the 1960s.

== Post-1950 ==
In 1950, McLean moved to Paris with his wife and young son to head the film division at the United Nations Educational, Scientific and Cultural Organization (UNESCO), a position he was to hold until 1957. He returned to Canada as a writer and broadcaster, contributing to a number of publications. Then in 1960 he assumed the post of research director at the Broadcast Board of Governors which later became the Canadian Radio-television and Telecommunications Commission (CRTC), where he eventually took on the role of special policy advisor, a post he was to hold until he retired in 1973.

== Family ==
Beverley Bell McLean by Yousuf Karsh, 1935

Ross married Beverley Bell Cosh and they had two children, Digby and Yolande.

In an interview with the Toronto Star, Digby was reported as saying that his father was intensely nationalistic, and that he was perhaps best known for having stood up to U.S. film interests during his NFB tenure. Yolande remarked that her father loved history, read voraciously and travelled widely, sometimes forgetting to tell his family his next destination. Fluent in several languages, Mr McLean taught himself French by translating the Bible. In later life, McLean suffered from Alzheimer's disease. He died July 26, 1984, in Ottawa, several weeks after Beverley, who died on May 17 the same year.

Cultural offices
Preceded by John Grierson	Government Film Commissioner and Chairperson of the National Film Board of Canada; 1945-1950	Succeeded by William Arthur Irwin
