= Warclouds in the Pacific =

1941 film

- Film poster
- Directed by: Stuart Legg
- Written by: Stuart Legg
- Produced by: Stuart Legg
- Narrated by: Lorne Greene
- Production company: National Film Board of Canada
- Distributed by: Columbia Pictures of Canada
- Release date: December 1, 1941
- Running time: 20 minutes
- Country: Canada
- Language: English

Warclouds in the Pacific is a 20-minute 1941 Canadian documentary film, part of the Canada Carries On series of short films by the National Film Board of Canada. The film was produced, written and directed by Stuart Legg and narrated by Lorne Greene. Warclouds in the Pacific, which warned of an imminent Japanese attack, was released just one week before the attack on Pearl Harbor.

== Synopsis ==
In 1941, tensions in the Pacific were accentuated by Imperial Japan engaging in the Sino-Japanese War, as well as threatening to go to war with the other great powers in the region: Great Britain and the United States. Throughout the 1900s, global trade had allowed for great advances in industry and technology, but the militaristic government of Japan in the late 1930s chose to align itself with Nazi Germany, further sending danger signals abroad.

In leaving behind its feudal history, Japan became an economic and military superpower but its rise to prominence had repercussions for Canada. Westerners who observed the frenzied activity in Japanese naval yards began to leave the country, while Japanese-Canadians who had adopted their new homeland were fearful of what might come. Western nations, including Canada, ramped up their military preparations, knowing that combatant nations already at war might soon be entangled in a Pacific conflict.

== Production ==
Warclouds in the Pacific was the fifth of the Canada Carries On series, produced with financial backing from the Wartime Information Board, served as a portent of a future Pacific war. The documentary was created as a morale-boosting propaganda film during the World War II.

The narrator of Warclouds in the Pacific was Lorne Greene, known for his work on both radio broadcasts as a news announcer at CBC as well as narrating many of the Canada Carries On series. His sonorous recitation led to his nickname, "the Voice of Canada", and to some observers, the "Voice-of-God". When reading grim battle statistics or, as in Warclouds in the Pacific, narrating a particularly serious topic such as Canada going to war, he was "the Voice of Doom".

The Department of External Affairs opposed releasing the film as Canada was not at war with Japan and did not want to strain diplomatic relations.

== Release ==
The film was released in Canada in November 1941. John Grierson sold the film to United Artists for distribution in the United States following its entrance in World War II. An injunction was sought by The March of Time due to the film using footage from it, but allowed its release after Grierson contacted other newsreels in order to replace The March of Time.

== Reception ==
As part of the Canada Carries On series, Warclouds in the Pacific was produced in 35 mm for the theatrical market. Each film was shown over a six-month period as part of the shorts or newsreel segments in approximately 800 theatres across Canada. Along with others in the series, Warclouds in the Pacific received widespread circulation and, in particular, "greatly helped to draw attention to Canada's film board."

The NFB had an arrangement with Famous Players theatres to ensure that Canadians from coast to coast could see the documentary series, with further distribution by Columbia Pictures. After the six-month theatrical tour ended, individual films were made available on 16 mm to schools, libraries, churches and factories, extending the life of these films for another year or two. They were also made available to film libraries operated by university and provincial authorities.

== Honours ==
Along with Churchill's Island, another NFB production directed by Stuart Legg, Warclouds in the Pacific was nominated for an Academy Award for Best Documentary (Short Subject), albeit losing to Churchill's Island.

Clips from Warclouds in the Pacific were used in John Kramer's documentary, Has Anybody Here Seen Canada? A History of Canadian Movies 1939-1953 (1979) and later, incorporated into Colin Browne’s 1986 documentary, The Image Before Us "... where the images of fear and war were contrasted with the reality of Canada’s wartime treatment of Japanese-Canadians."

== See also ==
- Gateway to Asia (1945)

== Works cited ==
- Jones, David (1981). Movies and Memoranda: An Interpretative History of the National Film Board of Canada. Canadian Film Institute. ISBN 0919096212.
- McInnes, Graham (2004). One Man's Documentary: A Memoir of the Early Years of the National Film Board. University of Manitoba Press. ISBN 9780887553516.

=== Bibliography ===
- Bennett, Linda Greene. My Father's Voice: The Biography of Lorne Greene. Bloomington, Indiana: iUniverse, Inc., 2004. ISBN 978-0-595-33283-0.
- Ellis, Jack C. and Betsy A. McLane. "Theatrical Series". New History of Documentary Film. London: Continuum International Publishing Group, 2005. ISBN 978-1-4411-2457-9.
- Rist, Peter. Guide to the Cinema(s) of Canada. Westport, Connecticut: Greenwood Publishing Group, 2001. ISBN 978-0-3132-9931-5.
