= Wartime Information Board =

Former Canadian government agency

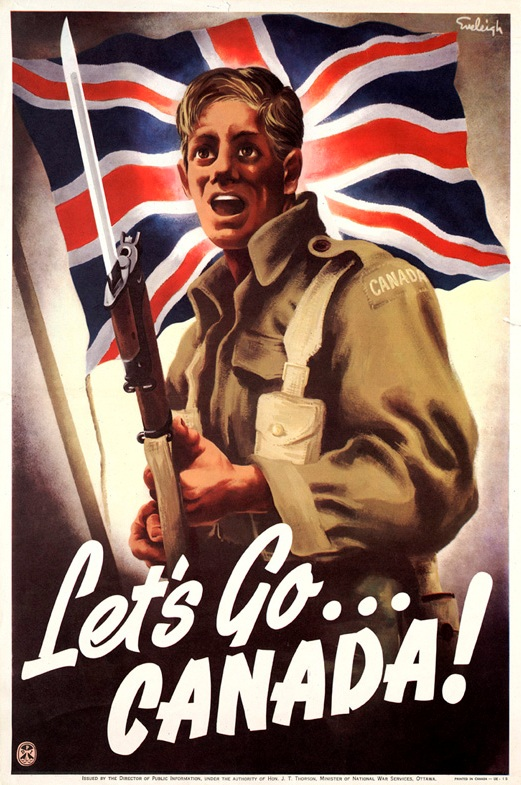
Poster created by the board, 1942.

The Wartime Information Board was a Canadian government agency established on 9 September 1942, succeeding the Bureau of Public Information, to coordinate the existing public information service of the government, supervise the release from government sources of Canadian war news and information, and facilitate distribution of Canadian war information both internally and externally.

When the Second World War began, Canada did not have a centralized information service to deal with information dissemination. On 8 December 1939, the Bureau of Public Information was created. Initially it had worked with the Chief Censor and was later attached to the Department of National War Services. Its initial function was to coordinate and supply information produced by its own staff and by other departments, including Department of National Defence and Department of Munitions and Supply. However issues with dissemination led to a report that resulted in the creation of the Wartime Information Board.

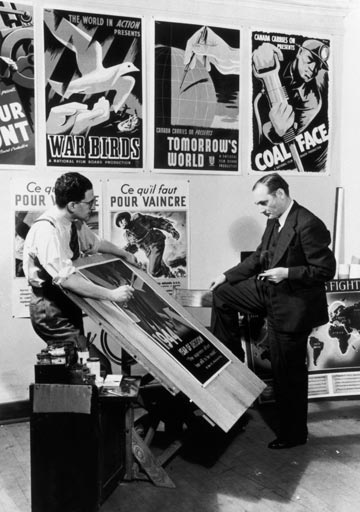
John Grierson (right), National Film Board (NFB) Commissioner, and Harry Mayerovitch, director of the Wartime Information Board's (WIB) Graphic Arts Division, examine posters in 1944.

Chairmen of the Board included Thomas Vinning and Norman A.M. Mackenzie. However, the real power on the board was held by its general manager who included John Grierson and A. Davidson Dunton. Thomas Vinning was replaced by John Grierson, the Commissioner of the National Film Board, as General Manager of the Wartime Information Board. By taking the reins of the graphics department of the Wartime Information Board he was able to extend the use of a documentary style to the photographs, posters and publications put out by the government.

The Wartime Information Board’s duty was to create a common outlook amongst Canadians on their identity and perception on the war. The material created by this agency served to inform on the war and encourage wartime participation. The focus was to ensure high morale and patriotic fervour: "sharing together in common experience, working and striving in great causes." Over the course of the war, the Board established various foreign offices, undertook surveys and opinion polls, gave guided tours, studied Canadian news, and developed press information.

In January 1943, all photographic operations came under the jurisdiction of the National Film Board. It produced more graphic material needed by the government for the war effort, and funds from the Wartime Information Board served to support the making and distribution of films.

Throughout the war, the Wartime Information Board released a monthly account of the war effort in the form of a publication called “Canada at War”. The publication covered a wide range of topics, from wartime industry, women at war, etc. The publication was distributed throughout Canada to various audiences from farmers to housewives.

The board was an early developer of public opinion polling techniques in Canada.

At the end of the war, The Wartime Information Board released a series of pamphlets, as a supplement to informing Canadians about post-war reconstruction and urging discussions of "the most positive approach to some of the outstanding problems of Canada's future."

== Posters created by the board ==
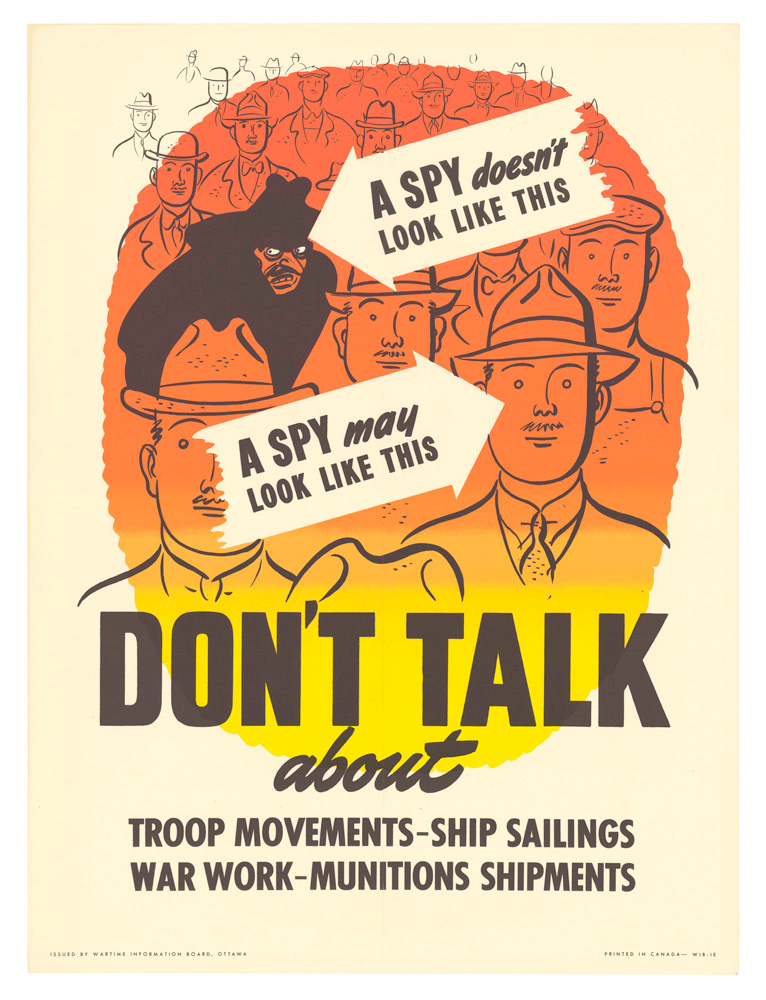
Canadian Propaganda Poster "Don't Talk" by the Wartime Information Board

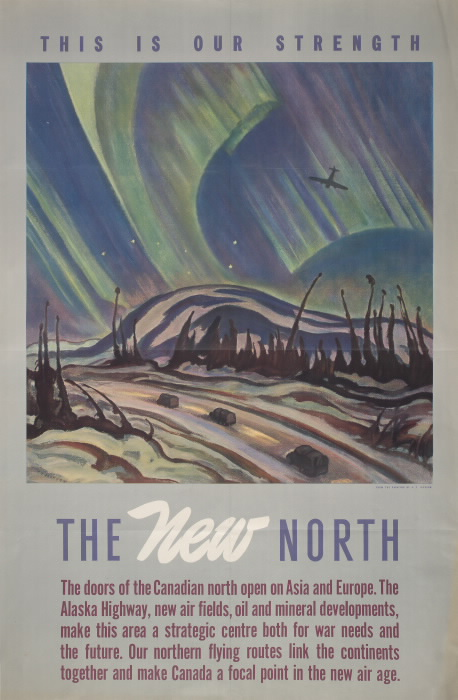
Canadian Propaganda Poster "This is our Strength - New North" by the Wartime Information Board

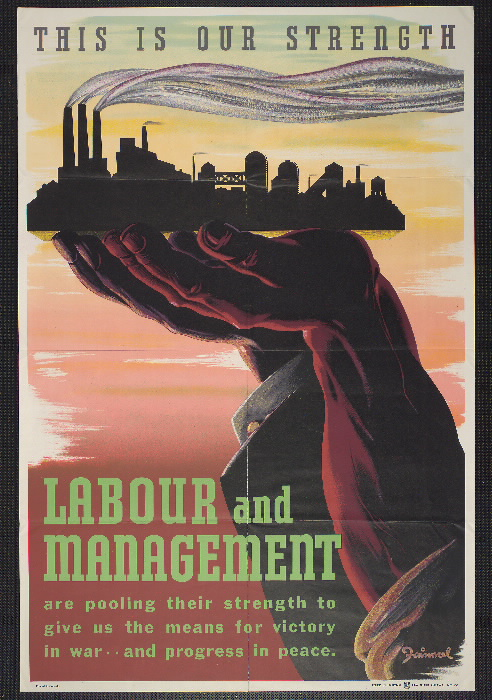
Canadian Propaganda Poster "This is our Strength Labour" by the Wartime Information Board

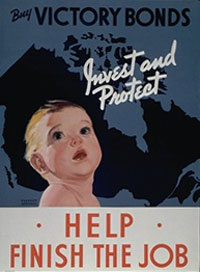
Canadian Propaganda Poster "Invest & Protect - Help Finish the Job" by the Wartime Information Board

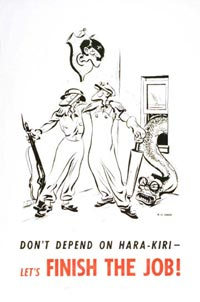
Canadian Propaganda Poster "Finish the Job!" by the Wartime Information Board

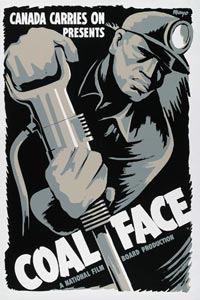
Canadian Propaganda Poster "Canada Carries On Presents Coal Face" by the Wartime Information Board

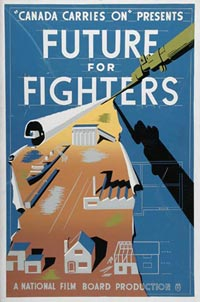
Canadian Propaganda Poster "Canada Carries on Presents Future for Fighters" by the Wartime Information Board

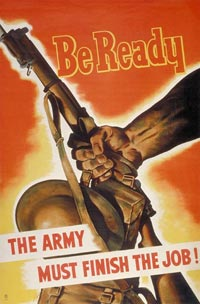
Canadian Propaganda Poster "If You Don't Need it, Don't Buy It" by the Wartime Information Board

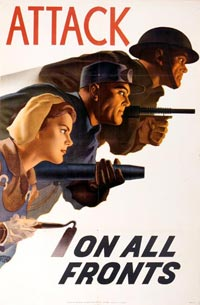
Canadian Propaganda Poster "Attack on All Fronts" by the Wartime Information Board

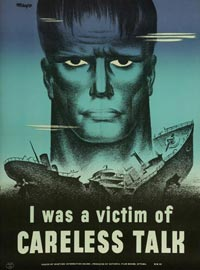
Canadian Propaganda Poster "Was a Victim of Careless Talk" by the Wartime Information Board

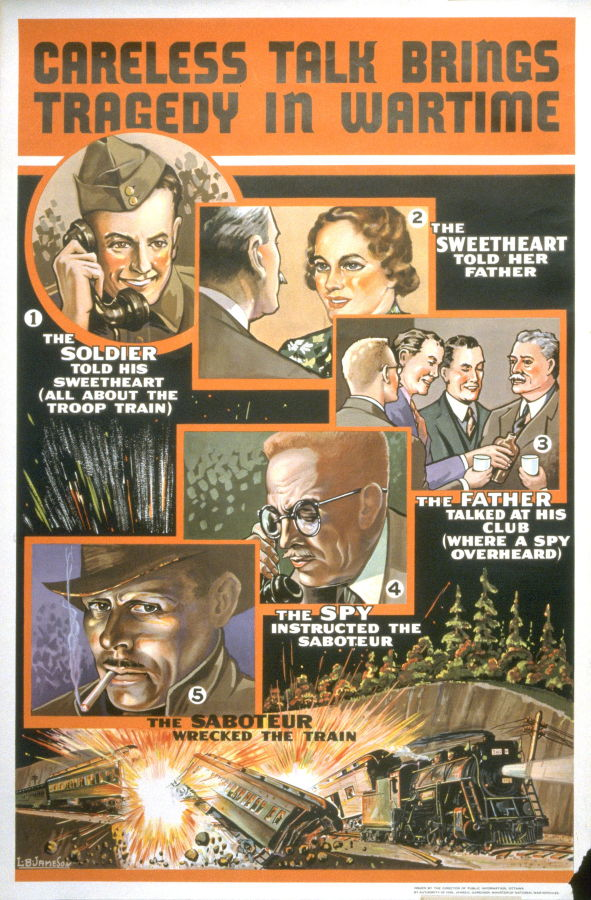
Canadian Propaganda Poster "Careless Talk Brings Tragedy" by the Wartime Information Board

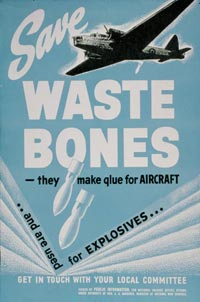
Canadian Propaganda Poster "Save Waste Bones" by the Wartime Information Board

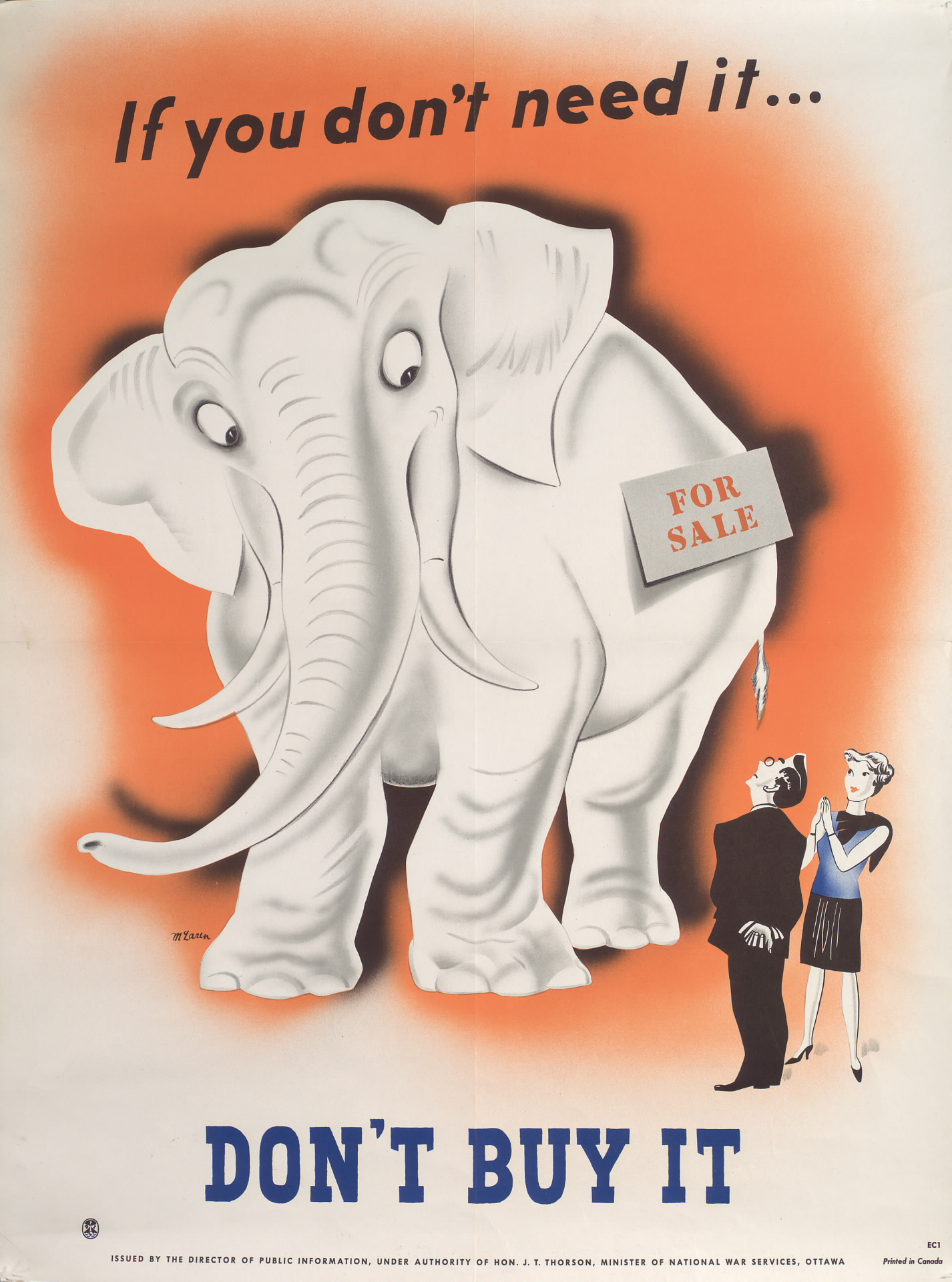
Canadian Propaganda Poster "If You Don't Need It, Don't Buy It" by the Wartime Information Board

== General references ==
- Brandon, Laura. War Art in Canada: A Critical History. Toronto: Art Canada Institute, 2022.
- Gary Evans, John Grierson and the National Film Board: The politics of Wartime Propaganda. Toronto: University of Toronto Press, 1984.
- Wartime Information Board, Canada at War, 1941-1945.
