= Lucio Agostini =

Italian-born composer, arranger and conductor (1913–1996)

Lucio Agostini (30 December 1913 (Fano, Italy) – 15 December 1996 (Toronto)) was an Italian-born composer, arranger, and conductor who established his career in Canada.

== Life ==
At age three, Agostini moved with his family to Montreal, Quebec, Canada. His father, Giuseppe Agostini, was a composer and conductor and it is from him that he had his initial musical training beginning at age five. He later pursued further studies in harmony and composition with Louis Michiels and Henri Miro and in cello with Peter Van der Meerschen.

At 16, Agostini was playing with the Montreal Symphony Orchestra as a cellist and was a part-time band player in a nightclub band playing saxophone and clarinet. From 1932 to 1943, he composed film music for the Associated Screen News of Canada newsreels, and in 1934 he began working as a conductor for the Canadian Radio Broadcasting Commission (the forerunner to the Canadian Broadcasting Corporation). In Toronto, where he moved in 1943, he composed and conducted the incidental music for drama series and variety programs on the CBC radio and television, and for over 20 years he held the position as conductor and arranger on the popular weekly series Front Page Challenge. As a composer, he wrote for The Tommy Ambrose Show and The World of Music, musicals, scores for movies (including a brief stint in Hollywood from 1955 to 1956), shorts (many for the National Film Board of Canada's Canada Carries On and The World in Action series), concertos and an opera.

Agostini won the John Drainie Award at the 12th ACTRA Awards in 1983 in recognition of his contributions to broadcasting in Canada.
