= List of Allied propaganda films of World War II =

James Stewart in Winning Your Wings (1942)

During World War II and immediately after it, in addition to the many private films created to help the war effort, many Allied countries had governmental or semi-governmental agencies commission propaganda and training films for home and foreign consumption. Animated films are not included here.

== British Empire and Commonwealth ==
=== United Kingdom ===
==== 1939 ====
Title	Director	Notes
The Lion Has Wings	Adrian Brunel, Brian Desmond Hurst, Michael Powell, Alexander Korda (uncredited)	

==== 1940 ====
Title	Director	Notes
The Call for Arms	Brian Desmond Hurst	
Civilian Front	Mary Field	
London Can Take It!	Humphrey Jennings and Harry Watt	
Men of the Lightship	David MacDonald	
Miss Grant Goes to the Door	Brian Desmond Hurst	
Musical Poster Number One	Len Lye	
Neighbours Under Fire	Ralph Bond	

==== 1941 ====
Title	Director	Notes
An Airman's Letter to His Mother	Michael Powell	
ATS		A film about the Auxiliary Territorial Service, a women's formation
The Battle of London	Jack Kemp	
Christmas Under Fire	Charles Hasse and Harry Watt	Nominated for Academy Award for Documentary Short Subject
Ferry Pilot	Pat Jackson	
Fighting Fields	Stanley Russell	
Food for Freedom		
Green Girdle	Ralph Keene	
The Heart of Britain	Humphrey Jennings	
How to Dig		
How to File		
Merchant Seamen		
Plastic Surgery in Wartime		
Queen's Messengers		
Shunter Black's Night Off	Max Munden	produced by Verity Films
Target for Tonight		
Words for Battle	Humphrey Jennings	

==== 1942 ====
Title	Director	Notes
After Mein Kampf		
Alice in Switzerland		
Battle Is Our Business		
Border Weave		
Coastal Command	J. B. Holmes	
Dover		
Greek Testament		
Listen to Britain	Humphrey Jennings	Nominated for Academy Award for Documentary Short Subject
In Which We Serve	Noël Coward and David Lean	
Making a Compost Heap		
Malta G.C.		
Men of Tomorrow		
Message from Canterbury		
The Next of Kin (aka Next of Kin)	Thorold Dickinson	Originally a British War Office services training film by Ealing Studios based on the wartime security axiom that "Loose lips sink ships" / "Careless talk cost lives", it was also distributed commercially as its propaganda was of general strategic importance thus applicable to all citizens.
Night Shift		
One of Our Aircraft is Missing	Michael Powell and Emeric Pressburger	
Trinity House		
Twenty-One Miles		Nominated for Academy Award for Documentary Short Subject
Went the Day Well?	Alberto Cavalcanti	
We Serve	Carol Reed	
Winning Your Wings	John Huston and Owen Crump (uncredited)	Nominated for Academy Award for Best Documentary

==== 1943 ====
Title	Director	Notes
Before the Raid	Jiří Weiss	
Butterfly Bombs	Louise Birt	
Cameramen at War		
Close Quarters	Jack Lee	
Desert Victory		Nominated for Academy Award for Documentary Feature
Development of the English Town	Mary Field	
Fires Were Started	Humphrey Jennings	
Glorious Colours	Alfred Travers	
It's Just the Way It Is	Leslie Fenton	
Lift Your Heads	Michael Hankinson	
The People's Land	Ralph Keene	
Scottish Mazurka		
The Silent Village	Humphrey Jennings	The Nazi massacre at Lidice recreated in a Welsh village
Target for Today	William Keighley	
Waterlight	Alberto Cavalcanti	
The Volunteer	Michael Powell and Emeric Pressburger	

==== 1944 ====
Title	Director	Notes
Aventure malgache	Alfred Hitchcock	
Children of the City		
Clean Milk		
Debris Clearance		
The Great Circle		
Jungle Patrol		
Liberation of Rome		
Men of Rochdale		
New Builders		
North East Corner		
Out of Chaos		
Road to Russia		
Sailors Do Care		
Soil Erosion		
Towards the Offensive		
Tunisian Victory	Frank Capra	Co-production with US
V-1: The Robot Bomb		
V. 1		
Western Approaches		
Willing Hands		

==== 1945 ====
Title	Director	Notes
Burma Victory	Roy Boulting	
A Diary for Timothy	Humphrey Jennings	
Farm Work		
Homes for the People		
Song of the People		
Steam		
The Ten Year Plan		
This Was Japan		
The True Glory	Carol Reed	Shows the final invasion and victory in Europe; won Academy Award for Documentary Feature

=== Australia ===
In Australia the Australian News and Information Bureau, under the Department of Information, produced the following

Year	Title	Director	Notes
1941	Advance to Libya	Frank Hurley	
1942	Kokoda Front Line!	Ken G. Hall	Won Academy Award for Documentary Feature
1942	Men of Timor	Damien Parer	
1942	Moresby Under the Blitz	Ken G. Hall	
1942	Soldiers Without Uniform	Charles Chauvel	
1943	Assault on Salamaua		
1943	The Bismarck Convoy Smashed		
1945	Mid East	Frank Hurley	

=== Canada ===
In Canada, the National Film Board of Canada either distributed or produced the following as part of its Canada Carries On and The World in Action series.

==== 1940 ====
Title	Director	Notes
All Out for War		
Atlantic Patrol	Stuart Legg	
Children from Overseas	Stanley Hawes	
Controls for Victory	Philip Ragan	
Front of Steel	John McDougall	Narrated by Lorne Greene; Watch online
Home Front	Stanley Hawes	Watch online
Letter from Aldershot	Stanley Hawes	
Letter from Camp Borden	Raymond Spottiswoode	
Not Peace but a Sword	Ross McLean	Re-edited version of Lights Out in Europe
On Guard for Thee	Stanley Hawes	
Squadron 992	Frank Badgley	
Timber Front	Frank Badgley	
Wings of Youth	Raymond Spottiswoode	Narrated by Lorne Greene

==== 1941 ====
Title	Director	Notes
ACK ACK	Peter Baylis	French title: Défense contre avions
Battle of Brains	Stanley Hawes	
Call for Volunteers	Radford Crawley	
Churchill's Island	Stuart Legg	Won Academy Award for Documentary Short Subject. First NFB Oscar winner.
Fight for Liberty		
Food, Weapon of Conquest	Stuart Legg	
Guards of the North	Raymond Spottiswoode	
Heroes of the Atlantic	J.D. Davidson	Watch online
Iceland on the Prairies	Radford Crawley	
The People's War		
Soldiers All	Stuart Legg	
Strategy of Metals	Raymond Spottiswoode	
Strategy of Metals	Graham McInnes	Combination of A Call for Volunteers (above) and Ottawa, Wartime Capital
Tools of War		
Warclouds in the Pacific	Stuart Legg	Nominated for Academy Award for Documentary Short Subject
Who Sheds His Blood	Judith Crawley	
Wings of a Continent	Raymond Spottiswoode	

==== 1942 ====
Title	Director	Notes
Battle for Oil	Stuart Legg	
Battle of the Harvests	Stanley Jackson	
Blitzkrieg Tactics		Contains footage of Nazi film Feuertaufe
Everywhere in the World	Stuart Legg	Stresses Commonwealth and American solidarity
The Face of Time	Graham McInnes	Centenary of the Geological Survey of Canada. Contains war related information.
Ferry Pilot	Stuart Legg	
Field Training in Winter	Stanley Hawes	
Fighting Ships	Graham McInnes	
Forward Commandos	Raymond Spottiswoode	
Freighters Under Fire		
Geopolitik - Hitler's Plan for Empire	Stuart Legg	
Great Guns	Graham McInnes	
If	Philip Ragan	
Inside Fighting Canada	Jane Marsh	Watch online
Inside Fighting China		Nominated for Academy Award for Documentary Short Subject
Inside Fighting Russia
Voice of Action	James Beveridge	Watch online

==== 1943 ====
Title	Director	Notes
100,000 Cadets	Nicholas Read	
13 Platoon	Julian Roffman	
Action Stations	Joris Ivens	
A.R.P. in Schools		Training children about what to do in an air raid
Banshees Over Canada	James Beveridge	
Battle Is Our Business	Julian Roffman	
Battle Is Their Birthright	Stuart Legg	
Bombing the Nazis		
Buying Fever	Philip Ragan	
Canada - Workshop of Victory		
Canada's Youth Training Plan		
Coal Face, Canada	Robert Edmonds	
Corvette Port Arthur	Joris Ivens	
Coupon Value		
Curtailment of Civilian Industries	Philip Ragan	
Farm Front		
Farmers Forum		
First Aid in A.R.P.		
Fighting Dutch	Raymond Spottiswoode	Co-produced with Netherlands Information Bureau
Fighting Norway	Sydney Newman	
The Gates of Italy	Stuart Legg and Tom Daly	Watch online
Getting out the Coal		
Handle with Care	George L. George	
He Plants for Victory	Philip Ragan	Concerns Victory gardens
Industrial Workers		
Proudly She Marches	Jane Marsh	Watch online
The War for Men's Minds	Stuart Legg	Watch online

==== 1944 ====
Title	Director	Notes
According to Need	Dallas Jones	
Air Cadets	Jane Marsh	
Alaska Military Highway	Julian Roffman	
Back to Normal	George Dunning	Concerns life of war amputees
Balkan Powder Keg	Stuart Legg	
Battle of Europe	Stuart Legg, Tom Daly	
The Bayonet		
Break-through	James Beveridge	Watch online
Canadian Army Sing-Song No. 1	Don Baker, B.K. Blake	
Canadian Blood Saves Lives on All Fronts		
Keep Your Mouth Shut	Norman McLaren	Narrated by Lorne Greene (unconfirmed)
Fortress Japan	Stuart Legg	
Infantry - Pride of the Army	Dan Wallace	
Road to the Reich	Tom Daly	
Target: Berlin	Ernest Borneman	
Train Busters		
Trans-Canada Express	Stanley Hawes	Watch online
Zero Hour	Stuart Legg	

==== 1945 ====
Title	Director	Notes
John Bull's Own Island	Stuart Legg	
Headline Hunters		

=== India ===
Year	Title	Director	Notes
1940	He's in the Navy	George Radcliffe-Genge	
1940	The Planes of Hindusthan	George Radcliffe-Genge	
1941	V for Victory	Bibhuti Mitra	
1941	Voice of Satan	Ezra Mir	
1941	Road to Victory	Ezra Mir	
1941	In Self-Defence	Pittamandalam Venktatachalapathy Pathy	
1942	The Golden Grain of Bharatkhand	Pittamandalam Venktatachalapathy Pathy	
1943	Home Front	Pittamandalam Venktatachalapathy Pathy	

== United States ==
The United States possessed the largest film industry of any of the Allied powers during the war, making Hollywood a central instrument for wartime propaganda. Due to its immense size and vast scale, there was no single governmental or semi-governmental agency that centrally controlled it. Instead, the Office of War Information co-ordinated efforts among many entities to produce propaganda:

OCIAA: Office of the Coordinator of Inter-American Affairs

OEM: Office for Emergency Management

OSS: Office of Strategic Services

USAAF: United States Army Air Forces

USASC: U.S. Army Signal Corps

USASSD: U.S. Army Special Service Division

USDA: United States Department of Agriculture

USDT: United States Department of Treasury

USN: United States Navy

USDW: United States Department of War

WACMPI: War Activities Committee of the Motion Pictures Industry

Several of these films, although they have propaganda value, were used as training films for the United States armed forces.

=== 1941 ===
Pre-December films given IMDb release date where available.

Title	Director	Agencies or Organizations involved	Notes
Aluminum		WACMPI	
America Builds Ships		WACMPI; OPM	Released June 5
America Preferred		WACMPI; USDT	Released 20 May
Army in Overalls		WACMPI; OPM	Released June 5
Bits and Pieces		WACMPI; OPM	Released June 5
Defense Review No. 1		WACMPI	
Defense Review No. 2		WACMPI	
Men and Ships		WACMPI; BPI	Released June 23
Pots to Planes		WACMPI; OEM	Released November 22
Power for Defense		WACMPI; NDC	Released February 18
Preflight Inspection of the B-17E		USASC; UASAAF	War Department Training Film 1-532
Red Cross Trailer		WACMPI;	
Where Do We Go?		WACMPI; USO	Released May 28
Women in Defense		WACMPI; OEM	Released May 28; narrated by Katharine Hepburn; written by Eleanor Roosevelt

=== 1942 ===
Title	Director	Agencies or Organizations involved	Notes
Africa, Prelude to Victory		OWI	
The Arm Behind the Army		USASC	
Ring of Steel		OEM	Recruiting short, narrated by Spencer Tracy, released April 7
The Battle of Midway	John Ford	USN, WACMPI	Academy Award for Documentary Feature 1942*
Campus on the March		OWI	
Colleges at War			
Defense Review No. 3			
Fighting the Fire Bomb			
Fuel Conservation			
Hemp for Victory	Raymond Evans	USDA	
Henry Browne, Farmer		USDA	Nominated for an Academy Award for Documentary Short Subject
Hitler--Dead or Alive	Nick Grinde		
Homes for Defense			
How to Fly the B-24D Airplane			
Introduction to the P-39			
It's Everybody's War		OWI	Nominated for an Academy Award for Documentary Short Subject
Japanese Relocation		WACMPI; OWI	Japanese American internment
Keep 'Em Rolling			
Keeping Fit			
Lake Carrier			
Manpower		OWI	
Mister Gardenia Jones		OWI	Nominated for an Academy Award for Documentary Short Subject
Morgenthau Trailer			
Night Shift			Starring Danny Kaye
Why We Fight:Prelude to War	Frank Capra	USASSD; USASC	Academy Award for Documentary Feature 1942*
Safeguarding Military Information	Preston Sturges	AMPAS	
Salvage			
Servicing P-39: Bore Sighting All Guns			
Sex Hygiene	John Ford	USASC	
Tanks			
Training Women For War Production		NYA	Narrated by Eleanor Roosevelt
Torpedo Squadron	John Ford	USN	
U.S. Coast Guard			
United China Relief			
Vigilance			
Winning Your Wings	John Huston; Owen Crump (uncredited)	USAAF	Starring James Stewart; Nominated for an Academy Award for Documentary Short Subject
The World at War	Lowell Mellett	OWI	
Wood for War	Arthur H. Wolf	USDT	
Your Air Raid Warden			
Your American Tragedy			

- The 1942 Academy Award for Best Documentary, whose time frame included part of 1943, was split among four films, including the two seen here. Also, that year saw the amalgamation of the feature and short subject documentary categories into a single category.

=== 1943 ===
Title	Director	Agencies or Organizations involved	Notes
A Challenge to Democracy		OWI; OSS; WRA	Concerns Japanese American internment
GI Bill of Rights		Army-Navy Screen Magazine	
Air Support		USN	
At the Front		OWI; WACMPI	
American Saboteur		USDA; USFS; WACMPI	
The Autobiography of a 'Jeep'	Joseph Krumgold (uncredited)	OWI	
Brazil at War		OWI; OIAA	
British Torpedo Plane Tactics		USN; Walt Disney Pictures	
Basic Electricity, As Applied to Electronic Control Systems		USN; Walt Disney Pictures	
Black Marketing	William Castle	OWI; WACMPI	
Brothers in Blood		WACMPI	
Chief Neeley Reports to the Nation		WACMPI; USN	Concerns women's auxiliary, WAVES
Combat America		USAF	Narrated by Clark Gable
Community Transportation		OWI; WACMPI	
Customs of the Service		USASC	
Day of Battle		OWI; WACMPI	
December 7th	John Ford, Gregg Toland	USN; USDW	Won an Academy Award for Documentary Short Subject
Destination Island X		USN; WACMPI	
Ditching: Before and After		USAF	
Dive Bombing		USAF	
Doctors at War		OWI; WACMPI	
Education for Death- The Making Of The Nazi	Clyde Geronimi		Based on the non-fiction book of the same name by American author Gregor Ziemer. This film is by The Walt Disney Company, and the characters speak German
Family Feud		WACMPI	
Farmer at War		OWI; WACMPI	
The First Motion Picture Unit		USAAF	
Flying the P-39		USAAF	
Food and Magic		OWI; WACMPI	
Food for Fighters		OWI; WACMPI	
German Industrial Manpower		OSS	
Handling Aviation Gasoline in the Field		USAAF	
His New World		OWI;	Narrated by Spencer Tracy
How to Fly the B-17		USAAF	
How to Fly the P-47		USAAF	
How to Operate Behind Enemy Lines		OSS	
How to Shoot a Rifle		USAAF	
Kill or Be Killed		USA	
Materials Handling in AAF Depots		USAAF	
Message from Malta		OWI; WACMPI	
Mission Accomplished		OWI; WACMPI	
Negro Colleges in War Time		WACMPI; OWI	
No Exceptions		WACMPI; OWI	
Oil Fires, Their Prevention and Extinguishment		USAAF	
Oil Is Blood		WACMPI; OWI	
Operation of C-1 Autopilot		USAAF	
Our Enemy- The Japanese		USN; OWI	
P-38 Flight Characteristics	S.C. Burden	USAAF	
Paratroops		WACMPI; OWI	
Recognition of the Japanese Zero Fighter	Bernard Vorhaus	First Motion Picture Unit, United States Army Air Forces; OWI	Starring Ronald Reagan
Reconnaissance Pilot		USAAF	
Report from the Aleutians	John Huston	WACMPI; USASC	Nominated for an Academy Award for Documentary Feature
Right of Way		WACMPI; OWI	
Servicing P-39:Procedure for Uncrating		USAAF	
Servicing P-39: Synchronizing .50 Caliber Fuselage Guns		USAAF	
The Sikorsky Helicopter		USAAF	
Since Pearl Harbor		WACMPI; American Red Cross	Wartime activities of the Red Cross
Suckerbait		USA	Caution against Nazi spies
Suggestion Box		WACMPI; OWI	
Tank Convoy			
Three Cities		OWI	
To the People of the United States	Arthur Lubin	PHS	Nominated for an Academy Award for Documentary Short Subject
Tomorrow We Fly		USN	Nominated for an Academy Award for Best Documentary (Short Subject)
The Tree in a Test Tube	Charles McDonald	USDA	Laurel and Hardy short about use of wood in the war effort
Troop Train		WACMPI; OWI	
Turbosupercharger: Flight Operation		USAAF	
Turbosupercharger: Master of the Skies		USAAF	
Uncrating and Assembly of the P-47 Thunderbolt Airplane		USAAF	
War Department Report	Carl Marzani	OSS	Nominated for an Academy Award for Documentary Feature
War Town		WACMPI; OWI	
Wartime Nutrition		WACMPI; OWI	
We've Never Been Licked	John Rawlins	Texas A&M University	Features William Frawley of I Love Lucy as a Japanese agent
When Work Is Done		OWI	
Why We Fight:The Nazis Strike	Frank Capra	USASSD; USASC	
Why We Fight:Divide and Conquer	Frank Capra	USASSD; USASC	
Why We Fight:The Battle of Britain	Frank Capra	USASSD; USASC	
Why We Fight:The Battle of Russia	Frank Capra	USASSD; USASC	Nominated for an Academy Award for Documentary Feature
Wings Up		OWI; WACMPI; First Motion Picture Unit, United States Army Air Forces	Narrated by Clark Gable
You, John Jones!	Mervyn LeRoy	WACMPI;	Dramatic short starring James Cagney

=== 1944 ===
Title	Director	Agencies or Organizations involved	Notes
The 957th Day		USN; OWI	
America's Hidden Weapon		WACMPI; OWI	
The Articles of War		USASC	
At His Side		WACMPI; ARC	Activities of the Red Cross for that year
Attack in the Pacific			
Attack! Battle of New Britain	Robert Presnell Sr.		
The B-17 'Flying Fortress': Elementary Ground Work		USAAF	
B-29 Flight Procedure and Combat Crew Functioning		USAAF	
The Battle for the Marianas		USDW; WACMPI	
Battle Stations		USCG; WACMPI	Concerns women's Coast guard auxiliary, SPARS
Fighting Americans	Max Dresner	Toddy Pictures Co.	Race film made in co-operation with the US Govt.
The Fighting Lady	Edward Steichen	USN	Won an Academy Award for Documentary Feature
Freedom Comes High	Lewis Allen	USN	Dramatic short
Gracias Amigos		OIAA	Latin American contributions to the war effort
Highballing to Victory		APSC; WACMPI	
How to Fly the B-25		USN; WACMPI	
How to Fly the B-26 Airplane		USN; WACMPI	
Hymn of the Nations	Alexander Hammid	OWI	nominated for an Academy Award for Documentary Short Subject
It Can't Last		USN;	
It's Murder		WACMPI	
It's Your War Too		WACMPI; USDW; USASC	Concerns women's Army auxiliary WACS
Liberation of Rome		APS; OWI; WACMPI; British Service Units	
Land and Live in the Jungle		USAAF	
Memo for Joe	Richard Fleischer	WACMPI	
Memphis Belle: A Story of a Flying Fortress	William Wyler	First Motion Picture Unit, United States Army Air Forces	
Motion Pictures on the Fighting Front			
Movies at War		USDW; WACMPI	
The Negro Soldier	Stuart Heisler	USDW; WACMPI	
No Alternative		WACMPI; OWI	
One Inch from Victory			
The Price of Rendova		USA; WACMPI	
Report from the Front		OWI	Narrated by Humphrey Bogart
Report to Judy		WACMPI; OWI	Concerns the women's naval auxiliary WAVES
Return to Guam		USN	
Road to Victory	LeRoy Prinz	WACMPI	
Supervising Women Workers		USOE	
Target: Japan		USN; WACMPI	
Tunisian Victory	Frank Capra and Hugh Stewart	USASC; British Service Units	
The War Speeds Up			
What Makes a Battle		USAPS (with co-operation of USASC, USN, USMC etc.)	
Why of Wartime Taxes		WACMPI; OWI	
Why We Fight: The Battle of China	Frank Capra	USASSD; USASC	Second Sino-Japanese War
With the Marines at Tarawa	Louis Hayward	WACMPI; OWI	Authentic footage of the Battle of Tarawa, filmed by the photographers of the 2nd Marine Division; won an Academy Award for Documentary Short Subject

=== 1945 ===
Title	Director	Agencies or Organizations involved	Notes
6th Marine Division on Okinawa		USMC	Battle of Okinawa
Airborne Lifeboat		USAAF	
Air Force Report	Carl Marzani	OSS	
Airborne Lifeboat		USAAF	
The All-Star Bond Rally	Michael Audley	USDT; WACMPI;	
The Army Nurse		APS;USASC;USDW	
The Atom Strikes!		APS;USASC;USDW	Atomic bombings of Hiroshima and Nagasaki
The Battle of San Pietro	John Huston	WACMPI; APS	Battle of San Pietro Infine
Birth of the B-29		APS;AAF;USDW	
Brought to Action		USN;WACMPI	
Bulletin on the Okinawa Operation		USMC	Battle of Okinawa
Carriers Hit Tokyo!	Ed Herlihy	Universal Studios	5 min. 19 s, archive.org
D-Day: The Normandy Invasion			Operation Overlord
D-Day -1			Operation Overlord
Death Mills	Billy Wilder	USASC	Holocaust
The Enemy Strikes		WACMPI; APS	Battle of the Bulge
The Fight for the Sky		WACMPI;USAAF	Air war over Europe; Narrated by Ronald Reagan
The Fleet That Came to Stay	Budd Boetticher	WACMPI; OWI	Battle of Okinawa
Fury in the Pacific		WACMPI; USA; USN; USMC	
Glamour Gal		USMC	Artillery in the Battle of Iwo Jima
Here is Germany	Frank Capra		Occupation orientation
Hollywood Victory Caravan	William D. Russell	WACMPI; USDT	Hollywood USO
Intelligence and the Japanese Civilian		USMC	Occupation orientation
The Last Bomb	Frank Lloyd	USAAF	Operation Matterhorn; Nominated for Academy Award for Documentary Feature
Know Your Enemy: Japan	Frank Capra and Joris Ivens		
Mr. and Mrs. America		USDT	Bond drive
My Japan		USDT	
The Negro Sailor	Henry Levin	USN	
Okinawa Bulletin #2: Final Phases		USMC	Battle of Okinawa
On to Tokyo		WACMPI; APS	
Our Job in Japan		WACMPI; APS	
Pearl Harbor Payback			Air Force dogfights and B-29 raids on Japan
Remember These Faces		USN; USCG; USMC	Wounded in Action marines and sailors in the Pacific
Seeing Them Through		WACMPI; American Red Cross	Activities of the Red Cross the previous year
The Ship That Wouldn't Die			
Story with Two Endings	Lee Strasberg		
The Stilwell Road		USASC; British and Indian film units	Narrated by Ronald Reagan
The Story of the 14th Air Force		Photographers of the 14th Air Force	The Flying Tigers
Target Tokyo		USAAF	
Target Invisible		DOT	The use of Radar in the War
Time to Kill		USAAF; USN	
To the Shores of Iwo Jima		OWI; WACMPI	Nominated for Academy Award for Documentary Short Subject
The Town	Josef von Sternberg	OWI; WACMPI	
Tuesday in November	John Houseman	OWI; WACMPI	
The True Glory	Garson Kanin and Carol Reed	OWI; British Ministry of Information	Won Academy Award for Documentary Feature
Two Down and One to Go	Frank Capra	WACMPI; USAPS	
The Two-Way Street		WACMPI	About the Lend-Lease program
Watchtower Over Tomorrow	John Cromwell	OWI; WACMPI	Concerns Dumbarton Oaks and the founding of the UN
Why We Fight:War Comes to America	Frank Capra	USASSD; USASC	
Wings for This Man		USAAF	About the Tuskegee Airmen. Narrated by Ronald Reagan
Your Job In Germany	Frank Capra	USAAF	Written by Dr. Seuss. Concerns occupation of Germany

=== 1946 ===
Title	Director	Agencies or Organizations involved	Notes
A Tale of Two Cities		USDW; Army-Navy Screen Magazine	Atomic bombings of Hiroshima and Nagasaki
That Justice Be Done	George Stevens	OWI; OSS; WACMPI	Nuremberg Trials
Seeds of Destiny	Gene Fowler Jr.	USDW; UNRRA	Asks public for humanitarian aid to post-war Europe and Asia
Special Delivery		USDW; Army-Navy Screen Magazine	Operation Crossroads (the atomic tests bombings on Bikini Atoll)

=== 1947 ===
Title	Director	Agencies or Organizations involved	Notes
Don't Be a Sucker		USDW	Anti-intolerance film
Thunderbolt!	William Wyler	USDW	About US airstrikes in Italy; introduced by Jimmy Stewart

=== Year uncertain ===
Title	Director	Agencies or Organizations involved	Notes
Know Your Ally: Britain		OWI; USASC	
Victory Gardens		USDA	

== Netherlands and Belgium ==
The Low Countries were overrun by Nazi Germany in the May–June 1940 blitzkrieg. The Dutch East Indies, the Netherlands most important colony, was conquered by Japan in early 1942. However each had a government in exile which set up the Belgian Ministry of Information and Netherlands Information Bureau, which produced the following films. There were also films made by the resistance while the respective countries were occupied.

Year	Title	Director	Agency	Notes
1941	Belgique toujours	Hippolyte De Kempeneer	Belgian resistance movement	Dutch title: Immer België; English title Forever Belgium
1942	Little Belgium		Belgian Ministry of Information	Nominated for Academy Award for Documentary Short Subject
1942	People of the Indies		Netherlands Information Bureau	
1942	Holland in the Western Hemisphere		Netherlands Information Bureau	
1942	High Stakes in the East		Netherlands Information Bureau	
1942	The Dutch Next Door		Netherlands Information Bureau	
1943	Glorious Colours	Alfred Travers	Netherlands Information Bureau	

== Soviet Union ==
In the Soviet Union, unless otherwise noted, the Central Newsreel Studio produced these films.

Year	Title	Director	Original title	Note
1941	For the Front	Gurgen Balasanyan	Razmatchakati hamar	Produced by Armkinokhronika
1941	Fascist Boots Shall Not Trample Our Motherland	A.Ivanov & I.Vano	Не топтать фашистскому сапогу НАШЕЙ РОДИНЫ	Produced by Soyuzmultfilm
1942	Day of War	Mikhail Slutsky	День войны/Den voiny	
1942	Leningrad in Combat	Roman Karmen	Ленинград в борьбе/Leningrad v borbe	
1942	Crushing Defeat of the German Troops under Moscow	Ilya Kopalin	Разгром немецких войск под Москвой	
1943	Ukraine in Flames	Aleksandr Dovzhenko & Yuliya Solntseva	Битва за нашу Советскую Украину	
1943	The People's Avengers	Vasili Belayev	Народные мстители/Narodniye mstiteli	
1943	Stalingrad	Leonid Varlamov		
1943	The City That Stopped Hitler: Heroic Stalingrad			Narrated by Brian Donlevy
1943	In the Sands of Central Asia	Aleksandr Zguridi	В песках Средней Азии/V peskakh Sredney Azii	
1943	Przysiegamy ziemi polskiej	Aleksander Ford		Title in Polish
1944	Sons of Armenia	Gurgen Balasanyan	Hayastani zavaknere	Produced by Armkinokhronika
1944	K voprosu o peremirii s Finlyandiey	Yuli Raizman		Produced by Sojuzintorgkino Studios
1945	Fall of Berlin – 1945	Yuli Raizman & Yelizaveta Svilova	Битва за Берлин 1945 г.	
1945	Victory in the Ukraine and the Expulsion of the Germans from the Boundaries of the Ukrainian Soviet Earth	Aleksandr Dovzhenko & Yelizaveta Svilova	Pobeda na Pravoberezhnoi Ukraine i izgnaniye nemetsikh zakhvatchikov za predeli Ukrainskikh sovietskikh zemel	
1945	The Rout of Japan	Iosif Kheifits	Razgrom Yaponii	

The Nuremberg Trials

=== Soviet films made for foreign markets ===
In addition to the above, the Soviet cinema distributing company, Artkino, produced the following for foreign markets.

Year	Title	Director	Note
1942	Our Russian Front	Joris Ivens & Lewis Milestone	Narrated by Walter Huston
1942	Moscow Strikes Back	Ilya Kopalin & Leonid Varlamov	Narrated by Edward G. Robinson. One of four winners at the 15th Academy Awards for Best Documentary Feature.
1943	Russians at War		
1947	The Nuremberg Trials	C Svilov	Soviet view of the Nuremberg Trials

== See also ==
- List of films made in the Third Reich
- List of Holocaust films
- List of World War II films
