= Watchtower Over Tomorrow =

- Directed by: John Cromwell, Harold F. Kress, Elia Kazan (uncredited), Alfred Hitchcock
- Written by: Ben Hecht, Karl Lamb
- Produced by: Jerome S. Bresler, Robert Riskin
- Narrated by: John Nesbitt
- Cinematography: Lester White
- Production company: United States Office of War Information
- Distributed by: War Activities Committee of the Motion Pictures Industry
- Release date: March 29, 1945
- Running time: 10 minutes
- Country: United States
- Language: English

Watchtower Over Tomorrow is a short documentary film meant to educated the public about the United Nations, the Dumbarton Oaks Conference, and the proposed post-war order.

== Synopsis ==
The short begins with a scene of a large cannon which shoots an explosive projectile. "Death from the sky" the narration begins, "fired by an enemy thousands of miles away" that could begin World War III. (The sequence is taken from the H. G. Wells film Things to Come). It was to prevent such a thing that Allied troops had fought on the many fronts and theatres of World War II, so that the post war world would not just be another interlude between wars. Stock footage is then shown of happy children at play, until a shot of a small child playing with his toy train is revealed to be sitting next to two grieving parents with a portrait of a soldier and a Western Union telegraph. "Why can't we organize a world where people can just live in peace?" the narrator asks.

The scene then transitions to the interior of a bus where a man (veteran character actor Grant Mitchell) is reading a newspaper about the Dumbarton Oaks conference. A fellow passenger (Lionel Stander) looks over his should and asks "What gives with this Dumbarton Oaks business?" The reader responds that it is a conference of the four great powers to create an organization to prevent future wars. The man looking over his shoulder is skeptical, as there was alot of talk about that after the last war, and it didn't work out. The person with the newspaper responds that this new organization will prevent wars and root out the causes of war. The narrator interrupts, stating that while the man with the newspaper has the general idea, preventing war is a very complex business. The idea began during Theodore Roosevelt's time during the Hague Conference, then with Woodrow Wilson's League of Nations. However people were not ready to support such an endeavor to prevent war and eventually aggressions such as the Anschluss of Austria occurred. After the failure of appeasement, the then contemporary Second World War began. Now that it was coming to an end, leaders of the "peace loving" nations were working to create a new post-war world order on the basis of the Atlantic Charter, the Declaration by United Nations, and further conferences and documents that had been agree to during the war, culminating in the United Nations Conference on International Organization.

The short envisions how the organization will work, with a general assembly and security council meeting to solve issues between countries as well as specialized agencies dedicated to food and agriculture, cultural relations, labor, trade, communications and currency stabilization. The work of these specialized agencies would root out the causes of war.

However, what happens when another country refuses to abide by these rules? The over the shoulder passenger asks. What if another Hitler comes? The film then proceeds to show the drama of a potential "country X" whose delegate (Martin Kosleck, a German actor who often played Nazis) leaves the organization. In this case the other countries act to cut off communication and trade with the aggressor, and if necessary the Military Staff Committee may be called in to act. The man watching over the others shoulder states that its just like in the neighborhood, if someone starts trouble, they call in the police to stop trouble before it starts. The man with the newspaper agrees, it is quite simple when you put it like that, it should have been done a long time ago.

== Production and reception ==
The film had its preview screening in New York on March 25, 1945. It is unclear if the film ever had a general distribution, however. It is known that Secretary Edward Stettinius Jr. had called for the film to be recalled shortly after its first premier, because it stated that each country would have one vote in the general assembly, while the Soviet Union was then insisting on extra seats for its constituent republics. It had been slated to be shown in 10,000 theatres before the San Francisco conference. It is known that a radio version of the story, Watchtower for Tomorrow narrated by Edward G. Robinson and Harold Stassen was played during the conferences opening ceremonies on April 25.

The exact identity of the films crew has been a matter of dispute, as the film had no credits. The notice in Variety on April 4, 1945 lists Ben Hecht and Karl Lamb as writers and John Cromwell and Harold F. Kress as directors. Alfred Hitchcock is sometimes credited as director and he at least took part in its planning and preparation. Elia Kazan is also mentioned as a possible director.

== See also ==
- List of Allied propaganda films of World War II
- Now — The Peace - National Film Board of Canada short on the same subject
