= Manpower (1942 film) =

1942 American propaganda film

- Written by: Paul V. McNutt
- Produced by: Office of War Information
- Music by: Gail Kubik
- Distributed by: War Activities Committee of the Motion Picture Industry
- Release date: October 29, 1942
- Running time: 10 minutes
- Country: United States
- Language: English

Manpower is a 1942 American short propaganda film produced by the US Office of War Information and written by Paul V. McNutt. Made early shortly after America's entry into World War II, the film addresses the problems associated with the labor market adjusting for war time, such as people with the wrong skills rushing to a town looking for war work, and labor shortages in essential industries.

== Plot summary ==
The film discusses how the Roosevelt administration dealt with the labor market problem by the establishment of the Federal Employment Commission, which brought together representatives from labor, management, and the military to organize war production effectively, the test case being in the city of Baltimore.

In spite of this action, there were labor shortages, and people had to be taken from other occupations and put into war work. Different examples are given and briefly dramatized:

- a man who has seniority working in a white collar profession is promised his position back when he returns to work after the war
- small businessmen are persuaded to sell their shops and go into war production
- negroes are taken from menial jobs like custodians, and put to work welding
- women are taken from domestic life and put in to work that is adjusted for "feminine muscles" (the film points out that taking a job doesn't affect their husbands' draft status)
- women with small children will have access to day care

Finally, a few more possibilities are noted, but left undramatized, such as retired people coming back to work, the handicapped are recruited and America's "youth" going into agricultural labor. It is noted that these youth programs are voluntary, but it's possible that the government could make youth participation mandatory.

== Cast ==
- Paul V. McNutt as himelf

== See also ==
- List of Allied propaganda films of World War II
- United States home front during World War II
