= Bombing the Nazis =

- Title frame
- Narrated by: Lionel Gamlin
- Production company: National Film Board of Canada
- Distributed by: National Film Board of Canada; Columbia Pictures of Canada
- Release date: 1943
- Running time: 10 minutes
- Country: Canada
- Language: English

Bombing the Nazis is a 10-minute 1943 Canadian documentary film, made by the National Film Board of Canada (NFB) as part of the World War II newsreels shown at theatres in Canada and abroad. The film describes the Allied air war over Europe during the Second World War, concentrating on attacks in 1942 and 1943 on an automobile factory in Vichy France.

== Synopsis ==
After the French capitulation in 1940, Nazi Germany, with the compliance of the Vichy government, took control of Louis Renault's factories. In prewar France, The Renault Billancourt factory in Paris employed over 30,000 workers and had produced a line of automobiles. The Renault plant, subsequently, began to build trucks, tanks and aero engines for the Axis war effort.

In 1942, the Royal Air Force (RAF) launched a massive low-level bombing raid at the Billancourt plant, the largest number of bombers in a single mission to that point in the war. The Renault factory and surrounding area including a B.F. Goodrich tire plant, was severely damaged, along with heavy civilian casualties. When the Renault factory was rebuilt in 1943, the United States Army Air Forces (USAAF) stationed in England, launched another raid by Boeing B-17 Flying Fortress bombers, causing further destruction.

The USAAF began building up its air forces in Europe, with the Boeing B-17 introduced as one of prime Allied weapons in the air war. The B-17 Flying Fortress was a four-engine heavy bomber aircraft, with a crew of 10. The heavily armed B-17 was flying high-altitude daylight formation missions and bombing with precision due to the use of a secret Norden bombsight. While the RAF concentrate on night bombing, as more B-17s arrive, an intense round-the-clock bombing campaign against Nazi-occupied Europe begins.

== Production ==
Bombing the Nazis was part of the wartime morale-boosting propaganda newsreels using the format of a compilation documentary, relying heavily on newsreel material. The film also incorporated combat footage from both the RAF and USAAF film units, as well as a sequence that was obtained from French sources showing the devastation of the Renault factory and the nearby residential area. (Note: Due to the unfamiliarity with the B-17, the narrator makes a number of technical errors including the size of the crew and identifying the armament on the bomber as Lewis guns.)

== Reception ==
Bombing the Nazis was shot in 35 mm, for theatrical showing both in England and Canada as a newsreel accompanying feature films. Each NFB film was shown over a six-month period as part of the shorts or newsreel segments in approximately 800 theatres across Canada. The NFB had an arrangement with Famous Players theatres to ensure that Canadians from coast-to-coast could see them, with further distribution by Columbia Pictures.

After the six-month theatrical tour ended, individual films were made available on 16 mm to schools, libraries, churches and factories, extending the life of these films for another year or two. They were also made available to film libraries operated by university and provincial authorities.

== See also ==
- Death by Moonlight: Bomber Command (1992)
- List of Allied propaganda films of World War II
