= Mission Accomplished (disambiguation) =

Mission Accomplished usually refers to the Mission Accomplished speech by US President George W. Bush.

Mission Accomplished may also refer to:

- Mission Accomplished, a 2004 BBC documentary by Sean Langan
- Mission Accomplished (film), a short 1943 US propaganda film
- "Mission Accomplished" (The Wire), the 12th and final episode of the third season of the HBO original series, The Wire
- Mission Accomplished ... But the Beat Goes On, a 1979 album by The Rezillos
- Mission Not Accomplished: How George Bush Lost the War on Terrorism, a 2004 book by William W. Turner
