= Food for Fighters =

1943 film

- Produced by: Office of War Information
- Distributed by: War Activities Committee of the Motion Picture Industry
- Release date: April 1, 1943
- Running time: 9 minutes
- Country: United States
- Language: English

Food for Fighters is a 1943 propaganda short about nutrition in the Armed Services produced by the Office of War Information.

The films open with a young conscript first getting weighed before going into the army. He asked what the soldiers will eat, but was dismissively told "Only beans." The narration then starts and informs the audience that since the last war, nutrition has become a science and there is even a whole Quartermaster Corp laboratory devoted to making more nutritious food for the armed services. Better food means better soldiers and even healthier civilians.

The eating habits of the national adversaries were scrutinized, including a claim that the Japanese produce great energy from rice. Various experiments with American food preparedness are made, including determining what foods would be most effective in certain climates.

The results from these tests led the army to create vitamin-enriched foods that would help maximize the energy gained from the given product.

== See also ==
- List of Allied propaganda films of World War II
