= The Price of Rendova =

1944 film

- Produced by: US Army Signal Corps
- Distributed by: Metro-Goldwyn-Mayer; War Activities Committee of the Motion Pictures Industry
- Release date: January 6, 1944
- Running time: 10 minutes
- Country: United States
- Language: English

The Price of Rendova is a 1944 propaganda film created by the US Army Signal Corps. It documents the Landings on Rendova and Munda in the Solomon Islands.

The film begins with an introduction by Robert Patterson, Under-Secretary of War, who informs the audience that the taking of the islands brings the military "that much closer to Japan" reminds them to keep up war production.

The naval task force is shown assembling at Guadalcanal, and maps are shown explaining the strategic importance of the island of Rendova, that it is taken in order to facilitate the operation against the air base at Munda. Once the amphibious vehicles land on the island, the marines are immediately attacked by Japanese snipers. The narrator tells us the island is covered with tall trees and the Japanese have perfected the art of sniping.

Emphasized throughout the film is the importance of the homefront in making the essential materials needed for war, the iron, rubber, medical supplies and other materiel that would have to be replaced by the working people back home. The dead and wounded are also graphically displayed, the narrator noting that some materiel can never be replaced.

== See also ==
- List of Allied Propaganda Films of World War 2
