= Glamour Girl =

Glamour Girl may refer to:

- Glamour Girl (1938 film), a 1938 British comedy film
- Glamour Girl (1948 film), a 1948 American film
- Glamour Girl (2000 film), a film starring Rohit Roy
- Glamour Girl (novel), a novel by Kerry Katona and Fanny Blake
- "Glamour Girl" (song), a song by Praga Khan
- Glamour girl, type of glamour photography

== See also ==
- Glamour Gal, a 1945 propaganda film
