= Black Marketing =

1943 dramatic propaganda short film directed by William Castle

- Directed by: William Castle
- Produced by: Office of War Information
- Distributed by: RKO Radio Pictures; War Activities Committee of the Motion Picture Industry
- Release date: August 19, 1943
- Running time: 10 minutes
- Country: United States
- Language: English

Black Marketing is an American 1943 dramatic propaganda documentary short produced by the United States Office of War Information and directed by William Castle. It is an educational film warning American civilians against buying unrationed foodstuffs and materials.

== Synopsis ==
The film opens in a courtroom with the prosecutor laying the government's case against a syndicate of racketeers with names like Joseph B. and Sam E. Once the prosecutor starts to go into the timeline of the case, the film dissolves into short segments showing the racketeers at work, how they organized themselves, bought up steers at inflated prices and forced butchers to distribute the illicit beef. They are caught, however, when one housewife is told that she can't buy a steak with her ration cards, but a woman after her does without them.

The butcher is taken by the OPA (Office of Price Administration) and interrogated. He is asked what his son in Africa would think if he knew his father were cavorting with saboteurs, and spills the beans about his accomplices. When the lawyer comes back, he looks to the audience and tells them that they too must not buy goods above the rationed price, and report it if they see it. A closing note tells the audience that everyone in the film is a law-abiding citizen who volunteered to act in the movie to educate the public about black marketing.

== See also ==
- List of Allied propaganda films of World War II
- United States home front during World War II
