= Mr. and Mrs. America =

1945 film

- Produced by: US Department of Treasury
- Release date: 1945
- Country: United States
- Language: English

Mr. and Mrs. America was a propaganda short produced by the US Department of Treasury in 1945 to urge citizens to buy and keep war bonds.

Mr. and Mrs. America contains a series of pre-taped messages from leading figures in American life, including Franklin D. Roosevelt, the presidents of the AFL, CIO, US Chamber of Commerce, and Secretary of the Treasury Henry Morgenthau Jr. In between these messages there are montages of various battle scenes, dead enemy soldiers, and wounded GIs. After the president of the Chamber of Commerce's message, there is a more optimistic montage of life in America after the war and a series of vignettes in which a cross section of the US population - a young woman, middle aged immigrant industrial worker, an African-American man, an elderly Admiral, etc. - explain what they will do with their bonds once the war is over, such as start a business or send their children to school. The film ends with an American GI (portrayed by Eddie Albert) asking the audience to buy bonds.

== See also ==
- List of Allied propaganda films of World War II
- United States home front during World War II
