= Since Pearl Harbor =

- Produced by: War Activities Committee of the Motion Pictures Industry
- Release date: November 18, 1943
- Running time: 10 minutes
- Country: United States
- Language: English

Since Pearl Harbor is a 1943 short documentary film commissioned by the United States Government during World War II. It is a "report to the American People" regarding the wartime activities of the American Red Cross since the Attack on Pearl Harbor.

== Archive ==
The Academy Film Archive preserved Since Pearl Harbor in 2009. The film is part of the Academy War Film Collection, one of the largest collections of World War II era short films held outside government archives.
