= Suggestion Box =

1943 film

- Produced by: Office of War Information
- Distributed by: War Activities Committee of the Motion Pictures Industry
- Release date: October 21, 1943
- Running time: 9 min
- Country: United States
- Language: English

Suggestion Box is a short propaganda film produced in 1943 by the Office of War Information. Its purpose was to encourage workers to send in suggestions for more effective war production.

The film opens with a standard factory suggestion box and the many workers who slip pieces of paper in it as they walk by. The suggestions are then gathered and sent to Washington DC where a board of experts examines each one to find its merits for more efficient and speedy war production. A few examples are given:

- a worker who was working on iron tubes finds a way to increase his production by lining them up all together
- a black janitor suggests a way to save oil from being spilled
- and a woman uses her Grandmother's method of button making to make better rivets.

Some of these people whose ideas are taken up by the committee are given awards for helping war production.

The film's message to use suggestion boxes was also spread through propaganda posters at the time.

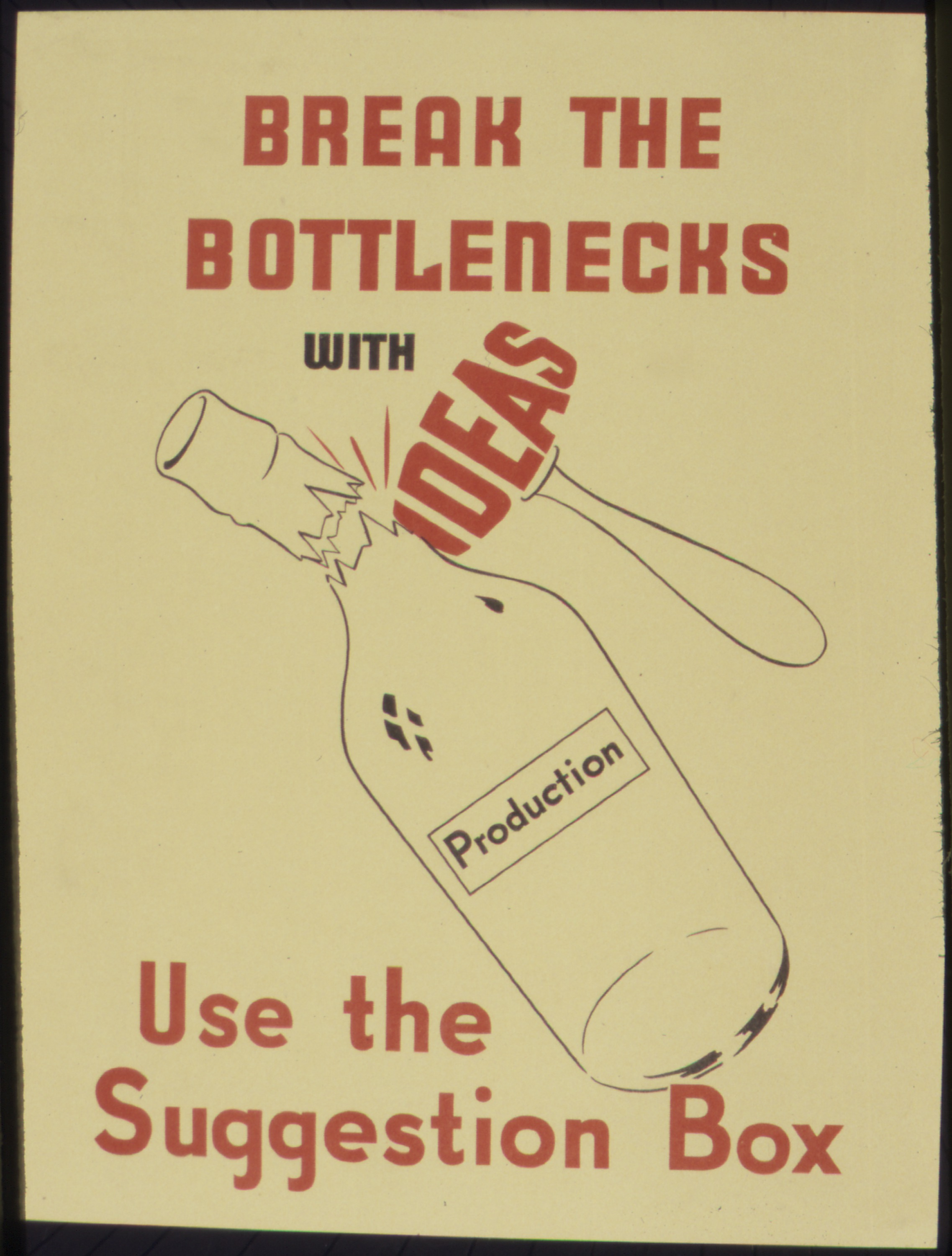
Propaganda poster, 1942–43

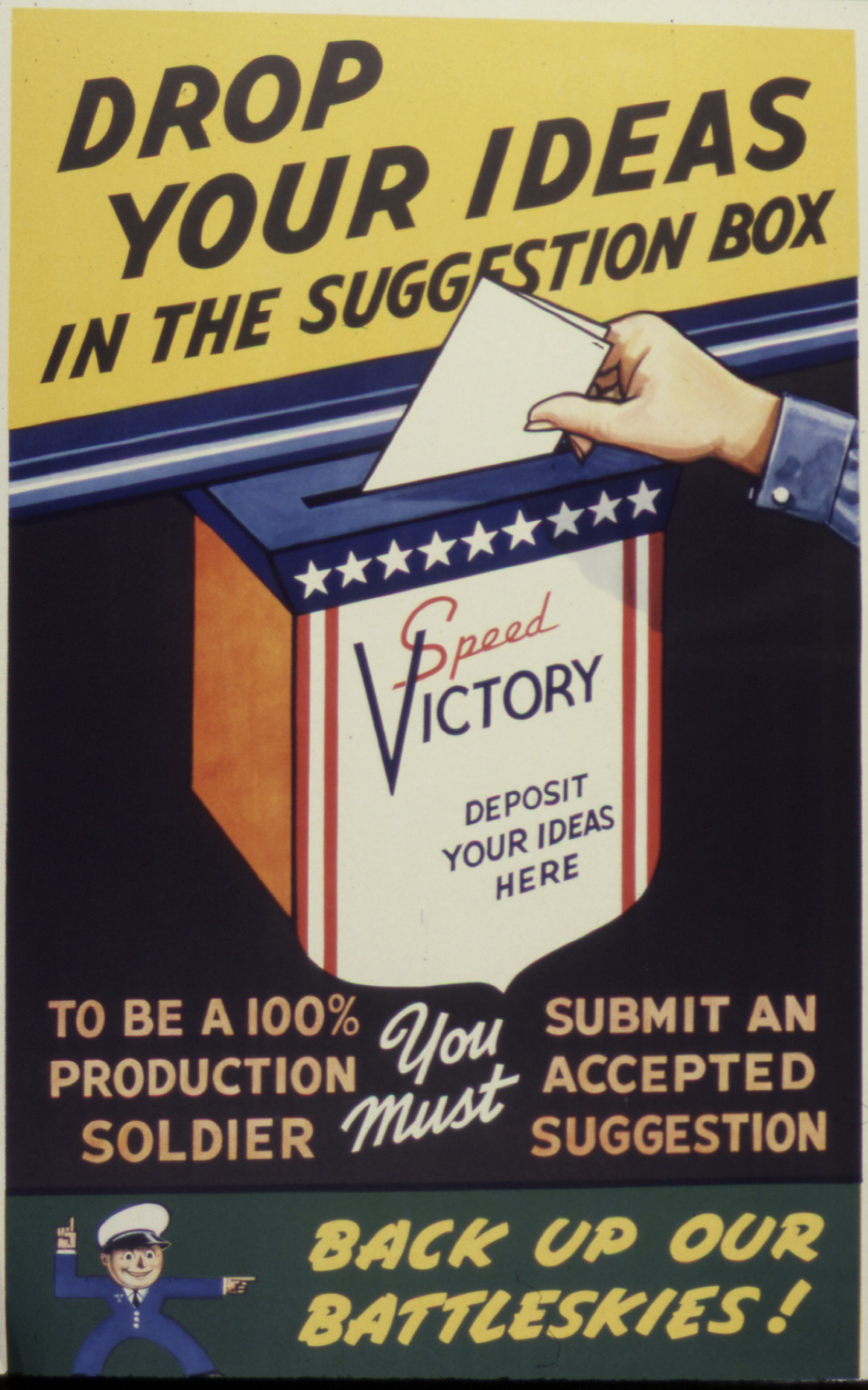
Propaganda poster, 1942

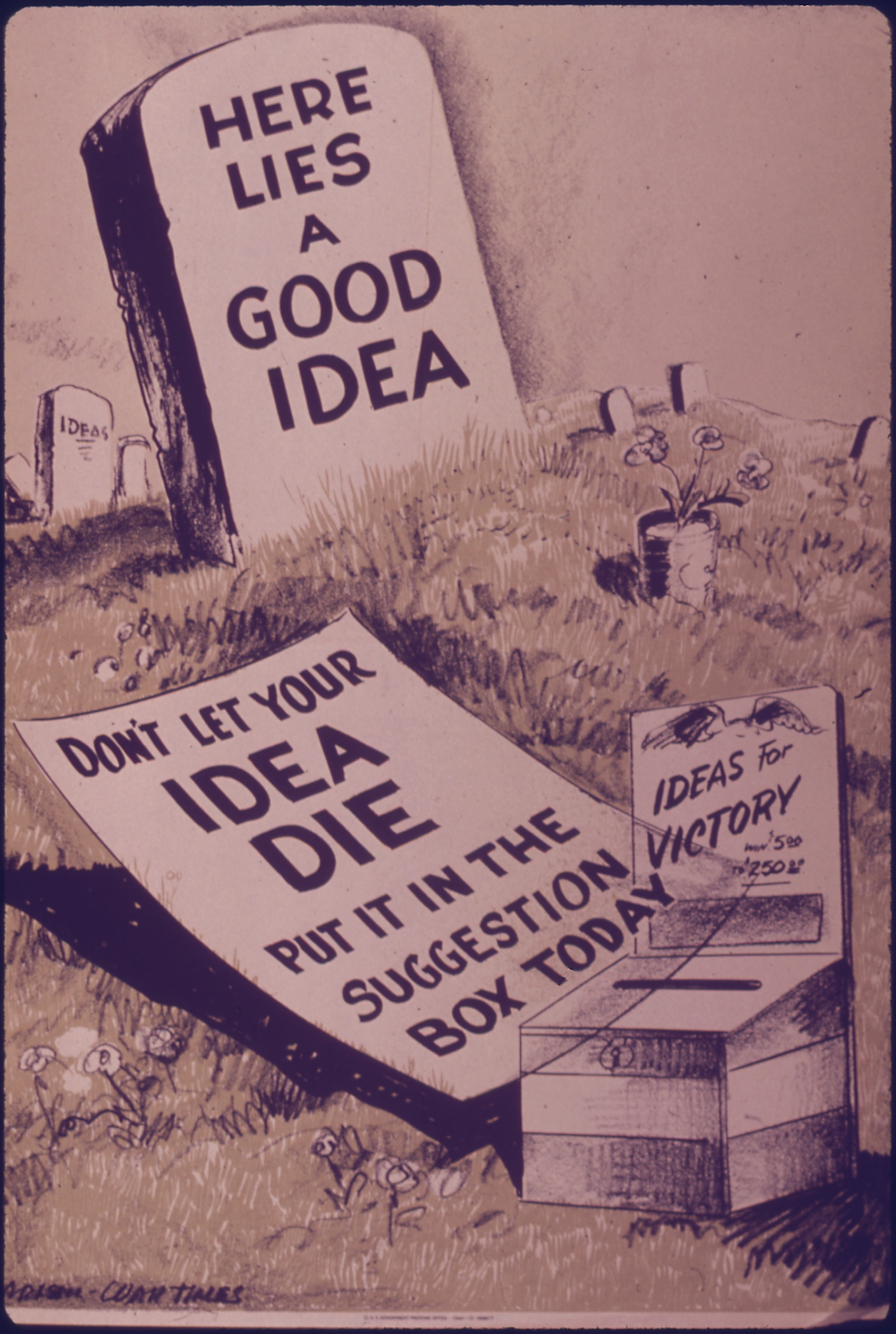
Propaganda poster, 1943

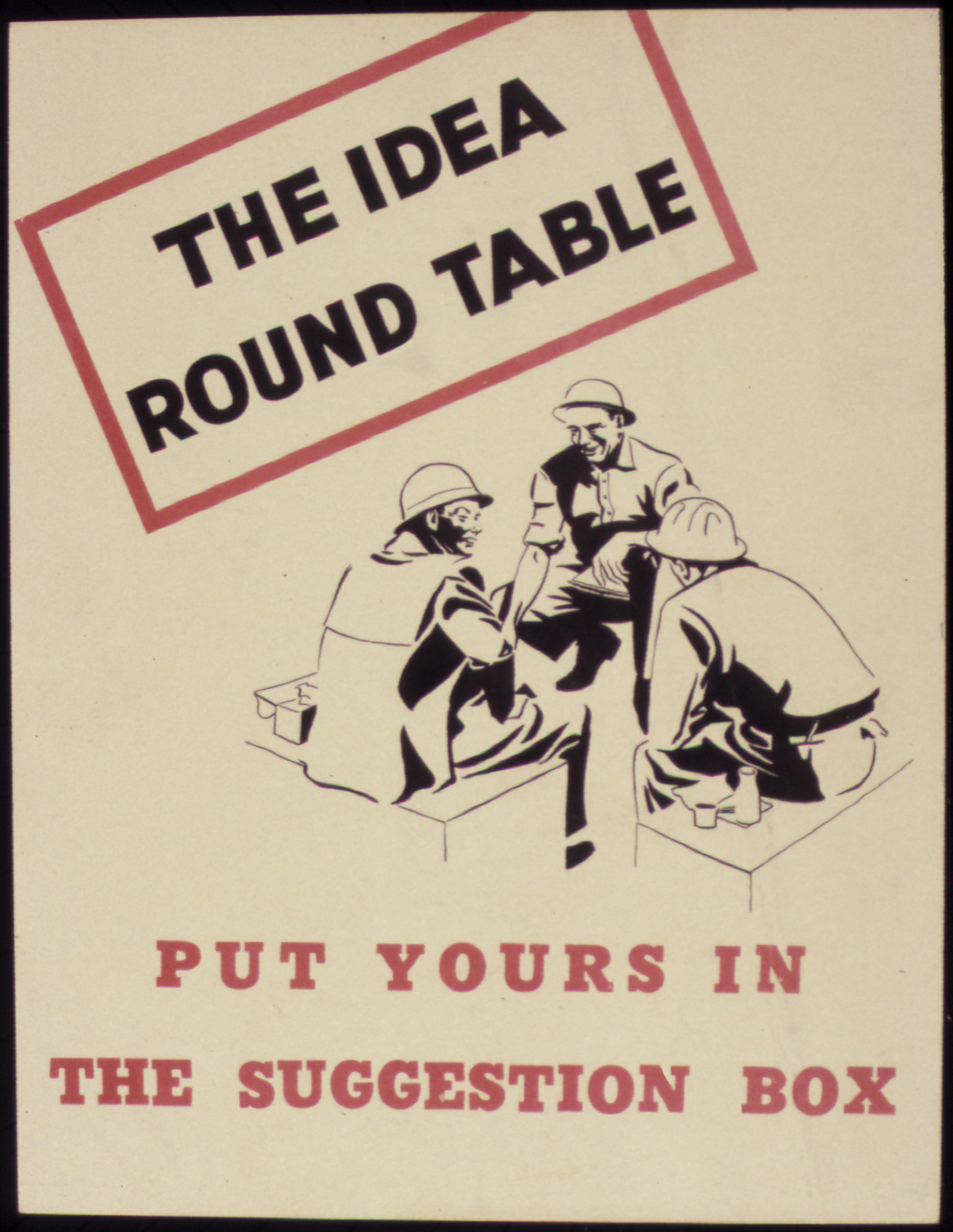
Propaganda poster, 1942–43
