= What Makes a Battle =

1944 film

- Produced by: US Army Pictorial Service
- Release date: 1944
- Country: United States
- Language: English

What Makes a Battle was a propaganda short produced by the US Army Pictorial Service in 1944. It documents the taking of the Marshall Islands while also encouraging increased war production.

The film opens with the narrator asking "What makes a battle?" while the camera is focusing on shipments of industrial transports, "This is what it takes to make a battle." This statement sets up the dual nature of the entire film. War supplies are pouring in from every part of the country, from every type of American "Republican and Democrat, white and colored." Industrial production is the backbone of war, according to the film, if it is destroyed, not made with quality, or not replaced in time, the battle cannot happen.

Then the film abruptly changes direction, and presents a summary of the American battle plan for taking the Marshalls, how the outer islands were bombed to fool the enemy, and how a sneak attack was planned against the inner islands. But this couldn't happen until all the supplies were ready. When the invasion does begin there is fierce fighting on the main islands. "The German would have surrendered, but not the Jap...Out of a garrison of 6000, 230 surrender." Much time is spent on the Japanese POWs, and the film goes to great lengths to show how well they are treated, especially in comparison to how the Japanese treated their POWs.

Emphasis then turns again to materiel. Showing all the destroyed planes, artillery, and ammunition, all needing to be replaced by the American workforce. But at the very end, images of the dead and wounded American soldiers are shown. The narrator assures us they will never be forgotten.

== See also ==
- List of Allied Propaganda Films of World War 2
