= Highballing to Victory =

- Produced by: Army Signal Corps
- Release date: 1944
- Running time: 11 minutes
- Country: United States
- Language: English

Highballing to Victory is a short US propaganda film made toward the end of World War II about the importance of material and transportation in the war effort.

After some stylized, art deco, opening credits, the film begins with a shot of Hitler and scenes from Nazi rallies and early conquests in Europe. "In 1940 Germany set out to dominate Europe" the narrator begins. "He look upon the Eiffel Tower, and beyond it, to the Statue of Liberty." Then the scene switches to scenes in Paris soon after its liberation. "But in 1944 this happened to him." the film then goes on to explain the revolution in military logistics needed to create the Red Ball Express, a system of roadways leading all the way back to Normandy.

In quick succession the film explains how American transportation equipment, especially tires, can be used at that very moment in France, Italy, and in Russia to defeat the third Reich. The narrator reminds us that these materiel begins in America, and even the large amounts of tires and trucks created last year can be "casualties" of war already. The film also emphasizes that it is difficult even to get the materiel to the front, first having to get to port by rail, and then overseas in U-boat inhabited waters. Extensive time is spent on the transportation of materiel to China, and the difficulties getting it to Asia and over the "Hump".

== See also ==
- List of Allied propaganda films of World War II
