= Training Women for War Production =

Training Women For War Production
- Narrated by: Eleanor Roosevelt
- Cinematography: D. Nichols and F.B. Hyde
- Distributed by: National Youth Administration
- Release date: 1942
- Running time: 7 minutes
- Country: United States
- Language: English

Training Women for War Production is a short film.

Eleanor Roosevelt, who was already a big supporter of the National Youth Administration, introduced and narrated this short film for the NYA during the Second World War.

The film opens with Mrs. Roosevelt sitting on a couch - a pink vase is placed in front of her to accentuate the color - and she tells the audience that during the emergency the NYA was changing its gears somewhat, to help the war effort. Whereas the NYA used to provide programs for youth, now it was concentrating on training young girls for war work. Then various scenes are shown explaining women's roles in various capacities, first focusing on traditionally feminine areas such as sewing parachutes and uniforms, nursing, and clerical work. However the latter part of the film increasingly shows the industrial side of war production, particularly the manufacturing of ammunition and weapons.

African-American women's efforts are highlighted in the film. Mrs. Roosevelt, an early champion of Civil Rights, noting that "Negro girls have an important role in war work."

== See also ==
- List of Allied Propaganda Films of World War 2
