= The Army Nurse =

- Produced by: U.S. Army Pictorial Service
- Release date: 1945
- Running time: 16 minutes
- Country: United States
- Language: English

The Army Nurse is a short documentary propaganda film commissioned by the US military to highlight the role and contributions of Army Nurses.

The film opens with a combat scene in the summer of 1945, when the war becomes a million men old (presumably the Battle of Okinawa) one of the soldiers is shown getting wounded and the scene goes woozy. The narrator notes "This is the time for you to decide what you're gonna be: a soldier that gets injured and dies, or a soldier that gets injured and lives." The GI soon realizes that he is no longer on the battlefield but in a hospital, and he is being taken care of by a familiar face, the Army Nurse.

The film then commences a discussion of the Army Nurse's training and life during the war, beginning with basic training. The nurses had to go through the same BT regimen as the soldiers, learning how to scale walls, survive in the wilderness, and set up a hospital in the bush. They are sent to wherever they are needed, whether at home or overseas. It they are overseas, they live in much the same conditions as the soldiers to whom they minister, sleeping in GI cots, in GI tents, and wear the same uniforms and helmets, for which they find various practical uses. They also take the same time out to go to USO shows. The film ends with a short statement from the head of the United States Army Nurse Corps, asking the audience to buy war bonds.

== See also ==
- List of Allied Propaganda Films of World War 2
