= Troop Train =

1943 film

- Directed by: Ralph Steiner
- Produced by: Office of War Information
- Distributed by: Columbia Pictures; War Activities Committee of the Motion Pictures Industry
- Release date: February 11, 1943
- Running time: 11 minutes
- Country: United States
- Language: English

Troop Train is a short American propaganda film produced by the Office of War Information in 1943.

== Background ==
While the film's assumed purpose would be to educate the American public about the role of railroad transportation of military divisions, Troop Train takes a more stylistic approach, with absolutely no narration and little dialogue. The director uses images to tell the story. Footage of rows of war material, troops marching and locomotives are cleverly edited to create a montage propaganda film, something of a rarity in the United States.

The film is also notable for its depiction of service men's life on the long trips across the country to unknown ports, and to unknown fronts in the war.

== See also ==
- Troop sleeper
