= The 957th Day =

1944 American propaganda short film

- Produced by: United States Navy
- Release date: 1944
- Running time: 10 minutes
- Country: United States
- Language: English

The 957th Day was a propaganda short produced by the US Navy in 1944.

The film uses authentic battle footage of the taking of Guam on July 21, 1944, and one narration follows the battle chronologically, while another narration mimics a radio news caster voice. The newscaster related mundane activities like baseball standings, what song is on the top of the charts, and weather, but also news relative to the war effort, like the amount of steel that Pittsburgh has shipped, the monthly Selective Service quota, and the news that one worker got a medal for not missing one day of work since Dec. 8, 1941. This is all superimposed on some very graphic combat footage.

The combat footage is compiled from several days of fighting and actually begins with ships readying for the invasion at Eniwetok (in June). The bombardment of the island lasted for thirteen days and the invasion of Guam was the beginning of a much longer battle. The film leads the viewer to believe that the island was secured on July 21, 1944, when in fact the island was not declared secure until August 10, 1944 after the loss of nearly 19,000 dead between the two sides.

The film runs to ten minutes and is alternatively catalogued as "Navy Training Film No. MN 4380f". It was produced on 35mm black and white film and accompanied with sound.

The film was made in support of the US Sixth War Loan Drive that raised $21.6 billion for the war effort.

== See also ==
- List of Allied propaganda films of World War II
