= Negro Colleges in War Time =

1943 film

- Distributed by: War Activities Committee of the Motion Pictures Industry
- Release date: January 25, 1943
- Running time: 8 minutes
- Country: United States
- Language: English

Negro Colleges in War Time is a short propaganda film produced by the Office of War Information in 1943. Other than in the title no reference is made to the students' race, unusual for the time.

== Synopsis ==
The film begins with a shot of the famous statue of Booker T. Washington at Tuskegee, and notes that "progress and industry" has a new meaning for the present—winning the Second World War. A brief overview of the war related work at several different black colleges follows, starting with Tuskegee where the famous George Washington Carver was putting his brain to work for the war effort. Students are encouraged to join the Tuskegee Airmen or learn about aviation manufacture.

At Prairie View College in Texas and Howard University in Washington, DC students learn the increasingly technical skills of war industry and agriculture. At Howard's medical school, training is also being offered to supply the field with nurses. Hampton University in Virginia is "practically on a 24-hour basis training more war workers" and its radio programs on soybean research and nutrition are featured in the film.
