= The Fleet That Came to Stay =

1945 film by Budd Boetticher

The Fleet That Came to Stay was a propaganda short film produced by the US Navy in 1945 about the naval engagements of the invasion of Okinawa.

The film opens with the small talk of the American GIs soon after they find out where they are headed. One notes that he hears the island looks like San Francisco, while another responds that he once drove from Los Angeles to San Francisco in eight hours, prompting another to boast that he once covered the 360 miles from Buffalo to New York in six. Then it dawns on the servicemen that they will be less than 350 miles from Japan when they get to Okinawa.

The narration begins at that point explaining that the fleet on its way to Okinawa will be the first in history to come into battle with a land-based aerial opponent. Up to this point the Japanese have been at an aerial disadvantage, needing to fly a great distance from Japan to engage the enemy, or be stationed on an aircraft carrier that could be sunk. But now the Americans were coming to their home base. The narrator also talks at length about the kamikaze pilots and the difficulties the Navy has had with them in recent months.

Much of the film is taken up with the kamikaze attacks, and the American pilots trying to shoot them down over the Pacific so they will not crash into Allied warships, which many of them do. There is much footage of the Americans trying to repair the ships while the battle is still going on. Twice during the film, the GIs take time to reflect on news coming from abroad: on April 13, they learn of Franklin D. Roosevelt's death, and on May 9, VE-Day.

== See also ==
- List of Allied propaganda films of World War II
