= 6th Marine Division on Okinawa =

1945 film

The 6th Marine Division on Okinawa is a 1945 Kodachrome color documentary film produced about the action of the 6th Division during the Battle of Okinawa. The film was released shortly after the event.

The film begins by outlining the strategic and psychological importance of Okinawa, including its use as a supply base for Japanese forces in Malaya, the Marianas and the Philippines, as well as a "choke hold" over China. It also informs the audience that Okinawa is an actual part of the Japanese homeland, only a few hundred miles south of Kyushu.

The movements of the units and their order of battle is carefully traced, from the landings on April 1 to the assault on Naha. Some interesting footage is also shown on life in northern Okinawa soon after liberation, with the locals setting up a democratic government under the US military and opening up schools while battle is raging in the south.

Some of the footage includes the use of flame tanks and close air support in an attempt to dislodge heavily dug-in Japanese defenders. The film ends with a eulogy for all those who died attempting to secure the island, as Marines visit a gigantic graveyard prior to departing for their next objective.

== See also ==
- List of Allied propaganda films of World War II
