= Letter from Overseas =

- Title Frame
- Starring: Lorne Greene
- Narrated by: Lorne Greene
- Music by: Lucio Agostini
- Production company: National Film Board of Canada
- Distributed by: National Film Board of Canada; United Artists
- Release date: 1943
- Running time: 15 minutes
- Country: Canada
- Language: English

Letter from Overseas is a 15-minute 1943 Canadian documentary film, made by the National Film Board of Canada (NFB) as part of the wartime The World in Action series. The film describes the training and operational use of Canadian Army soldiers in 1943 during the Second World War.

== Synopsis ==
In 1942, a Canadian soldier stationed in Britain sent an aerogram back home to his mother and father. A terse, and brief account of his recent activities was given. What is not in the letter are the details of the intensive training in which his platoon has been engaged. Once settling into their new barracks, Canadian soldiers have begun a strenuous daily regimen that includes physical exercise, field manoeuvres and becoming proficient with new infantry tactics, weapons and equipment.

The Canadians in England include a detachment of the Canadian Women's Army Corps or WACs who are also playing their part in the overseas mission. The WACs are involved in medical, clerical, and other important work, including bringing in the harvest last fall and volunteering for civilian fire fighting at the height of the Blitz.

The First Canadian Army led by General A.G.L. McNaughton used the training to "toughen up" the troops for a new assignment, an attack on occupied France. After the successful Bruneval Raid in February 1942, the Canadians were again in the forefront of the Dieppe Raid in August 1942. Storming the beaches involved a massive operation that was supported by naval and air forces. After landing and spending nine hours ashore, the surviving troops were evacuated back to England.

While recuperating from the Dieppe Raid, the Canadians sought out entertainment and recreation venues. Playing football English-style and attending dances and music halls were some of the prime after-hours activities.

The intense training re-commenced with emphasis on offensive infantry and armour tactics, played out in the fields and forests of England. There is great anticipation that the future role for Canadian soldiers will take them again into battle against Nazi Germany.

== Cast ==
- General A.G.L. McNaughton as himself (archival footage)

== Production ==
Letter from Overseas was the part of the wartime The World in Action propaganda short film series. The film was produced with financial backing from the Wartime Information Board for the Director of Public Information, Herbert Lash.

Typical of the NFB's series of morale-boosting films, Letter from Overseas used the format of a newsreel, relying heavily on original material shot by the Canadian Army Film Unit in Great Britain, including combat footage of the Dieppe and Bruneval raids. (Note: While describing the Dieppe Raid as mainly successful, the operation is now widely considered a failure.).

The deep baritone voice of stage actor Lorne Greene was featured in the narration of Letter from Overseas, as well as the voice of the soldier who has mailed the aerogram. Greene was known for his work on both radio broadcasts as a news announcer at CBC as well as narrating many of the Canada Carries On series. His sonorous recitation led to his nickname, "The Voice of Canada", and to some observers, the "voice-of-God". When reading grim battle statistics or narrating a particularly serious topic, he was known as "The Voice of Doom".

== Reception ==
In early 1942, NFB head John Grierson through his Hollywood contacts, found a new outlet for NFB documentaries, especially the recently launched war-themed The World in Action series. After the success of selling Warclouds in the Pacific, the NFB was able to make a further arrangement with United Artists for additional titles to be distributed in the United States. With distribution in Canada and Great Britain, he now added the United States market.

Letter from Overseas was produced in 35 mm for the theatrical market, and due to its length, shown as a newsreel. Each film in both The World in Action and Canada Carries On series was shown over a six-month period as part of the shorts or newsreel segments in approximately 800 theatres across Canada. The NFB had an arrangement with Famous Players theatres to ensure that Canadians from coast-to-coast could see them, with further distribution by Columbia Pictures of Canada. After the six-month theatrical tour ended, individual films were made available on 16 mm to schools, libraries, churches and factories, extending the life of these films for another year or two. They were also made available to film libraries operated by university and provincial authorities. A total of 199 films were produced before the series was canceled in 1959.

== See also ==
- Letter from Aldershot (1940)
- Letter from Camp Borden (1941)
