= Women in Defense =

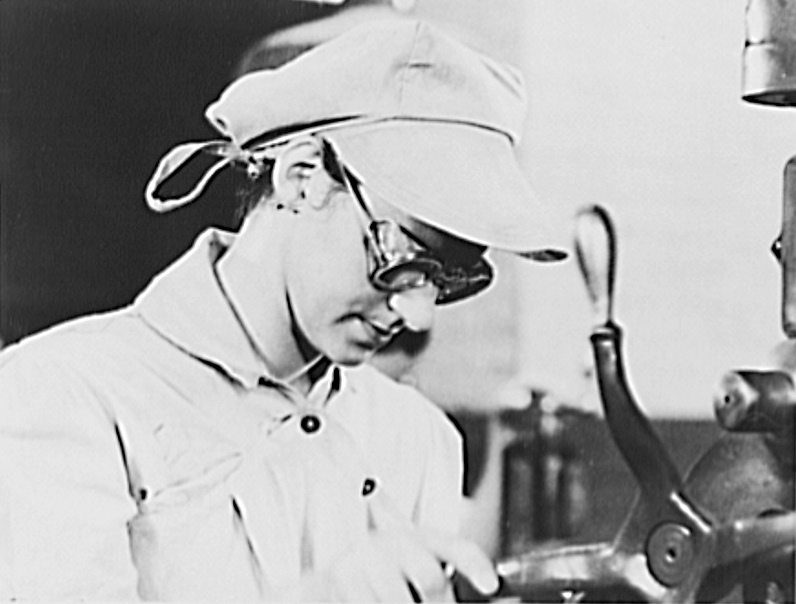
- Film still
- Directed by: John Ford
- Written by: Eleanor Roosevelt
- Produced by: John Ford
- Narrated by: Katharine Hepburn
- Distributed by: War Activities Committee
- Release date: December 24, 1941
- Running time: 18 minutes
- Country: United States
- Language: English

Women in Defense is a 1941 short film produced by the Office of Emergency Management shortly before the United States entered the Second World War. It was directed by John Ford.

The Academy Film Archive preserved Women in Defense in 2008. The film is part of the Academy War Film Collection, one of the largest collections of World War II era short films held outside government archives.

== Synopsis ==
Full short film

Opening with a shot of a statue of "the pioneer woman who helped win a continent", the film briefly outlines the way in which women could help prepare the country for the possibility of war. Among the various way women could help were:

- working in a war materials manufacturing plant
- sewing parachutes for US servicemen
- attending free lectures on how to prepare nutritious meals on presumably rationed food
- Joining the WAC or the Red Cross
- donating blood

There is also a segment on the types of costumes women would wear while engaged in war work. At the end of the film, the narrator explains women are vital to securing a healthy American home life and raising children "which has always been the first line of defense".

== See also ==
- List of Allied Propaganda Films of World War 2
- United States home front during World War II
