= Okinawa Bulletins =

1945 film

The Okinawa Bulletins were a two-part series of films made by the United States Marine Corps documenting the Battle of Okinawa in the summer of 1945.

== Bulletin of the Okinawa Operation MOB-56 ==
The first installment follows the American servicemen from the landings at Okinawa to the beginning of the siege at Naha. The first installment covers the surrender and evacuation of Okinawan civilians, the taking of the hill country, and the capture of some Japanese kamikaze planes and torpedoes. The mass suicides of the Okinawans is never mentioned.

== Okinawa Bulletin #2: Final Phases MOB-64 ==
The second installment covers the siege and capture of Naha, and the final fight against Japanese resistance in the extreme north of the island. It shows some of the Japanese suicides, as well as the few prisoners who were taken after fierce resistance. The film notes that of the 90,000 Japanese soldiers on the island, only 8,000 were taken prisoner. The film ends showing the runways and telling the audience that Okinawa was an important air and sea base for operation against the Japanese homeland.

== See also ==
- List of Allied propaganda films of World War II
