= Dover (film) =

- Starring: Edward R. Murrow
- Production company: Ministry of Information
- Distributed by: Paramount Pictures
- Release date: 26 September 1942
- Running time: 9 minutes
- Country: United Kingdom

Dover is a1942 British short film starring Edward R. Murrow and produced by the British Ministry of Information. It concerns the town of Dover, the most likely "frontline" in any potential German invasion and how it had persevered since 1940.

== Premise ==
The film opens with a look back at the circumstances of mid-1940, how the British had arrived there after Dunkirk, the continuous air raids during the battle of Britain, and the stoicism of the people as they prepared to "die with their boots on" when the invasion came. Now, two years later, Dover is still the front line, but not for defence, for offence. RAF planes control the skies and more Allied sorties are flown over German targets than German raids on Britain. The people have stoically and bravely gone on with their normal lives while contributing to the war effort; most of the men are in the forces, while the women man the anti-aircraft guns. The film ends with the narrator promising that someday soon, barges will leave Britain's shore to liberate Europe.

== See also ==
- List of Allied propaganda films of World War II
