= My Japan =

1945 film

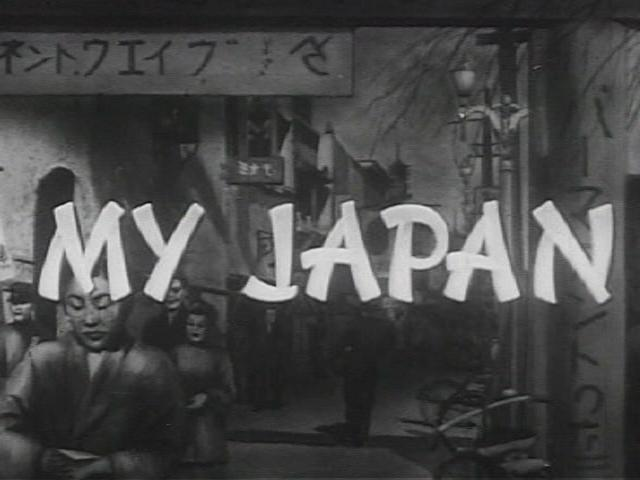
- Title screen
- Release date: 1945
- Running time: 16 minutes
- Country: United States
- Language: English

My Japan, the film.

My Japan is a 1945 American anti-Japanese propaganda short film produced to spur sale of American war bonds. The film takes the form of a mock travelogue of Japan, presented by an impersonated Japanese narrator.

== Background ==
The film was produced by the War Finance Division, a division of the United States Office of War Information, which was responsible for promoting the sale of all securities offered to the public by the Treasury Department. The 1945 United States Government Manual outlines their rights and responsibilities, stating:

"The sales organization (field) consists of offices in all States, the District of Columbia, Hawaii, and Alaska, actively operating in recruiting of volunteer committees, sales, and promotional personnel. The Washington organization formulates publicity and promotion campaigns for recommendation to the State committees and for use at the national level."

My Japan was the only film produced by the War Finance Division in 1945.

== Content ==
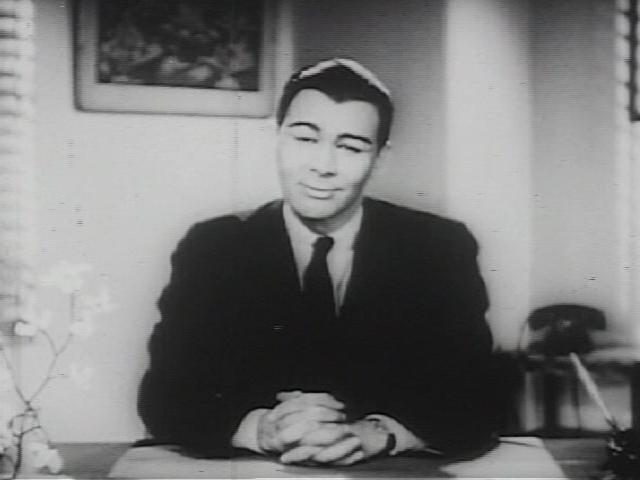
The pseudo-Japanese narrator.

The technique used in My Japan is a form of reverse psychology—to make Americans angry with themselves for their materialistic values, and then turn this anger against the enemy:

"How we suffer when you do not have a full tank of gasoline. How devastated we are at the sight of you jammed into pleasure trains. How we tremble when you have to wait to get into the movies, restaurants and nightclubs. ... You are a nation of bargain-hunters."

"They work longer hours than you do, twice as long, quite often. Why not? They are not working for the clock. They are working to win the war! They do not make as much money as you do. Well, they are not working to make money, they are working to win war! They work every day of every week. Is this so strange? They are not working to get days off, they are working to win the war!"

The film also seeks to anger Americans by belittling their military achievements up to that point:

"Guadalcanal, Tarawa, Saipan, Iwo Jima—you boast of them as major victories. To you, they are. To us, they are minor defeats—the loss of island outposts. You Americans are fond of saying, 'look at the score'. Very well, look at it. You sent your finest troops against these outposts. They died...by the thousands. Here they are, massacred, slaughtered. But you took the islands, you say. Yes, we expected you to. That is why we garrisoned them with second-rate troops. The best of your lives for the worst of ours. We, too, know a thing or two about bargains. You have not yet faced the best of our armies. You have faced only ten percent of our worst!"

=== Statistical comparisons ===
The narrator makes many claims about the numbers and quality of the Japanese army in comparison to America's. These can be compared to actual record to determine their integrity. For example:

Claim	Statistical record
"...what you pay to dig a few thousand of us out of caves on Iwo Jima, only a few thousand."	20,000 est. Japanese casualties at Iwo Jima (Newcomb)
"Guadalcanal, Tarawa, Saipan, Iwo Jima... you sent your finest troops against these outposts, they died by the thousands. Here they are massacred, slaughtered."	Casualties at Guadalcanal; America: 4272; Japan: 28,580 (Clancey); Casualties at Tarawa; America: 3000 est. Japan: 4700 ("Battle of Tarawa"); Casualties at Iwo Jima; America: 28,686; Japan: 20,000 est. (Newcomb)
"We are prepared to spend ten million lives to defeat you."	Japanese population in 1940: approx. 71,933,000; Ages 15–64: approx. 42,080,000; Men ages 15–54: approx. 24,400,000 ("Population"); Total Japanese casualties in World War II: 1,972,000 ("Casualties in World War II")

=== Propaganda comparisons ===
Visuals seen in My Japan can also be witnessed in another source of propaganda from 1945, Know Your Enemy: Japan, directed by Frank Capra. These images, having been claimed to be footage taken by the enemy, are placed in a context which allows for the benefits of buying and holding war bonds to be seen.

These duplicate images include workers of rice fields, school children being taught by "trained government personnel", workers in iron factories, volcanoes, and dead soldiers. Each one of these is placed in different contexts to "prove" two separate points: the effectiveness of the Japanese culture and economy as well as the unknown "threat" that Japan held for Americans. The latter was to be corrected through the purchase of war bonds.

== Censorship and the American response ==
There is little evidence to document the American response to My Japan or how effective it was in convincing Americans to buy war bonds. My Japan was part of a massive effort to promote the Mighty 7th War Loan, and separating those motivated by the film from those motivated by other sources is impossible. Government censorship further clouds the issue because the press was largely incapable of printing anything but positive reviews about war bonds and the war effort in general. (Guide to Federal Records) (Reporting from the Front Lines).

Newspaper articles of the time were distinctly pro-war and contribute to the overwhelming number of sources encouraging Americans to buy war bonds:

"Mayor Kelly will open Chicago Day in the 7th war loan drive at noon today, when he and five members of his cabinet will walk the red, white, and blue Victor trail at State and Madison Streets to buy bonds at the State Street Council's Mighty 7th center."(Chicago Daily Tribune).

Modern responses to My Japan are often associated with concerns regarding censorship, racism, and arms development, but rarely offer insight into first-hand reactions in 1945.

== See also ==
- Propaganda in the United States
- List of Allied Propaganda Films of World War 2
