= Wartime Nutrition =

1943 film

- Release date: 1943
- Running time: 10 minutes
- Country: United States
- Language: English

Wartime Nutrition is a 1943 short film. One of the Allied propaganda films of World War II it urged civilians on the United States home front to eat healthier and follow the wartime ration guidelines.

The film begins with a montage of scenes from American farms and tells the audience that America is now the breadbasket of democracy as well as the arsenal of democracy. It shows how the British have done after years of rationing and their food supply being attacked. It shows the reductions in particular foods and the need to find replacement, particularly in "victory gardens" that can be grown in at home, or even by soldiers. Back in the states many people starve because they don't eat the right kind of food, but the same stuff every day (a sign in the background advertises a sirloin steak, for 35 cents) and a woman orders her usual coffee and donuts for breakfast.

After a short speech by the Surgeon General different methods of improving nutrition and their importance for the war industry worker are examined.
