= Birth of the B-29 =

- Birth of the B-29
- Produced by: Army Pictorial Service
- Release date: 1945
- Running time: 20 minutes
- Country: United States
- Language: English

Birth of the B-29 was a 1945 propaganda film commissioned by the US War Department. As the name implies, it concerned the production of the B-29 Superfortress bomber and its use in the aerial bombing of Japan in World War II.

Opening amid scenes of volcanic eruptions, the narrator gives a brief description of the Japanese and their warlike nature, mentioning such concepts as bushido, Hakko ichiu, and Shinto, and states the belief that everything comes from the sky. The Americans are building a devastating new weapon that will be able to travel vast distances and drop giant payloads of bombs on the Japanese mainland: the B-29.

The manufacturing of Superfortresses in huge factories is then chronicled, as Americans from every walk of life, black, white, male and female, work together to assemble the giant airplanes, each one larger than the Mayflower. The creation of the bomber is the product of all of their work, as well as the work of the miners and lumberjacks who supplied the raw material, the people who bought war bonds, and the servicemen who died so that the workers could have the time to build it.

Soon the Twentieth Air Force is created and the planes are flown to China, where the Americans' allies are happy to build airfields to help defeat the common enemy. The film ends with a B-29 taking off and the narrator saying, "Next stop - Japan!"

== See also ==
- List of Allied propaganda films of World War II
