= The Atom Strikes! =

- Release date: 1945
- Running time: 31 minutes
- Country: United States
- Language: English

The Atom Strikes!

The Atom Strikes! is a documentary commissioned by the U.S. Army Signal Corps Pictorial Division shortly after the end of the Second World War. It documents the findings of a commission sent to Japan to assess the damage caused by the atomic bombing of Hiroshima and Nagasaki.

Opening with the blast of the experimental bombing in Los Alamos, New Mexico in July 1945, the film turns to the Enola Gay and its mission over the Japanese city of Hiroshima. The narrator informs the audience about the military significance of the city and that it had not experienced bombing as yet, but it had been warned. The results of the bombing are then explained, with footage and descriptions of how various buildings were affected by the blast at different distances from ground zero. Afterwards, an interview with Father John A. Siemes, a Jesuit priest who was living at the Novitiate of the Society of Jesus in Nagatsuka, is shown to give the audience a firsthand account of the bombing. Near the end of the interview, the priest is seen reading from a prepared statement.

Nagasaki is then mentioned, with the narrator pointing out how much armament and other military supplies were being produced there, as well as the fact that even civilian homes were used for war work. Nevertheless, the effect of the atomic blast on local schools and churches is also shown.

== See also ==
- List of Allied propaganda films of World War II
