= Remember These Faces =

1945 film

- Release date: 1945
- Country: United States

Remember These Faces is a 1945 short film produced by the United States Navy, Marines, and Coast Guard. It encourages people to contribute to the 7th War Bond drive by following the typical American serviceman from his landing on an unnamed Pacific island, combat, his being wounded in action, and arrival at a military hospital.

The film focuses on the faces of the servicemen as they are about to head into battle, as well as when they are wounded, with the narrator reminding the audience that these were the people they were helping by supporting the war effort.

== See also ==
- List of Allied Propaganda Films of World War 2
- United States home front during World War II
