= Special Delivery (1946 film) =

1946 short propaganda film

- Produced by: U.S. Army Air Forces
- Release date: 1946
- Running time: 12 minutes
- Country: United States
- Language: English

Special Delivery is a short 1946 propaganda film produced by the United States Army Air Forces about Operation Crossroads, when Bikini Atoll was, in 1946, evacuated to be the subject of two (three planned) atomic bomb tests on a large assembled fleet.

== Plot ==
The film begins with shots of American bombers flying in formation and the narrator giving the audience a dictionary definition of a "special delivery" and the vital role that air power played in winning the late conflict. He goes on to say that the Air Force can have constructive, as well as destructive uses—several examples are shown of this, including the dropping of food and supplies to remote areas, using B-17s to get serum to Alaska and B-25s to deploy DDT, and using helicopters to rescue the wounded. These are all examples of the peaceful uses of the air power that had been created for war. Various new aircraft are also shown, such as an early jet, and a "flying wing".

Finally, with much fanfare, the bomb is loaded onto a plane called Dave's Dream and dropped on the test armada. All the personnel whose duties require them to watch the proceedings are given protective goggles to watch "man's most terrible weapon". Following the detonation, firefighting and scientific research efforts are shown, culminating in a summary of the bomb's effects: "x-ray and high speed atomic particles, both deadly types of radioactivity" are discovered and heavy damage is sustained to the target ships.

The film concludes with the message that the air forces responsible for helping to win World War II are now leading the world in peaceful enterprise: in short, that "air power is peace power".

== See also ==
- List of Allied Propaganda Films of World War 2
- List of films in the public domain in the United States
