= Our Enemy — The Japanese =

1943 film

Our Enemy—The Japanese
- Produced by: Office of War Information
- Starring: Joseph C. Grew
- Distributed by: War Activities Committee of the Motion Picture Industry
- Release date: 1943
- Running time: 20 min
- Country: United States
- Language: English

Our Enemy—The Japanese is a 16 mm 1943 short film produced by the US Navy and Office of War Information to provide background knowledge about the wartime foe.

The film begins with the narrator, former U.S. ambassador to Japan, Joseph C. Grew, stating that he has lived in Japan for ten years and that their logic is incomprehensible by Western standards, and that they are 2,000 years behind in ethical, social thinking.

The film is an odd assortment of truths and untruths; for instance, it was true that Japan had been geared to a war path for the last 11 years, that it was a totalitarian society with a tightly controlled press and militaristic education system, and that war production was being carried out in family houses.

However other things are statements of prejudice, or unsubstantiated: it implies several times that the Japanese are not inventive or resourceful, and that they get many of their ideas from the west, "aping American newspapers" or copying Nazi propaganda. It also states that the Shinto religion had always been, and that the Japanese people had always believed, an ideology preaching world domination and fascism; in fact the militarist brand of Shinto was a comparatively recent development.
