= Torpedo Squadron 8 (film) =

1942 short documentary film by John Ford

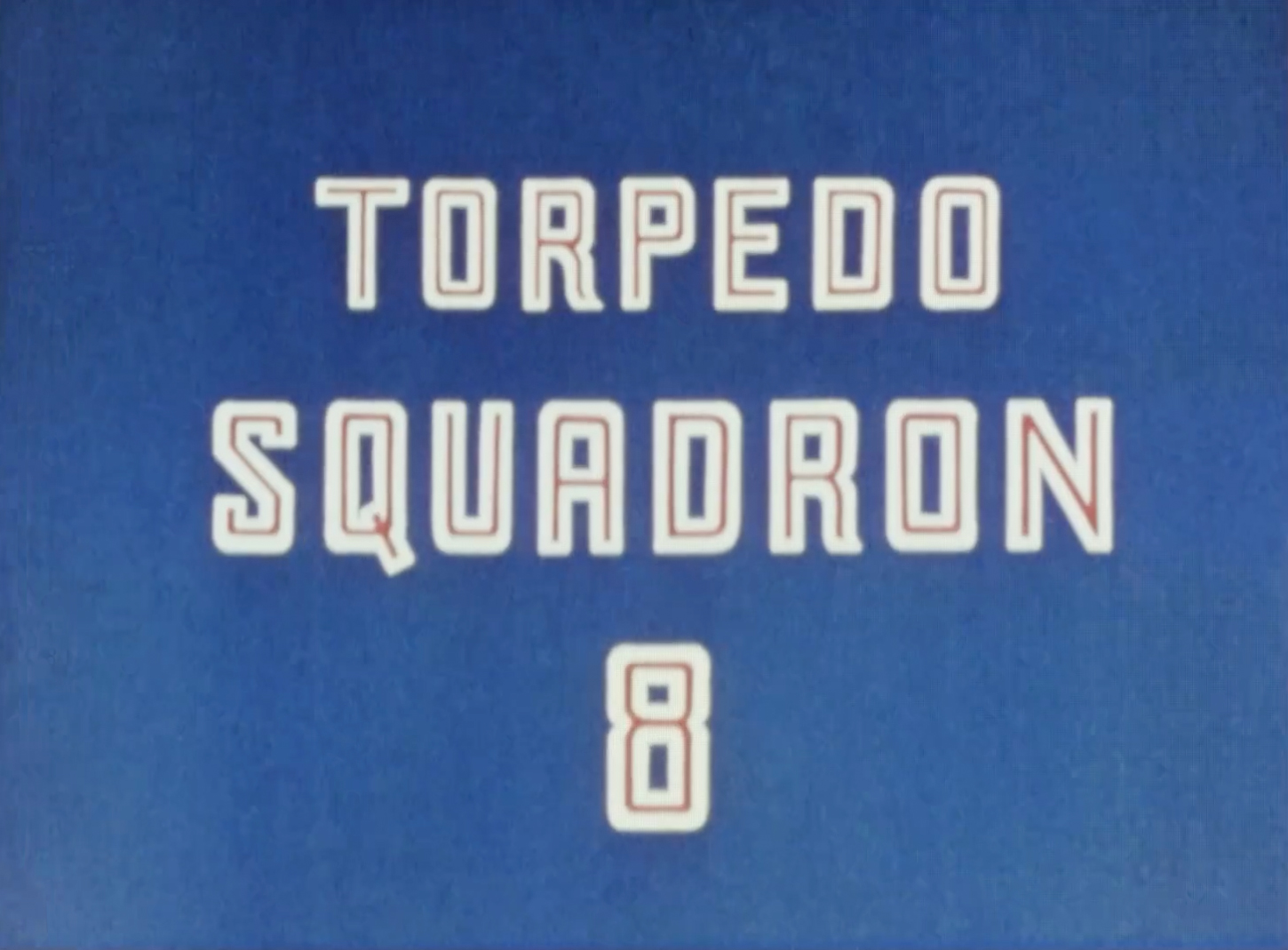
- Intertitle
- Directed by: John Ford
- Produced by: Office of Strategic Services
- Distributed by: United States Navy
- Release date: September 6, 1942
- Running time: 8 minutes
- Country: United States
- Language: English

Torpedo Squadron 8 is a 1942 American short documentary film shot by John Ford while he was on the island of Midway.

== See also ==
Torpedo Squadron 8 (complete film)

- List of Allied propaganda films of World War II
