= The Battle of London =

- Written by: Tom Bret
- Produced by: H.E. Mendelson
- Narrated by: Milton Cross
- Edited by: Jack Kemp
- Music by: Edward Craig
- Production company: Atlas Film Exchange Inc.
- Release date: 1941
- Running time: 15 minutes
- Country: United Kingdom
- Language: English

The Battle of London is a 1941 british short newsreel film produced by H.E. Mendelson for the British War Office and Air Ministry. It was written by Tom Bret and chronicles the impact on the capital city of the winter bombing campaign from 7 September 1940 to 10 May 1941.

== Scenario ==
The first scenes are of a quiet, peaceful London, apparently before the battle, which quickly progress to the first spate of bombings that the city endured and the spirit of resilience in which Londoners pulled together in various ways to keep the city going.

The film ends with the cry "London can take it, and London can give it too!"

== Cast ==
- Milton Cross as narrator
