= John Cromwell =

John Cromwell may refer to:

- John Cromwell (director) (1887–1979), American film director and producer; grandfather of the actor by the same name
- John P. Cromwell (1901–1943), American naval officer
- John Wesley Cromwell (1846–1927), editor, journalist and civil rights activist in Washington, DC
- John Cromwell (actor), American actor, grandson of the director and son of actor James Cromwell
