= It's Your War Too =

- Produced by: US War Department
- Release date: April 20, 1944
- Running time: 10 minutes
- Country: United States
- Language: English

It's Your War Too is a 1944 short documentary film about the American Women's Army Corps and commissioned by the United States Government during World War II. It contains 1 minute of animation by the Walt Disney Studios. This film, and others, were produced to combat some public backlash against women in the military.

== Archive ==
The Academy Film Archive preserved “It's Your War Too” in 2009. The film is part of the Academy War Film Collection, one of the largest collections of World War II era short films held outside government archives.

== Bibliography ==
- Shale, Richard (1982). Donald Duck joins up: the Walt Disney Studio during World War II, Pages 80-3424 Volume 16 of Studies in cinema. Ann Arbor: UMI Research Press. ISBN 978-0-8357-1310-8.
