= Glamour Gal =

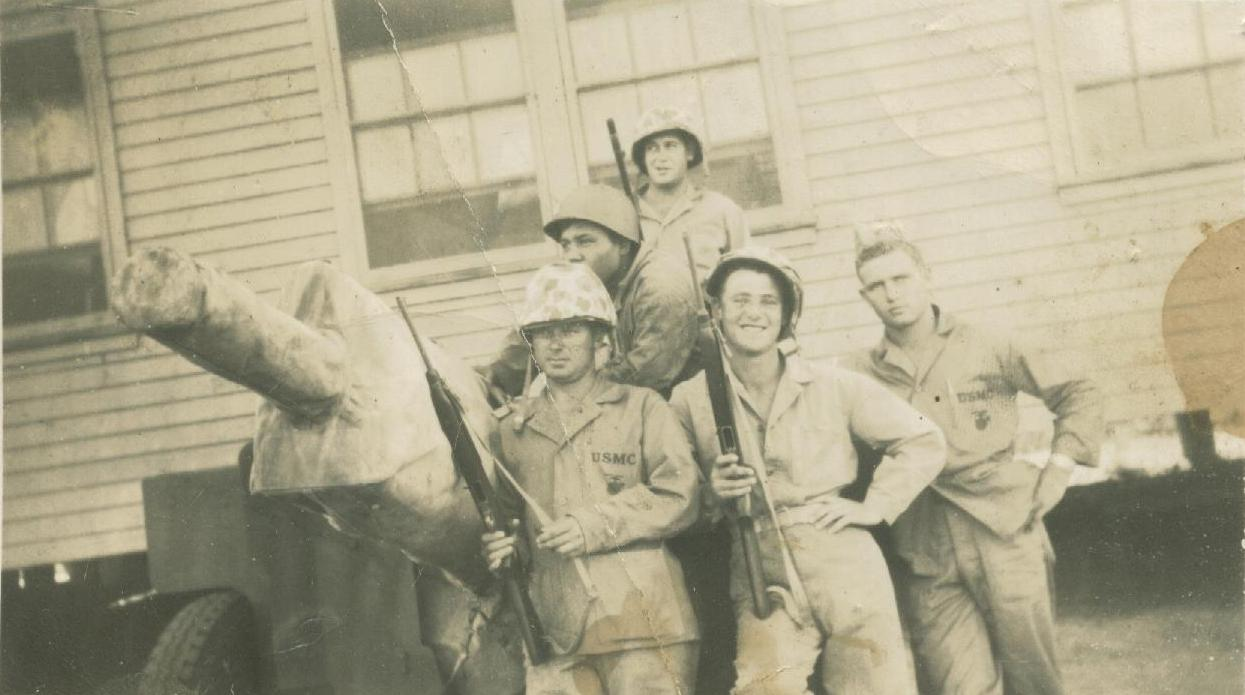
- Glamour Gal and her crew
- Produced by: Marine Corps photographic service
- Cinematography: combat cameramen of the 5th Marine Division
- Distributed by: United States Marine Corps
- Release date: 1945
- Running time: 16 min.
- Country: USA
- Language: English

Glamour Gal is a 1945 propaganda documentary film about the eponymous large artillery gun and the ten Marines who work her, "a team of eleven".

== Overview ==
The film follows Glamour Gal and her escorts from the time she ships off through her service on Iwo Jima. Life for the artillerymen aboard ship is depicted as monotonous, as they are, for the moment, "simply passengers" with little to do except read old magazines and brag about their girlfriends. However, the monotony is broken once the captain announces that they are approaching their destination, Iwo Jima, described as "some rock in between the devil and the Dutch East Indies".

The rest of the film is devoted to authentic color footage of the battle of Iwo Jima. No punches are pulled in its presentation of the event; the narrator notes that Mt. Suribachi saw more flames going into it than it ever gave out as an active volcano, "where no Jap could go on living." However, after 28 days everyone starts talking about where they will be sent to next: "Korea, Formosa, French Indochina". Glamour Gal's next assignment, though, will be in Japan "to keep the peace in Ereater East Asia". The film ends on a somber note, informing the audience of the servicemen who will never leave Iwo Jima.

This was the second film the U.S. military produced about Iwo Jima, the first being To the Shores of Iwo Jima, which featured the famous flag-raising sequence.

== See also ==
- List of Allied propaganda films of World War II
- List of films in the public domain in the United States
