= The Enemy Strikes =

- Produced by: Army Pictorial Services
- Distributed by: United States Department of War
- Release date: March 15, 1945
- Running time: 10 minutes
- Country: United States
- Language: English

The Enemy Strikes! is a short propaganda film made in 1945 about the Battle of the Bulge. Its main emphasis is that, despite recent Allied victories, the Axis could still launch a counter-attack and that this was no time to get complacent.

Opening with shots of the liberation of Paris, the narrator informs the audience that this was America's honeymoon; that at the time people were concerned that the war was about to end and the difficulties of transforming back to civilian life. Particularly noted was the concern that the US had built too many tanks and artillery, and they would be sitting around, useless.

All this changes in December. The Nazis launch a massive counter-offensive in Luxembourg and Belgium, driving the Allied armies back. The Malmedy massacre and the killing of Belgian civilians is given much attention. Finally, the Americans are able to launch an air strike against the Germans and repulse the attack, but the Nazis are still fighting and trying to kill Americans.

The message of complacency is transferred to other theatres, such as the Russian, Pacific and later invasion of Germany, reminding the audience that despite recent victories, the Axis could still strike.
