= Death by Moonlight: Bomber Command =

- Screen shot of title frame
- Written by: Darcy O'Connor; Terence McKenna; Brian McKenna
- Directed by: Brian McKenna
- Starring: Graham Campbell; Gilbert Turp; Nicholas Shields; Janne Mortil; Hamish McEwan
- Narrated by: Terence McKenna
- Music by: Chris Crilly
- Country of origin: Canada
- Original language: English

Production
- Producers: Arnie Gelbart; André Lamy; Adam Symansky; Darce Fardy
- Cinematography: Neville Ottey; Andrew Binnington
- Editor: Susan Shanks
- Running time: 104 minutes
- Production companies: National Film Board of Canada; Canadian Broadcasting Corporation; Galafilm Inc.

Original release
- Network: Canadian Broadcasting Corporation / CBC Television
- Release: 1991

Death by Moonlight: Bomber Command is an episode of the 1992 Canadian The Valour and the Horror television documentary miniseries, and was a co-production between the Canadian Broadcasting Corporation (CBC), the National Film Board of Canada (NFB) and Galafilm Inc. The series investigated three significant Canadian military engagements from the Second World War with Death by Moonlight: Bomber Command dealing with the experiences of Canadian pilots in the RAF Bomber Command.

== Synopsis ==
During the Second World War, between 1942 and 1945, over 50,000 Royal Canadian Air Force (RCAF) personnel served overseas in the RAF Bomber Command with No. 6 Group RCAF. The air crews flew heavy bombers, including the Avro Lancaster and Handley Page Halifax bombers on night raids over enemy territory in Europe. The odds against survival were high, with one in three airmen killed in aerial combat.

Under command of Air Chief Marshal Arthur Harris, the air war changed from one of strategic bombing of military targets such as the dam buster attacks on German dams, to the "area bombing" of German cities. The poor results that had been received in the night bombing campaign was cited as the reason for the shift in tactics. Harris was tasked with implementing Prime Minister Winston Churchill's policy and supported the development of tactics and technology to perform the task more effectively. In order to drop more bombs, the bombers were stripped, taking out heavy armour plates, making them lighter but offering less protection to the air crews.

Canadian airmen were not fully aware of the damage and destruction that was being caused by area bombing with incendiary bombs although the bombing of Hamburg created a firestorm that destroyed the city and caused over 50,000 casualties, many of whom were civilians. The physical and mental strain on surviving air crews was also devastating, with some dismissed as "lacking moral fibre" while others had to live with their guilt, or their wounds. To some, the returning air crew were an embarrassment, while the men and women themselves rarely talked about their war experiences.

== Cast ==
- Graham Campbell as Sir Arthur Harris
- Gilbert Turp as Joseph Martin Favreau
- Nicholas Shields as Jim Moffit (credited as Nick Shields)
- Janne Mortil as Mary Moore ("Bubbles")
- Hamish McEwan as R.C. Dale
- Andrew Gillies as Freeman Dyson
- Mark Burgess as Wing Commander Marvin Fleming
- Patric Creeman as Squadron Leader George Laird
- Duncan Ollerenshaw as Joseph Corbally
- Joel Wyner as Lloyd Smith
- Glen Peloso as John Stainion
- Bill Parrott as William Paul Soeder
- Alex Guard as Pat Chapman
- Jonathan Wilson as James Morrison
- David Kirby as Piano player

== Production ==
The Valour and the Horror series was written by Terence McKenna and his brother, Brian, an award-winning journalist and founding producer of The Fifth Estate who was also the series director. In Death by Moonlight: Bomber Command, of the second program in the series, the feature-length documentary focuses on the Canadian pilots who served in the Bomber Command during the Second World War. Using a docudrama approach, a combination of first-person interviews, re-enactments, stock footage and photographs, was used to depict the war from the perspective of the RCAF airmen and airwomen.

Veterans Doug Harvey and Ken Brown, former RCAF pilots toured the abandoned British airfields such as RAF Tholthorpe where they were stationed in the Second World War. After meeting a number of German civilians who had lived through the Hamburg raid, they were visibly moved by the accounts of the destruction of the city. The veterans also joined a reunion of German night fighter pilots, meeting the very men who tried to kill them.

== Reception ==
Death by Moonlight: Bomber Command first aired on January 19, 1992. Canadian veterans' groups and some prominent historians immediately claimed the episode inaccurately depicted the role of the Bomber Command. Historian Jack Granatstein, in his book, Who Killed Canadian History? also severely criticized The Valour and the Horror. Although accepting that night bombing had initially been ineffective, ultimately leading to a campaign against German cities, the critics noted the more than 600,000 German civilians, mostly old men, women and children were collateral damage, not part of a deliberate campaign.

The Valour and the Horror series became the subject of an inquiry by the Senate of Canada, with the sub-committee that reviewed the veteran's claims, concluding, "... that the criticisms levelled at 'The Valour and the Horror' are, for the most part, legitimate. Simply put, although the filmmakers have a right to their point of view, they have failed to present that point of view with any degree of accuracy or fairness."

In response, the producers claimed that bomber crews, flying at night, were, for the most part, unaware of their true mission because the high-level directives remained top secret throughout the war. Prominent authors Pierre Berton and Margaret Atwood, along with social activist Shirley Douglas, and PEN, the Writer's Union, the Guild, the Producer's Association, and many others defended the series. The subsequent CBC Ombudsman's report dismissed many of the veteran's criticism as they were not adequately supported by documentary evidence.

A group of air force veterans formed the Bomber Harris Trust, suing the CBC and the filmmakers for slander. Their $500 million class action suit was dismissed by Ontario justice Mr. Robert Montgomery, with the Ontario Court of Appeal subsequently ruling that the veterans did not have standing for a class action suit. The Bomber Command veterans appealed to the Supreme Court of Canada, but were dismissed at every level.

Military historians David Bercuson and S. F. Wise later published The Valour and the Horror Revisited, a book examining the historical accuracy of the series. They considered the central themes of Death by Moonlight: Bomber Command are that RAF Bomber Command, "deliberately hid the truth" about RAF bomber crew survival rates, concealed plans about deliberately annihilating civilians, and betrayed the trust of Canadian military airmen.

In 1993, the series was broadcast by Channel Four in Great Britain. The Queen Mother, honorary Colonel of Bomber Command, tried to stop the broadcast, but was unsuccessful. As in Canada, the films stirred a fierce historical debate.

== Honours ==
The films in The Valour and the Horror series received three Gemini Awards in 1993, the highest honour for Canadian film and television. The awards were:

- Best Direction In An Information Or Documentary Program Or Series (Brian McKenna)
- Best Writing In An Information/Documentary Program Or Series (Brian and Terence McKenna)
- Best Documentary Series.

For the first and only time in history, the French versions of the films also received similar honours at the Prix Gemaux with awards for Best Documentary and Best Direction.
