= Letter from Camp Borden =

- Title Frame
- Directed by: Raymond Spottiswoode; Roger Barlow (Associate director)
- Written by: Graham McInnes
- Produced by: Stuart Legg
- Narrated by: Lorne Greene
- Edited by: Alex Myers
- Music by: Lucio Agostini
- Production companies: National Film Board of Canada; Audio Pictures (Toronto)
- Distributed by: Columbia Pictures of Canada
- Release date: 1941
- Running time: 17 minutes
- Country: Canada
- Language: English

Letter from Camp Borden is a 17-minute Canadian documentary film, produced in 1941 and made by the National Film Board of Canada (NFB) as part of the wartime Canada Carries On series. The film was directed by Raymond Spottiswoode and produced by Stuart Legg. Letter from Camp Borden chronicles the experiences in 1941 of a number of soldiers training at the Canadian Army's Camp Borden during wartime.

== Synopsis ==
During the Second World War, new recruits who signed up for the Canadian Active Service Force are sent to Camp Borden. Over 14,000 personnel are accommodated in an immense "city on its own" with barracks, administration centre, warehouses, hangars, classrooms, gasoline stations, department stores, even movie theatres set up at the camp. Constantly expanding, Camp Borden has become the most important wartime training base in Canada, with both army and air force training facilities.

Three young recruits: Joe Cartwright, a graduate from a technical school, garage mechanic F. Stevens and miner Jack Bishop leave civilian life to learn how to become soldiers. Their first introduction to army life is marching and drill with rifles. The next step is learning how to use the rifle in combat. Reading maps, practise with weapons such as the Boys anti-tank rifle, operating armoured vehicles are all part of the 16-week training regimen. (Note: Boys MK.1 anti-tank rifles were produced in Canada by John Inglis and Company and issued to the Canadian Army, but were widely considered to be a "jinx" gun due to its ineffectiveness against Nazi armour at Dunkirk in 1940. In Letter from Camp Borden, a Canadian sergeant is shown trying to explain the "virtues" of the Boys Mk.1 to a group of doubting recruits. The Canadian government, through the Directorate of Military Training, The Department of National Defence and NFB, commissioned a training film, Stop That Tank! (1942), from Walt Disney Studios to counter the rifle's adverse reputation.) By that time, Jack Bishop was promoted to lance corporal and is training a new batch of recruits. The other two "raw" recruits are also taking on more responsibilities, with Private Cartwright becoming proficient as a tank driver, and Private Stevens finishing an advance program on mechanics, before qualifying as a motorcycle courier.

After hours, the recruits enjoyed shows such as the talent show put on by the local Royal Canadian Legion where some of their own performed including Sergeant Ross Hamilton who performed his famous "Marjorie" singing act. (Note: Ross Hamilton was a member of the "Dumbells" comedy/song act of the Canadian Army Third Division Concert Party who performed in the First World War and afterward until 1932.) Other soldiers did imitations of famous figures such as Winston Churchill and Adolf Hitler as well as singing "silly songs" about bedbugs and mosquitoes, to the riotous approval of the audience.

The final stage of training at Camp Borden involved a major joint exercise that pitted 4,000 infantry and units of machine gun, engineering, transport and armour in an attack and defence of a key strongpoint. The realistic war game showed how the training at Camp Borden resulted in the Canadian Active Service Force being ready and able to take their place on the battlefields across the world.

== Cast ==
- Joe Cartwright
- F. Stevens
- Jack Bishop
- Sergeant Ross Hamilton
- Private Dyke
- Private Baxter

== Production ==
Typical of the NFB's Canada Carries On series of morale-boosting propaganda short films, Letter from Camp Borden was made in cooperation with the Director of Public Information, Herbert Lash. Using the format of John Grierson's "creative treatment of actuality", the film relied heavily on the work of the Audio Pictures studio, based in Toronto to chronicle the arrival, training and extracurricular activities of the recruits in Camp Borden. Working with sound editing by Ross Robinson, the Camp Borden material was edited by Alex Myers to provide a coherent story.

The deep baritone voice of stage actor Lorne Greene was featured in the narration of Letter from Camp Borden. Greene was known for his work on both radio broadcasts as a news announcer at CBC as well as narrating many of the Canada Carries On series. His sonorous recitation led to his nickname, "The Voice of Canada", and to some observers, the "voice-of-God". When reading grim battle statistics or narrating a particularly serious topic, he was known as "The Voice of Doom".

== Reception ==
As part of the Canada Carries On series, Letter from Camp Borden was produced in 35 mm for the theatrical market. Each film was shown over a six-month period as part of the shorts or newsreel segments in approximately 800 theatres across Canada. The NFB had an arrangement with Famous Players theatres to ensure that Canadians from coast-to-coast could see them, with further distribution by Columbia Pictures.

After the six-month theatrical tour ended, individual films were made available on 16 mm to schools, libraries, churches and factories, extending the life of these films for another year or two. They were also made available to film libraries operated by university and provincial authorities. A total of 199 films were produced before the series was canceled in 1959.

== See also ==
- Letter from Aldershot (1940)
- Letter from Overseas (1943)
