= Fury in the Pacific =

1945 American documentary short film

- Full film
- Narrated by: Richard Carlson
- Production companies: United States Army; United States Navy; United States Marine Corps
- Distributed by: Warner Bros.
- Release date: March 22, 1945
- Running time: 20 minutes
- Country: United States
- Language: English

Fury in the Pacific is a 1945 American documentary short film about a pair of World War II battles in the Pacific: the Battle of Peleliu and the Battle of Angaur. It was co-produced by the United States Army, United States Navy, and the United States Marines, and directed by a series of combat cameraman — of whom nine became casualties of the battles they were filming. The film is especially noteworthy for its praise of the fighting abilities of Japanese soldiers (a rarity for American propaganda during World War II), and its fast-paced editing.

The film is sometimes erroneously credited to Frank Capra, but he did not, in fact, direct the film.

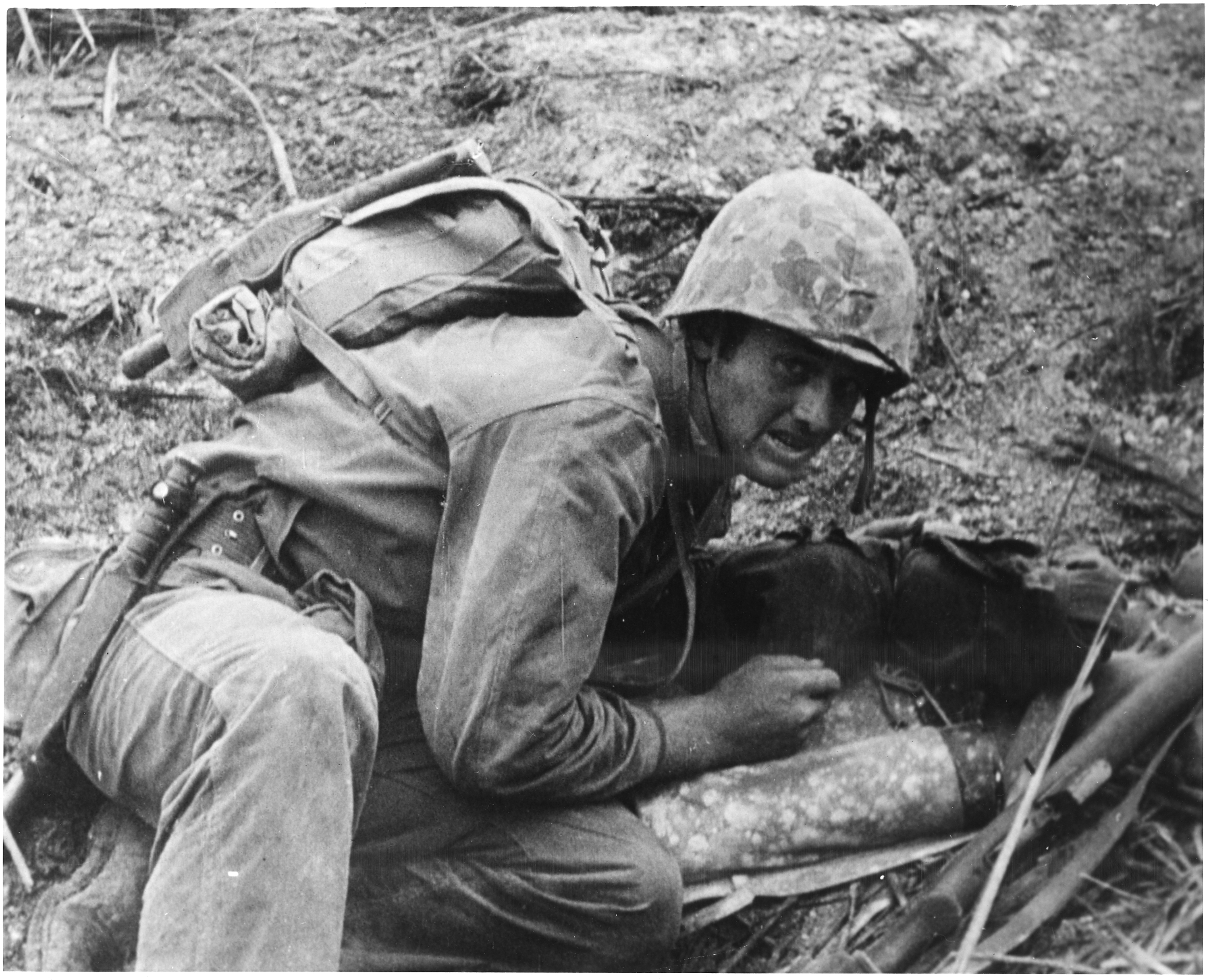

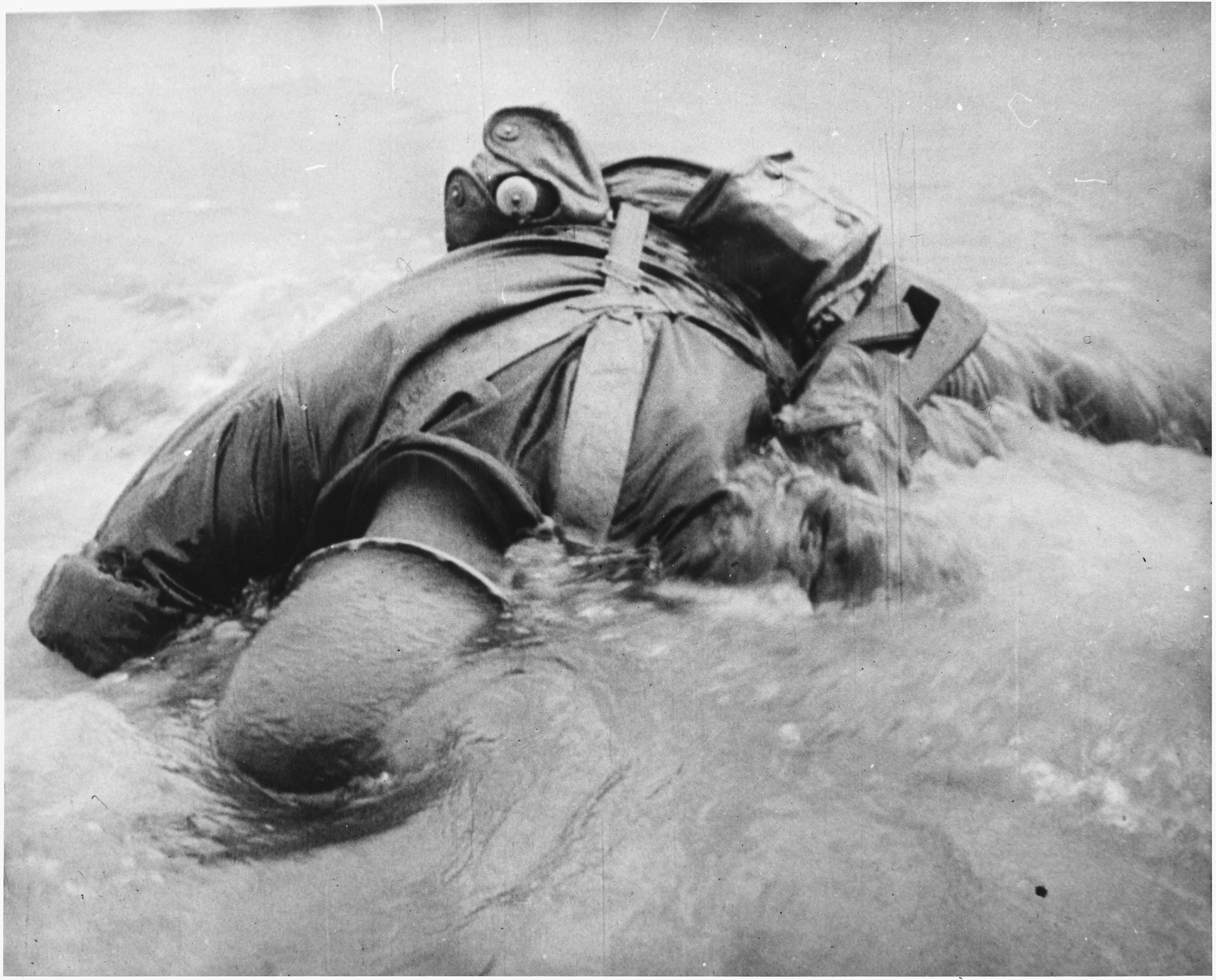

== Cast ==
- Richard Carlson as Narrator
