= Letter from Aldershot =

- Title Frame
- Directed by: John Taylor
- Produced by: Stuart Legg; Frank Badgley (exec.)
- Starring: King George VI; A.G.L. McNaughton; Anthony Eden
- Narrated by: Lorne Greene
- Edited by: Stuart Legg
- Music by: Lucio Agostini
- Production company: National Film Board of Canada
- Distributed by: Columbia Pictures of Canada
- Release date: 1940
- Running time: 9 minutes
- Country: Canada
- Language: English

Letter from Aldershot (Une lettre d'Aldershot) is a nine-minute 1940 Canadian documentary film, made by the National Film Board of Canada (NFB) as part of the wartime Canada Carries On series. The film was directed by John Taylor and produced by Stuart Legg.

Letter from Aldershot describes the observations in 1940 of a soldier from the First Division of the Canadian Active Service Force, stationed at Aldershot Garrison in England.

== Synopsis ==
In December 1939, 16,000 soldiers of the First Division of the Canadian Active Service Force under command of General A.G.L. McNaughton, were deployed to Halifax, Nova Scotia to await embarkation on seven ocean liners. As the convoy of ships set out, the main British battle fleet, on alert because of the German Deutschland battleship lurking in the Atlantic, took over escort duties. As they reached the shores of England, enshrouded in fog, the anxious troops wondered how they would be received.

British officials, including the Secretary of State for Dominion Affairs Anthony Eden, greeted the Canadians while the large throngs of British citizens, who made up the heartfelt and grateful crowd on the docks, shouted "Good old Canada!" After disembarking, the troops and their equipment are transported to Aldershot Garrison, the home of the British Army.

Once settled into their new quarters, the Canadian soldiers begin a strenuous regimen of training that includes becoming proficient with new infantry tactics, weapons and equipment, such as the new Bren light machine gun and the despatch riders' motorbikes. Special drills and exercises stressed the importance of using gas masks and protection against mustard gas attacks.

Their most important leisure time was devoted to corresponding back to their loved ones found in all parts of Canada. Just as cherished was the mail that came from home. With the assistance of a British camera crew, a number of the soldiers were able to make personal "letters home" messages that will end up on cinema screens back in Canada.

After finishing training, the entire contingent was paraded before a royal guest, King George VI. The Canadian troops were then able to seek out the sights and sounds of a London in "full warpaint". Meeting the locals was an exchange of old world and new world cultures, with Canadians bringing their unique skills at hockey to England.

In the tradition of their forebears, the first Canadian troops to reach English shores during the Second World War showed they were ready to "do their part".

== Cast ==
- King George VI as himself (archival footage)
- A.G.L. McNaughton as himself (archival footage)
- Anthony Eden as himself (archival footage)

== Production ==
Typical of the NFB's Canada Carries On series of morale-boosting propaganda short films, Letter from Aldershot was made in cooperation with the Director of Public Information, Herbert Lash. Using the format of a newsreel, the film relied heavily on the work of the Realist Film Unit (RFU), based in London to chronicle the arrival, training and extracurricular activities of the Canadian First Division in England. Working with sound editing by V.H. Lane, C.J. Quick and Walter Darling, the overseas material, along with film shot in Canada, was edited by Stuart Legg to provide a coherent story.

The deep baritone voice of stage actor Lorne Greene was featured in the narration of Letter from Aldershot. Greene, known for his work on both radio broadcasts as a news announcer at CBC as well as narrating many of the Canada Carries On series. His sonorous recitation led to his nickname, "The Voice of Canada", and to some observers, the "voice-of-God". When reading grim battle statistics or narrating a particularly serious topic, he was known as "The Voice of Doom".

== Reception ==
As part of the Canada Carries On series, Letter from Aldershot was produced in 35 mm for the theatrical market. Each film was shown over a six-month period as part of the shorts or newsreel segments in approximately 800 theatres across Canada. The NFB had an arrangement with Famous Players theatres to ensure that Canadians from coast-to-coast could see them, with further distribution by Columbia Pictures.

After the six-month theatrical tour ended, individual films were made available on 16 mm to schools, libraries, churches and factories, extending the life of these films for another year or two. They were also made available to film libraries operated by university and provincial authorities. A total of 199 films were produced before the series was canceled in 1959.

== See also ==
- Letter from Overseas (1943)
- Letter from Camp Borden (1941)
