= Attack in the Pacific =

- Directed by: Frank Capra
- Starring: See below
- Music by: David Raksin
- Release date: 1944
- Running time: 52 minutes
- Country: United States

Attack in the Pacific (also known by the American series title: Armed Forces Information Film: A.F.I.F. Number 3) is a 1944 American war documentary film.

== Cast ==
The full film

- Henry H. Arnold as himself (with Marshall) (archive footage)
- Alan Brooke as himself (at Cairo Conference) (archive footage)
- Chiang Kai-shek as himself (at Cairo Conference) (archive footage)
- Winston Churchill as himself (at Cairo Conference) (archive footage)
- Andrew Cunningham as himself (at Cairo Conference) (archive footage)
- John Dill as himself (at Anglo-American conference) (archive footage)
- James Doolittle as himself (walks deck of Hornet with Mitscher) (archive footage)
- William F. Halsey as himself (on deck) (archive footage)
- Hastings Ismay as himself (at Cairo Conference) (archive footage)
- Ernest J. King as himself (at Cairo Conference, in USMC uniform) (archive footage)
- William D. Leahy as himself (at Cairo Conference) (archive footage)
- Wei Liu as himself (at Cairo Conference) (archive footage)
- George C. Marshall as himself (at Anglo-American conference) (archive footage)
- Marc A. Mitscher as himself (commander, USS Hornet) (archive footage)
- Louis Mountbatten as himself (at Cairo Conference) (archive footage)
- Chester W. Nimitz as himself (decorates soldier) (archive footage)
- Charles Portal as himself (at Cairo Conference) (archive footage)
- Lewis B. Puller as himself (on Peleliu, holds helmet) (archive footage)
- Sam Rayburn as himself (in Congress behind FDR) (archive footage)
- Franklin Delano Roosevelt as himself (Day of Infamy speech) (archive footage)
- James Roosevelt as himself (in Congress beside FDR) (archive footage)
- William H. Rupertus as himself (on Peleliu, beside Puller) (archive footage)
- Chen Shang as himself (at Cairo Conference) (archive footage)
- Raymond A. Spruance as himself (studies map with Nimitz) (archive footage)
- Joseph W. Stilwell as himself (at Cairo Conference) (archive footage)
- Henry Wallace as himself (in Congress behind FDR) (archive footage)
- David Raksin
