= Mission Accomplished (film) =

1943 film

- Produced by: Office of War Information
- Distributed by: War Activities Committee of the Motion Picture Industry
- Release date: April 29, 1943
- Running time: 10 minutes
- Country: United States
- Language: English

Mission Accomplished was a short 1943 propaganda film produced by the United States Office of War Information about the B-17 Flying Fortress.

== Plot ==
The film opens with a brief history of the B-17, its birth in 1935 and its proven war record at Midway and the Philippines. However, the narration states, the B-17 has yet to prove itself over Europe. The time and range needed for a successful bombing raid were not available in the European theatre, some people thought.

The film then switches to a dramatized mission over Europe, with a captain telling his pilots what to bomb and where. The film then follows them on their bombing raid and back. At the end of the film, the many successful raids of the bomber are recounted, as well as the numbers of Germans they have shot down. The B-17 in Europe was a "mission accomplished".
