= War Activities Committee of the Motion Pictures Industry =

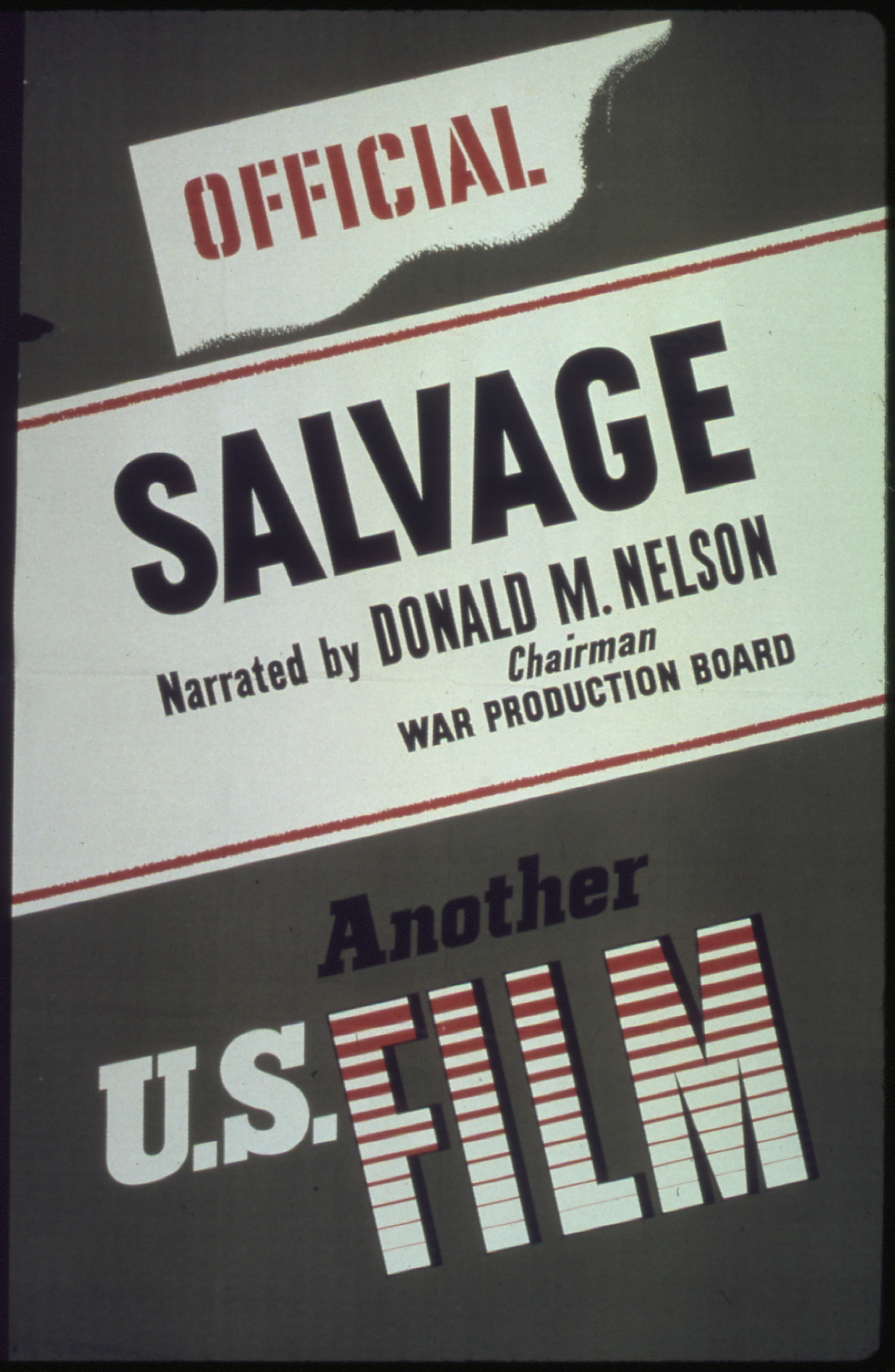
Poster for the short film Salvage (1942), produced by the War Activities Committee of the Motion Pictures Industry and the War Production Board

The War Activities Committee of the Motion Pictures Industry was a group that was formed by the U.S. motion picture industry to assist the US government during World War II. It distributed many government-produced propaganda films and organized war bond drives. Robert B. Wilby, of Wilby-Kinsey Corporation in Atlanta, Georgia, was chairman of the Exhibition Division of the War Activities Committee. He spent time in Europe on tour of the theater of operations, meeting with notable officers such as Lt. Col. G. A. I Druy, M.C., Chief Commander of the Greenadier Buards depot at Caterham, England. The committee produced many films at the beginning of WWII recruiting women to work.
