= Universe (1960 film) =

- Directed by: Roman Kroitor; Colin Low
- Written by: Roman Kroitor; Stanley Jackson
- Produced by: Tom Daly
- Starring: Donald MacRae
- Narrated by: Douglas Rain; Gilles Pelletier (French)
- Cinematography: Wolf Koenig; Denis Gilson
- Edited by: Tom Daly; Kathleen Shannon (sound)
- Music by: Eldon Rathburn
- Production company: National Film Board of Canada
- Distributed by: National Film Board of Canada
- Release date: May 1960
- Running time: 29 minutes
- Country: Canada
- Language: English
- Budget: $105,146

Universe (Notre univers) is a 1960 black-and-white documentary short film made in 1960 by Roman Kroitor and Colin Low for the National Film Board of Canada (NFB). The NFB writes: "[The film] creates on the screen a vast, awe-inspiring picture of the universe as it would appear to a voyager through space. Realistic animation takes you into far regions of space, beyond the reach of the strongest telescope, past Moon, Sun, and Milky Way into galaxies yet unfathomed."

This visualization is grounded in the nightly work of Dr. Donald MacRae, an astronomer at the David Dunlap Observatory in Richmond Hill, Ontario. Using the technology of his era, MacRae prepares his largely manually operated equipment and then photographs, by long exposure, one star. He actually strikes an arc between iron electrodes and makes a simultaneous exposure, which he can compare to the star's spectrum to determine its movement relative to Earth.

== Production ==
Roman Kroitor and Colin Low considered making a film about the universe five years before the launch of Sputnik 1. A budget of $60,000 was requested. Don Mulholland, the Director of Production, wanted the film divided into three parts in order to justify its cost. NFB Commissioner Albert Trueman gave the film $20,000 per year, and they put the film on hold once they used up the money for that year. The film was not completed after three years so more money was given with the requirement that it be completed within the next year. The film was completed on 31 March 1960; its budget was $105,146.

== Release ==
300 prints of the film were ordered by NASA and the NFB sold over 3,100 copies by 1976. It was one of the more widely distributed educational films ever made.

== Awards ==
Event	Date	Award	Recipient	Result	Ref.
Cannes Film Festival	May 4–20, 1960	Jury Prize for Exceptional Animation Quality	Universe	Won	
Cannes Film Festival	May 4–20, 1960	Technical Mention of the Commission Supérieure Technique du Cinéma Français	Universe	Won	
Vancouver International Film Festival	July 11–23, 1960	First Prize – Documentary	Universe	Won	
Vancouver International Film Festival	July 11–23, 1960	Diploma, Scientific Films	Universe	Won	
Yorkton Film Festival	Oct. 17-19 1960	Golden Sheaf Award - Best of Festival	Universe	Won	
Stratford Film Festival, Stratford, Ontario	Aug. 22-Sept. 3 1960	Special Commendation	Universe	Won	
Cork International Film Festival, Cork	Sept. 21-Oct. 6 1960	First Prize – Diploma of Merit	Universe	Won	
Edinburgh International Film Festival	Aug. 21-Sept. 10 1960	Diploma of Merit, Science	Universe	Won	
14th British Academy Film Awards	April 6, 1961	BAFTA Award for Best Animated Film	Universe	Won	
13th Canadian Film Awards, Toronto	May 13, 1961	Film of the Year	Universe	Won	
13th Canadian Film Awards, Toronto	May 13, 1961	Best Theatrical Short	Universe	Won	
Salerno Film Festival	Oct. 1 1961	First Prize - Documentary	Universe	Won	
Columbus International Film & Animation Festival, Columbus, Ohio	Sept. 13-15 1961	Chris Award, First Prize, Information/Education	Universe	Won	
Rapallo International Film Festival	Jan. 4-8 1961	Cup of the Minister of Tourism and Entertainment	Universe	Won	
Scholastic Teacher Magazine Annual Film Awards, New York	March 1, 1961	Award of Merit	Universe	Won	
Philadelphia International Festival of Short Films	Nov. 13-18 1961	Award for Exceptional Merit	Universe	Won	
33rd Academy Awards	Oct. 17 1961	Best Documentary Short Subject	Universe	Nominated	
International Festival of Educational Films, Mar del Plata	Feb. 18 1962	Grand Prize	Universe	Won	
International Festival of Educational Films, Mar del Plata	Feb. 18 1962	First Prize - Documentary	Universe	Won	
International Festival of Educational Films, Mar del Plata	Feb. 18 1962	Best Music	Eldon Rathburn	Won	
Roshd International Film Festival, Tehran	June 29-July 9, 1964	First Prize - Golden Delfan, Scientific Films	Universe	Won	

== Legacy ==
After Universe was released, Colin Low worked with Stanley Kubrick on 2001: A Space Odyssey. Kubrick chose narrator Douglas Rain as the voice of the HAL 9000 computer and hired cinematographer Wally Gentleman, who did optical effects for Universe, to work on 2001.

According to Kubrick biographer Vincent Lobrutto:

As the film unspooled, Kubrick watched the screen with rapt attention while a panorama of the galaxies swirled by, achieving the standard of dynamic visionary realism that he was looking for. These images were not flawed by the shoddy matte work, obvious animation and poor miniatures typically found in science fiction films. Universe proved that the camera could be a telescope to the heavens. As the credits rolled, Kubrick studied the names of the magicians who created the images: Colin Low, Sidney Goldsmith, and Wally Gentleman.

== Works cited ==
- Evans, Gary (1991). In the National Interest: A Chronicle of the National Film Board of Canada from 1949 to 1989. University of Toronto Press. ISBN 0802027849.
- Jones, David (1981). Movies and Memoranda: An Interpretative History of the National Film Board of Canada. Canadian Film Institute. ISBN 0919096212.
