= Colin Low (filmmaker) =

Canadian filmmaker (1926–2016)

- Born: Colin Archibald Low; July 24, 1926; Cardston, Alberta, Canada
- Died: February 24, 2016 (aged 89); Montreal, Quebec, Canada
- Occupations: Director, Producer, Animator, editor
- Years active: 1946-2000
- Awards: Order of Canada; Royal Canadian Academy of Arts; Prix Albert-Tessier and below

Colin Archibald Low CM RCA (July 24, 1926 – February 24, 2016) was a Canadian animation and documentary filmmaker with the National Film Board of Canada (NFB). He was known as a pioneer, one of Canada's most important filmmakers, and was regularly referred to as "the gentleman genius". His numerous honors include five BAFTA awards, eight Cannes Film Festival awards, and six Academy Award nominations.

== Early life ==
Low was born and raised in Cardston, Alberta, to Gerald and Marion Low, ranchers who were members of The Church of Jesus Christ of Latter-day Saints. The town borders the Kainai Nation (Blood Tribe), which later became the subject of two of his films; his 1960 film Circle of the Sun marked the first time the Kainai Nation's sacred Sun Dance was filmed.

== Career ==
Low studied graphic design and animation at the Banff School of Fine Arts and then the Calgary Institute of Technology. In 1946, while he was at the latter, the National Film Board of Canada was hiring and put out a call for student submissions; one of Low's teachers suggested that he send in his portfolio and, a week later, he was hired by the prominent NFB filmmaker Norman McLaren. McLaren placed Low under the tutelage of George Dunning, who would act as his mentor for five years. To hone his animation skills, he was also put to work with NFB animator Evelyn Lambart.

Low was recognized as a filmmaker in 1949. In 1950, he was appointed Head of the Animation Unit. From 1972 to 1976, he was an executive producer for the NFB's Studio C; in 1976, he became Director of Regional Production. He would stay with the NFB for the rest of his life, making 203 films and acting as a researcher and advisor on many others. He officially retired in 1997, but continued to write about animation and large-format film, and to work on film projects.

== Influence on Stanley Kubrick and Ken Burns ==
Low's 1957 documentary City of Gold made use of slow pans and zooms across archival photos and has been cited by Ken Burns as a key inspiration for the so-called 'Ken Burns effect'.

In 1960, Low and Roman Kroitor co-directed Universe, capturing the attention of Stanley Kubrick, who was preparing to make 2001: A Space Odyssey. Low was invited to work on 2001: A Space Odyssey but had to decline because he was making In the Labyrinth, a multi-screen production for Expo 67. Some of his ideas and techniques were incorporated into Kubrick's film and Kubrick used the narrator from Universe (Douglas Rain) as the voice of his HAL 9000 computer.

== Challenge for Change ==
From 1966 to 1968, Low worked with the people of Fogo Island, Newfoundland to shoot 27 films for the NFB's Challenge for Change program, using media as a tool to bring about social change and combat poverty.

== IMAX ==
Low was involved in a series of firsts in the wide-screen genre. The experimental multi-screen production In the Labyrinth helped lead to the creation of the IMAX format. Low co-directed the first IMAX 3D production Transitions for Expo 86 in Vancouver, and co-directed Momentum, the first film in 48 frames per-second IMAX HD for Expo 92 in Seville, Spain.

== Lifetime achievement recognition ==
In 1972, at the 24th Canadian Film Awards, Low received the inaugural Grierson Award for "an outstanding contribution to Canadian cinema."

Low was a member of the Royal Canadian Academy of Arts and, in 1996, in recognition of his extraordinary contributions to cinema in Canada and around the world, was invested as a Member of the Order of Canada.

In 1997, Low was awarded the Prix Albert-Tessier, given to individuals for an outstanding career in Québec cinema.

In 2002, the Large Format Cinema Association presented Low and the NFB with its Abel Gance Award for outstanding work in large format filmmaking.

In 2013, the DOXA Documentary Film Festival created the annual Colin Low Award, sponsored by the Director's Guild of Canada, and presented to director of the best Canadian documentary film in the festival program.

== Personal life and death ==
Shortly after joining the NFB, Low met Eugénie (Jean) St. Germain in Montreal. They married in 1947 and had three sons. He was survived by his wife and sons when he died in Montreal on February 24, 2016.

== Filmography ==
All for the National Film Board of Canada

- Cadet Rousselle - animated short, George Dunning 1946 - co-animator with George Dunning
- Christmas Carols - animated short, Jim MacKay 1947 - co-animator with Grant Munro, Helen MacKay, Robert Verrall, George Dunning and Lyle Enright
- Time and Terrain - documentary short 1948 - director, animator, co-editor with Robert Verrall
- Teamwork - Past and Present - animated short, Michael Spencer 1950 - editor, animator
- Challenge: Science Against Cancer - documentary short, Morten Parker 1950 - co-animator with Evelyn Lambart
- The Fight: Science Against Cancer - documentary short, Morten Parker 1950 - co-animator with Evelyn Lambart
- The Outlaw Within - documentary short, Morten Parker 1951 - co-animator with Evelyn Lambart
- Age of the Beaver - documentary short 1952 - director
- The Romance of Transportation in Canada, Part 1 - animated short 1952 - director
- The Romance of Transportation in Canada, Part 2 - animated short 1953 - director
- A Thousand Million Years - documentary short 1954 - director
- One Little Indian - puppet film, Grant Munro 1954 - co-producer with Tom Daly
- Corral - documentary short 1954 - writer, director
- Riches of the Earth - documentary short 1954 - director
- Gold - documentary short 1955 - director
- The Jolifou Inn - documentary short 1955 - editor, director
- It's a Crime - animated short Wolf Koenig 1957 - production designer
- City of Gold - documentary short 1957 - with Wolf Koenig, co- cinematographer and co-director
- The Living Stone - documentary short, John Feeney 1958 - co-cinematographer with Patrick Carey and Wally Gentleman
- City Out of Time - documentary short 1959 - director
- A is for Architecture - documentary short, Gerald Budner and Robert Verrall 1960 - co-producer with Tom Daly
- Hors-d'oeuvre - animated short, Gerald Potterton, Robert Verrall, Arthur Lipsett, Derek Lamb, Jeff Hale and Kaj Pindal 1960 - co-producer with Victor Jobin
- Universe - documentary short 1960 - co-director with Roman Kroitor
- Circle of the Sun - documentary short 1960 - writer, director
- The Days of Whiskey Gap - documentary short 1961 - director
- Very Nice, Very Nice - documentary short, Arthur Lipsett 1961 - co-producer with Tom Daly
- Do You Know the Milky Way? - documentary short 1961 - director
- My Financial Career - cartoon, Gerald Potterton 1962 - co-producer with Tom Daly
- The Peep Show - cartoon, Kaj Pindal 1962 - producer
- The World of David Milne - documentary short, Gerald Budner 1962 - co-producer with Tom Daly
- Pot-pourri - montage, Jeff Hale, Derek Lamb, Austin Campbell, Kaj Pindal, Grant Munro, Cameron Guess, Rhoda Leyer 1962 - co-producer with Victor Jobin
- 21-87 - documentary short, Arthur Lipsett 1963 - co-producer with Tom Daly
- The Ride - short film, Gerald Potterton 1963 - producer
- I Know an Old Lady Who Swallowed a Fly - animated short, Derek Lamb 1963 - producer
- The Hutterites - documentary short 1964 - director
- Free Fall - experimental short, Arthur Lipsett 1964 - co-producer with Tom Daly
- An Essay on Science - documentary short, Guy L. Coté 1964 - co-animator with Pierre L'Amare
- Riches of the Earth, Revised - documentary short 1966 - director
- McGraths At Home and Fishing - documentary short 1967 - director
- The Mercer Family - documentary short 1967 - director
- The Merchant and the Teacher - documentary short 1967 - director
- The Songs of Chris Cobb - documentary short 1967 - director
- Tom Best on Co-Operatives - documentary short 1967 - director
- A Wedding and a Party - documentary short 1967 - director
- Citizen Discussions - documentary short 1967 - director
- Dan Roberts on Fishing - documentary short 1967 - director
- Discussion on Welfare - documentary short 1967 - director
- Fishermen's Meeting - documentary short 1967 - director
- Some Problems of Fogo - documentary short 1967 - director
- The Story of the Up Top - documentary short 1967 - director
- Two Cabinet Ministers - documentary short 1967 - director
- The Fogo Island Improvement Committee - documentary short 1967 - director
- Fogo's Expatriates - documentary short 1967 - director
- The Founding of the Co-operatives - documentary short 1967 - director
- Jim Decker Builds a Longliner - documentary short 1967 - director
- Jim Decker's Party - documentary short 1967 - director
- Joe Kinsella on Education - documentary short 1967 - director
- Thoughts on Fogo and Norway - documentary short 1967 - director
- Andrew Britt at Shoal Bay - documentary short 1967 - director
- Billy Crane Moves Away - documentary short 1967 - director
- Brian Earle on Merchants and Welfare - documentary short 1967 - director
- The Children of Fogo Island - documentary short 1967 - director
- William Wells Talks About the Island - documentary short 1967 - director
- A Woman's Place - documentary short 1967 - director
- In the Labyrinth - documentary short 1967 - co-director with Roman Kroitor and Hugh O'Connor
- Introduction to Fogo Island - documentary short 1968 - director
- The Winds of Fogo - documentary short 1969 - director
- Of Many People - documentary short, Stanley Jackson 1970 - co-editor with Malca Gillson and John Spotton
- Cell 16 - documentary short, Martin Duckworth 1971 - producer
- The Sea - documentary short, Bané Jovanovic 1971 - co-producer with Tom Daly and William Brind
- Time Piece - documentary short, Albert Kish 1971 - producer
- God Help the Man Who Would Part with His Land - documentary, George C. Stoney 1971 - co-producer with Tom Daly
- I Don't Think It's Meant For Us... - documentary short, Kathleen Shannon 1971 - co-producer with George C. Stoney
- Here is Canada - documentary short, Tony Ianzelo 1972 - producer
- The Question of TV Violence - documentary, Graeme Ferguson 1972 - producer
- That Gang of Hoodlums? - documentary short, Robert Nichol 1972 - co-executive producer with Len Chatwin
- A Memo from Fogo - documentary, Roger Hart 1972 - producer
- When I Go...That's It! - documentary short 1972 - co-producer and co-director with George C. Stoney, Ron Alexander and Dennis Sawyer
- Child, Part 1: Jamie, Ethan and Marlon: The First Two Months - documentary short, Robert Humble 1973 - executive producer
- Child, Part 2: Jamie, Ethan and Keir: 2-14 Months - documentary short, Robert Humble 1973 - executive producer
- Child, Part 3: Debbie and Robert: 12-24 Months - documentary short, Robert Humble 1973 - executive producer
- The Greenlanders - documentary short, Hubert Schuurman 1973 - co-executive producer with Len Chatwin
- Rock-A-Bye - documentary short, Jacques Bensimon 1973 - executive producer
- Kainai - documentary short, Raoul Fox 1973 - producer
- Do Your Thing - documentary short, Len Chatwin 1973 - production team
- The Man Who Can't Stop - documentary, Michael Rubbo 1973 - executive producer
- Coming Home - documentary, Bill Reid 1973 - co-producer with Tom Daly
- Sub-Igloo - documentary short, James de Beaujeu Domville and Joseph B. MacInnis 1973 - executive producer
- Freshwater World - documentary short, Giles Walker 1974 - executive producer
- King of the Hill - documentary, William Canning and Donald Brittain 1974 - executive producer
- Another Side of the Forest - documentary short, Raoul Fox and Strowan Robertson 1974 - executive producer
- Running Time - feature, Mort Ransen 1974 - executive producer
- Sananguagat: Inuit Masterworks - documentary short, Derek May 1974 - executive producer
- Thoughts on the Future with George McRobie - documentary short, Roger Hart 1974 - executive producer
- The Boat That Ian Built - documentary short, Andy Thomson 1974 - co-producer with Stanley Jackson
- Cree Hunters of Mistassini - documentary, Boyce Richardson and Tony Ianzelo 1974 - producer
- In Praise of Hands - documentary short, Donald Winkler 1974 - co-producer with Tom Daly
- In Search of the Bowhead Whale - documentary, Bill Mason 1974 - executive producer
- The New Alchemists - documentary short, Dorothy Todd Hénaut 1974 - producer
- Our Land is Our Life - documentary, Boyce Richardson and Tony Ianzelo 1974 - producer
- Sisters of the Space Age - documentary short, James Carney 1974 - executive producer
- Bate's Car: Sweet as a Nut - documentary short, Tony Ianzelo 1974 - executive producer
- Waiting for Fidel - documentary, Michael Rubbo 1974 - executive producer
- Bill Loosley's Heat Pump - documentary short, Kenneth McCready 1975 - executive producer
- I Am an Old Tree - documentary, Michael Rubbo 1975 - executive producer
- In All Seasons - documentary short, Ernest Reid 1975 - executive producer
- Jack Rabbit - documentary short, William Brind 1975 - executive producer
- The Lady and the Owl - documentary short, William Canning 1975 - executive producer
- Metal Workers - documentary short, Robert Fortier and Donald Winkler 1975 - co-producer with Rick Raxlen and Tom Daly
- Musicanada - documentary, Malca Gillson and Tony Ianzelo 1975 - executive producer
- A New Bargain - documentary short, Roger Hart 1975 - executive producer
- Vietnam Recall - documentary, Desmond Dew 1975 - executive producer
- New Romance (Aspects of Sexuality and Sexual Roles) - documentary short, Janet Walczewski and Susan Gabori 1975 - executive producer
- Operation G.A.T.E. - documentary short, Don Virgo 1975 - executive producer
- Descent - documentary short, Giles Walker and Paul Cowan 1975 - executive producer
- Earthware - documentary short, Rick Raxlen and Donald Winkler 1975 - co-producer with Rick Raxlen and Tom Daly
- First Born - documentary short, Joan Henson 1975 - executive producer
- The Forest Watchers - documentary short, Peter Raymont 1975 - executive producer
- Hinchinbrook Diary - documentary short, Rick Raxlen 1975 - executive producer
- Niagara for Sale - documentary, William Canning 1975 - executive producer
- No Way They Want to Slow Down - documentary short, Giles Walker 1975 - executive producer
- Operation High Test - training film, Douglas Cameron 1975 - executive producer
- Alberta Girls - documentary short, Malca Gillson and Tony Ianzelo 1975 - executive producer
- Arctic IV - documentary, James de Beaujeu Domville 1975 - producer
- Lumsden - documentary short, Peter Raymont 1975 - executive producer
- The Mad Canadian - documentary short, Robert Fortier 1976 - executive producer
- The Other World - documentary short, Claudia Overing 1976 - executive producer
- The Land: A New Priority - documentary short, Roger Hart 1976 - executive producer
- Blackwood - documentary short, Tony Ianzelo and Andy Thomson 1976 - executive producer
- A Sense of Place - documentary, René Bonnière 1976 - executive producer
- The Sword of the Lord - documentary, Giles Walker 1976 - executive producer
- Threads - documentary short, Donald Winkler and Anne Henderson 1976 - co-producer with Diane Beaudry and Tom Daly
- Waterloo Farmers - documentary short, Italo Costa 1976 - executive producer
- Wax and Wool - documentary short, Donald Winkler and Rick Raxlen 1976 - co-producer with Rick Raxlen and Tom Daly
- The Whales are Waiting - documentary short, Tony Ianzelo, Andy Thomson and Strowan Robertson 1976 - executive producer
- The Canadian Air Connection - training film, Douglas Cameron 1976 - executive producer
- Christ is Risen - documentary short, William Canning 1976 - executive producer
- Potatoes - documentary short, Robert Lang 1976 - executive producer
- A Sense of Hummus - documentary short, Christopher Chapman 1976 - executive producer
- We Can't Stand Still Can We? - documentary short, Kenneth McCready 1976 - executive producer
- Coaches - documentary, Paul Cowan 1976 - executive producer
- First Steps - documentary short, Philip Bridgeman and Alec MacLeod 1976 - executive producer
- The Great Clean-Up - documentary, James Carney 1976 - executive producer
- A Great White Bird - documentary, Michael McKennirey 1976 - executive producer
- Log House - documentary short, Michael Rubbo and Andreas Poulsson 1976 - executive producer
- Los Canadienses - documentary, Albert Kish 1976 - co-producer with Tom Daly
- Have I Ever Lied to You Before? - documentary, John Spotton 1976 - executive producer
- High Grass Circus - documentary, Torben Schioler and Tony Ianzelo 1976 - executive producer
- Little Big Top - documentary short, Torben Schioler and Tony Ianzelo 1977 - co-executive producer with Michael McKennirey
- Path of the Paddle: Solo Basic - documentary short, Bill Mason 1977 - executive producer
- Path of the Paddle: Doubles Basic - documentary short, Bill Mason 1977 - executive producer
- Path of the Paddle: Solo Whitewater - documentary short, Bill Mason 1977 - executive producer
- Path of the Paddle: Doubles Whitewater - documentary short, Bill Mason 1977 - executive producer
- Child, Part 4: Kathy and Ian: Three-Year-Olds - documentary short, Robert Humble 1977 - executive producer
- River (Planet Earth) - documentary short, Peter Raymont 1977 - executive producer
- You're Eating For Two - documentary short, Malca Gillson 1977 - executive producer
- Forest Under Siege - documentary short, Desmond Dew 1977 - executive producer
- The Biosphere - documentary, William Pettigrew 1979 - co-producer with Barrie Howells
- A Pinto for the Prince - documentary short 1979 - co-director with John Spotton
- Atmos - documentary short 1980 - director
- Standing Alone - documentary 1982 - director
- The Contour Connection - documentary short 1983 - director
- Starlife - documentary short, Sidney Goldsmith 1983 - producer
- Starbreaker - short film, Bruce Mackay 1984 - special effects
- Transitions - documentary short, IMAX 1986 - writer and, with Tony Ianzelo, director
- Emergency - short film, IMAX 1988 - writer, co-director with Tony Ianzelo
- Echoes of the Sun - documentary short, IMAX, Nelson Max and Roman Kroitor 1990 - writer
- Momentum - documentary short, IMAX 1992 - co-director with Tony Ianzelo
- Making Momentum - documentary short 1996 - director, with Tony Ianzelo
- Path of the Paddle: Quiet Water - documentary, Bill Mason 1996 - producer
- Path of the Paddle: White Water - documentary, Bill Mason 1996 - producer
- Louisbourg Under Siege - documentary, Albert Kish 1997 - co-cinematographer with Tony Ianzelo, Ernest McNabb and Kent Nason
- Moving Pictures - documentary, 2000 - director and, with Boyce Richardson, writer

== Awards ==
As Director, Executive Producer or Producer

Cadet Rousselle (1946)

- Filmfestival del Garda, Gardone Riviera: Award of Merit, 1949
- American Film and Video Festival, New York: Blue Ribbon, 1960
- Columbus International Film & Animation Festival, Columbus, Ohio: Chris Statuette, 1961
- Columbus International Film & Animation Festival, Columbus, Ohio: Chris Certificate, Education, Art and Music, 1961

The Romance of Transportation in Canada (1952)

- 1953 Cannes Film Festival, Cannes, France: Award for Best Animation, 1953
- 7th British Academy Film Awards, London: BAFTA Special Award, 1954
- 25th Academy Awards, Los Angeles: Nominee, Best Short Subject, Cartoons, 1953

Age of the Beaver (1952)

- 5th Canadian Film Awards, Toronto: Honorable Mention, Non-Theatrical, 1953

Corral (1954)

- Venice Film Festival, Venice, Italy: First Prize, Documentary Films, 1954
- Durban International Film Festival, Durban, South Africa: Second Prize/Bronze Medal, Documentary, 1954
- Edinburgh International Film Festival, Edinburgh, Scotland: Diploma of Merit, Arts, 1954
- Golden Reel International Film Festival, Film Council of America, New York: Recognition of Merit, 1955
- 7th Canadian Film Awards, Toronto: Special Mention, Non-Theatrical Short, 1955

Riches of the Earth (1954)

- 7th Canadian Film Awards, Toronto: Best Film, Non-Theatrical Short, 1955
- International Survey of Scientific and Didactic Films, Padua, Italy: First Award for Best Film, 1956

A Thousand Million Years (1954)

- Venice Film Festival, Venice: Honourable Mention, Scientific Films, 1954

One Little Indian (1954)

- 7th Canadian Film Awards, Toronto: Honorable Mention, Non-Theatrical, 1955
- National Committee on Films for Safety, Chicago: First Prize, Bronze Plaque, Traffic & Transportation, 1955
- Golden Reel International Film Festival, Film Council of America, New York: Recognition of Merit, 1955
- Kootenay Film Festival, Nelson, British Columbia: Certificate of Merit, Second Award, Artistic Achievement, 1955
- Rapallo International Film Festival, Rapallo, Italy: Great Cup of the Province of Genoa, 1956
- Rapallo International Film Festival, Rapallo, Italy: First Prize & Silver Medal, Abstract Films, 1956

The Jolifou Inn (1955)

- 8th Canadian Film Awards, Stratford, Ontario: Honorable Mention, Theatrical Short, 1956
- Yorkton Film Festival, Yorkton, Saskatchewan: Golden Sheaf Award, Best Film, Creative Arts, 1956
- Kootenay Film Festival, Nelson, British Columbia: First Achievement Award, 1957
- Ibero-American-Filipino Documentary Film Contest, Bilbao, Spain: Best Film of an Educational and Cultural Character, 1959
- Ibero-American-Filipino Documentary Film Contest, Bilbao, Spain: Special Prize, 1959

Gold (1955)

- Edinburgh International Film Festival, Edinburgh, Scotland: Diploma of Merit, 1955
- 8th Canadian Film Awards, Stratford, Ontario: Gold Award, Theatrical Short, 1956

City of Gold (1957)

- 1957 Cannes Film Festival, Cannes, France: First Prize, Documentary, 1957
- Cork International Film Festival, Cork, Ireland: First Prize - Statuette of St. Finbarr, General Interest 1957
- 10th Canadian Film Awards, Toronto: Genie Award, Film of the Year 1958
- 10th Canadian Film Awards, Toronto: Genie Award, Best Film, Arts and Experimental, 1958
- Yorkton Film Festival, Yorkton, Saskatchewan: Golden Sheaf Award, Best Film, General 1958
- International Festival of Mountain and Exploration Films, Trento, Italy: Gold Medal 1958
- Chicago Festival of Contemporary Arts, University of Illinois Chicago: Documentary Prize 1958
- International Festival of Films on People and Countries, La Spezia, Italy: Gold Caravelle, 2nd prize 1958
- Vancouver International Film Festival, Vancouver: First Prize, Documentary 1958
- SODRE International Festival of Documentary and Experimental Films, Montevideo, Uruguay: Honourable Mention 1958
- Robert J. Flaherty Film Awards, City College Institute of Film Techniques: Honourable Mention, 1958
- Ibero-American-Filipino Documentary Film Contest, Bilbao, Spain: First Prize, 1959
- American Film and Video Festival, New York: Blue Ribbon, History & Biography, 1959
- Columbus International Film & Animation Festival, Columbus, Ohio: Chris Award, First Prize 1960
- Festival dei Popoli, Florence, Italy: Gold Medal, 1960
- Festival of Experimental and Documentary Films, Santiago, Chile: Honourable Mention 1960
- 30th Academy Awards, Los Angeles: Nominee, Short Subject, Live Action, 1958

City Out of Time (1959)

- Vancouver International Film Festival, Vancouver: Special Diploma, Fine Arts, 1960

A is for Architecture (1960)

- Yorkton Film Festival, Yorkton, Saskatchewan: Golden Sheaf Award, First Prize, 1960
- 12th Canadian Film Awards, Toronto: Genie Award for Best Film, General Information, 1960
- Ibero-American-Filipino Documentary Film Contest, Bilbao, Spain: Special CIDALC Prize, Silver Medal, 1960
- International Exhibition of Electronics, Nuclear Energy, Radio, Television and Cinema, Trieste, Italy: Silver Cup, 1960
- Rapallo International Film Festival, Rapallo, Italy: Third Prize - Silver Cup and Medal, 1960
- Yorkton Film Festival, Yorkton, Saskatchewan: Certificate of Merit, 1960
- Columbus International Film & Animation Festival, Columbus, Ohio: Chris Award, First Prize, 1962

Circle of the Sun (1960)

- 14th Canadian Film Awards: Genie Award for Best Film, General Information, 1962
- Yorkton Film Festival, Yorkton, Saskatchewan: Golden Sheaf Award, First Prize, 1962
- Festival of Tourist and Folklore Films, Brussels: Best Film on Folklore, 1962
- La Plata International Children's Film Festival, La Plata, Argentina: Silver Oak Leaf, First Prize, Documentary, 1962
- Electronic, Nuclear and Teleradio Cinematographic Review, Rome: First Prize, Tourist Films, 1962
- SODRE International Festival of Documentary and Experimental Films, Montevideo, Uruguay: Honorable Mention, 1962
- Festival dei Popoli/International Film Festival on Social Documentary, Florence, Italy: Honorable Mention, 1962
- Victoria Film Festival, Victoria, British Columbia: Best Film, 1963
- International Tourism Film Festival, Tarbes, France: Diploma of Honour and Trophy, 1967

Universe (1960)

- Cannes Film Festival, Cannes, France: Jury Prize for Exceptional Animation Quality, 1960
- Cannes Film Festival, Cannes, France: Technical Mention of the Commission Supérieure Technique du Cinéma Français, 1960
- Yorkton Film Festival, Yorkton, Saskatchewan: Golden Sheaf Award, Best Film of the Festival, 1960
- Vancouver International Film Festival, Vancouver: First Prize, Documentary, 1960
- Vancouver International Film Festival, Vancouver: Diploma, Scientific Films, 1960
- International Festival of Scientific and Technical Films, Belgrade, Serbia: Diploma of Honour, 1960
- Stratford Film Festival, Stratford, Ontario: Special Commendation, 1960
- Cork International Film Festival, Cork, Ireland: First Prize, Diploma of Merit, 1960
- Edinburgh International Film Festival, Edinburgh, Scotland: Diploma of Merit, Science, 1960
- 14th British Academy Film Awards, London: BAFTA Award for Best Animated Film, 1961
- 13th Canadian Film Awards: Genie Award for Film of the Year, 1961
- 13th Canadian Film Awards: Genie Award for Best Theatrical Short, 1961
- Philadelphia International Festival of Short Films, Philadelphia: Award for Exceptional Merit, 1961
- Salerno Film Festival, Salerno, Italy: First Prize – Documentary, 1961
- American Film and Video Festival, New York: Blue Ribbon, Science and Mathematics, 1961
- Columbus International Film & Animation Festival, Columbus, Ohio: Chris Award, Information/Education, 1961
- Rapallo International Film Festival, Rapallo, Italy: Cup of the Minister of Tourism and Entertainment, 1961
- Mar del Plata International Film Festival, Mar del Plata, Argentina: Grand Prize, 1962
- International Festival of Educational Films, Mar del Plata, Argentina: Best Documentary, 1962
- La Plata International Children's Festival, La Plata, Argentina: Silver Oak Leaf, First Prize, Scientific Films, 1962
- Scientific Film Festival, Caracas, Venezuela: Award of Merit, 1963
- Scholastic Teacher Magazine Annual Film Awards: Award of Merit, 1963
- International Educational Film Festival, Tehran: Golden Delfan, First Prize, Scientific Films, 1964
- Educational Film Library Association of America, New York: Nomination, 10 Best Films of the Decade List, 1968
- 33rd Academy Awards, Los Angeles: Nominee: Best Documentary Short Subject, 1961

Hors-d'oeuvre (1960)

- 13th Canadian Film Awards: Award of Merit, Sales and Promotion, 1961

Do You Know the Milky Way? (1961)

- International Days of Short Films, Tours, France: Special Jury Prize, 1961
- Columbus International Film & Animation Festival, Columbus, Ohio: Chris Award, Experimental, 1962

Very Nice, Very Nice (1961)

- 34th Academy Awards – Nominee, Academy Award for Best Live Action Short Film, 1962

The Days of Whiskey Gap (1961)

- Canadian Historical Association, Toronto: Certificate of Merit "for outstanding contribution to local history in Canada", 1962
- Vancouver International Film Festival, Vancouver: Honorable Mention, Sociology, 1962

Pot-pourri (1962)

- 14th Canadian Film Awards, Toronto: Award of Merit - Filmed Commercials (Public Service), 1962

My Financial Career (1962)

- Golden Gate International Film Festival, San Francisco: First Prize, Animated Film, 1962
- American Film and Video Festival, New York: Blue Ribbon, Literature in Films, 1964
- 36th Academy Awards, Los Angeles: Nominee, Best Short Subject, Cartoons, 1963

21-87 (1963)

- Ann Arbor Film Festival, Ann Arbor, Michigan: First Prize, 1964
- Palo Alto Filmmakers’ Festival, Palo Alto: Second Prize, 1964
- Midwest Film Festival, University of Chicago, Chicago: Most Popular Film, 1964

I Know an Old Lady Who Swallowed a Fly (1963)

- Chicago International Film Festival, Chicago: Certificate of Merit – Cartoons, 1965
- Zlín Film Festival/International Film Festival for Children and Youth, Gottwaldov, Czechoslovakia: Diploma of Merit, 1965
- Santa Barbara Children's Film Festival, Santa Barbara, California: Second Satellite Award, Short Entertainment, 1966

Free Fall (1964)

- Golden Gate International Film Festival, San Francisco: Award of Merit, 1964
- Montreal International Film Festival, Montreal: Honorable Mention, Shorts, 1964

The Hutterites (1964)

- Montreal International Film Festival, Montreal: First Prize, Shorts, 1964
- Columbus International Film & Animation Festival, Columbus, Ohio: Chris Award, First Prize, Religion, 1964
- Yorkton Film Festival, Yorkton, Saskatchewan: Golden Sheaf Award, First Prize, Human Relations, 1964
- Melbourne Film Festival, Melbourne: Honorable Mention, 1964
- American Film and Video Festival, New York: Blue Ribbon, Doctrinal and Denominational Topics, 1965
- Landers Associates Awards, Los Angeles: Award of Merit, 1965
- Festival dei Popoli/International Film Festival on Social Documentary, Florence, Italy: Second Prize, 1965

The Children of Fogo Island (1967)

- Conference on Children, Washington, DC: Certificate of Merit, 1970

The Sea (1971)

- 23rd Canadian Film Awards, Toronto: Genie Award for Best Documentary Under 30 minutes, 1971
- International Film Festival of Man, Air, Water, Versailles: First Prize of the Festival, 1972
- MIFED (Mercato internazionale del film e del documentario), Milan: Jury Award - Gold Medal of the President of the Republic, 1972
- Melbourne International Film Festival, Melbourne: Diploma of Merit, 1972
- International Week of Nautical Cinema, Palma: Gold Anchovy, 1974
- International Documentary Film Days on the Environment, Ouistreham-Riva-Bella: Gold Medal and Grand Prize of the President of the Republic, 1974

Here is Canada (1972)

- Festival of Tourist and Folklore Films, Brussels: Award of the Ministry of National Education, 1973
- Golden Gate International Film Festival, San Francisco: First Prize, Special Jury Mention, 1973

The Question of TV Violence (1972)

- Columbus International Film & Animation Festival, Columbus, Ohio: Chris Award, Best Documentary, 1973

Coming Home (1973)

- 25th Canadian Film Awards, Montreal: Genie Award for Best Theatrical Documentary, 1973

Sub-Igloo (1973)

- International Oceanographic Film Festival, Bordeaux, France: First Prize, 1976

The Man Who Can't Stop (1973)

- Chicago International Film Festival, Chicago: Certificate of Merit, 1974

Child, Part 1: Jamie, Ethan and Marlon: The First Two Months (1973)

- Columbus International Film & Animation Festival, Columbus, Ohio: Chris Award, Bronze Plaque, Education, 1976

Cree Hunters of Mistassini (1974)

- 28th British Academy Film Awards, London: BAFTA Award for Best Documentary (Robert Flaherty Award), 1975
- 26th Canadian Film Awards, Niagara-on-the-Lake, ON: Genie Award for Best Documentary, 1975
- Melbourne Film Festival: Silver Boomerang, Best Film Made for TV, 1975

Sananguagat: Inuit Masterworks (1974)

- Festival international du film sur l'art, Paris: Grand Prize, 1975
- International Tourism Film Festival, Tarbes, France: Award of Merit, 1975

Another Side of the Forest (1974)

- International Green Film Week, Berlin, Germany: Silver Ear of Corn Award, Natural Environment, 1976

Bate's Car: Sweet as a Nut (1974)

- Biofest, Novi Sad, Yugoslavia: Award of Merit, 1976

In Praise of Hands (1974)

- International Craft Film Festival, New York: Award of Merit, 1976
- International Festival of Television Programs of Folk Crafts (RADUGA), Moscow: Diploma for Impressive Transmission of Deep Thought of Unity of the Sources of Folk Creativity, 1979

In Search of the Bowhead Whale (1974)

- American Film and Video Festival, New York: Blue Ribbon, Environment, Nature and Wildlife, 1975
- St. Thomas International Film Festival, St. Thomas, U.S. Virgin Islands: Silver Venus Medallion for Best Film, TV Documentary, 1975
- Columbus International Film & Animation Festival, Columbus, Ohio: Chris Award, 1976
- International Wildlife Film Festival, Missoula, Montana: Highest Merit, Non-Invited Films, 1978
- Black Orca Film Festival, Seattle: Best Film, Exploration & Discovery, 1978
- International Festival of Films on the Arctic, Dieppe, France: Jules Verne Award for Best Exploration Film, 1983

Waiting for Fidel (1974)

- American Film and Video Festival, New York: Red Ribbon, World Concerns, 1976

King of the Hill (1974)

- International Short Film Festival Oberhausen, Oberhausen, Germany: Main Prize by the International Jury for Cinema and Television Films, 1975

Arctic IV (1975)

- International Festival of Mountain and Exploration Films, Trento, Italy: Special Mention, 1977

Jack Rabbit (1975)

- International Ski Film Festival, New York: Award of Merit, 1976

Descent (1975)

- Banff Mountain Film Festival, Banff, Alberta: Best Film of the Festival, 1977
- Banff Mountain Film Festival, Banff, Alberta: Best Film Produced by a Canadian, 1977

The Lady and the Owl (1975)

- Columbus International Film & Animation Festival, Columbus, Ohio: Chris Bronze Plaque, 1977

Musicanada (1975)

- Golden Gate International Film Festival, San Francisco: Special Jury Award, 1976

Blackwood (1976)

- Festival international du film sur l'art, Paris: Grand Prize for the Quality of the Image, 1977
- Festival of Tourist and Folklore Films, Brussels: Prize of the Principality of Monaco for the Best Film Evocating the Past of a Region by the Means of Art, 1977
- Yorkton Film Festival, Yorkton, Saskatchewan: Golden Sheaf Award, Best Short Film, 1977
- 49th Academy Awards, Los Angeles: Nominee, Best Documentary Short Subject, 1977

A Great White Bird (1976)

- Salerno Film Festival, Salerno, Italy: First Prize – Documentary, 1979

High Grass Circus (1976)

- Yorkton Film Festival, Yorkton, Saskatchewan: Golden Sheaf Award, Best Film of the Festival, 1977
- Film Advisory Board, Los Angeles: Award of Excellence, 1978
- 50th Academy Awards, Los Angeles: Nominee: Best Documentary Feature, 1978

The Land: A New Priority (1976)

- International Contest of Agrarian Cinema, Zaragoza, Spain: EXCMA Trophy for Best Film, 1978

Log House (1976)

- Festival of Tourist and Folklore Films, Brussels: Prize of the Belgian National Centre of Films for Children, 1977
- American Film and Video Festival, New York: Blue Ribbon, Environmental Issues, 1980

Waterloo Farmers (1976)

- Festival of Agricultural Films & Rural Themes, Santarém, Portugal: Bronze Bunch, Third Prize, 1976

Los Canadienses (1976)

- International Filmfestival Mannheim-Heidelberg, Mannheim: Special Mention from the Fédération internationale de la presse cinématographique, 1976
- International Filmfestival Mannheim-Heidelberg, Mannheim: Special Prize for the Best Film, 1976
- Chicago International Film Festival, Chicago: Silver Hugo Award, 1977
- Yorkton Film Festival, Yorkton, Saskatchewan: Golden Sheaf Award, Best Documentary, 1977
- Melbourne Film Festival: TV Award for Best Film Made for TV, 1977
- American Film and Video Festival, New York: Blue Ribbon, International History and Culture, 1977
- 30th British Academy Film Awards, London: BAFTA Award for Best Documentary, 1977

Path of the Paddle: Doubles Whitewater (1977)

- International Short Film Festival Oberhausen, Oberhausen, Germany: Grand Prix of the Cultural Ministry of Nordrhein-Westfalen, 1977
- Golden Gate International Film Festival, San Francisco: Special Jury Award for Outstanding Achievement - Film as Communication, 1977
- Columbus International Film & Animation Festival, Columbus, Ohio: Chris Bronze Plaque, Education, 1978
- 31st British Academy Film Awards, London: BAFTA award for Best Specialised Film, 1978
- C.I.D.A.L.C. International Festival of Sports Films, Rennes, France: René Barthélemy Award 1982
- International Film Festival for River Descent, Vénissieux, France: Best Script (to Bill Mason), 1983

Standing Alone (1982)

- HEMISFILM, San Antonio TX: Bronze Medallion for Best Long Documentary, 1983
- International Film Festival for Children and Young People, Vancouver: Certificate of Merit, 1983

Starlife (1983)

- Golden Gate International Film Festival, San Francisco: Honorable Mention, 1985

Momentum (1992)

- International Audiovisual Festival (FIAV), Seville, Spain: Award for Technical Quality of the Image, 1992

Moving Pictures (2000)

- Columbus International Film & Animation Festival, Columbus, Ohio: Chris Bronze Plaque, Arts
