= BAFTA Award for Best Documentary =

British film industry award

- Awarded for: In recognition of the number of high-quality theatrical documentaries released in cinemas
- Country: United Kingdom
- Presented by: British Academy of Film and Television Arts
- First award: 1948
- Currently held by: Mr Nobody Against Putin (2025)
- Website: BAFTA Website

The BAFTA Award for Best Documentary is a film award presented annually by the British Academy of Film and Television Arts (BAFTA) at the British Academy Film Awards. It was formerly known as the Robert Flaherty Documentary Award.

In the following lists, the titles and names in bold with a gold background are the winners and recipients respectively; those not in bold are the nominees. The years given are those in which the films under consideration were released, not the year of the ceremony, which always takes place the following year.

== History ==
British Academy of Film and Television Arts is a British organisation that hosts annual awards shows for film, television, and video games (and formerly also for children's film and television). A theatrical documentary award was presented by the Academy between 1948 and 1990. Documentaries have continued to be honoured with British Academy Television Awards since then and have been eligible in all relevant categories at the Film Awards. In 2012, the Academy re-introduced this category in recognition of the number of high-quality theatrical documentaries released in cinemas in the UK each year.

== Winners and nominees ==
indicates the winner

=== 1940s ===
Year	Film	Director
**1948** (2nd)	**Louisiana Story**	**Robert J. Flaherty**
**1948** (2nd)	Farrebique	Georges Rouquier
**1948** (2nd)	Is Everybody Listening?	Jackson Beck
**1948** (2nd)	Shadow of the Ruhr	Sergei Nolbandov
**1948** (2nd)	Those Blasted Kids	Astrid Henning-Jensen and Bjarne Henning-Jensen
**1948** (2nd)	Three Dawns to Sydney	John Eldridge
**1949** (3rd)	**Daybreak in Udi**	**Terry Bishop**
**1949** (3rd)	Circulation	
**1949** (3rd)	The Cornish Engine	Bill Mason and Philip Armitage
**1949** (3rd)	Drug Addict	Robert Anderson
**1949** (3rd)	Island of the Lagoon (Isole Nella Laguna)	Luciano Emmer and Enrico Gras
**1949** (3rd)	The Liver Fluke in Great Britain	John Shearman
**1949** (3rd)	Report on the Refugee Problem	

=== 1950s ===
Year	Film	Director
**1950** (4th)	**The Undefeated**	**Paul Dickson**
**1950** (4th)	Inland Waterways	R.K. Neilson-Baxter
**1950** (4th)	Kon-Tiki	Thor Heyerdahl
**1950** (4th)	Green is the Mountain (La Montagne est Verte)	Jean Lehérissey
**1950** (4th)	Seal Island	James Algar
**1950** (4th)	The Vatican	Hans M. Nieter
**1950** (4th)	Life Begins Tomorrow (La Vie Commence Demain)	Nicole Védrès
**1951** (5th)	**Beaver Valley**	**James Algar**
**1951** (5th)	Visit to Picasso (Bezoek aan Picasso)	Paul Haesaerts
**1951** (5th)	David	Paul Dickson
**1951** (5th)	A Family Affair	Margaret Thomson
**1951** (5th)	Family Portrait	Humphrey Jennings
**1951** (5th)	Oil for the Twentieth Century	Peter Bradford
**1951** (5th)	Out of True	Philip Leacock
**1952** (6th)	**Royal Journey**	**David Bairstow, Gudrun Parker and Roger Blais**
**1952** (6th)	Fishermen of Negombo	
**1952** (6th)	Highlights of Farnborough 1952	Peter De Normanville
**1952** (6th)	Journey into History	John Taylor
**1952** (6th)	Le Mans 1952	Bill Mason
**1952** (6th)	Nature's Half Acre	James Algar
**1952** (6th)	Ocean Terminal	J.B. Holmes
**1952** (6th)	The Open Window	Henri Storck
**1952** (6th)	Opera School	Gudrun Parker
**1952** (6th)	Rig 20	David Villiers and Ronald H. Riley
**1952** (6th)	The Streamlined Pig	Jørgen Roos
**1953** (7th)	**The Conquest of Everest**	**George Lowe**
**1953** (7th)	White Mane (Crin Blanc)	Albert Lamorisse
**1953** (7th)	Elizabeth is Queen	Terry Ashwood
**1953** (7th)	Pictures of the Middle Ages (Images Medievales)	William Novik
**1953** (7th)	Kumak, The Sleepy Hunter	Alma Duncan
**1953** (7th)	Mille Miglia	Bill Mason
**1953** (7th)	Operation Hurricane	Ronald Stark
**1953** (7th)	A Queen Is Crowned	Christopher Fry
**1953** (7th)	Teeth of the Wind	Michael Hankinson
**1953** (7th)	Life in the Arctic (Vo l'dakh Okeana)	Aleksandr Zguridi
**1953** (7th)	Water Birds	Ben Sharpsteen
**1953** (7th)	World Without End	Basil Wright and Paul Rotha
**1954** (8th)	**The Great Adventure (Det Stora Äventyret)**	**Arne Sucksdorff**
**1954** (8th)	Back of Beyond	John Heyer
**1954** (8th)	Lekko!	Herman van der Horst
**1954** (8th)	3-2-1-Zero	
**1954** (8th)	Thursday's Children	Guy Brenton and Lindsay Anderson
**1955** (9th)	**The Vanishing Prairie**	**James Algar**
**1955** (9th)	Gold	Colin Low
**1955** (9th)	Miner's Window	John Ferno
**1955** (9th)	The Rival World	Bert Haanstra
**1956** (10th)	**On the Bowery**	**Lionel Rogosin**
**1956** (10th)	Foothold in Antarctica	Derek Williams
**1956** (10th)	Generator 4	F. R. Crawley
**1956** (10th)	The Silent World (Le Monde Du Silence)	Jacques Cousteau and Louis Malle
**1956** (10th)	Under the Same Sky	Kurt Weber
**1957** (11th)	**Journey into Spring**	**Ralph Keene**
**1957** (11th)	City of Gold	Colin Low and Wolf Koenig
**1957** (11th)	Every Day Except Christmas	Lindsay Anderson
**1957** (11th)	Holiday	
**1957** (11th)	The USA in the Thirties	
**1958** (12th)	**Glass (Glas)**	**Bert Haanstra**
**1958** (12th)	The Forerunner	John Heyer
**1958** (12th)	Jabulani Afrika	Jamie Uys
**1958** (12th)	LS Lowry	John Read
**1958** (12th)	Secrets of the Reef	Murray Lerner, Lloyd Ritter and Robert M. Young
**1958** (12th)	Wonders of Chicago	Harry Foster
**1959** (13th)	**The Savage Eye**	**Joseph Strick, Sidney Meyers and Ben Maddow**
**1959** (13th)	This is the BBC	Richard Cawston
**1959** (13th)	We Are the Lambeth Boys	Karel Reisz
**1959** (13th)	White Wilderness	James Algar

=== 1960s ===
Year	Film	Recipient(s)
**1960** (14th)	**Not awarded**	
**1961** (15th)	**Le Rendezvous du diable**	**Haroun Tazieff**
**1962** (16th)	**Not awarded**	
**1963** (17th)	**Not awarded**	
**1964** (18th)	**Nobody Waved Good-bye**	**Don Owen**
**1964** (18th)	The Human Dutch	Bert Haanstra
**1964** (18th)	The Life of Billy Walker	
**1964** (18th)	Portrait of Queenie	Michael Orrom
**1965** (19th)	**Tokyo Olympiad**	**Kon Ichikawa**
**1965** (19th)	Brute Force and Finesse	Max Morgan-Witts
**1965** (19th)	Deckie Learner	Michael Grigsby
**1965** (19th)	Stravinsky	Roman Kroitor and Wolf Koenig
**1966** (20th)	**Goal! The World Cup**	**Abidine Dino and Ross Devenish**
**1966** (20th)	Buster Keaton Rides Again	John Spotton
**1966** (20th)	I'm Going to Ask You to Get Up Out of Your Seat	Richard Cawston
**1966** (20th)	Matador	Kevin Billington
**1967** (21st)	**To Die in Madrid**	**Frédéric Rossif**
**1967** (21st)	Famine	Jack Gold
**1967** (21st)	The Things I Cannot Change	Tanya Ballantyne
**1968** (22nd)	**In Need of Special Care**	**Jonathan Stedall**
**1968** (22nd)	Inside North Vietnam	Felix Greene
**1968** (22nd)	Music!	Michael Tuchner
**1968** (22nd)	A Plague On Your Children	Adrian Malone
**1969** (23rd)	**Prologue**	**Robin Spry**

=== 1970s ===
Year	Film	Recipient(s)
**1970** (24th)	**Sad Song of Yellow Skin**	**Michael Rubbo**
**1971** (25th)	**The Hellstrom Chronicle**	**Walon Green**
**1971** (25th)	Death of a Legend	Bill Mason
**1972** (26th)	**Not awarded**	
**1973** (27th)	**Grierson**	**Roger Blais**
**1974** (28th)	**Cree Hunters of Mistassini**	**Boyce Richardson and Tony Ianzelo**
**1974** (28th)	Compañero: Victor Jara of Chile	Stanley Forman and Martin Smith
**1974** (28th)	Leprosy	
**1975** (29th)	**The Early Americans**	**Alan Pendry**
**1975** (29th)	Seven Green Bottles	Eric Marquis
**1976** (30th)	**Los Canadienses**	**Albert Kish**
**1976** (30th)	White Rock	Tony Maylam
**1977** (31st)	**Not awarded**	
**1978** (32nd)	**The Silent Witness**	**David Rolfe**
**1979** (33rd)	**The Tree of Wooden Clogs**	**Ermanno Olmi**

=== 1980s ===
Year	Film	Recipient(s)
**1980** (34th)	**Not awarded**	
**1981** (35th)	**Soldier Girls**	**Nick Broomfield and Joan Churchill**
**1981** (35th)	Best Boy	Ira Wohl
**1981** (35th)	The Life and Times of Rosie the Riveter	Connie Field
**1981** (35th)	Return Journey	Ian Potts
**1982** (36th)	**Burden of Dreams**	**Les Blank**
**1982** (36th)	The Atomic Café	Kevin Rafferty, Jayne Loader and Pierce Rafferty
**1982** (36th)	Not a Love Story	Bonnie Sherr Klein
**1982** (36th)	The Weavers: Wasn't That a Time!	Jim Brown
**1983** (37th)	**Schindler**	**Jon Blair**
**1983** (37th)	Forty Minutes: Female Circumcision	Louise Panton
**1983** (37th)	The Visit: Part 3 - The Boy David	Alex McCall
**1983** (37th)	Wildlife on One: Night Life	Dilys Breese
**1984** (38th)	**28 Up**	**Michael Apted**
**1984** (38th)	GI Brides	Lavinia Warner
**1984** (38th)	South Bank Show: Alan Bennett	David Hinton
**1984** (38th)	Afghanistan Reports: Allah Against The Gunships	Sandy Gall
**1985** (39th)	**Omnibus: Leonard Berstein's West Side Story**	**Christopher Swann**
**1985** (39th)	Marilyn Monroe: Say Goodbye to the President	Christopher Olgiati
**1985** (39th)	David Lean: A Life in Film	Nigel Wattis
**1985** (39th)	The Frozen Ocean: Part 1 - Kingdom of the Ice Bear	Mike Salisbury and Hugh Miles
**1986** (40th)	**Shoah**	**Claude Lanzmann**
**1986** (40th)	Viewpoint '86: Afghanistan: The Agony of a Nation	Sandy Gall
**1986** (40th)	Omnibus: The Mission	Robin Lough
**1986** (40th)	Forty Minutes: The Fishing Party	Paul Watson
**1986** (40th)	Equinox: Prisoner of Consciousness	John Dollar
**1986** (40th)	British Cinema: Personal View - A Turnip Head's Guide to the British Cinema	Alan Parker
**1987** (41st)	**Baka: The People of the Rainforest**	**Phil Agland**
**1987** (41st)	Man-Eating Tigers/Saving the Tiger	Naresh Bedi
**1987** (41st)	Fourteen Days in May	Paul Hamann
**1987** (41st)	Forty Minutes: Home from the Hill	Molly Dineen
**1988** (42nd)	**This Week: Death on the Rock**	**Chris Oxley**
**1988** (42nd)	The Duty Men: East Enders	Paul Hamann
**1988** (42nd)	In from the Cold: A Portrait of Richard Burton	Tony Palmer
**1988** (42nd)	Viewpoint Special: The Men Who Killed Kennedy	Nigel Turner
**1989** (43rd)	**First Tuesday: Four Hours in My Lai**	**Kevin Sim**
**1989** (43rd)	Viewpoint '89: Cambodia - Year 10: A Special Report by John Pilger	David Munro
**1989** (43rd)	Lost Children of the Empire	Joanna Mack and Mike Fox
**1989** (43rd)	Everyman: Romania - State of Fear	John Blake

=== 2010s ===
Year	Film	Recipient(s)
**2011** (65th)	**Senna**	**Tim Bevan, Eric Fellner, James Gay-Rees, Asif Kapadia and Manish Pandey**
**2011** (65th)	George Harrison: Living in the Material World	Olivia Harrison, Martin Scorsese and Nigel Sinclair
**2011** (65th)	Project Nim	Simon Chinn and James Marsh
**2012** (66th)	**Searching for Sugar Man**	**Malik Bendjelloul and Simon Chinn**
**2012** (66th)	The Imposter	Bart Layton and Dimitri Doganis
**2012** (66th)	McCullin	David Morris and Jacqui Morris
**2012** (66th)	Marley	Kevin Macdonald, Steve Bing and Charles Steel
**2012** (66th)	West of Memphis	Amy J. Berg
**2013** (67th)	**The Act of Killing**	**Joshua Oppenheimer**
**2013** (67th)	The Armstrong Lie	Alex Gibney
**2013** (67th)	Blackfish	Gabriela Cowperthwaite
**2013** (67th)	Tim's Vermeer	Teller, Penn Jillette and Farley Ziegler
**2013** (67th)	We Steal Secrets: The Story of WikiLeaks	Alex Gibney
**2014** (68th)	**Citizenfour**	**Laura Poitras, Mathilde Bonnefoy and Dirk Wilutzky**
**2014** (68th)	20 Feet from Stardom	Morgan Neville, Caitrin Rogers and Gil Friesen
**2014** (68th)	20,000 Days on Earth	Iain Forsyth and Jane Pollard
**2014** (68th)	Finding Vivian Maier	John Maloof and Charlie Siskel
**2014** (68th)	Virunga	Orlando von Einsiedel and Joanna Natasegara
**2015** (69th)	**Amy**	**James Gay-Rees and Asif Kapadia**
**2015** (69th)	Cartel Land	Matthew Heineman and Tom Yellin
**2015** (69th)	He Named Me Malala	Davis Guggenheim, Laurie MacDonald and Walter Parkes
**2015** (69th)	Listen to Me Marlon	John Battsek, George Chignell, R. J. Cutler and Stevan Riley
**2015** (69th)	Sherpa	Bridget Ikin, Jennifer Peedom and John Smithson
**2016** (70th)	**13th**	**Ava DuVernay, Spencer Averick, Howard Barish**
**2016** (70th)	The Beatles: Eight Days a Week – The Touring Years	Ron Howard, Brian Grazer, Scott Pascucci and Nigel Sinclair
**2016** (70th)	The Eagle Huntress	Otto Bell and Stacey Reiss
**2016** (70th)	Notes on Blindness	Peter Middleton and James Spinney
**2016** (70th)	Weiner	Josh Kriegman and Elyse Steinberg
**2017** (71st)	**I Am Not Your Negro**	**Raoul Peck**
**2017** (71st)	City of Ghosts	Matthew Heineman
**2017** (71st)	Icarus	Bryan Fogel and Dan Cogan
**2017** (71st)	An Inconvenient Sequel	Bonni Cohen and Jon Shenk
**2017** (71st)	Jane	Brett Morgen and Bryan Burk
**2018** (72nd)	**Free Solo**	**Elizabeth Chai Vasarhelyi, Jimmy Chin, Shannon Dill and Evan Hayes**
**2018** (72nd)	McQueen	Ian Bonhôte and Peter Ettedgui
**2018** (72nd)	RBG	Julie Cohen and Betsy West
**2018** (72nd)	They Shall Not Grow Old	Peter Jackson and Clare Olssen
**2018** (72nd)	Three Identical Strangers	Tim Wardle, Grace Hughes-Hallett and Becky Read
**2019** (73rd)	**For Sama**	**Waad al-Kateab and Edward Watts**
**2019** (73rd)	American Factory	Steven Bognar and Julia Reichert
**2019** (73rd)	Apollo 11	Todd Douglas Miller
**2019** (73rd)	Diego Maradona	Asif Kapadia, James Gay-Rees and Paul Martin
**2019** (73rd)	The Great Hack	Karim Amer and Jehane Noujaim

=== 2020s ===
Year	Film	Recipient(s)
**2020** (74th)	**My Octopus Teacher**	**Pippa Ehrlich, James Reed and Craig Foster**
**2020** (74th)	David Attenborough: A Life on Our Planet	Alastair Fothergill, Jonnie Hughes and Keith Scholey
**2020** (74th)	Collective	Alexander Nanau
**2020** (74th)	The Dissident	Bryan Fogel, Thor Halvorssen, Mark Monroe and Jake Swantko
**2020** (74th)	The Social Dilemma	Jeff Orlowski and Larissa Rhodes
**2021** (75th)	**Summer of Soul (...Or, When the Revolution Could Not Be Televised)**	**Ahmir "Questlove" Thompson, David Dinerstein, Robert Fyvolent and Joseph Patel**
**2021** (75th)	Becoming Cousteau	Liz Garbus and Dan Cogan
**2021** (75th)	Cow	Andrea Arnold and Kat Mansoor
**2021** (75th)	Flee	Jonas Poher Rasmussen and Monica Hellström
**2021** (75th)	The Rescue	Elizabeth Chai Vasarhelyi, Jimmy Chin, John Battsek and P. J. van Sandwijk
**2022** (76th)	**Navalny**	**Daniel Roher, Diane Becker, Shane Boris, Melanie Miller and Odessa Rae**
**2022** (76th)	All That Breathes	Shaunak Sen, Teddy Leifer and Aman Mann
**2022** (76th)	All the Beauty and the Bloodshed	Laura Poitras, Howard Gertler, Nan Goldin, Yoni Golijov and John Lyons
**2022** (76th)	Fire of Love	Sara Dosa, Shane Boris and Ina Fichman
**2022** (76th)	Moonage Daydream	Brett Morgen
**2023** (77th)	**20 Days in Mariupol**	**Mstyslav Chernov and Raney Aronson-Rath**
**2023** (77th)	American Symphony	Matthew Heineman, Lauren Domino and Joedan Okun
**2023** (77th)	Beyond Utopia	Madeleine Gavin, Rachel Cohen and Jana Edelbaum
**2023** (77th)	Still: A Michael J. Fox Movie	Davis Guggenheim, Jonathan King and Annetta Marion
**2023** (77th)	Wham!	Chris Smith
**2024** (78th)	**Super/Man: The Christopher Reeve Story**	**Ian Bonhôte, Peter Ettedgui, Lizzie Gillett, and Robert Ford**
**2024** (78th)	Black Box Diaries	Shiori Itō, Eric Nyari, and Hanna Aqvilin
**2024** (78th)	Daughters	Natalie Rae, Angela Patton, Lisa Mazzotta, Justin Benoliel, James Cunningham, Sam Bisbee, Kathryn Everett, and Laura Choi Raycroft
**2024** (78th)	No Other Land	Yuval Abraham, Basel Adra, Hamdan Ballal, and Rachel Szor
**2024** (78th)	Will & Harper	Josh Greenbaum, Rafael Marmor, Christopher Leggett, Will Ferrell, and Jessica Elbaum
**2025** (79th)	**Mr Nobody Against Putin**	**David Borenstein, Helle Faber, Radovan Síbrt, and Alžběta Karásková**
**2025** (79th)	2000 Meters to Andriivka	Mstyslav Chernov, Michelle Mizner, and Raney Aronson-Rath
**2025** (79th)	Apocalypse in the Tropics	Petra Costa and Alessandra Orofino
**2025** (79th)	Cover-Up	Laura Poitras, Mark Obenhaus, Olivia Streisand, and Yoni Golijev
**2025** (79th)	The Perfect Neighbor	Geeta Gandbhir, Alisa Payne, Nikon Kwantu, and Sam Bisbee

== See also ==
- Academy Award for Best Documentary Feature
- Critics' Choice Documentary Awards
- Cinema Eye Honors Awards
- IDA Documentary Awards
- Gotham Award for Best Documentary
- National Board of Review Award for Best Documentary Film
- Independent Spirit Award for Best Documentary Feature
