= Gold (1955 film) =

- Directed by: Colin Low
- Written by: Wolf Koenig
- Produced by: Tom Daly
- Cinematography: Wolf Koenig
- Edited by: Wolf Koenig
- Music by: Eldon Rathburn
- Production company: National Film Board of Canada
- Release date: 1955
- Running time: 11 minutes
- Country: Canada
- Language: English

Gold is a 1955 Canadian short documentary film, directed by Colin Low for the National Film Board of Canada.

The film documents the process of placer gold mining near Dawson City, Yukon and shows how gold is trapped and hand-sorted before becoming gold brick.

Low followed up with his 1957 film City of Gold, which centred on the history of Dawson City during the Klondike Gold Rush.

== Awards ==
- Edinburgh International Film Festival, Edinburgh, Scotland: Diploma of Merit, 1955
- 8th Canadian Film Awards, Stratford, Ontario: Gold Award, Theatrical Short 1956
- British Academy of Film and Television Arts, London: Nominee, BAFTA Award for Best Documentary, 1955
