= John Spotton =

Canadian filmmaker (1927–1991)

- Born: 8 August 1927; Toronto
- Died: 3 March 1991 (aged 63); Cuba
- Occupations: Cinematographer; Producer; Editor; Director
- Years active: 1947–1991
- Awards: see below

John Spotton C.S.C. (January 1, 1927 – March 3, 1991) was a Canadian filmmaker with the National Film Board of Canada.

A versatile artist who worked as a director, producer, cinematographer and editor, Spotton was best known for his role in developing the Direct Cinema genre of documentary and in the application of those techniques in narrative fiction films, in particular Nobody Waved Good-bye (1964), in which he served as cinematographer and editor.

An early member of the Canadian Society of Cinematographers (CSC), Spotton joined the NFB in 1949 after briefly working as an assistant cameraman with Shelly Films in Toronto, and remained there until his death, except for a period from 1970 to 1972 when he worked with Potterton Productions. He was executive producer of the NFB's Ontario Centre from 1982 to 1988."John Spotton". Canadian Film Encyclopedia. Toronto International Film Festival.

Until it closed in 2002, The NFB's theatre in Toronto was named The John Spotton Theatre. Until 2017, the Toronto International Film Festival Award for Best Canadian Short Film was the 'NFB John Spotton Award'.

== Personal life and death ==
Spotton drowned at the age of 64 while on vacation in Cuba. He was survived by his wife Doris.

== Filmography ==
For the National Film Board of Canada

- Sing with the Commodores - 3 short films, Roger Blais & Douglas Tunstell 1951 - cinematographer
- Fighting Forest Fires with Hand Tools - training film, Lawrence Cherry 1951 - cinematographer
- Trade Fair - documentary short, Robert Anderson 1952 - cinematographer
- The Puppeteers - documentary short, Jacques Giraldeau 1952 - cinematographer
- Epidemic Foot and Mouth Disease: Saskatchewan - documentary short, Larry Gosnell 1952 - cinematographer
- Eye Witness No. 39 - documentary short, Gordon Burwash 1952 - cinematographer
- Eye Witness No. 44 - documentary short, David Bairstow 1952 - cinematographer
- Eye Witness No. 49 - documentary short, David Bairstow 1952 - cinematographer
- Eye Witness No. 50 - documentary short, David Bairstow 1953 - cinematographer
- Pole Barns and Milking Parlours - documentary short, Larry Gosnell 1953 - cinematographer
- The World at Your Feet - documentary short, Larry Gosnell 1953 - cinematographer
- The Story of Peter and the Potter - short film, Donald Peters 1953 - cinematographer
- Surface Silos - documentary short, Larry Gosnell 1953 - cinematographer
- Security Depends on You - training film, Julian Biggs 1953 - cinematographer
- Royal Canadian Ordnance Corps: Field Operations - training film, Lawrence Cherry 1953 - cinematographer
- Forage Harvesting - documentary short, Larry Gosnell 1953 - cinematographer
- Eye Witness No. 67 - documentary short, Fernand Ménard & Robert Anderson 1954 - cinematographer
- Salt Cod - documentary short, Allan Wargon 1954 - cinematographer
- College in the Wilds - documentary short, Julian Biggs 1954 - cinematographer
- Frontier College - documentary short, Julian Biggs 1954 - cinematographer
- On the Spot: The Doll Factory - documentary short, Julian Biggs 1954 - cinematographer
- On the Spot: Deep Sleep - documentary short, Jack Olsen, 1954 - cinematographer
- On the Spot: Auto Production - documentary short, Jack Olsen 1954 - cinematographer
- On the Spot: Aviation Medicine - documentary short, Julian Biggs 1954 - cinematographer
- On the Spot: Food and Drug Patrol - documentary short, Allen Stark 1954 - cinematographer
- On the Spot: Hidden Power - documentary short, John Feeney 1954 - cinematographer
- On the Spot: Javanese Dancing - documentary short, Bernard Devlin 1954 - cinematographer
- On the Spot: The Magic Men - documentary short, Jack Olen 1954 - cinematographer
- On the Spot: Story of a Newspaper - documentary short, Julian Biggs 1954 - cinematographer
- On the Spot: Traffic Cop - documentary short, Jack Olsen 1954 - cinematographer
- On the Spot: Food Facts - documentary short, John Feeney 1954 - cinematographer
- On the Spot: Alcoholism - documentary short, Don Haldane 1955 - cinematographer
- Grain Handling in Canada - documentary short, Guy L. Coté 1955 - cinematographer
- Leaving It to the Experts - documentary short, Gudrun Parker 1955 - cinematographer
- Community Responsibilities - documentary short, Gudrun Parker 1955 - cinematographer
- Eye Witness No. 84 - documentary short, Hector Lemieux & Tim Wilson 1956 - cinematographer
- Designed for Living - documentary short, Jean Palardy 1956 - cinematographer
- Aural Null - documentary short, Michael Birch 1957 - cinematographer
- The Jet Beacon Let-Down - documentary short, Michael Birch & René Jodoin 1957 - cinematographer
- The Standard Range Approach - training film, Michael Birch & René Jodoin 1957 - cinematographer
- Battalion Intelligence Section - documentary short, Walford Hewitson 1957 - cinematographer
- Canadian Profile - documentary, Allan Wargon 1957 - cinematographer
- Feathers in the Wind - documentary short, Raymond Garceau 1957 - cinematographer
- Choosing a Leader - short film, Julia Murphy 1957 - cinematographer
- Being Different - short film, Julia Murphy 1957 - cinematographer
- A Day in June - documentary short, Louis Portugais 1958 - cinematographer
- Pilgrimage - documentary short, Candid Eye series, Terence Macartney-Filgate 1958 - co-producer with Roman Kroitor and Wolf Koenig
- The Skilled Worker - short film, Morten Parker 1958 - cinematographer
- The General Foreman - short film, Morten Parker 1958 - cinematographer
- The Man on the Assembly Line - short film, Morten Parker 1958 - cinematographer
- The Hands That Heal - documentary short, Gordon Sparling 1958 - cinematographer
- Railroaders - documentary short, Guy L. Coté 1958 - cinematographer
- Treasure of the Forest - documentary short, Roger Blais 1958 - cinematographer
- Log Drive - documentary short, Perspective series, Raymond Garceau 1958 - cinematographer
- River of Wood - documentary short, Raymond Garceau 1958 - cinematographer
- City Out of Time - documentary short, Colin Low 1959 - editor
- The Back-Breaking Leaf - documentary short, Terence Macartney-Filgate 1959 - editor
- Fishermen - documentary short, Guy L. Coté 1959 - cinematographer
- The St. Lawrence Seaway - documentary short, John Howe 1959 - cinematographer
- I Was a Ninety-Pound Weakling - documentary short, Wolf Koenig & Georges Dufaux 1960 - editor
- Railroaders (Revised) - documentary short, Guy L. Coté 1960 - cinematographer
- Circle of the Sun - documentary short, Colin Low 1960 - cinematographer
- The Days of Whisky Gap - documentary short, Colin Low 1961 - editor and cinematographer
- Lonely Boy - documentary short, Wolf Koenig & Roman Kroitor 1962 - editor
- Runner - documentary short, Don Owen 1962 - cinematographer
- Nobody Waved Good-bye - feature, Don Owen 1964 - editor and cinematographer
- Rivera - documentary, The American Worker series (non-NFB), Morten Parker 1964
- The Hutterites - documentary short, Colin Low 1964 - editor and cinematographer
- The Edge of the Barrens - documentary short, Dalton Muir 1964 - editor
- Legault's Place - documentary short, Suzanne Angel 1965 - cinematographer
- Two Men of Montreal - documentary, Suzanne Angel, Donald Brittain & Don Owen 1965 - cinematographer
- Buster Keaton Rides Again - documentary, 1965 - editor, cinematographer, director
- Memorandum - documentary 1965 - editor, cinematographer and, with Donald Brittain, director
- Sanchez - documentary, The American Worker series (non-NFB), Morten Parker 1965
- Ybarra - documentary, The American Worker series (non-NFB), Morten Parker 1966
- Never a Backward Step - documentary 1966 - with Donald Brittain & Arthur Hammond, director
- The Forest - documentary short, 1966 - editor and director
- The White Ship - documentary short, Hector Lemieux 1966 - editor
- The Long Haul Men - documentary short, Michael Rubbo 1966 - editor
- High Steel - documentary short, Don Owen 1966 - cinematographer
- After Eve - documentary short, Michael J.F. Scott 1967 - editor
- This Land - documentary short, Arthur Hammond 1968 - editor
- Les voitures d'eau (The River Schooners) – feature, Pierre Perrault 1968 – co-editor with Guy L. Coté
- Activator One - documentary 1969 - director
- Of Many People - documentary short, Stanley Jackson 1970 - editor and co-producer with Robert Verrall
- Pillar of Wisdom - documentary short, Josef Reeve 1970 - cinematographer
- Kainai - documentary short, Don Owen 1973 - cinematographer
- Circus World - documentary short, Roman Kroitor 1974 - cinematographer
- Have I Ever Lied to You Before? - documentary 1976 - director
- Eaton’s Centre - televisit 1977 - producer and director
- A Pinto for the Prince - documentary short 1979 - with Colin Low, director
- Meet the Martins - documentary short, William Pettigrew 1979 - co-producer with William Pettigrew
- Viking Visitors to North America - documentary short, Tony Ianzelo & Anthony Kent 1979 - producer
- Canada Vignettes: The Music Makers, Malca Gillson 1979 - producer
- Atmos - documentary short, Colin Low 1980 - co-producer with Michael Sullivan
- Home Feeling: Struggle for a Community - documentary, Jennifer Hodge de Silva & Roger McTair 1983 - executive producer
- Prisoners of Debt: Inside the Global Banking Crisis - documentary, Robert Collison & Peter Raymont 1983 - executive producer
- Thanks for the Ride - short film, John Kent Harrison 1983 - executive producer
- Pitchmen - documentary, Barry Greenwald 1985 - executive producer
- Final Offer - documentary, Sturla Gunnarsson & Robert Collison 1985 - executive producer
- Class of Promise - documentary, Barbara Sears 1985 - executive producer
- Dad's House, Mom's House - documentary, Lyn Wright 1985 - executive producer
- The Hospital - short film, Murray Battle 1985 - executive producer
- Left Out - short film, Jim Purdy 1985 - executive producer
- The Umpire - short film, Paul Shapiro 1985 - executive producer
- Where's Pete? - short film, Jim Purdy, 1986 - executive producer
- Mr. Nobody - documentary short, Lyn Wright 1987 - executive producer
- Hayley's Home Movie - short film, Gail Singer 1987 - executive producer
- No Way! Not Me - documentary short, Ariadna Ochrymovych 1987 - executive producer
- For Richer, For Poorer - short film, Ariadna Ochrymovych 1988 - executive producer
- A House Divided: Caregiver Stress and Elder Abuse - documentary short, Lyn Wright 1988 - executive producer
- Peep and the Big Wide World - cartoons, Kaj Pindal 1988 - executive producer
- Imperfect Union: Canadian Labour and the Left, Part 1 - International Background, Canadian Roots - documentary, Arthur Hammond 1989 - executive producer
- Imperfect Union: Canadian Labour and the Left, Part 2 - Born of Hard Times - documentary, Arthur Hammond 1989 - executive producer
- Imperfect Union: Canadian Labour and the Left, Part 3 - Falling Apart and Getting Together - documentary, Arthur Hammond 1989 - executive producer
- Imperfect Union: Canadian Labour and the Left, Part 4 - New Party, Old Problems - documentary, Arthur Hammond 1989 - executive producer
- Media and Society: Advertising and Consumerism - documentary, David Adkin 1989 - producer
- Media and Society: Cultural Sovereignty/Shaping Information - documentary, David Adkin 1989 - producer
- Media and Society: Images of Women - documentary, David Adkin 1989 - producer
- Transplant, the Breath of Life - documentary, Elias Petras 1990 - co-producer with Elias Petras
- Constructing Reality: Exploring Media Issues in Documentary - What Is a Documentary? Ways of Storytelling - documentary, David Adkin 1993 - co-producer with Michael Allder
- Constructing Reality: Exploring Media Issues in Documentary - Shaping Reality - documentary, David Adkin 1993 - co-producer with Michael Allder
- Constructing Reality: Exploring Media Issues in Documentary - The Politics of Truth - documentary, David Adkin 1993 - co-producer with Michael Allder
- Constructing Reality: Exploring Media Issues in Documentary - The Candid Eye? - documentary, David Adkin 1993 - co-producer with Michael Allder
- Constructing Reality: Exploring Media Issues in Documentary - Voices of Experience, Voices for Change Part 1 - documentary, David Adkin 1993 - co-producer with Michael Allder
- Constructing Reality: Exploring Media Issues in Documentary - Voices of Experience, Voices for Change Part 2, The Poetry of Motion - documentary, David Adkin 1993 - co-producer with Michael Allder
- Village of Idiots - animated short film, Eugene Fedorenko & Rose Newlove 1999 - executive producer

== Awards ==
The Hutterites (1964)

- Montreal International Film Festival, Montreal: First Prize, Shorts, 1964
- Columbus International Film & Animation Festival, Columbus, Ohio: Chris Award, First Prize, Religion, 1964
- Yorkton Film Festival, Yorkton, Saskatchewan: Golden Sheaf Award, First Prize, Human Relations, 1964
- Melbourne Film Festival, Melbourne: Honorable Mention, 1964
- American Film and Video Festival, New York: Blue Ribbon, Doctrinal and Denominational Topics, 1965
- Landers Associates Awards, Los Angeles: Award of Merit
- Festival dei Popoli/International Film Festival on Social Documentary, Florence, Italy: Second Prize, 1965
- Canadian Cinematography Awards, Toronto - Best Black and White Cinematography, 1964
- 16th Canadian Film Awards, Toronto - Special Award for Black and White Cinematography, 1964

Buster Keaton Rides Again (1965)

- 18th Canadian Film Awards, Montreal: Best Film, General Information, 1966
- Montreal International Film Festival, Montreal: First Prize, Medium-Length Films, 1966
- Golden Gate International Film Festival, San Francisco: Silver Trophy, Documentary, 1966
- International Exhibition of the Documentary Film, Venice: CIDALC Special Prize, 1966
- American Film and Video Festival, New York: First Prize, Music, Literature & Films, 1967
- Melbourne Film Festival, Melbourne: Special Prize for Best Biographical Documentary, 1967
- MIFED (Mercato internazionale del film e del documentario) International Contest of Public Relations, Milan: Gold Medal 1968
- 20th British Academy Film Awards, London: Nominee: BAFTA Award for Best Documentary, 1967

Memorandum (1965)

- Venice Film Festival, Venice: First Prize, Lion of St. Mark, 1966
- Golden Gate International Film Festival, San Francisco: First Prize, Essay, 1966
- Vancouver International Film Festival, Vancouver: Certificate of Merit, Television Films, 1966
- Montreal International Film Festival, Montreal: Special Mention, Medium-Length Films, 1966

The Forest (1966)

- Yorkton Film Festival, Yorkton, Saskatchewan: Golden Sheaf Award, Best Film, Industry and Agriculture 1967
- Cork International Film Festival, Cork, Ireland: First Prize – Certificate of Merit, Industrial Films, 1966

Never a Backward Step (1966)

- American Film and Video Festival, New York: Blue Ribbon, First Prize, Biography & History, 1968
- 20th Canadian Film Awards, Toronto: Best Documentary Over 30 Minutes, 1968

Thanks for the Ride (1983)

- American Film and Video Festival, New York: Blue Ribbon Award, Human Sexuality, 1985

Dad's House, Mom's House (1985)

- Columbus International Film & Animation Festival, Columbus, Ohio: Chris Award, Bronze Plaque, Health & Medicine, 1960

Final Offer (1985)

- Banff Mountain Film Festival, Banff, Alberta: Grand Prize of the Festival, 1986
- Banff Mountain Film Festival, Banff, Alberta: Rockie Award for Best Political and Social Documentary, 1986
- 7th Genie Awards, Toronto: Best Feature Length Documentary, 1986
- Golden Gate International Film Festival, San Francisco: Special Jury Award, 1986
- Columbus International Film & Animation Festival, Columbus, Ohio: Chris Award, First Prize, Industry & Commerce, 1986
- Chicago International Film Festival, Chicago: Gold Plaque, Social/Political Documentary, 1986
- Prix Italia, International Competition for Radio and Television Productions, Lucca, Italy: Italia Award for Best Documentary, 1986

Left Out (1985)

- ATOM Awards, Melbourne, Australia: Certificate of Commendation, Short Educational Films & Videos, 1988

The Umpire (1985)

- American Film and Video Festival, Chicago: Red Ribbon Award, Children’s Fiction, 1986
- National Educational Media Network Competition, Oakland, California: First Place, Human Relations, 1985

Mr. Nobody (1987)

- American Film and Video Festival, New York: Red Ribbon Award, Special Needs/Elderly, 1988

A House Divided: Caregiver Stress and Elder Abuse (1988)

- American Film and Video Festival, New York: Red Ribbon Award, Special Needs/Elderly, 1990

Peep and the Big Wide World (1988)

- Ottawa International Animation Festival, Ottawa: Second Prize, Children's Animated Productions, Non-Series, 1988
- International Children's Film Festival, Chicago: Honorable Mention, Single Program Video Animation, 1988
- American Film and Video Festival, Chicago: Red Ribbon Award, Original Works for Children/Animation, 1992
- National Educational Media Network Competition, Oakland, California: Bronze Plaque Award, Literary Adaptations, K-2, 1992
- California Children's Media Awards, Los Angeles: Award for Excellence in Children's Video, 1992

Transplant, the Breath of Life (1990)

- International Festival of Red Cross and Health Films, Varna, Bulgaria: First Prize, Gold Medal, Popular Science, Documentary on Health and Ecological Subjects 1991

Village of Idiots (1999)

- CINANIMA International Animated Film Festival, Espinho, Portugal: RTP Internacional Jury Honorable Mention, 1999
- CINANIMA International Animated Film Festival, Espinho, Portugal: Special Jury Award, 1999
- CINANIMA International Animated Film Festival, Espinho, Portugal: Audience Award, 1999
- Vancouver International Film Festival, Vancouver: Best Animated Film, 1999
- Montreal World Film Festival, Montreal: FIPRESCI Award International Federation of Film Critics, 1999
- Montreal World Film Festival, Montreal: Second Prize, Short Films, 1999
- Writers Guild of Canada: Best Script, to John Lazarus, 1999
- Castelli Animati, Genzano di Roma, Italy: Grand Prize, 2000
- Curtas Vila do Conde International Film Festival, Vila do Conde, Portugal: Grand Prize for Animation, 2000
- International Jewish Video Competition of the Judah L. Magnes Museum, Berkeley, California: First Prize, Animation, 2000
- Hiroshima International Animation Festival, Hiroshima, Japan: Renzo Kinoshita Award, 2000
- Palm Springs International Festival of Short Films, Palm Springs, California: Second Place, Animation, 2000
- Animafest Zagreb, Zagreb, Croatia: Second Prize, 2000
- Message to Man International Film Festival, St. Petersburg, Russia – Centaur Award for Best Animation, 2000
- Annecy International Animation Film Festival, Annecy, France: Special Jury Award, 2000
- Brisbane International Film Festival, Brisbane, Australia: Special Jury Award, 2000
- Melbourne International Animation Festival, Melbourne: Award for Best of International Session 6, 2001
- California SUN International Animation Festival, Los Angeles: Silver Star Award for Best Experimental Animation, 2001
- 21st Genie Awards, Toronto – Genie Award for Best Animated Short, 2001
- New York International Children's Film Festival, New York: Grand Prize Audience Award, 2002
