= Stanley Jackson (filmmaker) =

Canadian filmmaker (1914–1981)

- Born: 1914; Winnipeg, Manitoba, Canada
- Died: July 4, 1981 (aged 66–67); Toronto
- Occupations: Director, producer, writer, narrator
- Years active: 1942–1979
- Awards: see below

Stanley Jackson (1914–1981) was a Canadian film director, producer, writer and narrator with the National Film Board of Canada (NFB).

== Biography ==
Jackson began his career as a schoolteacher in Winnipeg, before taking a teaching position in Toronto. There, in 1942, he was hired by NFB producer Stuart Legg to conduct research for the new NFB series Canada Carries On. He wrote and directed the first film he worked on, Battle of the Harvests. At the time, Tom Daly was putting together the NFB's now-famous Unit B; Jackson and Colin Low were its first two members. They were joined by Terence Macartney-Filgate, Robert Verrall, Norman McLaren, Roman Kroitor, Don Owen, Arthur Lipsett, Wolf Koenig and Hugh O'Connor.

Jackson soon distinguished himself as a writer, and as a narrator. He wrote most of his own scripts, and created a characteristic narration style for NFB, becoming known as "the voice of the NFB". Of the 130 films he made, he was the narrator of 82, and Low would call him "irreplaceable" in the field of documentary film commentary. Ironically, Jackson is also credited with helping to break the NFB narration style he helped to create, on Low and producer Tom Daly's 1954 film, Corral:

Gathered around the moviola, the crew watched the film; it was silent, save for the music. "Where's the commentary?" someone asked halfway through. They kept watching. When it was over, Jackson asked them frankly, "What would a commentary do for that?" Low and Daly couldn't help but agree. Corral became the first NFB film without a voiceover track.

Jackson was known as a meticulous filmmaker and, along with Low, as the "conscience" of Unit B; the two men worked together to make sure that no documentary descended into voyeurism. Jackson was also the "peace-keeper" of the unit, holding the team together as others found the personalities of Kroitor and Lipsett difficult to deal with. A bachelor with no relatives, Unit B was Jackson's family—to the point where he paid the school tuition for Kroitor's son for two years. He retired for health reasons in 1971 and died in Toronto in 1981, at age 67.

== Filmography ==
All National Film Board of Canada

- Canada Carries On: Battle of the Harvests - documentary short, 1942 - writer, director
- Canada Carries On: Thought for Food - documentary short, 1943 - writer, director
- Home to the Land - documentary short, 1944 - writer, director
- Hands for the Harvest - documentary short, 1944 - writer, director
- The Plots Thicken - animated short, 1944 - writer, director
- This is Our Land - documentary short, 1945 - writer, producer, director
- Canada Carries On: This is Our Canada - documentary short, 1945 - writer, producer, director
- Condition Improved - documentary short, 1946 - writer, director
- Ukrainian Festival - documentary short, 1947 - writer, co-producer, co-director with John H. Tyo
- Who Will Teach Your Child? - documentary short, 1948 - writer, editor, director
- Canada Carries On: Summer is for Kids - documentary short, 1949 - producer, director
- Canada Carries On: Our Town is the World - short film, 1950 - director
- Feelings of Depression - documentary short, 1950 - writer, director
- Depressive States - documentary short, 1951 - writer, director
- Schizophrenia: Catatonic Type - documentary short, 1951 - writer, director
- Schizophrenia: Hebephrenic Type - documentary short, 1951 - writer, director
- Schizophrenia: Simple Type: Deteriorated - documentary short, 1951 - writer, director
- Paranoid Conditions - documentary short, 1951 - writer, director
- Organic Reaction Type: Senile - documentary short, 1951 - writer, director
- Manic State - documentary short, 1952 - writer, director
- Paul Tomkowicz: Street-Railway Switchman - documentary short, Roman Kroitor 1953 - writer
- Shyness - documentary short, 1953 - writer, director
- The Ballot-o-Maniac - short film, 1953 - writer, director
- One Little Indian - animated puppet film, 1954 - writer, director
- To Serve the Mind - short film, 1955 - writer, director, co-narrator with Tom McBride
- The Pony - short film, Lawrence Cherry 1955 - narrator
- Introducing Canada - documentary short, Tom Daly 1956 - writer
- Profile of a Problem Drinker - short film, Perspective series 1957 - writer, director
- Looking Beyond…Story of a Film Council - documentary short, 1957 - writer, director
- The Quest - short film, 1958 - director
- Stigma -short film, 1958 - writer, director
- Town Planning (The Master Plan) - documentary short, Louis Portugais 1958 - narrator
- Trans Canada Summer - documentary, Ronald Dick 1958 - writer, narrator
- Memory of Summer - documentary short, 1958 - writer, director
- A Foreign Language - documentary short, 1958 - writer, director
- The Days Before Christmas - documentary short, 1958 - co-writer and co-director with Terence Macartney-Filgate and Wolf Koenig
- The Back-Breaking Leaf - documentary short, Terence Macartney-Filgate 1959 - writer, narrator
- The Canadians - documentary short, Terence Macartney-Filgate 1959 - writer, narrator
- Emergency Ward - documentary short, William Greaves 1959 - writer, narrator
- Glenn Gould - On the Record - documentary short, Wolf Koenig & Roman Kroitor 1959 - co-writer, narrator
- Glenn Gould - Off the Record - documentary short, Wolf Koenig & Roman Kroitor 1959 - co-writer, narrator
- Tourist Go Home -short film, 1959 - co-writer and co-director with Ron Weyman
- Roughnecks: The Story of Oil Drillers - documentary short, Guy L. Coté 1960 - narrator
- The Cars in Your Life - documentary short, Terence Macartney-Filgate 1960 - writer, narrator
- Circle of the Sun - documentary short, Colin Low 1960 - co-writer with Colin Low
- Universe - documentary short, Colin Low & Roman Kroitor 1960 - commentary
- The Discovery of Insulin - documentary short, 1961 - director
- Wrestling - documentary short, Michel Brault, Claude Jutra, Marcel Carrière, Claude Fornier 1961 - narrator
- Mathematics at Your Fingertips - documentary short, John Howe 1961 - writer, narrator
- The Days of Whiskey Gap - documentary short, Colin Low 1961 - writer, narrator
- University - documentary, 1961 - director
- The Peep Show - cartoon, Kaj Pindal 1962 - narrator
- My Financial Career - animated short, Gerald Potterton 1962 - writer, narrator
- The Living Machine - documentary, Roman Kroitor 1962 - writer, narrator
- The Origins of Weather - animated documentary short, Joe Koenig 1963 - narrator
- Cornet at Night - short film, 1963 - writer, director
- Children Learn from Filmstrips - documentary short, 1963 - director, narrator
- Paul-Émile Borduas 1905-1960 - documentary short, Jacques Godbout 1963 - co-narrator with Percy Rodriguez
- Trail Ride - documentary short, Ernest Reid 1964 - writer, narrator
- The Transition - documentary short, Mort Ransen 1964 - narrator
- The Hundredth Summer - documentary, Terence Macartney-Filgate 1964 - writer, narrator
- The Moontrap - documentary, Michel Brault, Marcel Carrière and Pierre Perrault 1964 - writer, narrator
- Among Fish - documentary short, 1964, co-director with Mort Ransen & Kenneth McCready
- The Hutterites - documentary short, Colin Low 1964 - writer, narrator
- Above the Horizon - documentary short, Roman Kroitor and Hugh O'Connor 1964, writer, narrator
- Antigonish - documentary short, 1964 - director
- Legault's Place - documentary short, Suzanne Angel 1964 - writer, narrator
- Jet Pilot - documentary short, Joe Koenig 1964 - writer, narrator
- About Flowers - documentary short, René Jodoin 1964 - writer
- A Tree is a Living Thing - documentary short, Vincent Vaitiekunas 1964 - writer, narrator
- Two Men of Montreal - documentary, Suzanne Angel, Donald Brittain & Don Owen 1965 - co-writer with Donald Brittain
- Henry Larsen - documentary short, John Kemeny 1965 - writer, narrator
- War II: Total War - documentary short, William Canning 1965 - writer, narrator
- Instant French - short film, David Bearstow 1965 - writer
- Stefansson: The Arctic Prophet - documentary short, John Kemeny 1965 - narrator
- The Forest - documentary short, John Spotton 1966 - writer
- The Long Haul Men - documentary short, Michael Rubbo 1966 - writer, narrator
- The People at Dipper - documentary short, Richard Gilbert and Jack Ofield 1966 - writer, narrator
- Island Observed - documentary short, Hector Lemieux 1966 - writer
- Paddle to the Sea - documentary short, Bill Mason 1966 - co-producer, writer, narrator
- Helicopter Canada - documentary, Eugene Boyko 1966 - narrator
- Steeltown - documentary, Walford Hewitson 1966 - writer
- After Eve - documentary short, Michael J.F. Scott 1967 - writer, narrator
- The Transportation of Ore Concentrate - documentary short, Eugene Boyko 1967 - writer, narrator
- The Name of the Game is Volleyball - documentary short, Hector Lemieux 1967 - writer, narrator
- Charlie’s Day - short film, Martin Defalco 1967 - narrator
- The Indian Speaks - documentary, Marcel Carrière 1967 - writer, narrator
- They’re Putting Us Off the Map - documentary short, Michael J.F. Scott 1968 - writer, narrator
- Foresters - documentary short, Werner Aellen 1968 - narrator
- Standing Buffalo - documentary short, Joan Henson 1968 - writer
- The World of One in Five - documentary short, James Carney 1969 - writer, narrator
- Pathways to the Sky - documentary short, Hector Lemieux 1969 - writer, narrator
- If He Is Devoured, I Win - experimental film, Rick Raxlen 1969 - co-producer with Tom Daly
- Aqua Rondo - documentary short, Jacques Bensimon 1969 - writer, narrator
- Of Many People - documentary short, 1970 - writer, director
- Introduction to Labrador - documentary short, George C. Stoney and Harvey Best 1970 - writer, narrator
- Tee-Won Short - documentary short (3 parts), Michael J. F. Scott 1970 - producer
- Death of a Legend - documentary, Bill Mason 1970 - writer
- The Conquered Dream - documentary, Michael McKennirey and Richard Robinson 1971 - writer, narrator
- People of the Seal, Part 1: Eskimo Summer - documentary, Michael McKennirey and Richard Robinson 1971 - writer
- People of the Seal, Part 1: Eskimo Winter - documentary, Michael McKennirey and Richard Robinson 1971 - writer
- The Sea - documentary short, Bané Jovanovic 1971 - co-writer with Joseph B. MacInnis
- Here is Canada - documentary short, Tony Ianzelo 1972 - writer, narrator
- Kainai - documentary short, Raoul Fox 1973 - writer
- Child, Part 1: Jamie, Ethan and Marlon: The First Two Months - documentary short, Robert Humble 1973 - writer, narrator
- Child, Part 2: Jamie, Ethan and Keir: 2-14 Months - documentary short, Robert Humble 1973 - writer, narrator
- Mr. Symbol Man - documentary, Bruce Moir & Bob Kingsbury 1974 - writer, narrator
- The New Alchemists - documentary, Dorothy Todd Henaut 1974 - writer, narrator
- Child, Part 3: Debbie and Robert: 12-24 Months - documentary short, Robert Humble 1974 - writer, narrator
- The Boat That Ian Built - documentary short, Andy Thomson 1974 - co-producer with Colin Low
- Freshwater World - documentary short, Giles Walker 1974 - narrator, co-writer
- The Light Fantastik - documentary short, Michel Patenaude and Rupert Glover 1974 - writer, narrator
- Enemy Alien - documentary short, Jeanette Lerman 1975 - narrator, co-writer with Jeanette Lerman
- Jack Rabbit - documentary short, Bill Brind 1975 - writer, narrator
- The Outcome of Income - animated documentary short, Veronika Soul 1975 - writer, narrator
- Have I Ever Lied to You Before? - documentary, John Spotton 1976 - writer, narrator
- A Pinto for the Prince - documentary short 1976 - Colin Low and John Spotton, writer, narrator
- The Great Clean-Up - documentary, James Carney 1976 - writer, narrator
- First Steps - documentary short, Philip Bridgeman and Alec MacLeod 1976 - writer, producer, narrator
- The Vacant Lot - documentary short, Judith Merritt 1977 - co-producer with Donald Brittain
- The 1 CAG Story - documentary short, Douglas Cameron and Andy Thomson 1977 - writer
- Child, Part 4: Kathy and Ian: Three-Year-Olds - documentary short, Robert Humble 1977 - writer, narrator
- Child, Part 5: 4 Years - 6 Years - documentary short, Robert Humble 1978 - writer, narrator
- Flash William - documentary short, Tom Radford 1978 - co-writer, narrator
- The Forests and Vladimir Krajina - documentary short, John Laing and Thomas Burstyn 1978 - writer, narrator
- Canada Vignettes: Helen Law - documentary short, Jennifer Hodge de Silva 1979 - writer
- China Mission: The Chester Ronning Story - documentary, Tom Radford 1979 - co-writer with Tom Radford
- John Law and the Mississippi Bubble - animated short, Richard Condie 1979 - writer, narrator
- Unemployment: Voices from the Line - documentary short, Pierre Lasry 1979 - narrator
- Prairie Album - animated documentary short, Blake James 1979 - writer

== Awards ==
Who Will Teach Your Child? (1948)

- 1st Canadian Film Awards, Ottawa: Best Theatrical Short, 1950
- Scholastic Teacher Magazine Annual Film Awards: Top-Ten List: Best 16mm Information Films of 1949

Canada Carries On: Summer is for Kids (1949)

- 2nd Canadian Film Awards, Ottawa: Honourable Mention, Theatrical Short, 1950

Feelings of Depression (1950)

- 3rd Canadian Film Awards, Ottawa: Genie Award for Best Non-Theatrical Film, 1951

To Serve the Mind (1955)

- Golden Reel International Film Festival, Film Council of America, Chicago: Silver Reel, Health, 1956

The Quest (1958)

- 11th Canadian Film Awards, Toronto: Award of Merit, Theatrical Short, 1959
- HYSPA Healthcare & Sports Exhibition, Bern: Diploma of Merit, 1961

Children Learn from Filmstrips (1963)

- Columbus International Film & Animation Festival, Columbus, Ohio: Chris Award, Adult Education/Teachers, 1963

Cornet at Night (1963)

- American Film and Video Festival, New York: Blue Ribbon, Stories for Children, 1965
