= Transitions (film) =

- Directed by: Colin Low; Tony Ianzelo
- Written by: Colin Low
- Produced by: Mark Zannis; Barrie Howells
- Cinematography: Ernest McNabb
- Edited by: Michael McKennirey
- Music by: Eldon Rathburn
- Animation by: Daniel Langlois
- Production company: National Film Board of Canada
- Release date: 1986
- Running time: 20 minutes
- Country: Canada
- Language: English

Transitions is the first full-colour IMAX 3D film, created for the Canada Pavilion at Expo 86, co-directed by Colin Low and Tony Ianzelo and produced by the National Film Board of Canada. It was built upon We Are Born of Stars created for Expo '85 in Tskuba, Japan, which used anaglyph 3D. The film is also notable for the first use of stereoscopic computer animation.

== Production ==
Canadian National, the main sponsor of the Canada Pavilion, asked the NFB to produce a film about transportation in Canada, in keeping with the fair's theme “Transportation and Communications”.

The film's computer animation sequence was produced by the Centre d'animatique unit of the NFB's French animation studio, credited to Daniel Langlois, shortly before he left the NFB to found Softimage.

== Projection ==
Transitions was projected on a 70-by-50-foot (21 by 15 m) screen at the pavilion's CN IMAX Theatre, to over 1.75 million people, during a six-month run.

== See also ==
- Momentum, a 1992 NFB IMAX HD film for Seville Expo '92, by the same creative team as Transitions
- The Romance of Transportation in Canada, a 1952 NFB animated short about transportation in Canada, also directed by Colin Low
