= Circle of the Sun =

1960 film

- Directed by: Colin Low
- Written by: Colin Low
- Produced by: Tom Daly
- Starring: Pete Standing Alone
- Narrated by: Pete Standing Alone; Stanley Jackson
- Cinematography: John Spotton; Dalton Muir
- Edited by: Tom Daly
- Music by: Eldon Rathburn
- Production company: National Film Board of Canada
- Release date: 1960
- Running time: 30 minutes
- Country: Canada
- Language: English

Circle of the Sun is a 1960 short documentary film on Kainai Nation, or Blood Tribe, of Southern Alberta, which captured their Sun Dance ritual on film for the first time. Tribal leaders, who worried the traditional ceremony might be dying out, had permitted filming as a visual record.

The film was directed by Colin Low, who was from the area. Low's father had been a foreman of the Cochrane Church Ranch in the area, southern Alberta and had known many Blood Tribe people since childhood. Colin Low had first witnessed the Sun Dance in 1953, the year he shot Corral. Footage of the Sun Dance was shot in 1956 and 1957, with the film completed in 1959. The film also included modern aspects of Blood Tribe life by shooting on an oil well on the reserve.

== Pete Standing Alone ==
Circle of the Sun features narration from Pete Standing Alone, a young member of the Blood Tribe who worked on oil rigs. When Low had finished editing in 1959, he played a recorded conversation with Standing Alone for Stanley Jackson. Jackson was so impressed that Standing Alone was flown to the NFB's headquarters in Montreal to work on the narration. Standing Alone's participation in the film ended up being quite extensive, at a time when genuine Aboriginal voices were not often heard on the screen.

In 1982, Low directed the NFB documentary Standing Alone, which was broadcast nationally on the Canadian Broadcasting Corporation. The hour-long film follows 25 years in Standing Alone's life, beginning with his youth as an oil-rig roughneck, rodeo rider and cowboy, and explores his concerns about preserving his tribe's spiritual heritage in the industrial age.

On National Aboriginal Day in 2011, the NFB released the Pete Standing Alone trilogy, which includes Circle of the Sun, Standing Alone and a 2010 film, Round Up. The trilogy documents 50 years in the life of the Kainai Nation, as well as Standing Alone's personal development from a youth to a tribal elder.

== Awards ==
- 14th Canadian Film Awards: Genie Award for Best Film, General Information, 1962
- Yorkton Film Festival, Yorkton, Saskatchewan: Golden Sheaf Award, First Prize, 1962
- Festival of Tourist and Folklore Films, Brussels: Best Film on Folklore, 1962
- La Plata International Children's Film Festival, La Plata, Argentina: Silver Oak Leaf, First Prize, Documentary, 1962
- Electronic, Nuclear and Teleradio Cinematographic Review, Rome: First Prize, Tourist Films, 1962
- SODRE International Festival of Documentary and Experimental Films, Montevideo, Uruguay: Honorable Mention, 1962
- Festival dei Popoli/International Film Festival on Social Documentary, Florence, Italy: Honorable Mention, 1962
- Victoria Film Festival, Victoria, British Columbia: Best Film, 1963
- International Tourism Film Festival, Tarbes, France: Diploma of Honour and Trophy, 1967
