= The Hutterites =

1964 film by Colin Low

- Directed by: Colin Low
- Written by: Stanley Jackson
- Produced by: Tom Daly; Roman Kroitor
- Narrated by: Stanley Jackson
- Cinematography: John Spotton
- Edited by: John Spotton; Jean-Pierre Joutel (sound)
- Production company: National Film Board of Canada
- Distributed by: National Film Board of Canada
- Release date: 1964
- Running time: 28 min.
- Country: Canada
- Language: English

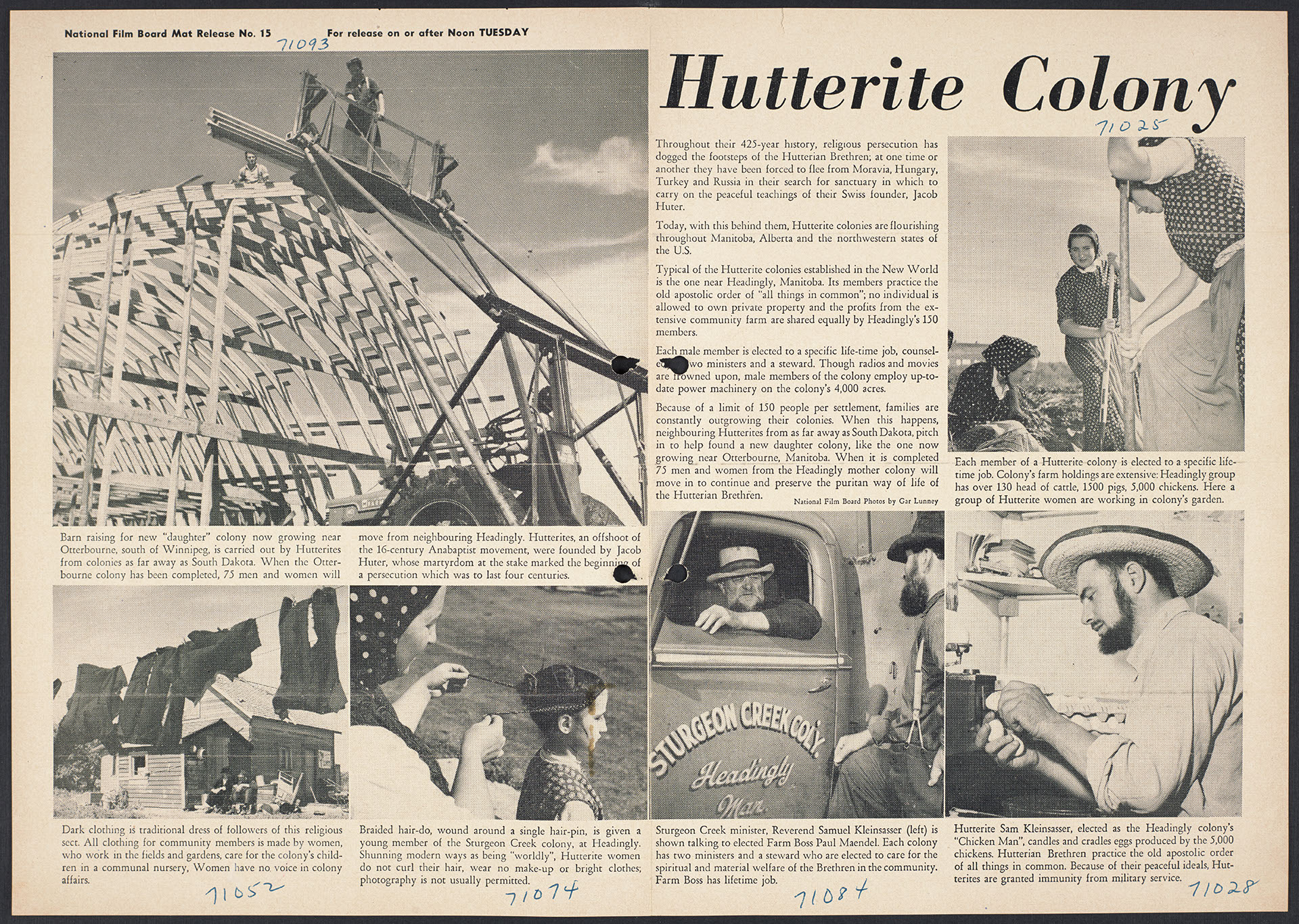
An NFB Photo Release for the film

The Hutterites is a 1964 film directed by Colin Low for the National Film Board of Canada. It was produced to help calm anti-Hutterite tensions in Alberta and remains the only film that fully depicts and explains the sect's way of life.

== Background ==
The Hutterites are an Anabaptist sect founded in Austria in 1528 during the Protestant Reformation. Their leader was Jakob Hutter, who was burned at the stake in 1536. The sect continued on, but was chased out of Moravia, Germany, Romania, Hungary, Russia and Ukraine before arriving in the U.S. in 1874, where they settled in the Dakotas. In 1918, anti-Hutterite sentiment in the U.S. had spread to the point where many were forced to leave.

After obtaining assurances from the Canadian government that they would have permanent freedom of worship and a permanent exemption from military service, 12 Hutterite families moved from South Dakota to Canada, settling in Manitoba, Saskatchewan and Alberta. At the time, the Canadian Pacific Railway owned a great deal of land and was trying to recruit immigrants to farm it; it gave modest acreages to the Hutterite families. This created an immediate backlash and, in 1919, the Canadian government closed the door to further Hutterite emigration.

The Hutterites believe that society can be best preserved in a rural setting and are efficient and successful farmers. In their settlements, all things are held in common. They do not vote or hold public office. They pay taxes and send their children to public school and universities, but do not join community organizations. They do not proselytize and are strict pacifists who will not fight for any reason. In addition to English, they speak their own language, a German dialect.

By 1940, in Alberta, there were 6,500 Hutterites living in 65 colonies, mainly in the Calgary area. But mistrust had grown to the point where, in 1942, the Alberta government enacted the Communal Property Act, which stated that they could not buy land without express government permission, and that any new settlements had to be at least 45 miles from an existing colony.

This did little to quell resentment. Community groups charged that they hurt local businesses by buying their supplies from wholesalers. It was argued that they did not contribute doctors, lawyers, teachers and engineers to society; they angered locals by refusing to participate in school development and rural electrification programs. Claims were made that they had the highest population growth of any demographic, and that they were taking over the area. Some of the most vocal criticism came from the Royal Canadian Legion, which objected to the Hutterite's refusal to fight in World War II.

In 1960, the town of Drumheller felt obliged to respond to all of this, publishing a report stating the Hutterite birth rate was dropping, that Hutterites owned less than 1% of the region's farmland, that they spent the same amount of money as everyone else and that, during World War II, it was Hutterite volunteers who helped keep farms operating when their owners went off to fight. Arguments fell on deaf ears. In 1960, the Warner, Alberta local of the United Farmers of Alberta announced that it was prepared to break the law to prevent a Hutterite colony from becoming established in the area, stating “we have reached the end of our patience. There is seething resentment which can erupt at any time.”

The Hutterite colonies did not defend themselves, and it did not help that they didn't let anyone into their lives—no one went to their colonies. However, Colin Low had grown up with the Hutterites; his family's ranch abutted the West Raley Colony near Cardston. He was able to convince this colony, and a second unidentified colony in northern Alberta, to allow him to make a film about them and, in 1963, he and his crew spent several weeks filming all aspects of Hutterite life. The film is a calm, quiet depiction and explanation of the Hutterite's history, beliefs and lifestyle.

The Alberta government's restriction on the Hutterite purchase of land was lifted in 1972.

== Awards ==
- Montreal International Film Festival, Montreal: First Prize, Shorts, 1964
- Columbus International Film & Animation Festival, Columbus, Ohio: Chris Award, First Prize, Religion, 1964
- Yorkton Film Festival, Yorkton: Golden Sheaf Award, First Prize, Human Relations, 1964
- Melbourne Film Festival, Melbourne: Honorable Mention, 1964
- 17th Canadian Film Awards, Toronto: Best Black and White Photography, to John Spotton, 1964
- American Film and Video Festival, New York: Blue Ribbon, Doctrinal and Denominational Topics, 1965
- Landers Associates Awards, Los Angeles: Award of Merit, 1965
- Festival dei Popoli/International Film Festival on Social Documentary, Florence: Second Prize, 1965
