= The Romance of Transportation in Canada =

- Title frame
- Directed by: Colin Low
- Written by: Guy Glover
- Produced by: Tom Daly
- Narrated by: Guy Glover
- Cinematography: Lyle Enright
- Edited by: Kenneth Heeley-Ray (sound)
- Music by: Eldon Rathburn
- Production company: National Film Board of Canada
- Distributed by: National Film Board of Canada
- Release date: 1952
- Running time: 11 minutes, 20 seconds
- Country: Canada
- Language: English

The Romance of Transportation in Canada is a 1952 animated short film made by the National Film Board of Canada. Part of the postwar Canada Carries On series, it offers a humorous account of the history of transportation in Canada. The film was directed by Colin Low and produced by Tom Daly.

The Romance of Transportation in Canada featured animation by Wolf Koenig and Robert Verrall and was narrated by Guy Glover. Eldon Rathburn composed the film score. It was the first NFB animated film to be nominated abroad, and the first to be nominated for an Academy Award in animation.

== Synopsis ==
Throughout its history, transportation in Canada was fraught with difficulty especially looking at Canada's vast distances and natural obstacles such as forest, mountains and rivers. Eventually these obstacles were met with unique solutions, beginning with Canada's First Nations whose canoes allowed for transport over inland waterways. Early pioneers faced the same problems but with larger bateau, cargo could be hauled over longer distances on water. On land, the use of ox-drawn carts became the means to cross rough terrain until stagecoaches were introduced.

With the advent of steam power, and the construction of the Trans-Canada Railway finally the great distances of Canada were overcome. In the early 20th Century, the internal combustion engine then made the next step forward for modern travel with the proliferation of automobiles, aircraft, and even "flying saucers" to come.

== Production ==
The film was a product of the NFB's Unit B production team. The Romance of Transportation in Canada marked the NFB’s first major foray into industrial animation, influenced not by the auteur style of NFB animation studio founder Norman McLaren, but by the United Productions of America (UPA) style.

== Reception ==
The Romance of Transportation in Canada was produced for television broadcast on CBC Television. Individual films were distributed worldwide by the NFB and were also made available to film libraries operated by university and provincial authorities. A total of 199 films in the Canada Carries On series were produced before the series was canceled in 1959.

Canadian film critic Dean Duncan reviewed The Romance of Transportation in Canada and considered it one of Colin Low's finest works. "Here, the title lettering is really cool, the ox is a great character, the snow sections are beautiful, you might even say authoritative. That overhead prairie shot looks real."

== Awards ==
- 7th British Academy Film Awards, London: BAFTA Special Award, 1954
- 1953 Cannes Film Festival, Cannes: Award for Best Animation, 1953
- 5th Canadian Film Awards, Montreal: Honourable Mention, 1953
- 25th Academy Awards, Los Angeles: Nominee, Best Short Subject, Cartoons, 1953

== See also ==
- Transitions, a 1986 NFB IMAX film in 3D about transportation in Canada, also directed by Colin Low
