= Momentum (1992 film) =

- Directed by: Colin Low; Tony Ianzelo
- Produced by: Mark Zannis; Colin Neale (exec.)
- Cinematography: Ernest McNabb
- Edited by: Michael McKennirey
- Music by: Eldon Rathburn
- Distributed by: National Film Board of Canada
- Release date: 1992
- Running time: 20 min.
- Country: Canada
- Language: none

Momentum was the first film shot and released in the IMAX HD film format, which ran at 48 frames per second, and was also one of the first films to use Ambisonic surround sound. The film was produced for the Canada pavilion at Seville Expo '92 by National Film Board of Canada, by the same creative team that made the 1986 3D IMAX film Transitions for Expo 86. The film takes viewers across Canada, demonstrating the ability of the 48 frame/s process to portray motion on the giant IMAX screen with reduced strobing.
