= City of Gold (1957 film) =

- Directed by: Colin Low; Wolf Koenig
- Written by: Roman Kroitor
- Produced by: Tom Daly
- Narrated by: Pierre Berton
- Cinematography: Colin Low; Wolf Koenig
- Edited by: Tom Daly
- Music by: Eldon Rathburn
- Distributed by: National Film Board of Canada
- Release date: 1957
- Running time: 21 min 40 sec
- Country: Canada
- Language: English
- Budget: $20,771

City of Gold is a 1957 Canadian documentary film by Colin Low and Wolf Koenig, chronicling Dawson City during the Klondike Gold Rush. It made innovative use of archival photos and camera movements to animate still images, while also combining narration and music to bring drama to the whole. Its innovative use of still photography in this manner has been cited by Ken Burns as the source of inspiration for his so-called Ken Burns effect, a type of panning and zooming effect used in video production to animate still images.

The film is narrated by Pierre Berton and produced by the National Film Board of Canada.

== Production ==
The film grew out of an earlier 1952 idea to promote tourism and sport in Yukon. In researching for the film, Low and Koenig found some still photos in an Ottawa archive and tried to improve the panning method Low had employed on his 1955 visual arts documentary, Jolifou Inn. Low then discovered a much larger set of archival images of the Yukon Gold Rush, from photographer Eric A. Hegg's collection at the University of Washington in Seattle. The problem of how to animate the images via camera movement prior to the invention of computer-assisted animation cameras was resolved by Kroitor, who enlisted British mathematician Brian Salt to devise mathematical tables, and developed a device dubbed the 'Kroitorer' that allowed one to take single photos of the archival images as if photographing real-life scenes with a hand-held camera.

== Awards ==
- 1957 Cannes Film Festival, Cannes, France: First Prize, Documentary, 1957
- Cork International Film Festival, Cork, Ireland: First Prize - Statuette of St. Finbarr, General Interest 1957
- Canadian Film Awards, Toronto: Genie Award, Film of the Year 1958
- Canadian Film Awards, Toronto: Genie Award, Award of Merit 1958
- Vancouver International Film Festival, Vancouver: First Prize, Documentary 1958
- Yorkton Film Festival, Yorkton, Saskatchewan: Golden Sheaf Award, Best Film, General 1958
- International Festival of Mountain and Exploration Films, Trento, Italy: Gold Medal 1958
- Chicago Festival of Contemporary Arts, University of Illinois Chicago: Documentary Prize 1958
- International Festival of Films on People and Countries, La Spezia, Italy: Gold Caravelle, 2nd prize 1958
- SODRE International Festival of Documentary and Experimental Films, Montevideo, Uruguay: Honourable Mention 1958
- Robert J. Flaherty Film Awards, City College Institute of Film Techniques: Honourable Mention, 1958
- Ibero-American-Filipino Documentary Film Contest, Bilbao, Spain: First Prize, 1959
- American Film and Video Festival, New York: Blue Ribbon, History & Biography, 1959
- Festival of Experimental and Documentary Films, Santiago, Chile: Honourable Mention 1960
- Festival dei Popoli, Florence, Italy: Gold Medal, 1960
- Columbus International Film & Animation Festival, Columbus, Ohio: Chris Award, First Price 1960
- 30th Academy Awards, Los Angeles: Nominee, Short Subjects, Live Action Subjects, 1958

== See also ==
- Still image film
- A Chairy Tale - Another NFB short nominated alongside City of Gold in the same category
