= Boyce Richardson =

Canadian journalist (1928–2020)

- Born: March 21, 1928; Wyndham, New Zealand
- Died: March 7, 2020 (aged 91); Montreal
- Education: Newbattle Abbey College
- Occupations: writer, journalist, director
- Awards: Order of Canada and below

Boyce Richardson, OC (March 21, 1928 – March 7, 2020) was a journalist, author and filmmaker.

== Biography ==
Richardson was born in Wyndham, New Zealand to Robert and Letitia Richardson, and grew up in Invercargill where, at age 17, he began his career in journalism at the Southland Times and the Southland Daily News. After a brief stint as a reporter in Australia, he went to India to live and work at Nilokheri, a co-operative community north of New Delhi. In 1951, he moved to Britain, where he studied writing under the Scottish poet, Edwin Muir at Newbattle Abbey College. In 1954, Richardson emigrated to Canada, first joining the Winnipeg Free Press then the Montreal Star. From 1960 to 1968 he was the latter newspaper's correspondent in London.

== Filmmaking career ==
Upon his return to Montreal, Richardson became disenchanted with corporate media and, in 1971, embarked on a freelance career. Despite knowing nothing about film-making, he began to work for the National Film Board of Canada (NFB), learning the craft under the mentorship of NFB veterans Tony Ianzelo and Colin Low. His first film, Cree Hunters of Mistassini, which he co-directed with Ianzelo, won the BAFTA Award for Best Documentary. Between 1973 and 2000, he made 38 films for the NFB. He made one other film not associated with the NFB; The Children of Soong Ching Ling, produced by UNICEF and directed by Gary Bush, was nominated for the Academy Award for Best Documentary Short Film.

== Politics and activism ==
In 1950, Richardson married Shirley Norton, a woman of Māori descent and the daughter of a trade union activist. The two were proud socialists and Richardson's entire career was devoted to social justice. Many of his NFB films were about worker rights and corporate abuse, but he was an avid supporter of Canada's aboriginal peoples, in creating understanding, and seeking justice in their struggles against degradation of their lands. In his films and books, he created "a chronicle of the assault upon the last coherent hunting culture in North America, the Cree Indians of Quebec, and their vast primeval homelands". He also did prescient work on anti-globalization in the 1987 award-winning NFB documentary Super-Companies, which explored the role of multinational corporations such as Alcan. When his 1996 article Corporations: How Do We Curb Their Obscene Power? was rejected by a progressive periodical, he posted it to the Internet, to worldwide interest. That sparked the creation of Boyce's Paper, a series of regular articles which we would now call a 'blog'.

In 2002, in recognition of his use of "creativity to draw public attention to social issues and engender compassion through mutual understanding", Richardson was invested as a Member of the Order of Canada.

== Personal life and death ==
Richardson's marriage to Shirley, a poet, lasted 56 years and produced four children. She died in 2012. Richardson died of cancer at Montreal's Jewish General Hospital, on March 7, 2020.

== Filmography ==
(For the National Film Board of Canada

- Cree Hunters of Mistassini - documentary 1974 - writer and, with Tony Ianzelo, director
- Our Land is Our Life - documentary 1974 - writer and, with Tony Ianzelo, director
- Niagara for Sale - documentary, William Canning 1975 - writer
- Some People Have to Suffer - documentary, Christopher Pinney 1976 - writer
- Some Call it Progress - documentary short, Tina Viljoen 1978 - writer
- Welcome to Smiths Falls - documentary, William Canning 1978 - writer
- Anthony Mazzocchi Talks About Chemicals and the Workers - documentary short 1978 - writer, director
- Dr. Epstein Talks About Chemicals in the Workplace - documentary short 1978 - writer, director
- Dr. Epstein Talks About Distortion of Information - documentary short 1978 - writer, director
- Dr. Epstein Talks About the Chemical Explosion - documentary short 1978 - writer, director
- Dr. Selikoff Talks About the Latency Period - documentary short 1978 - writer, director
- Homer Séguin Talks About Radiation at Elliot Lake - documentary short 1978 - writer, director
- Our Health is Not for Sale - documentary short 1978 - writer and, with David Newman, director
- Who Will I Sentence Now? - documentary short 1978 - writer and, with David Newman, director
- Two Union Leaders Talk About Workers and Health - documentary short 1978 - writer, director
- Robert Sass: Workers in Saskatchewan - documentary short 1978 - writer, director
- Coke Ovens: A High Risk Job - documentary short 1978 - writer, director
- Georges Dionne, un mineur de l'amiante - documentary short 1978 - writer, director
- Two Dreams of a Nation: The Fortin Family of Quebec and Alberta - documentary short 1980 - writer and, with John Dyer, director
- China: A Land Transformed - documentary short 1980 - writer and, with Tony Ianzelo, director
- North China Commune - documentary 1980 - writer and, with Tony Ianzelo, director
- North China Factory - documentary 1980 - writer and, with Tony Ianzelo, director
- Wuxing People’s Commune - documentary 1980 - writer and, with Tony Ianzelo, director
- Under New Management - documentary short, Tina Viljoen 1981 - writer
- The Politics of Persuasion - documentary short, Martin Defalco 1982 - writer
- Who Wants Unions - documentary short, Laszlo Barna & Laura Alper 1982 - writer
- The Children of Soong Ching Ling - documentary short, non-NFB, Gary Bush 1984 - writer
- From Ashes to Forest - documentary, Tony Ianzelo 1984 - writer
- For Future Generations - documentary 1985 - writer, director
- The Great Buffalo Saga - documentary 1985 - writer and, with Michael McKennirey, director
- Feeding and Clothing China's Millions - documentary short, Dennis Sawyer 1986 - writer
- School in the Bush - documentary short, Dennis Sawyer 1986 - writer
- Super-Companies - documentary 1987 - writer and director
- A Struggle for Shelter - documentary short, Robert Fortier 1987 - writer
- Blockade: Algonquins Defend the Forest - documentary short 1990 - writer, director
- Flooding Job’s Garden - documentary 1991 - writer, director
- Louisbourg Under Siege - documentary, Albert Kish 1997 - writer
- Moving Pictures - documentary, Colin Low 2000 - writer

== Awards ==
Cree Hunters of Mistassini (1974)

- BAFTA (British Academy Film Awards), London – BAFTA Award for Best Documentary (Robert Flaherty Award), 1975
- 26th Canadian Film Awards, Niagara-on-the-Lake, ON - Genie Award for Best Documentary, 1975
- Melbourne Film Festival – Silver Boomerang, Best Film Made for TV, 1975

Who Will I Sentence Now? (1978)

- World Congress of Rehabilitation International Film Festival, Winnipeg - Second Prize - Prevention/General, 1980

The Great Buffalo Saga (1985)

- International Wildlife Film Festival, Missoula, Montana - Merit Award - Historical Documentary, 1985

Super-Companies (1987)

- National Educational Media Network Competition, Oakland, California – Golden Apple Award, 1990
- American Film and Video Festival, Chicago - Red Ribbon Award - International Issues, 1989

== Bibliography ==
- The Future of Canadian Cities (1972)
- James Bay: The Plot to Drown the North Woods (1972)
- Strangers Devour the Land (1974)
- Drumbeat: Anger and Renewal in Indian Country (1989)
- Time to Change: Canada's Place in a World in Crisis (1990)
- People of Terra Nullius: Betrayal and Rebirth in Aboriginal Canada (1994)
- Memoirs of a Media Maverick (2004)
