= Donald MacRae (astronomer) =

Canadian astronomer

Donald Alexander MacRae (February 19, 1916 – December 6, 2006) was a Canadian astronomer.

Born in Halifax, Nova Scotia, he was the Chair of the Department of Astronomy (now Astronomy and Astrophysics) at the University of Toronto and Director of the David Dunlap Observatory from 1965 to 1978. He was one of a few Canadians who were early Ph.D. graduates in Astronomy from Harvard (1943), where he enrolled after graduating from the University of Toronto in 1937.

He appeared in the Academy Award-nominated NFB documentary Universe (1960) as the astronomer.

He introduced radio astronomy to Toronto, constructing a radio telescope. It was small and so worked at higher frequencies than previous radio telescopes. He saw a strong signal, but failed to publish.

He died December 6, 2006, aged 90, shortly after his wife, Margaret Malcolm.
