= 14th Canadian Film Awards =

Canadian film awards ceremony

- Date: May 26, 1962
- Location: King Edward Hotel, Toronto, Ontario
- Hosted by: Andrew Stewart

The 14th Canadian Film Awards were held on May 26, 1962 to honour achievements in Canadian film. The ceremony was hosted by Andrew Stewart, Chairman of the Board of Broadcast Governors.

For this year's awards, there were 137 entries from 39 producers, with the greatest increase in the Training and Instruction category. The roster of 55 judges in Toronto, Montreal and Ottawa was maintained. Also ongoing was the stream of memos and letters to the CFA suggesting that it change its categories, judging criteria and, most significantly, its position that films not be judged on their quality, but on whether or not they achieved their stated purpose. CFA management discussed all suggestions but maintained its position.

== Winners ==
- Film of the Year: Not awarded
- Feature Film: No entries submitted
- Theatrical Short: Morning on the Lièvre — National Film Board of Canada, David Bairstow producer and director
- TV Information: William Lyon Mackenzie: A Friend to His Country — National Film Board of Canada, Julian Biggs producer and director
- TV Entertainment: Word Game — Canadian Broadcasting Corporation, Philip Keatley producer
- Films for Children: Dance Squared — National Film Board of Canada, Frank Spiller producer, René Jodoin director
- Travel and Recreation: Glooscap Country — Nova Scotia Information Service, Margaret Perry producer and director
- General Information: Circle of the Sun — National Film Board of Canada, Tom Daly producer, Colin Low director
- Public Relations: Campus on the Move — Crawley Films, Peter Cock producer and director

Abitibi — Crawley Films, F. R. Crawley producer, René Bonnière director

- Sales Promotion: Project Sentinel — Crawley Films, James Turpie producer and director
- Training and Instruction: You Can Go a Long Way — Meridian Films, Donald Wilder and Ralph Foster producers, Donald Wilder director
- Filmed Commercial, Company or Product: Molson's "Fishing" — Omega Productions, Henri Michaud producer
- Filmed Commercial, Public Service: Pot-pourri — National Film Board of Canada — Colin Low and Victor Jobin producers, Jeff Hale, Austin Campbell, Derek Lamb, Kaj Pindal, Grant Munro, Cameron Guess and Rhoda Leyer directors
- Amateur: Au temps des ombres blanches — Claude Savard director

Certificate of Merit: The Boy Next Door — Leonard John Getgood producer and director
Certificate of Merit: With a Grain of Salt — Peter Gerretsen director
Certificate of Merit: The Castle — Ernest Frederick Attridge director
Certificate of Merit: Boom — Gordon Kuskey director

- Special Award

O. J. Silverthorne, Chairman Ontario Board of Censors - "for his generous interest in the problems of filmmakers, film users and film viewers, and his helpfulness to the Canadian Film Awards and to the film society movement."
