= For Better or For Worse (1975 film) =

- French: Pour le meilleur et pour le pire
- Directed by: Claude Jutra
- Written by: Claude Jutra
- Produced by: Pierre Lamy
- Starring: Claude Jutra; Monique Miller
- Cinematography: Alain Dostie
- Edited by: Pascale Laverrière
- Production company: Les Productions Carle-Lamy
- Distributed by: Cinépix Film Properties
- Release date: 1975
- Running time: 117 minutes
- Country: Canada
- Language: French

For Better or For Worse (French: Pour le meilleur et pour le pire) is a Canadian comedy film, directed by Claude Jutra and released in 1975. The film centres on a day in the life of Bernard (Jutra) and Hélène (Monique Miller), a married couple in middle age whose relationship has grown stale, but who reach a renewed understanding and appreciation of each other after a fight brought on by Bernard's mistaken belief that Hélène is having an affair.

Its cast also includes Monique Mercure, Paul Savoie, Pierre Dufresne and Roger Garand.

The film was screened out of competition at the 1975 Cannes Film Festival. It had its Canadian premiere in September at the Stratford Film Festival, before opening commercially in October.

== Reception ==
The film was seen by 188,579 people in France.

== Works cited ==
- Marshall, Bill (2001). Quebec National Cinema. McGill–Queen's University Press. ISBN 0-7735-2103-8.
