= Cree Hunters of Mistassini =

1974 film by Tony Ianzelo and Boyce Richardson

- Directed by: Boyce Richardson; Tony Ianzelo
- Written by: Boyce Richardson
- Produced by: Colin Low; Len Chatwin (exec.)
- Narrated by: Boyce Richardson
- Cinematography: Tony Ianzelo
- Edited by: Ginny Stikeman; John Knight (sound)
- Production company: National Film Board of Canada
- Release date: 1974
- Running time: 57 min 53 s
- Country: Canada
- Language: English
- Budget: $95,602

Cree Hunters of Mistassini is a 1974 documentary film produced by the National Film Board of Canada and co-directed by Boyce Richardson and Tony Ianzelo. It chronicles a group of three Cree families from the Mistassini region of Quebec as they set up a winter hunting camp near James Bay and Ungava Bay. The film explores the beliefs and the ecological principles of the Cree people.

Richardson had previously written a series of articles for the Montreal Star on Native rights and the environmental damage done by development on their land. He traveled to Mistassini to speak with Cree friends, pledging that their film would allow Native people to tell their own stories, and filming went ahead with three hunting families in the bush, over five months from 1972 to 1973.

== Awards ==
- BAFTA (British Academy Film Awards), London: BAFTA Award for Best Documentary (Robert Flaherty Award), 1975
- Canadian Film Awards, Niagara-on-the-Lake, ON: Genie Award for Best Documentary, 1975
- Melbourne Film Festival: Silver Boomerang, Best film made specifically for TV, 1975
