= Stratford Film Festival =

The Stratford Film Festival was an annual film festival in Stratford, Ontario, Canada, which was staged from 1956 to 1961 and from 1971 to 1975. One of the first film festivals in North America ever to present international films, it was the preeminent film festival in the Southern Ontario region until the launch of the Festival of Festivals in 1976 resulted in a loss of arts funding and audience support that led the Stratford Film Festival to permanently cease operations that same year.

== Origins ==
The festival was launched in 1956 under the direction of Tom Patterson, screening films in the Stratford Shakespeare Festival's Avon Theatre.

The second festival, held in 1957, grew from the first year's one week of films screened only in the afternoon to a two-week program of films screened both days and evenings, and included the films Oedipus Rex, City of Gold, The Naked Eye, On the Bowery, Pacific Destiny, French Cancan, Girl in Black, The Girl and the Oak, Back of the Beyond, The Devil's General, Trnka's Puppets and Hill 24 Doesn't Answer.

Films scheduled for 1960 included Hiroshima mon amour, The World of Apu, The Hidden Fortress, The Savage Eye, and Sons and Lovers.

In its initial form, the festival ran annually until 1961, when it was suspended because the increasingly decrepit Avon Theatre was no longer a suitable venue for the festival, but no other replacement venue was available at the time.

== Revival ==
After the Avon Theatre was renovated, the festival was relaunched in 1969 by Gerald Pratley of the Ontario Film Institute, and staged its first revived iteration in 1971. Films screened at the 1971 festival included Mon oncle Antoine, King Lear, Tomorrow My Love, Playtime, Derby, Doctor Glas, The Confrontation, A Little Fellow from Gambo, Millhouse, Three to Go, Deep End, Punishment Park, Lola Montès, Medea, W.R.: Mysteries of the Organism and Bless the Beasts and Children.

The 1971 festival was successful, and it was announced that it would be scheduled again in 1972; however, the 1972 festival was marred by the Ontario Censor Board's refusal to clear the film Sweet Sweetback's Baadasssss Song, as well as the Liquor Control Board of Ontario's refusal to grant the theatre a liquor license for the festival.

The final edition of the festival was staged in 1975. Films screened that year included Visit to a Chief's Son, Between Wars, Royal Flash, Akenfield, Cats' Play, Lions for Breakfast, F for Fake, The Moon and the Sledgehammer, A Private Enterprise, Nirmalyam, Impossible Object, The Men, For Better or For Worse (Pour le meilleur et pour le pire) and Eliza's Horoscope, as well as a retrospective of the films of Harold Lloyd.

With the launch of the Festival of Festivals in 1976, the Stratford Film Festival's funding from government arts agencies was significantly cut back. In tandem with the expected decline in attendance given Stratford's proximity to Toronto, organizers decided to cancel the planned 1976 festival.
