= 7th British Academy Film Awards =

1954 film awards ceremony

- Date: 1954

Highlights
- Best Film: Jeux Interdits
- Best British Film: Genevieve
- Most awards: Julius Caesar (2)
- Most nominations: Roman Holiday (4)

The 7th British Academy Film Awards, given by the British Academy of Film and Television Arts in 1954, honoured the best films of 1953.

== Winners and nominees ==
=== Best Film ===
Jeux Interdits

- The Bad and the Beautiful
- Come Back, Little Sheba
- The Cruel Sea
- Due soldi di speranza
- From Here to Eternity
- Genevieve
- The Heart of the Matter
- Julius Caesar
- The Kidnappers
- Lili
- The Medium
- Mogambo
- Moulin Rouge
- Nous sommes tous des assassins
- Le Petit monde de Don Camillo
- Roman Holiday
- Shane
- The Sun Shines Bright

=== Best Foreign Actor ===
Marlon Brando in Julius Caesar

- Spencer Tracy in The Actress
- Van Heflin in Shane
- Eddie Albert in Roman Holiday
- Gregory Peck in Roman Holiday
- Claude Laydu in Journal d'un cure de campagne
- Marcel Mouloudji in Nous sommes tous des assassins

=== Best British Actor ===
John Gielgud in Julius Caesar

- Jack Hawkins in The Cruel Sea
- Kenneth More in Genevieve
- Trevor Howard in The Heart of the Matter
- Duncan Macrae in The Kidnappers

=== Best British Actress ===
Audrey Hepburn in Roman Holiday

- Celia Johnson in The Captain's Paradise

=== Best Foreign Actress ===
Leslie Caron in Lili

- Shirley Booth in Come Back, Little Sheba
- Maria Schell in The Heart of the Matter
- Marie Powers in The Medium

=== Best Documentary ===
The Conquest of Everest

- Teeth of the Wind
- Life in the Arctic
- Water Birds
- World without End
- White Mane
- Elizabeth is Queen
- Pictures of the Middle Ages
- Kumak, the Sleepy Hunter
- Mille Miglia
- Operation Hurricane
- A Queen Is Crowned

=== Best British Film ===
Genevieve

- The Cruel Sea
- The Heart of the Matter
- The Kidnappers
- Moulin Rouge

=== Most Promising Newcomer To Film ===
Norman Wisdom in Trouble in Store

=== United Nations Award ===
World Without End

=== Special Award ===
The Romance of Transportation in Canada

- The Figurehead
- Full Circle
- Johnny on the Run
- Little Boy Blew
- The Dog and the Diamonds
- The Pleasure Garden
- The Moving Spirit
