= Cork International Film Festival =

Annual festival in Ireland

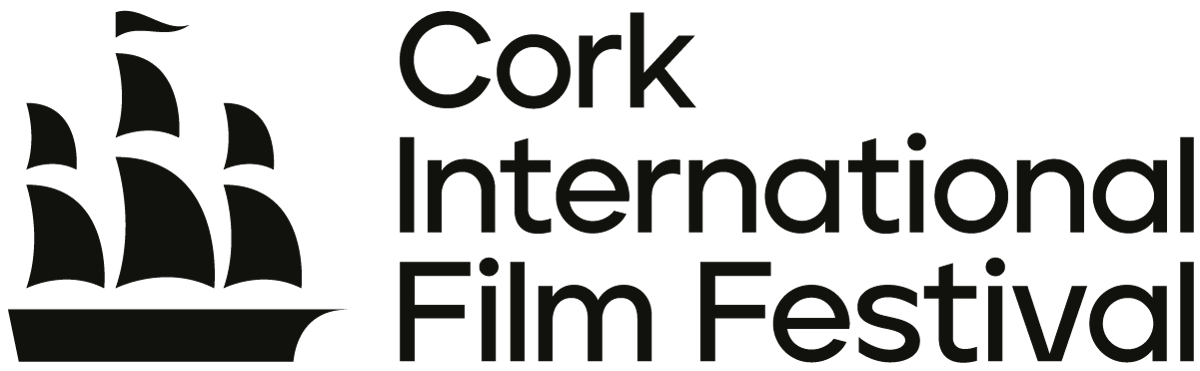
- Location: Cork, Ireland
- Founded: 1956
- Founded by: Dermot Breen
- Most recent: 2025
- Festival date: November
- Website: corkfilmfest.org

Cork International Film Festival (CIFF), also known the Cork Film Festival (Irish: Féile Scannán Chorcaí), is a film festival held annually in Cork City, Ireland. It was established in 1956 as part of An Tóstal, and is Ireland's oldest and largest film festival. It is typically held in November.

For the period 2007 to 2012, the festival was known (for sponsorship reasons) as the Corona Cork Film Festival.

The festival programme is a mix of big budget pictures, world cinema, independent films, documentaries and short films. While international films are also shown at the event, the festival organisers describe it as a "showcase for Irish film production".

A collection of ephemera, relating to the Irish Film Society (IFS) and the Cork International Film Festival, is held in the library of University College Cork. This collection, known as the Dr. Joan Byrne Collection, was donated to the library in 2019.

Three of CIFF's 14 filmmaker awards are qualifying for the Academy Awards.
