= Wolf Koenig =

Canadian filmmaker (1927–2014)

- Born: October 17, 1927; Dresden, Germany
- Died: June 26, 2014 (aged 86); Toronto, Ontario, Canada
- Occupations: Film director, cinematographer, film producer, animator
- Years active: 1951 – 1996

Wolf Koenig (October 17, 1927 – June 26, 2014) was a Canadian film director, producer, animator, cinematographer, and a pioneer in Direct Cinema at the National Film Board of Canada.

== Early life ==
Born in Dresden, Germany, Koenig emigrated to Canada with his family in 1937, when they fled Nazi Germany. They settled in 145-acre (0.59 km^{2}) farm along the Grand River, outside what is now known as Cambridge, Ontario. In 1948, a local representative for the Canadian department of agriculture needed the family's tractor to demonstrate a new tree-planting machine. As the young Koenig pulled the machine across a field, he noticed a small film crew from the NFB's former agricultural film unit, recording the demonstration. After filming was complete, he approached the men, who included director Raymond Garceau, and told them he loved films, especially animation, and hoped to work in filmmaking. They suggested he send in a job application and approximately six weeks later he received a letter offering him the position of a junior splicer for $100 per month.

His younger brother Joe Koenig was also a filmmaker.

== NFB career ==
Koenig quickly established himself as a multi-talented artist, filming Norman McLaren's Neighbours (1952), animating Colin Low's The Romance of Transportation in Canada (1953) and serving as cinematographer on Low's Corral (1954). Koenig co-directed several historically significant NFB documentaries during, including City of Gold (with Low, 1957), The Days Before Christmas (1958), Lonely Boy (with Kroitor, 1962) and Stravinsky (1965). Along with Terence Macartney-Filgate, Roman Kroitor and Tom Daly, he was also one of the principal contributors to the NFB's Candid Eye series, which was influential in the development of direct cinema.

Koenig made major contributions to a range of notable projects. He was also the cinematographer for Arthur Lipsett's Experimental Film (1963) and N-Zone (1970), both admired by George Lucas.

Koenig served as executive producer of the NFB's English animation unit from 1962 to 1967 and again from 1972 to 1975. His credits as an animation producer included the Academy Award nominees The Drag (1966), What on Earth! (1966) and The House That Jack Built (1967). Koenig also produced Alanis Obomsawin's documentary Kanehsatake: 270 Years of Resistance, named Best Canadian Feature Film at the 1993 Festival of Festivals (now Toronto International Film Festival).

== Legacy ==
Koenig retired from the NFB in 1995 to Westport, Ontario, where he made furniture and remained sporadically active in film.

He received numerous honours awards during his career, including a 1984 Genie Award for Best Theatrical Short as producer of Ted Baryluk's Grocery and six Canadian Film Awards: Film of the Year and Best Arts and Experimental Film for City of Gold, Film of the Year and Best General Information Film for Lonely Boy, Best TV Information Film for Stravinsky and Best Documentary Short Film for The Hottest Show on Earth (1977).

Koenig died June 26, 2014, in Toronto at the age of 86.
