= Columbus International Film & Animation Festival =

Annual film festival in Ohio, U.S.

Coordinates: 39°57′53″N 82°59′24″W

Columbus International Film + Animation Festival (CIF+AF)
- Logo of 60th Annual Festival (2012)
- Location: Columbus, Ohio, United States
- Founded: 1952
- Awards: Chris Awards
- Language: International
- Website: https://www.columbusfilm.org

The Columbus International Film + Animation Festival is an annual film festival in Columbus, Ohio, United States, which is designed to encourage and promote the use of film and video in all forms of education and communication.

Established in 1952, the Columbus International Film & Video Festival is one of the oldest film festivals in the United States and claims to be "the longest continuously running film festival in North America." In the beginning, the festival honored industrial, educational, health, travel, religious, and other forms of 16 mm films. As it evolved, it became a showcase for world-class independent films and videos of all types.

The present organization has been known as the Columbus International Film + Animation Festival since 2018. As a competitive festival, it was formally known as 'The Chris Awards'. The Festival is supported by a number of sponsors, including the Ohio Arts Council and the Columbus College of Art & Design.

The Columbus Film Festival has existed since 1952, but was preceded by the foundation of the Columbus Film Council.

A number of awards are presented for each of the following categories:

- The Arts
- Animation
- Basement Film
- Broadcast Journalism
- Education & Information
- Narrative
- The Humanities
- Mental Health +Physical Health
- Music Videos
- Experimental Shorts
- Religion + Spirituality
- Science + Technology
- Social Issues
- Student Competition
