= Eldon Rathburn =

Canadian film composer (1916–2008)

Eldon Davis Rathburn CM (21 April 1916 – 31 August 2008) was a Canadian film composer who scored over 250 films during his thirty-year tenure as a staff composer at the National Film Board of Canada. Known as "the dean of Canadian film composers", Rathburn composed music for documentaries, short films, as well as such feature films as Drylanders (1963), Nobody Waved Good-bye (1964), Waiting for Caroline (1969), Cold Journey (1975), and Who Has Seen the Wind (1977). Rathburn was the subject of a 1995 NFB documentary by Louis Hone titled Eldon Rathburn: They Shoot... He Scores.

== Early life and education ==
Rathburn was born in the community of Queenstown, in Queens County, New Brunswick, Canada. As a child he learned to play the piano. Rathburn attended Saint John High School, and received a Licentiate of Music from McGill University in 1937. The following year, he won the Canadian Performing Rights Society Scholarship Competition, and began performing on the piano for local dance bands and radio broadcasts, including with Don Messer. In 1945 he received a Young Artist Award for composition from the Los Angeles Philharmonic Orchestra. His winning composition, "Symphonette," was performed by the L.A. Philharmonic under the baton of Alfred Wallenstein on 23 March 1945. In L.A. he studied with Arnold Schoenberg, who had chaired the Young Artist Award adjudication committee. From 1938–39, he studied at the Toronto Conservatory of Music with Healey Willan (composition), Reginald Godden (piano), Charles Peaker (organ), and Leo Smith (harmony).

== Career ==
Rathburn began working at the National Film Board in 1947. Among the 250 films he scored was the 1977 adaptation of W.O. Mitchell's Who Has Seen the Wind. He also provided the music for the NFB's Labyrinth installation at Expo 67. He composed music for a number of early IMAX films.

After his retirement from the NFB in 1976, Rathburn continued to compose; his work was featured at the Ottawa Chamber Music Festival.

On April 14, 1999, he was invested as a Member of the Order of Canada. A book on his life and work, authored by James K. Wright, was published by the McGill-Queens Press in 2019.

Rathburn died in Ottawa on 31 August 2008.
