= Transpacific Flight =

- Film poster
- Written by: Bernard Devlin
- Produced by: Bernard Devlin
- Narrated by: Fred Davis
- Cinematography: John Foster
- Production company: National Film Board of Canada
- Distributed by: Canadian Broadcasting Corporation / CBC Television
- Release date: 1953
- Running time: 14 minutes, 31 sec.
- Country: Canada
- Language: English

Transpacific Flight is a 1953 Canadian short documentary film, part of the On The Spot series made specifically for television, produced by the National Film Board of Canada (NFB). The documentary involved an account of a flight across the Pacific Ocean in 1953, based on first-person interviews of the flight crew.

== Synopsis ==
After leaving Sea Island Airport in Vancouver, British Columbia, the Canadian Pacific Air Lines Douglas DC-6 "Empress of Tokyo" airliner will overfly Shemya island in the Aleutians, before continuing to Tokyo, a 4,600 miles non-stop flight. Once airborne, reporter Fred Davis begins by explaining that airliners, like ships at sea, are bound by international regulations that prescribe certain precautions taken to ensure safety. The flight attendants (called stewardess at the time) take care to explain how to use the life preservers that are on board.

Captain Bob McGuiness indicates that "George", the automatic pilot keeps the aircraft flying and allows the air crew to relax during most of the flight. Once reaching the point of no return, the captain, with assistance of the navigator, then plots the route to their final destination through the International Date Line. After 19 hours, the reporter and passengers glimpse the coastline of Japan, and the flight crew prepares everyone on board for a landing at Haneda Airport, Tokyo.

== Cast ==
- Fred Davis, reporter
- Captain Bob McGuiness, Pilot
- Ray Taylor, Navigator
- Delores Cope, Flight attendant
- Connie Sear, Flight Attendant

== Production ==
The On The Spot series segments were produced with a three-person crew: a director, cameraman and on-screen host, usually Fred Davis. The series debuted in 1953, with the 39 episodes, initially 15 minutes in length. For the second season, NFB produced 30-minute episodes.

== Reception ==
The NFB's On the Spot series was the first series made specifically for television by the National Film Board of Canada, which aired on CBC Television for two seasons from 1953 to 1954. Drawing on the experiences of the earlier wartime Canada Carries On and concurrent The World in Action documentary series, each On the Spot episode reported on a different aspect of life in Canada. The episodes were often "editorials", a form of "social documentary". The series was originated by Bernard Devlin. The series underwent a number of challenges with time slots frequently changed, episodes playing as late as 11:45 pm on Monday nights before going to Sundays at 4:30 pm.

The second season aired on Sundays at 10 pm. Cancelled after the 26 episodes of the second season, On the Spot was replaced by the Perspective television series, also produced by the NFB, Perspective featured 30-minute episodes that mixed documentary reports and dramatizations on contemporary Canadian issues.
