= 5th Canadian Film Awards =

Canadian film awards ceremony

- Date: April 30, 1953
- Location: Avenue Theatre, Montreal, Quebec
- Hosted by: Jacques DesBaillets

The 5th Canadian Film Awards were presented on April 30, 1953 to honour achievements in Canadian film.

Sixty films were entered this year and, in keeping with a new policy of rotating ceremony venues, the event was moved to Montreal and the presentations were in English and French. The ceremony was hosted by Quebec radio and television personality Jacques DesBaillets, with special guest Dorothy Lamour.

== Winners ==
- Film of the Year: Tit-Coq — Les Productions Gratien Gélinas, Gratien Gélinas producer, René Delacroix and Gratien Gélinas directors
- Theatrical Feature Length: Tit-Coq — Les Productions Gratien Gélinas, Gratien Gélinas producer, René Delacroix and Gratien Gélinas directors
- Theatrical Short: L'Homme aux oiseaux (The Bird Fancier) — National Film Board of Canada, Guy Glover producer, Bernard Devlin, Jean Palardy directors

Honourable Mention: Îles-de-la-Madeleine (The Wind-Swept Isles) — National Film Board of Canada, Bernard Devlin producer, Jean Palardy director
Honourable Mention: Canine Crimebusters — Associated Screen Studios, Bernard Norrish producer, Gordon Sparling director
Honourable Mention: Citizen Varek — National Film Board of Canada, Nicholas Balla producer, Gordon Burwash director
Honourable Mention: The Roaring Game — Associated Screen Studios, Bernard Norrish producer, Gordon Sparling director

- Non-Theatrical, Open: Angotee: Story of an Eskimo Boy — National Film Board of Canada, Michael Spencer producer, Douglas Wilkinson director
- Special Awards:

L'Âge du castor (Age of the Beaver) — National Film Board of Canada, Tom Daly producer, Colin Low director
Neighbours — National Film Board of Canada, Norman McLaren producer and director
Birds That Eat Flesh — Crawley Films, Quentin Brown producer
A Phantasy — National Film Board of Canada, Norman McLaren producer and director
Honourable Mention: The Son — National Film Board of Canada, Michael Spencer producer, Julian Biggs director
Honourable Mention: The Romance of Transportation in Canada — National Film Board of Canada, Tom Daly producer, Colin Low director
Honourable Mention: The Power Within — Crawley Films, Sally McDonald producer
Honourable Mention: Hot Hickory : Featuring the Skiing of Ernie McCulloch — Ashley and Crippen Ltd., Dan Gibson producer

- Non-Theatrical, Government Sponsored: Shyness — National Film Board of Canada, Tom Daly producer, Stanley Jackson director

Special Award: Jeunesse rurale — Service de ciné-photographie de la province de Québec, Abbé Maurice Proulx producer and director
Honourable Mention: Western Wheat — National Film Board of Canada, Michael Spencer producer, Larry Gosnell director
Honourable Mention: Operation Budworm — Omega Productions, Henri Michaud producer

- Non-Theatrical, Non-Government Sponsored: Immediate Action — Crawley Films, George Gorman producer and director

Special Awards:
High Powder — Associated Screen Studios, Jean-Pierre Sénécal producer
Les Bouts d'chou tissent de la laine — Crawley Films
The King's Man — United Church of Canada, Rev. Anson C. Moorehouse producer
Honourable Mention: Calgary Stampede — Chetwynd Films, Arthur Chetwynd producer
Honourable Mention: Rogerstone — Crawley Films

- Amateur: Not awarded

Honourable Mention: Magic of the Tropics — Dr. S. Copeland
Honourable Mention: Experiment in Animation — Michael A. Riche
