= Radar Station (film) =

- Screen shot of title frame
- Written by: Allen Stark
- Produced by: Allen Stark
- Narrated by: Bill Lee
- Cinematography: Jean Roy
- Edited by: David Mayerovitch
- Production company: National Film Board of Canada
- Distributed by: Canadian Broadcasting Corporation / CBC Television
- Release date: 1953; (Note: Screen image indicates a 1954 production date.)
- Running time: 15 minutes
- Country: Canada
- Language: English

Radar Station is a 1953 Canadian short documentary film produced by the National Film Board of Canada (NFB) as part of the On The Spot series made specifically for television. The documentary involved an account of a visit to a radar station while it is involved in a simulated air attack, and is based on first-person interviews of the staff at the radar station.

== Synopsis ==
In 1953, during the Cold War, RCAF Squadron Leader Bill Lee visits RCAF Station Lac St. Denis in the Pinetree Line of radar stations. Typical of the many Royal Canadian Air Force radar stations that provide air defence over Canada and the United States, the base is involved with identifying and plotting air operations in Canada's Arctic.

S/L John Mahoney, the Senior Controller shows how the standard multi-level operations complex works. The search and height finder equipment and operations are located on the third floor where the Surveillance Controller Supervisor are found. The Senior Controller and other appropriate staff are on the second floor with the Identification Officer and the "cross-tellers", horizontal plotting boards and tote boards on the main floor.

While FtrCops staff are in the canteen, the large search antenna sweeping the skies has detected "unknowns" at 25,000 ft., and the Identification Officer has issued an "alert" through the station PA system. As Airwomen plot the four aircraft on their radar scopes, the Senior Controller issues a command to the Aerospace Control and Warning Squadron (AC&W Sqn), who are constantly on operational readiness. The nearby RCAF base "scrambles" a flight of Canadair Sabre fighter aircraft to intercept the approaching aircraft. The aircraft turn out to be Avro Lancaster bombers that are part of an exercise, showing that the radar station can adequately protect Canada's northern frontiers from the Soviet threat of nuclear attack on North America.

== Cast ==
- Squadron Leader Bill Lee, reporter
- Squadron Leader John Mahoney, Senior Controller

== Production ==
Radar Station relied heavily on military assistance in obtaining footage. The film incorporated footage shot in 1953 at RCAF bases where the radar station operated. The On The Spot series segments were produced with a three-person crew: a director, cameraman and on-screen host, usually Fred Davis, but in this case, RCAF Squadron Leader (later Group Captain) William "Bill" Lee acted as the interviewer and narrator. (Note: Later in 1958, Group Captain Lee was the Director of Public Relations at the RCAF AFHQ.)

The On The Spot series debuted in 1953, with 39 episodes, initially 15 minutes in length. For the second season, NFB produced 30-minute episodes.

== Reception ==
Radar Station was shown on NFB's On the Spot series, the first series made specifically for television by the National Film Board of Canada. The series aired on CBC Television for two seasons from 1953 to 1954. Drawing on the experiences of the earlier wartime Canada Carries On and concurrent The World in Action documentary series, each On the Spot episode reported on a different aspect of life in Canada.

The episodes were often "editorials", a form of "social documentary". The series was originated by Bernard Devlin. The series underwent a number of challenges with time slots frequently changed, episodes playing as late as 11:45 pm on Monday nights before going to Sundays at 4:30 pm. The second season aired on Sundays at 10 pm. Cancelled after the 26 episodes of the second season, On the Spot was replaced by the Perspective television series, also produced by the NFB, Perspective featured 30-minute episodes that mixed documentary reports and dramatizations on contemporary Canadian issues.
