= Jacques DesBaillets =

Canadian journalist (1910–1990)

Jacques Arthur DesBaillets (1910–1990) was a French Canadian radio and television personality. He is considered an important figure in the early development of the two mass media in Quebec.

DeBaillets was one of the original announcers hired by the Canadian Radio Broadcasting Commission in 1933. He later hosted popular CBC Radio shows including "Music Scene" and "Chansonnettes".

== Biography ==
=== Early life ===
DesBaillets was born Jacques Arthur Charles Desbaillets on March 26, 1910, in Montréal, Québec, Canada. He was the son of distinguished civil engineer and Swiss émigré Charles-Jules DesBaillets. His mother, was a French Canadian named Eugénie Lefevre. He was raised in Montreal in the city's most affluent neighbourhood and had a comfortable middle class upbringing.

He attended Lower Canada College as a teenager. He later attended McGill University where he studied engineering.

=== Career ===
After university, DesBaillets was hired by CKVL to co-host a radio show with Jacques Normand, called La parade de la chansonnette française and consisting mainly of pop songs from France.

During the war years (1941–1943), he worked as a foreign correspondent for Radio Canada (French Canada's public broadcaster) based in London where he witnessed first hand the carnage of the Blitz. His assignments included interviewing Canadian forces stationed in England, particularly the French Canadian regiments Les Fusiliers Mont-Royal and the Vandoos, and filing reports on the war for listeners back home. After the war, he met his wife Joan McCort, where they were both working for the CBC (English Canada's public broadcaster) in the International Radio Service.

In 1949, DesBaillets was offered the position of host with CKVL radio station in Montreal by the station's owner Jack Tietolman. The show was broadcast between 7–9 in the morning and was called Bonjours messieurs dames.

His first TV show was called Télé-Metro. This was a TV talk show (inspired by the Jack Paar Show) broadcast live on Canal 10 and consisted of sketch comedy, as well as interviews with celebrities, politicians and famous actors. His main co-stars over the years were Roger Baulu, Jean Coutu, Claude Séguin and Mario Verdon. The show was the first of its kind and was a brilliant success, finally being cancelled after seven years on the air.

DesBaillets also worked as a sports journalist for a few years, acting as host of Radio-Canada's La Ligue du Vieux Poêle (Hot Stove League) program which was broadcast during hockey matches and involved a panel of experts discussing the game.

Later in life he pursued a career as an actor but was only able to find work doing small parts in movies and commercials. He also did work for the National Film Board of Canada, as a narrator of both French and English films.

=== Private life ===
He dabbled in various business ventures during his life often with mixed results, including a wine importing business and he also owned a chain of barbershops in Montreal.

DesBaillets' marriage to Joan McCort lasted until his death in his modest apartment located at 45 rue Brittany on September 4, 1990, caused by heart failure. It produced two sons: Charles and Robert DesBaillets. His grandson is Paul Desbaillets, Canadian restaurateur and media personality. DesBaillets was buried next to his parents in Mount Royal Cemetery in Montreal.

== Filmography ==
=== Movie ===
- 1948 : Habits sans dangers film by David Bairstow : narrator.
- 1952 : Une mesure pour rien film by Bernard Devlin : narrator.
- 1952 : Le chef de la sécurité film by Ronald Weyman: narrator.
- 1956 : Le cas Labrecque film by Bernard Devlin : actor
- 1976 : Let's Talk About Love (Parlez-nous d'amour) short by John Howe : actor
- 1985 : Keeping Track film by Robin Spry : actor

=== Documentary (National Film Board of Canada) ===
- 1940 : Front d'acier documentary by John McDougall : narration.
- 1940 : La femme et la Guerre documentary by Stanley Hawes : narration.
- 1945 : Le vent qui chante documentary by Jean Palardy : narration.
- 1947 : L'École du bâtiment documentary by David Bairstow : narration.
- 1947 : Le Facteur documentary by Morten Parker : narration.
- 1947 : Discutons-le avec le CMP documentary by Fred Lasse and Jacques Bobet : narration.
- 1947 : Jean-Furet-va-t-à la foire documentary by Jack Olsen : narration.
- 1848 : Descentes et virages documentary by Bernard Devlin and Fred Blais : narration.
- 1948 : L'école des champions documentary by Jacques Bobet : narration.
- 1948 : Corps royal d'intendance canadienne documentary by James Beveridge : narration.
- 1948 : L'Art du patinage documentary by Sydney Newman : narration.
- 1949 : Bonjour voisin documentary by Leslie McFarlane : narration.
- 1950 : L'intendance canadienne documentary by Jacques Bobet : narration.
- 1950 : Fête des neiges documentary by Harry Foster : screenwriting.
- 1952 : Le bedeau documentary by Raymond Garceau : narration.
- 1952 : C'est la vie documentary by Ronald Weyman : narration.
- 1953 : Le garde-moteur documentary by Gil LaRoche : narration.
- 1953 : Le cocher documentary by Raymond Garceau : narration.
- 1953 : Un navire et une côte documentary by Robert Anderson : narration.
- 1954 : Les Jeux de l'Empire et du Commonweath britannique documentary by Jack Olsen : narration.

=== Animation ===
- 1949 : Gardons nos dents animation, Children's film by Jim Mackay and Dino Rigolo : narration.
