= Julian Biggs =

Canadian director and producer (1920–1972)

- Born: 24 February 1920; Port Perry, Ontario, Canada
- Died: 4 December 1972 (aged 52); Montreal, Quebec
- Occupations: Director, producer
- Years active: 1950–1972
- Awards: see below

Julian Biggs (1920–1972) was a director and producer with the National Film Board of Canada and its first Director of English Production. Over the course of his 20-year career, he created 146 films, two of which (Herring Hunt (1953) and Paddle to the Sea (1966)) were nominated for Academy Awards. His film 23 Skidoo (1964) received two BAFTA nominations, including the BAFTA United Nations award.

== Biography ==
Biggs was born and raised in Port Perry, in southern Ontario. When World War II broke out in 1939, he joined the Canadian Army and then transferred to the Canadian Navy, where he spent the rest of the war serving on mine-sweepers. He then attended the University of Toronto and, in 1951, was hired as a production assistant by the National Film Board of Canada. He directed his first film, The Son, a year later.

From 1956 to 1958, Biggs produced the Perspective series (paralleled by the similar series in French Passe-partout), which was 35 30-minute dramas with an emphasis on social themes such as alcoholism, drug addiction, adolescence, the elderly, racial problems etc. One such film, Monkey on the Back, directed by Biggs, was a bleak, tragic story of man's unsuccessful struggle to free himself from drug addiction. Similar to Robert Anderson's Drug Addict (1948), which had been banned in the U.S., it was the type of film that caused the NFB to reconsider its role in producing socially relevant films. There was an unwritten policy and priority to shift away from social realism to the 'art' of film.

In his Film Companion, Canadian film historian Peter Morris noted that the series contained elements which later become common in direct cinema. "Perhaps the most original aspect of the films was their method of production: a light, quiet-running Auricon camera mounted on a chest harness, used on location and combined with double-system sound recording using the Sprocketape recorder. This technology sharply reduced production costs and shooting time. The style that resulted is apparent in most of the films, mostly clearly in Joe and Roxy (1957) and Night Children (1956), and clearly anticipates the later application of direct cinema to fiction. The series initially attracted a large audience, but the didactic tone of many of the film and the problems inherent in condensing high-intensity dramas into 30 minutes drove viewers away. The series was cancelled in the spring of 1958. The Candid Eye series was developed at least partially in reaction to the dramatic format of Perspective, an approach the NFB believed had lost touch with the real world."

Between 1959 and 1964, with discussion of Quebec separatism increasing and his own concerns about the future of Canadian Confederation, Biggs produced The History Makers. This was 17 short films about the political figures, Anglophone and Francophone, who founded and organized the country.

In 1966, the filmmakers' union, Syndicat général du cinéma et de la télévision (SGCT), requested greater representation and freedom from bureaucratic interference. NFB Commissioner Guy Roberge responded by creating the positions of Director of English Production, and Director of French Production, appointing Biggs and Marcel Martin, respectively, to the posts.

In 1968, Robin Spry directed Flowers on a One-Way Street, a film about the hippie revolution, 'people vs power', and a youth movement to close Toronto's Yorkville Avenue to traffic. It included a sit-in on the steps of Toronto City Hall and a tumultuous city council meeting, and was followed by an outcry against the NFB, in which police and the media accused filmmakers of organizing the protest and deliberately stoking anti-authority sentiment. Biggs pulled the film. Spry, producer Joe Koenig and the SGCT appealed to NFB Commissioner Hugo McPherson, who over-ruled Biggs. Biggs resigned as Director of English Production.

Biggs returned to directing, making the 1970 documentary A Little Fellow from Gambo: The Joey Smallwood Story, which won three 22nd Canadian Film Awards, including Best Director.

The latter would be his last film; he began to experience health issues and, in 1972, died at his home in Montreal, at age 52. He was survived by his wife Muriel and their four children.

== Filmography ==
Directory:

- The Oyster Man - documentary short, 1951 - co-director with Jean Palardy
- The Son - short film, 1952 - writer, director
- With the Canadians in Korea - documentary short, 1952 - writer, director
- Eye Witness No. 57: Light Plane Armada, Canada's Vegetable Garden, 1953 - co-director with Grant McLean
- Herring Hunt - documentary short, 1953 - director
- Let's Talk About Films - documentary short, 1953 - writer, producer, director
- Security Depends on You - training film, 1953 - director
- Basic Rescue No. 1: Five Basic Knots - training film, 1954 - co-director, co-producer with David Bairstow
- Basic Rescue No. 2: The Use of Levers - training film, 1954 - co-director, co-producer with David Bairstow
- Basic Rescue No. 3: The Use of Jacks - training film, 1954 - co-director, co-producer with David Bairstow
- Basic Rescue No. 4: The Single Ladder - training film, 1954 - co-director, co-producer with David Bairstow
- Basic Rescue No. 5: The Extension Ladder - training film, 1954 - co-director, co-producer with David Bairstow
- On the Spot: Aviation Medicine - documentary short, 1954 - director
- On the Spot: College in the Wilds - documentary short, 1954 - director
- On the Spot: The Doll Factory - documentary short, 1954 - director
- On the Spot: Dresden Story - documentary short, 1954 - editor, director, co-producer with Gordon Burwash & Grant McLean
- On the Spot: Frontier College - documentary short, 1954 - director
- On the Spot: Javanese Dancing - documentary short, Bernard Devlin 1954 - producer
- On the Spot: The Magnificent - documentary short, 1954 - director
- On the Spot: Story of a Newspaper - documentary short, 1954 - director
- On the Spot: Maritime Montage - documentary short, 1955 - co-director with Rollo Gamble
- Pilgrim Geese - documentary short, 1954 - producer, director
- Carnival - documentary short, 1955 - director
- Chickens by the Million - documentary short, 1955 - producer, director
- Dwarf Apple - documentary short, 1955 - host, producer, director
- Fight Against Blight - documentary short, 1955 - producer, director
- Getting Your Money's Worth in Eggs - documentary short, 1955 - producer, director
- Holly - documentary short, 1955 - host, producer, director
- Horse Ranch - documentary short, 1955 - host, producer, director
- Important Mr. Rat - documentary short, 1955 - producer, director
- Insect Lab - documentary short, 1955 - host, producer, director
- Packboard & Tumpline - documentary short, 1955 - producer, director
- Raising the Hogs the Market Wants - documentary short, 1955 - writer, producer, director
- Raw Material - short film, 1955 - director
- Soil Test - documentary short, 1955 - host, producer, director
- Sunflowers - documentary short, 1955 - host, producer, director
- Why Grow Fat Hogs? - documentary short, 1955 - writer, producer, director
- Are People Sheep? - documentary short, 1956 - director
- The Cage - short film, Fergus McDonell 1956 - producer
- Chair of Gold - documentary short, Thomas Farley 1956 - producer
- Embassy - documentary short, 1956 - producer
- Escape - documentary short, Thomas Farley 1956 - producer
- The Longer Trail - short film, Fergus McDonell 1956 - producer
- Man of America - documentary short, Thomas Farley 1956 - producer
- Monkey on the Back - documentary short, 1956 - editor, director
- Morning Incident - documentary short, Fergus McDonell 1956 - producer
- The Nativity Cycle - documentary short, Fergus McDonell 1956 - producer
- Woman Alone - documentary short, 1956 - director
- The Yellow Leaf - short film, Fergus McDonell 1956 - producer
- The Shepherd - documentary short, 1956 - writer, producer, director
- The Visit - short film, Bernard Devlin 1956 - producer
- Fighter Wing - documentary short, Perspective series, Don Haldane 1956 - producer
- Go to Blazes - documentary short, Perspective series, Thomas Farley 1956 - producer
- Canadians Abroad - documentary short, Perspective series, Don Haldane 1956 - producer
- Back Into the Sun - documentary short, Perspective series, Fergus McDonell 1956 - producer
- The Deserter - documentary short, Perspective series 1956 - director
- Night Children - documentary short, Perspective series, Bernard Devlin 1956 - producer
- Sable Island - documentary short, Perspective series, Allan Wargon 1956 - producer
- The Barrier - documentary, Perspective series, Thomas Farley 1957 - producer
- Capital City - documentary short, Perspective series, Fergus McDonell 1957 - producer
- Crossroads - documentary short, Perspective series, Don Haldane 1957 - producer
- Double Verdict - documentary short, Perspective series, Fergus McDonell 1957 - producer
- Fires of Envy - short film, Perspective series, Don Haldane 1957 - producer
- Haiti - documentary short, Perspective series, Léonard Forest 1957 - producer
- The Happy Fugitive - documentary short, Perspective series, Fergus McDonell 1957 - producer
- Wolfe and Montcalm - short film, Perspective series, Allan Wargon 1957 - producer
- The Suspects - short film, Perspective series, Bernard Devlin 1957 - producer
- Howard - short film, Perspective series, Don Haldane 1957 - producer
- Joe and Roxy - short film, Perspective series, Don Haldane 1957 - producer
- Aye Follow Your Own - short film, 1957 - director
- A Letter from Oxford - documentary short, 1957 - director
- None But the Lonely - documentary short, Fergus McDonell 1957 - producer
- One Summer's Day - documentary short, Thomas Farley 1957 - producer
- The Street - short film, Fergus McDonell 1957 - producer
- The Harvest - short film, Fergus McDonell 1957 - producer
- Test Pilot - short film, Fergus McDonell 1957 - producer
- The Trap Thief - short film, Allan Wargon 1957 - producer
- Who Is Sylvia? - short film, Don Haldane 1957 - producer
- The Whole World Over - documentary short, Don Haldane and Léonard Forest 1957 - writer, producer
- The Ghost That Talked - documentary short, Don Haldane 1957 - producer
- Encounter at Trinity - documentary short, Allan Wargon 1957 - producer
- Conquest of Cold - documentary short, 1958 - director
- The Decision - documentary short, 1958 - director
- Fire in Town - documentary short, 1958 - director
- Journey from Etsa - documentary short, 1958 - director
- Northwest Neighbours - documentary short, 1958 - director
- People of the Peace - documentary short, 1958 - director
- School for the Stage - documentary short, 1958 - director
- 1,500,000 of Us - documentary short, 1959 - director
- Canada: World Citizen - documentary short, 1959 - director
- The Good Old Days - 1959 - host, producer, director
- Grassland Farming` - documentary short, Donald Wilder 1959 - producer
- It's a Woman's World - documentary short, 1959 - host, producer, director
- Lord Elgin: Voice of the People - short film, 1959 - director
- Prairie Bonanza - documentary short, 1959 - director
- Report on Cancer - documentary short, 1959 - director
- U.N. in the Classroom - documentary short, Don Haldane 1959 - producer
- On Prescription Only - documentary short, 1960 - director
- This Electronic World - documentary short, 1960 - director
- Charles Tupper: The Big Man - short film, Morten Parker 1961 - producer
- Courtship - documentary, Allan Wargon 1961 - co-producer with Gordon Burwash
- Four Teachers` - documentary, Donald Ginsberg 1961 - co-producer with Gordon Burwash
- John A. Macdonald: The Impossible Idea - short film, Gordon Burwash 1961 - producer
- Joseph Howe: The Tribune of Nova Scotia - short film, 1961 - producer, director
- Lord Durham - short film, John Howe 1961 - producer
- Louis-Joseph Papineau: The Demi-God - short film, Louis-Georges Carrier 1961 - producer
- Robert Baldwin: A Matter of Principle - short film, John Howe 1961 - producer
- William Lyon Mackenzie: A Friend to His Country - short film, 1961 - producer, director
- Alexander Galt: The Stubborn Idealist - short film, 1962 - producer, director
- Georges-Etienne Cartier: The Lion of Québec - short film, John Howe 1962 - producer
- Canada: Animal Vaccine - documentary short, Hector Lemieux 1963 - producer
- Canada: Beam Therapy - documentary short, Hector Lemieux 1963 - producer
- Canada: Beef Cattle - documentary short, Hector Lemieux 1963 - producer
- Canada: Calf Leather - documentary short, Hector Lemieux 1963 - producer
- Canada: Fibres, Yarns and Fabrics - documentary short, Hector Lemieux 1963 - producer
- Canada: Heating Units - documentary short, Hector Lemieux 1963 - producer
- Canada: Human Vaccine - documentary short, Hector Lemieux 1963 - producer
- Canada: Hydraulic Tracing - documentary short, Hector Lemieux 1963 - producer
- Canada: Low Temperature Gas - documentary short, Hector Lemieux 1963 - producer
- Canada: Pre-fab Homes - documentary short, Hector Lemieux 1963 - producer
- Canada: Swine - documentary short, Hector Lemieux 1963 - producer
- Canada: Tobacco - documentary short, Hector Lemieux 1963 - producer
- Canada: White Goods - documentary short, Hector Lemieux 1963 - producer
- The Head Men - documentary short, 1963 - co-director with John Howe
- Three Apprentices - documentary short, 1963 - co-writer and -director with John Howe
- Three Grandmothers - documentary short, 1963 - co-director with John Howe
- Wedding Day - documentary short, 1963 - co-director with Hector Lemieux and John Howe
- 23 Skidoo - experimental short, 1964 - editor, producer, director
- Phoebe - short film, George Kaczender 1964 - producer
- Portrait of the Artist - documentary short, 1964 - co-director with Gordon Burwash and John Howe
- The Stage to Three - documentary short, 1964 - writer, producer, director
- Three Country Boys - documentary short, 1964 - producer, co-director with Gordon Burwash & John Kemeny
- Three Fishermen - documentary short, 1964 - co-director with John Kemeny
- Buster Keaton Rides Again - documentary short, John Spotton 1965 - producer
- John Hirsch: A Portrait of a Man and a Theatre - documentary short, Mort Ransen 1965 - producer
- Octopus Hunt - documentary short, Bernard Devlin 1965 - producer
- High Steel - documentary short, Don Owen 1965 - producer
- The Railrodder - short film, Gerald Potterton 1965 - producer
- The Way of Science - documentary short, Guy L. Coté 1965 - producer
- Each Day That Comes - documentary short, Graham Parker 1966 - producer
- Paddle to the Sea - documentary short, Bill Mason 1966 - producer
- Notes for a Film About Donna & Gail - short film, Don Owen 1966 - producer
- Anti-Submarine Warfare: Maritime Briefing - training film, 1967 - director
- A Little Fellow from Gambo: The Joey Smallwood Story - documentary, 1970 - writer, producer, director
- The Tenth Frontier, Volume 6 - anthology, 2000 - producer, director

== Awards ==
The Oyster Man (1950)

- 3rd Canadian Film Awards, Ottawa: Honourable Mention, Non-Theatrical, 1951

The Son (1952)

- 5th Canadian Film Awards, Montreal: Honourable Mention, 1953

Herring Hunt (1953)

- Yorkton Film Festival, Yorkton, Saskatchewan: Second Place, Agricultural and Industrial, 1954
- 6th Canadian Film Awards, Montreal: Special Mention, 1954
- 26th Academy Awards, Los Angeles: Nominee: Best Live Action Short Subject, 1954

Monkey on the Back (1956)

- 8th Canadian Film Awards, Stratford, Ontario: Honourable Mention, TV Information, 1956

Man of America (1956)

- Golden Reel International Film Festival, Film Council of America, New York: Silver Reel Award, International Understanding, 1957

Go to Blazes (1956)

- Golden Reel International Film Festival, Film Council of America, New York: Silver Reel Award, Safety, 1957
- National Committee on Films for Safety, Chicago: Bronze Plaque, First Place, Inspirational, General, 1957

The Shepherd (1956)

- Yorkton Film Festival, Yorkton, Saskatchewan: First Place, General Interest, 1956
- Edinburgh International Film Festival, Edinburgh, Scotland: Diploma of Merit, 1956
- Cape Town International Film Festival, Cape Town: Certificate of Merit, 1956
- Johannesburg International Film Festival, Johannesburg: Certificate of Merit, 1956
- Cork International Film Festival, Cork: Certificate of Merit, 1956
- Durban International Film Festival, Durban: Honorable Mention, 1956
- 8th Canadian Film Awards, Stratford, Ontario: Honourable Mention, Theatrical Short, 1956

Fire in Town (1958)

- 11th Canadian Film Awards, Toronto: Award of Merit, Training and Instruction, 1959
- National Committee for Prevention of Child Abuse, Chicago: Certificate of Merit, 1959

William Lyon Mackenzie: A Friend to His Country (1961)

- 14th Canadian Film Awards, Toronto: Best Film, TV Information, 1962

Courtship (1961)

- Ohio State Radio and TV Awards, Columbus, Ohio: Honorable Mention, 1962

23 Skidoo (1964)

- Kraków Film Festival, Kraków: Special Mention, 1965
- British Academy Film Awards, London: Nominee: Best Short Film
- British Academy Film Awards, London: Nominee: United Nations Award for "the best film embodying one or more of the principles of the United Nations Charter in 1965".

Phoebe (1964)

- Montreal International Film Festival, Montreal: First Prize, Short Subjects, 1965
- International Short Film Festival Oberhausen, Oberhausen: Bronze Plaque - Prize of the German Catholic Film Service, 1965
- American Film and Video Festival, New York: Blue Ribbon, Guidance, 1966
- Melbourne Film Festival, Melbourne: Diploma of Merit, 1966

Buster Keaton Rides Again (1965)

- 18th Canadian Film Awards, Montreal: Best Film, General Information, 1966
- Montreal International Film Festival, Montreal: First Prize, Medium-Length Films, 1966
- Golden Gate International Film Festival, San Francisco: Silver Trophy, Documentary, 1966
- International Exhibition of the Documentary Film, Venice: CIDALC Special Prize, 1966
- American Film and Video Festival, New York: First Prize, Music, Literature & Films, 1967
- Melbourne Film Festival, Melbourne: Special Prize for Best Biographical Documentary, 1967
- MIFED International Contest of Public Relations, Milan: Gold Medal 1968
- 20th British Academy Film Awards, London: Nominee: BAFTA Award for Best Documentary, 1967

High Steel (1965)

- Cork International Film Festival, Cork, Ireland: Bronze Statuette of St. Finbarr - First Prize, Documentary, 1966
- Locarno Film Festival, Locarno, Switzerland: Diploma of Honour, 1967
- Kraków Film Festival, Kraków, Poland: Diploma of Honour, 1967
- Melbourne Film Festival, Melbourne: Diploma of Merit, 1967
- International Days of Short Films, Tours, France: Prize of the Cine-Clubs, 1967
- Berlin International Film Festival, Berlin: Special Youth Prize, 1967

The Railrodder (1965)

- Festival of Tourist and Folklore Films, Brussels: Femina Award for Cinema, 1966
- 18th Canadian Film Awards, Montreal: Best Travel and Recreation Film, 1966
- Berlin International Film Festival, Berlin: Special Commendation, 1965
- BFI London Film Festival, London: Outstanding Film of the Year, 1966
- Locarno Film Festival, Locarno, Switzerland: Diploma of Honor, 1966
- Philadelphia International Festival of Short Films, Philadelphia: Award of Exceptional Merit, 1971

Octopus Hunt (1965)

- Electronic, Nuclear and Teleradio Cinematographic Review, Rome: Gold Rocket, Sports Films, 1968

Paddle to the Sea (1966)

- Yorkton Film Festival, Yorkton, Saskatchewan: First Place, Creative Arts and Experimental Films, 1967
- Salerno Film Festival, Salerno, Italy: First Prize, Information Films, 1967
- American Film and Video Festival, New York: Blue Ribbon, Stories for Children, 1967
- International Educational Film Festival, Tehran, Iran: Golden Delfan, First Prize, Educational Films for Children, 1967
- La Plata International Children's Film Festival, La Plata: Silver Plaque, 1968
- Film Critics and Journalists Association of Ceylon, Colombo, Sri Lanka: Certificate of Merit, 1969
- International Festival of Short Films, Philadelphia: Award for Exceptional Merit, 1971
- Educational Film Library Association of America, New York - Sightlines Magazine list of 10 Best Films of the Last Ten Years, 1968
- International Film & Television Festival of New York: Silver Medal, Education, Language Arts, 1987
- 40th Academy Awards, Los Angeles: Nominee: Best Live Action Short Film, 1968

Each Day That Comes (1966)

- Melbourne Film Festival, Melbourne: Diploma of Merit, 1967

Notes for a Film About Donna and Gail (1966)

- Montreal International Film Festival, Montreal: First Prize, Medium Length, 1966
- 19th Canadian Film Awards, Montreal: Genie Award for Best Film, General Information, 1967
- Melbourne Film Festival, Melbourne: Diploma of Merit, 1967

A Little Fellow from Gambo: The Joey Smallwood Story (1970)

- 22nd Canadian Film Awards, Toronto: Genie Award for Best Public Affairs Film, 1970
- 22nd Canadian Film Awards, Toronto: Genie Award for Best TV Information Film, 1970
- 22nd Canadian Film Awards, Toronto: Best Director to Julian Biggs, 1970
