= Robert Anderson (filmmaker) =

Canadian filmmaker (1913–1997)

- Born: 1913; Bismarck, North Dakota
- Died: June 3, 1997 (aged 83–84); Ottawa, Ontario
- Occupations: Director, producer, writer, narrator
- Years active: 1943–1977

Robert Anderson (1913 – June 3, 1997) was a Canadian filmmaker who specialized in films about psychiatry, first with the National Film Board of Canada, and then through his own company. He was the first filmmaker to create truthful, objective films about mental health and addiction, and to make films of this type using actual patients, doctors and hospitals, rather than actors in reconstructions. His most famous film is Drug Addict, which caused a furor when it was banned in the United States. Anderson was co-founder of the Canadian National Science Film Library, and he played a large role in bringing television to the Canadian House of Commons.

== Biography ==
Anderson was born in Bismarck, North Dakota. His family moved to Winnipeg when he was 14, and then to Saskatoon. While in law school at the University of Saskatchewan, he and a friend proposed to the local radio station, CFQC, that they do a weekly variety show called University Hour; the show ran for a year. After graduation, Anderson moved to Regina and got a $10.00 a week job at CHWC radio, working as an announcer, copywriter and DJ.

In 1935, Anderson moved to Ottawa, where he was hired by Ernie Bushnell to work as an announcer at CRCO (now CBO, or CBC Radio Ottawa). When the CBC came into being in 1936, and acquired CRCO, Anderson was sent to Halifax as one of the four people who ran the CBC's Maritime Region. In 1938, he was sent back to Ottawa, where he became the CRCO program director and, along with Lorne Greene and Allan McFee, part of the CBC's announcing team. It was this team that also trained other CBC employees in voice technique, diction and pronunciation.

In 1943, Anderson was assigned to produce a series of talks by John Grierson, who had just become the head of the National Film Board of Canada (NFB). Grierson asked him to join the NFB; he was first assigned to produce and direct some military and nature films. In the course of making the military films, Anderson met Brock Chisholm, a psychiatrist who was, at the time, Director General of Medical Services for the Canadian Army. At Chisholm's suggestion, the NFB made the film A Soldier? Afraid?. This piqued Anderson's interest in psychiatry; at the time, people didn't talk about mental health and he saw the need and opportunity.

Anderson spent the next four years making the 15-film series Mental Mechanisms. To this point, films about mental illness had used actors to re-create situations. Anderson used actual patients, in real clinics, with real doctors. The films had a startling effect. Anderson recalled that, when his film The Feeling of Rejection was shown at the 1947 annual meeting of the American Psychiatric Association in New York, “there was absolute bedlam…. They were shouting that no one should be shown this film unless at least one highly qualified psychiatrist was present to deal with the anxiety that it would provoke.’’

The public wanted these films; they were shown in theatres, and community organizations used them to encourage the opening of mental health clinics. And there was interest in the subject within the American government. At this time, the outgoing Chief of Information at the National Institute of Mental Health was Alberta Jacoby. She was married to the film producer Irving A. Jacoby, and they wanted to form something akin to the NFB and make films on mental illness. In 1948, they asked Anderson to move to New York and head up their new Mental Health Film Board. Anderson took a leave of absence from the NFB and moved to New York. Alberta Jacoby had a stable of filmmakers who had already made some films on mental illness; they brought their films to Anderson, who recalled: “Almost all of them, in bringing their films to me said “You have to remember, it’s what the sponsor wanted.” Well, that was an admission of consequence. Unless the film maker is responsible enough to control the content of the film, it is probably not a good film.” Anderson began to assemble his own team, but McCarthyism was rife and people in Washington claimed that Anderson’s filmmakers were communists. Frustrated, Anderson returned to Canada and continued with the Mental Mechanisms series.

== The United States Ban of Drug Addict ==
In 1947, with the assistance of Health and Welfare Canada and R.C.M.P. Commissioner Leonard Nicholson, Anderson made the 34-minute film Drug Addict, which was intended as a training film for law enforcement and medical professionals. For research, he followed Vancouver-area R.C.M.P., watching them kick in doors, arrest dealers and burn a poppy field. He shot most of the film in New York, in Harlem, Chinatown and the port shipyards. He finished shooting in Montreal, using street addicts as actors.

Drug Addict depicted themes that, for some, were problematic. It showed that addicts are from all races and classes, that most traffickers are white, that law enforcement only targets low-level dealers, that there is little difference between addiction to legal and illegal drugs, that cocaine is not necessarily addictive, that drug addicts are not violent, that law-enforcement control of it is impossible, and that drug addiction is a sickness.

The film heartened Alfred R. Lindesmith, an Indiana University sociology professor who advocated the medical treatment of drug addiction. In 1940, he published the article Dope Fiend Mythology, in which he criticized the media’s use of stereotypes such as ‘freak’ and ‘dope fiend’, and stated that drug addicts are normal human beings with an illness, and that punitive actions against them are unreasonable.

Drug Addict outraged Harry J. Anslinger, the ‘moral enforcer’ who was head of the Federal Bureau of Narcotics (FBN) from 1930 to 1962. The early 20th-century mass migration of minorities to northern U.S. cities, and the emergence of an illicit narcotics market, had created public anxiety and suspicion directed at immigrants and people of color. Anslinger, who had a hard-line drug policy, and who had the support of Democrats, Republicans, the Women's Christian Temperance Union and many churches, exploited these fears by linking drugs to minorities. As he also controlled licensing for the importation of opiates, he had the support of drug companies. And he controlled the flow of information about drugs and drug addiction; as late as the 1950s, the intimidation of the FBN made it difficult to publish books on drugs or drug use.

Beginning in 1939, Anslinger directly targeted Alfred Lindesmith with a campaign of intimidation, slander and guilt-by-association. He attempted to intimidate the Indiana University, he formally called Lindesmith a ‘drug addict’, a ‘crackpot’ and a ‘communist’. It is believed that the FBN tapped Lindesmith's phone and planted, or attempted to plant, drugs in his house and car.

Lindesmith, who initially had no support from his peers, viewed Drug Addict as the opening of a window, a significant aid in affecting American perceptions of drug use and addiction, and an opportunity to end prohibitionist policies. Drug Addict depicts addicts as desperate, pathetic, and sick individuals, suffering from guilt and withdrawal—it was a direct rebuttal to the rationale for Anslinger's policies. Anslinger knew of the potential political hazards which Drug Addict could engender if the public was presented with such a rebuttal, particularly one produced with the assistance of a government as credible as Canada's, and its national police force. He saw the film as a threat to the existence of the FBN.

When Lindesmith traveled to Ottawa to view the film and attend a United Nations reception for it, Anslinger had the American ambassador request that Lindesmith not be allowed to see the film. The Canadian government declined the request. Anslinger asked that the Canadian government not distribute the film in the United States, and that it censor the film within its own borders; the Canadians rejected the request. He then had the film banned in the United States and requested that the Canadian government ban it in Canada; that request was refused.

While the two men wrote competing New York Times editorials, Anslinger falsely claimed that the film had been banned under the Motion Picture Association code. The Women's Christian Temperance Union pressured Lindesmith to stop his campaign; Anslinger tried to involve J. Edgar Hoover. But Indiana University had stood behind Lindesmith; eventually, after years of being harassed themselves, physicians and lawyers sided with him. The American Bar Association, the American Medical Association and Indiana University formed a committee to study drug addiction and, in 1961, published a report, edited by Lindesmith, called Drug Addiction – Crime or Disease. Anslinger tried to stop its publication. His superiors told him to cease his campaign against Lindesmith; when he did not, he was scrutinized for insubordination and, in 1962, he was forced to resign. Technically, Drug Addict remains banned in the United States.

== Breakdown ==
Anderson's brother-in-law was the Regina architect Ken Black. At the time, he was building Valley View Centre in Moose Jaw, a sprawling, 3,000-bed facility for the mentally disabled. In the course of doing research for his design, he had traveled to other institutions and shared with Anderson what he had seen. Anderson, who called the mental hospitals of the day “snake pits”, was inspired to make a film on a mental hospital, to be called Breakdown (1951). No Ontario psychiatrist would let him into a hospital, so he went to Protestant Hospital for the Insane in Verdun, Quebec. For research, he spent a month living on the grounds, spending 20 hours a day with the patients. But he couldn't film there; he was able to get permission to film at Essondale, near Vancouver. With a crew of nine, including cameraman Osmond Borradaile who came out of retirement to make the film, Anderson used the hospital's doctors, staff and patients, explaining “I prefer to work with real people. If they have had the kind of life experience you are after, you can get them, not to act, but to react and there is then the possibility of getting some very convincing performances. It doesn’t always work, but when it does it is dynamite.”

To the amazement of officials at Health and Welfare Canada, the patients who participated began to show improvement. He also cast patients’ family members (including Allan Fotheringham). When the film was finished, everyone in it toured the province to stage the film. The film was well received and Health and Welfare Canada canceled its plans to build a second mental hospital.

== Post-NFB ==
In 1951, Anderson was sent to London as the NFB's first Commonwealth Exchange Director at the Crown Film Unit. While he was there, he could see that the British government was taking steps to shut down that unit—it would be closed in 1952. Anderson returned to Ottawa, where he found that the Canadian government was in the process of moving the NFB head office to Montreal, and making other organizational changes. Anderson decided to go out on his own and left the NFB in 1956, forming Robert Anderson Associates. He used his NFB colleague Fergus McDonell as his editor; NFB photographer, writer and director Doug Wilkinson became Robert Anderson Associates’ Vice-president until both men retired from filmmaking in 1976.

One of his first independent projects was the 12-film series The Disordered Mind, which ran on the CBC. The films were psychiatric case studies of real people with real problems working with real doctors. It was made for television, but it was strong enough to be used in the training of nurses and doctors and related disciplines and was internationally distributed. Many of his films were commissioned by pharmaceutical companies; others came from suggestions by the medical community. His 1965 film Smoking and Lung Cancer was made for the Montreal Chest Institute. (Its original title was The Left Lung of Edward R. Murrow. Murrow, who was dying of lung cancer and campaigning against smoking, backed out.) His 1963 film Mrs. Reynolds Needs a Nurse is still used in nursing schools.

Anderson spent two years as a consultant to National Educational Television, the precursor of PBS. He had earlier been hired by Geigy Pharmaceuticals to make the films The Faces Of Depression and Emotional Factors In General Practice. In doing the research for them, he had seen ten short films that a physicist had made in his laboratory. He went to see Edgar Steacie, president of the National Research Council of Canada (NRC) and suggested that Canada make scientific films. He was hired as a consultant to the NRC, and the two men created the National Science Film Library (later absorbed by the National Science Library).

In 1976, Anderson closed down his production company to retire, but political advisor Thomas Van Dusen hired him to work on Parliament Hill. The Canadian government wanted to put Parliamentary debate on the air, live. There was significant resistance to this, and Anderson was hired to convince MPs to agree to it. He was given the title of ‘Special Advisor to the President of the Privy Council on Broadcasting Parliament’. It took a year, but he convinced members of all three parties and the Cabinet, and the Motion to Broadcast was passed. On Oct. 17, 1977, parliamentary proceedings in Canada were broadcast live on television for the first time.

== Personal life and death ==
Anderson was married to Catherine Jones, a successful writer who worked on many of his films. They had two children. In retirement, he was active with the Western Canada Wilderness Committee, Greenpeace and Amnesty International. He died at his home in Ottawa on July 3, 1997, at age 87.

== Filmography ==
National Film Board of Canada

- Use Your Head: The Tump-Line Principle of Carrying Loads - documentary short 1944 - writer, producer, director
- Eyes Front No. 21 - documentary short 1945 - writer, director
- Psychological First Aid - training film 1945 - director
- Churchill Project - Summer 1946 - documentary short 1946 - director, producer
- Disposal of 2800 Tons of Mustard Gas - documentary short, E.W. Scythes 1946 - executive producer
- A Soldier? Afraid? - training film 1946 - director
- Exercise Musk-Ox - documentary 1946 - narrator, co-producer and co-director with E.W. Scythes
- Going North - documentary 1948 - producer and director
- A New Map for Canada - documentary short 1948 - co-producer and -director with James Beveridge and John H. Tyo
- The Navy Flies - documentary short 1948 - co-producer and -director with Michael Spencer
- The Feeling of Rejection - documentary short, Mental Mechanisms Series 1947 - director, co-producer with Evelyn Spice Cherry
- The Feeling of Hostility - documentary short, Mental Mechanisms Series 1948 - producer, director, co-writer with Bruce Ruddick
- Drug Addict - documentary short, Mental Mechanisms Series 1948 - writer, producer, director
- Pay-off in Pain - documentary short, Mental Mechanisms Series 1948 - director
- Over-Dependency - documentary short, Mental Mechanisms Series 1949 - producer, director, co-writer with Bruce Ruddick and Miguel Prados
- Feelings of Depression, documentary short, Stanley Jackson 1950 - co-producer with Tom Daly
- Breakdown - documentary, Mental Mechanisms Series 1951 - narrator, writer, director, co-producer with Tom Daly
- Depressive States, Part 1 - documentary short, Mental Mechanisms Series, Stanley Jackson 1951 - writer, producer
- Depressive States, Part 2 - documentary short, Mental Mechanisms Series, Stanley Jackson 1951 - writer, producer
- Hallucinations - documentary short, Mental Mechanisms Series, Stanley Jackson 1951 - writer, producer
- Manic State - documentary short, Mental Mechanisms Series, Stanley Jackson 1951 - writer, producer
- Organic Reaction Type - Senile - documentary short, Mental Mechanisms Series, Stanley Jackson 1951 - writer, producer
- Paranoid Conditions - documentary short, Mental Mechanisms Series, Stanley Jackson 1951 - writer, producer
- Schizophrenia - Catatonic Type - documentary short, Mental Mechanisms Series, Stanley Jackson 1951 - writer, producer
- Schizophrenia - Hebephrenic Type - documentary short, Mental Mechanisms Series, Stanley Jackson 1951 - writer, producer
- Schizophrenia - Simple Type: Deteriorated - documentary short, Mental Mechanisms Series, Stanley Jackson 1951 - writer, producer
- Trade Fair - documentary short, 1952 - writer, director
- Fighting Forest Fires with Hand Tools - documentary short, 1952 - writer
- Window on Canada No. 9 - documentary short, 1953 - producer and director
- Window on Canada No. 10 - documentary short, 1953 - producer and director
- Window on Canada No. 11 - documentary short, 1953 - producer and director
- Window on Canada No. 12 - documentary short, 1953 - producer and director
- Window on Canada No. 13 - documentary short, 1953 - producer and director
- Window on Canada No. 14 - documentary short, 1953 - producer and director
- Window on Canada No. 15 - documentary short, 1953 - producer and director
- Window on Canada No. 16 - documentary short, 1953 - producer and director
- Window on Canada No. 17 - documentary short, 1953 - producer and director
- Window on Canada No. 18 - documentary short, 1953 - producer and director
- Window on Canada No. 19 - documentary short, 1953 - producer and director
- Window on Canada No. 20 - documentary short, 1953 - producer and director
- Window on Canada No. 21 - documentary short, 1953 - producer and director
- Country Magistrate - documentary short 1953 - writer, director
- Mission Ship - documentary short 1953 - director, co-writer with Duncan Ross
- On the Spot: School for Charm - documentary short, Bernard Devlin 1953 - executive producer
- On the Spot: Winnipeg Ballet - documentary short, Bernard Devlin 1953 - executive producer
- On the Spot: The Winnipeg Story - documentary short, Bernard Devlin 1953 - executive producer
- On the Spot: Oil - documentary short, Bernard Devlin 1953 - executive producer
- On the Spot: Transpacific Flight - documentary short, Bernard Devlin 1953 - executive producer
- On the Spot: It's Raining Soldiers! - documentary short, Bernard Devlin 1953 - executive producer
- On the Spot: Hotel Story - documentary short, Bernard Devlin 1953 - executive producer
- On the Spot: The Zoo in Stanley Park - documentary short, Bernard Devlin 1953 - executive producer
- On the Spot: Radar Station - documentary short, Allen Stark 1953 - executive producer
- On the Spot: Football Story - documentary short, Bernard Devlin 1953 - executive producer
- On the Spot: Saskatchewan Farm Museum - documentary short, Bernard Devlin 1953 - executive producer
- On the Spot: The Mounties' Crime Lab - documentary short, Bernard Devlin 1953 - executive producer
- Regards sur le Canada Numbers 1-13 - documentary shorts, 1954 - co-director with Bernard Devlin
- L'abbé Pierre – documentary short, 1954 – director, co-producer with Bernard Devlin
- Les Polonais du Canada – documentary short, Bernard Devlin 1954 – director, co-producer with Bernard Devlin
- Eye Witness No. 67 - documentary short 1954 - co-director with Fernand Ménard
- Le prospecteur - documentary short, Bernard Devlin 1954 – executive producer
- L'or de l'Abitibi - documentary short, Bernard Devlin 1954 – executive producer
- On the Spot: Dresden Story - documentary short, Julian Biggs 1954 - executive producer
- On the Spot: Story of a Newspaper - documentary short, Julian Biggs 1954 - Devlin producer
- On the Spot: The Magic Men - documentary short, Jack Olsen 1954 - executive producer
- On the Spot: Threshermen’s Reunion - documentary short, Rollo Gamble 1954 - producer, executive producer
- On the Spot: Survival in the Bush - documentary short Bernard Devlin 1954 - host, narrator, producer, executive producer
- On the Spot: The Strong Man - documentary short Bernard Devlin 1954 - executive producer
- On the Spot: Vancouver's Chinatown - documentary short Bernard Devlin 1954 - executive producer
- On the Spot: Javanese Dancing - documentary short, Bernard Devlin 1954 - executive producer
- On the Spot: On Leave in Tokyo - documentary short, Bernard Devlin 1954 - executive producer
- On the Spot: Micro Movies - documentary short, Bernard Devlin 1954 - executive producer
- On the Spot: Judo - Jinks - documentary short, Bernard Devlin 1954 - executive producer
- On the Spot: Korea, After the War - documentary short, Bernard Devlin 1954 - executive producer
- On the Spot: French Cuisine - documentary short, Bernard Devlin 1954 - executive producer
- On the Spot: Artist in Montreal - documentary short, Jean Palardy 1954 - co-host, producer, executive producer
- On the Spot: Hidden Power - documentary short, John Feeney 1954 - executive producer
- On the Spot: Test Pilot - documentary short, Allen Stark 1954 - executive producer
- On the Spot: Police Club for Boys - documentary short, Allen Stark 1954 - executive producer
- On the Spot: Movies in the Mill - documentary short, Allen Stark 1954 - executive producer
- On the Spot: The Traffic Cop - documentary short, Jack Olsen 1954 - executive producer
- On the Spot: Montreal Fire Department - documentary short, Allen Stark 1954 - executive producer
- On the Spot: Chinese Canadians - documentary short, Allen Stark 1954 - producer, executive producer
- On the Spot: Food and Drug Patrol - documentary short, Allen Stark 1954 - producer, executive producer
- On the Spot: Laurentian Skiing - documentary short, Allen Stark 1954 - executive producer
- On the Spot: Workshop for Science - documentary short, Gordon Burwash and Grant McLean 1954 - executive producer
- On the Spot: Auto Production - documentary short, John Spotton 1954 – executive producer
- On the Spot: The Magnificent - documentary short, Julian Biggs 1954 - producer, executive producer
- On the Spot: How to Climb a Mountain - documentary short, Walford Hewitson 1954 - narrator, producer
- On the Spot: Bureau of Missing Persons - documentary short, Bernard Devlin 1954 - executive producer
- On the Spot: Better Business Bureau - documentary short, Bernard Devlin 1954 - executive producer
- On the Spot: Chosen Children - documentary short, Bernard Devlin 1954 - executive producer
- On the Spot: Curtain Time in Ottawa - documentary short, Bernard Devlin 1954 - executive producer
- On the Spot: Deep Sleep - documentary short, Jack Olsen 1954 - executive producer
- On the Spot: Aviation Medicine - documentary short, Julian Biggs 1954 - executive producer
- On the Spot: The Doll Factory - documentary short, Julian Biggs 1954 - executive producer
- On the Spot: End of Tour - documentary short, Bernard Devlin 1954 - executive producer
- On the Spot: Harness Racing - documentary short, Bernard Devlin 1954 - executive producer
- On the Spot: Camera Men - documentary short, Allen Stark 1954 - executive producer
- On the Spot: Cancer Clinic - documentary short, Allen Stark 1954 - executive producer
- On the Spot: The Car Mart - documentary short, Walford Hewitson 1954 - executive producer
- On the Spot: Trends in Textiles - documentary short, Rollo Gamble 1955 - executive producer
- On the Spot: Vertical Flight - documentary short, Grant McLean 1955 - executive producer 30
- On the Spot: Two Countries, One Street - documentary short, Jean Palardy 1955 - narrator, producer, executive producer
- On the Spot: Maritime Montage - documentary short, Julian Biggs and Rollo Gamble 1955 - producer, executive producer
- On the Spot: Lunenburg - Home of the Bluenose - documentary short, Ernest Reid 1955 - producer, executive producer
- On the Spot: Gold Rush Land - documentary short, Allen Stark 1955 - producer, executive producer
- On the Spot: Food Facts - documentary short, John Feeney 1955 - executive producer
- On the Spot: Prairie University - documentary short, John Feeney 1955 - producer, executive producer
- On the Spot: Forest Wardens - documentary short, Allen Stark 1955 - executive producer
- On the Spot: Christmas Comes Twice - documentary short, Gordon Burwash & Grant McLean 1955 - executive producer
- On the Spot: Routine Flight - documentary short, Gordon Burwash & Grant McLean 1955 - executive producer
- On the Spot: Backstage at Parliament - documentary short, Don Haldane 1955 - executive producer
- On the Spot: Child Guidance Clinic - documentary short, Don Haldane 1955 - executive producer
- On the Spot: Alcoholism - documentary short, Don Haldane 1955 - executive producer
- On the Spot: Career College - documentary short, Rollo Gamble 1955 - executive producer
- Le 22e régiment en Allemagne - documentary short, Bernard Devlin 1955 - producer
- Nos aviateurs outre-mer - documentary short, Bernard Devlin 1955 - producer
- Le chauffard - documentary short, Bernard Devlin 1955 - producer
- Montréal historique - documentary short, Bernard Daumale 1955 - producer
- Soirée de chantiers - documentary short, Jean Palardy 1955 - producer
- Sourds-muets (Deaf-Mutes) - documentary short, Bernard Daumale 1955 - producer
- Circulation à Montréal - documentary short, Bernard Devlin 1955 - producer
- Boîte de nuit - documentary short, Bernard Devlin 1955 – executive producer
- Le colon - documentary short, Bernard Devlin 1955 – executive producer
- La crèche d'Youville - documentary short, Bernard Devlin 1955 – executive producer
- Radio Police - documentary short, Bernard Devlin 1955 - producer
- Retour à Dieppe - documentary short, Bernard Devlin 1955 – executive producer
- Futures in Oil - documentary short, 1956 - director

Robert Anderson Associates

- The Medical Use of Hypnosis (1958), CBC
- Voices in Space (1959), CBC
- Russia and Canada: Polar Expansion (1959), CBC
- New North: Part 2. New Patterns in Flight (1959), CBC
- Man's Adaptability to Cold (Polar People) (1959), CBC
- Faces of Depression (1959), Geigy Pharmaceuticals
- Pathological Anxiety (1960), Geigy Pharmaceuticals
- The Disordered Mind: Psychosomatic Disorders: A Coronary (1960), CBC
- The Disordered Mind: Psychoneurotic Conditions: A Pathological Anxiety (1960), CBC
- The Disordered Mind: Psychotic Conditions: A Depression (1960), CBC
- The Disordered Mind: Anti-Social Personality Disorders: A Psychopath (1960), CBC
- Emotional Factors in General Practice (1960), Geigy Pharmaceuticals
- Mrs. Reynolds Needs a Nurse (1963), Smith, Kline & French Laboratories
- The Disordered Mind: Psychosomatic Conditions: Obesity (1963), CBC
- The Disordered Mind: The Obsessive-Compulsive Neurosis (1963), CBC
- The Disordered Mind: Psychotic Conditions: Paranoid Schizophrenia (1963), CBC
- The Disordered Mind: The Compulsive Car Thief (1963), CBC
- Smoking and Lung Cancer (1965)
- The Disordered Mind: Aggressive Child (1966), CBC
- The Third Eye (1965) Smith, Kline & French Laboratories
- The Disordered Mind: Girl in Danger (1966), CBC
- The Disordered Mind: Bright Boy, Bad Scholar (1966), CBC
- The Disordered Mind: Afraid of School (1966), CBC
- I'm Not Too Famous At It: A Definition of Learning Disabilities (1969), Contemporary Films/McGraw Hill
- It Feels Like You’re Left Out of the World: Experiencing Learning Disabilities (1969), Contemporary Films/McGraw Hill
- Old Enough but Not Ready: Early Recognition of Learning Disabilities (1969), Contemporary Films/McGraw Hill
- Teaching the Way They Learn: Remediation of Learning Disabilities (1969), Contemporary Films/McGraw Hill
- Another Magic Bullet (1972), Hoffmann-La Roche
