= R.C.M.P. (TV series) =

Canadian drama TV series (1959–1960)

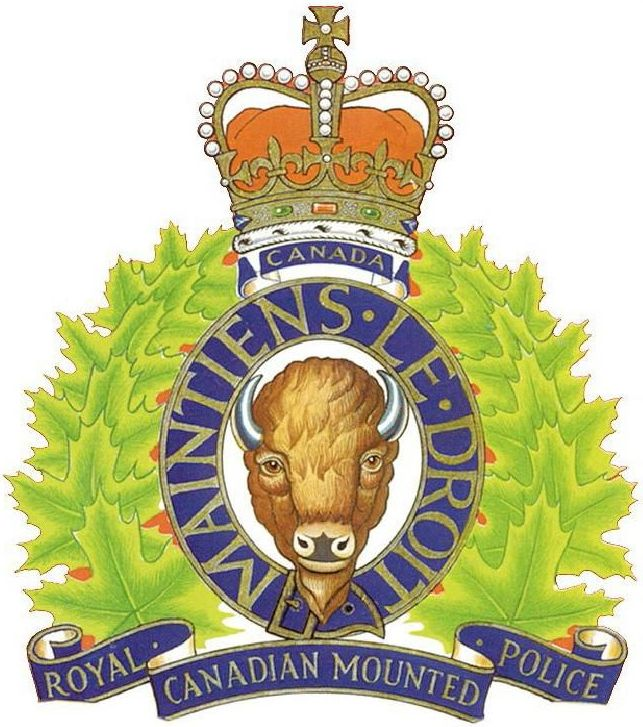
- Genre: Crime drama
- Created by: F. R. Crawley
- Starring: Gilles Pelletier; Don Francks; John Perkins
- Theme music composer: Bill McCauley
- Countries of origin: Canada; United Kingdom
- Original language: English
- No. of seasons: 1
- No. of episodes: 39

Production
- Executive producer: F. R. Crawley
- Producers: Harry Horner; Bernard Girard
- Running time: 30 mins.
- Production companies: Crawley Films; CBC; BBC; Australian Broadcasting Commission

Original release
- Network: CBC
- Release: 28 October 1959 – 19 October 1960

R.C.M.P. is a Canadian television drama series about the Royal Canadian Mounted Police. The series ran a single season, consisting of 39 weekly half-hour episodes that aired from 28 October 1959 to 19 October 1960 on CBC.

== Cast ==
The series starred French-Canadian actor Gilles Pelletier as Corporal Jacques Gagnier, who was in charge of the rural northern Shamattaw station. English-Canadian actor Don Francks played Constable Bill Mitchell, and American actor John Perkins played Constable Frank Scott.

Actors in supporting roles were Hugh Webster, Murray Westgate, Robert Christie, James Doohan, John Drainie, Katherine Blake, and Alfie Scopp. A nine-member indigenous family, from a grandmother to an infant, were flown in from the Hudson Bay area to appear in some episodes.

== Cooperation of Royal Canadian Mounted Police ==
The series had the cooperation of the Royal Canadian Mounted Police, and the producers were allowed access to their case files. Charles Rivett-Carnac, who had 36 years of active service before being appointed as RCMP commissioner, worked closely with the producers.

The RCMP cooperation came with the condition that the series stay close to the facts, and not romanticize the police force. RCMP regulations forbids its men to shoot without giving warning, or to manhandle anyone. Graeme Fraser, the vice president of Crawley Film Ltd, said that "American TV networks want a fast show, one in which there is a great deal of action and drama. We can get away with a slow show, one with less action, on Canadian, British or Australian TV, but we need the American market or we won't recoup our investment..." Fraser stated it was a problem to find a compromise between the limitations set by the RCMP and appealing to the U.S. television market.

Earl Rettig, the president of NBC division California National Productions, which syndicated R.C.M.P. in the United States, stated "Hollywood motion pictures and television producers for years have been negotiating in vain for a working agreement with the Royal Canadian Mounted Police. This is why CNP feels very fortunate in having secured rights to the series."

== Production ==
The series was created by Canadian film-maker Radford Crawley in collaboration with the Canadian Broadcasting Corporation, the BBC and the Australian Broadcasting Commission. It was shot on a new soundstage at Old Chelsea, a community of Chelsea, Quebec, and on location in Aylmer, Quebec and Outlook, Saskatchewan. The series took place in the fictional western Canadian town of Shamattawa, a Cree name meaning 'the meeting of the rivers'.

The main writers for the series were George Salverson, Munroe Scott and Vincent Tilsley of the BBC, who also acted as script editor. Music was composed by William McCauley. The CBC aired the series at a cost of $8,000 per episode, and the BBC paid $10,000 per episode.

The series had a budget of $1,400,000, and took a year to film. The producers bought an old airplane without wings, and mounted it in a field. When there wasn’t enough natural snow, snow was shoveled in front of the airplane’s engine to produce a blizzard effect. Special heaters were used outdoors to keep the cameras operating in freezing weather.

R.C.M.P. was realistic in portraying small-town Canadian life, and often had the look of a documentary. The series used the characters’ rural isolation, the changing weather conditions, and the cultural differences between whites and natives as focal points for episode stories.

Crawley had hoped to sell the series to a United States television network, and was disappointed with needing to settle for less profitable syndication status, but the American television networks weren't interested in buying a foreign series unless they were involved in its production. Though Crawley had hired Hollywood-based Bernard Girard as head of production, that did not satisfy the U.S. networks, who wanted more control over the series they broadcast, so the series was syndicated to United States television stations.

== Episodes ==
No.	Title	Directed by	Written by	Original release date
1	"Crash on 21"	Harry Horner	George Salverson	28 October 1959
Corporal Jacques Gagnier risks his life to help a man trapped in his overturned gasoline tanker.
2	"Poison Pen"	George Gorman	George Salverson	4 November 1959
An anonymous letter writer creates fear and distrust among the people of Shamattawa. Corporal Gagnier investigates.
3	"The Accused"	Harry Horner	George Salverson	11 November 1959
Constable Frank Scott is accused of assaulting one of Shamattawa’s leading citizens.
4	"Husband Trouble"	George Gorman	Vincent Tilsley	18 November 1959
Vera Cord’s evidence sent her husband to jail. Now he’s being released, and she fears revenge.
5	"The Ten-Mile Tombstone"	George Gorman	Vincent Tilsley	25 November 1959
Townspeople are suspicious when Stephen Ford buys an expensive headstone for his wife’s grave, because everyone knows she made his life miserable.
6	"David and Goliath"	Don Haldane	Munroe Scott	2 December 1959
Constable Mitchell disguises himself as a beatnik to convict a narcotics peddler.
7	"The Smiling People"	Bernard Girard	George Salverson	9 December 1959
An Eskimo woman is charged with murder, and a plane carrying the basic requirements for a British court hearing arrives at Seal Bay in the Arctic.
8	"The Safeman Cometh"	Harry Horner	George Salverson	16 December 1959
A safecracker has been working his way across Ontario, and Constable Mitchell states that the man will come to Shamattawa.
9	"Little Girl Lost"	Fergus McDonell	Vincent Tilsley	23 December 1959
Gerta and Bart are having marital problems, and are using their young daughter as a weapon against each other.
10	"The Replacement"	Bernard Girard	Bernard Girard	30 December 1959
While tracking a killer Corporal Gagnier becomes involved with the troubles of a murdered constable’s widow.
11	"Gunslinger"	George Gorman	Bernard Girard	6 January 1960
The teenage son of an abusive father wants a Wild West gunfight on the main street of Shamattawa at high noon.
12	"The Counterfeiter"	George Gorman	George Salverson	13 January 1960
When Allison Andrews comes to Shamattawa Corporal Gagnier receives a marriage proposal.
13	"Bad Medicine"	Don Haldane	George Salverson	20 January 1960
On patrol near Muskrat River Corporal Gagnier finds a man wanted for murder, who is traveling with his Native father-in-law who doesn't speak English. Gagnier must get both men to a RCMP detachment.
14	"Three Big Men"	Don Haldane	Vincent Tilsley	10 February 1960
Corporal Gagnier tries to find out why three gangsters have come to Shamattawa.
15	"Trackdown"	Fergus McDonell	George Salverson	17 February 1960
When Corporal Gagnier tries to locate a missing priest he discovers a murderer.
16	"Johnny Wolf"	Paul Almond	George Salverson	24 February 1960
Johnny Wolf’s father had been an artist and a war hero. Why had Johnny turned violent?
17	"The Marked Man"	Paul Almond	Munroe Scott	2 March 1960
The owner of a paper mill has had several bad accidents. Corporal Gagnier attempts to find out what’s happening at the mill.
18	"The Hunt"	George Gorman	Vincent Tilsley	16 March 1960
When Corporal Gagnier investigates the theft of a truck the investigation takes an unusual turn.
19	"Tourist Bait"	Harry Horner	Munroe Scott	23 March 1960
Well-armed bank robbers arrive in Shamattawa. They are looting the vault when Constable Scott walks into the bank.
20	"Moonshine"	Bernard Girard	Munroe Scott	30 March 1960
Constable Scott is sent to an Indian Reserve to investigate illegal alcohol and discovers a murder.
21	"The Extortionist"	Don Haldane	Vincent Tilsley	6 April 1960
Matthew Standing took the law into his own hands when an extortionist threatened his family. Corporal Gagnier knows one of the jury members at Standing’s trial is the extortionist.
22	"The Longest Week of the Year"	George Gorman	Bernard Girard	13 April 1960
A trapper is caught in a blizzard with a frozen foot. When his family report him missing Gagnier and Scott travel by dog sled to rescue him.
23	"Number Thirty Four"	George Gorman	Vincent Tilsley	20 April 1960
Jack Reardon is convinced everyone is against him and decides to protect himself with a rifle.
24	"Back to School"	George Gorman	Vincent Tilsley	27 April 1960
Corporal Gagnier attends a refresher training course in Ottawa. Before the course is over he is warned about breaking regulations.
25	"Target For the Law"	George Gorman	Munroe Scott	4 May 1960
A man whose wife plans to divorce him is threatened by the man she wants to marry. The husband is then found shot to death.
26	"Killer Instinct"	Don Haldane	George Salverson	11 May 1960
Dave Pickett, a paroled convict, is afraid his instinct to kill will overpower him again. His parole officer, Corporal Gagnier, tries to help.
27	"The Gentle Executioner"	George Gorman	George Salverson	18 May 1960
A case of arsenic poisoning comes to the attention of Corporal Gagnier.
28	"Day of Reckoning"	Fergus McDonell	Vincent Tilsley	25 May 1960
Ruth Hopwood is attacked on her way home and her family is sure Tony Fletcher is the guilty party, even though Ruth denies it. Her family threatens to take the law into their own hands when the RCMP won’t arrest Tony.
29	"Violence at the Wedding"	George Gorman	George Salverson	1 June 1960
A former suitor of the bride brings bootleg liquor to the wedding reception that Gagnier is attending.
30	"Battle of the Innocents"	Don Haldane	George Salverson	8 June 1960
When Boomer Jackson kills his wife Corporal Gagnier tries to arrest him.
31	"The Haystack Murder"	Bernard Girard	George Salverson	15 June 1960
A haystack catches fire and a charred body is found. Corporal Gagnier investigates and finds a second body.
32	"Thin Ice"	George Gorman	Vincent TIsley	13 June 1960
Gagnier and Scott go after bank robber Paul Donnelly. The trail leads them over a frozen lake.
33	"Storm O’Brien"	Bernard Girard	Munroe Scott	24 August 1960
Corporal Gagnier must perform an operation while a doctor gives instructions over the telephone.
34	"Breakout"	Don Haldane	Charles E. Israel	31 August 1960
Convict Pete Mallory breaks out of jail.
35	"The Third Question"	Bernard Girard	Charles W. Curran and Bernard Girard	14 September 1960
Money is missing from the church mission collection box, and a little boy can’t be found.
36	"Mop-Up"	George Gorman	Bernard Girard	21 September 1960
A typical day at the Shamattawa RCMP detachment — a stolen police car, a wife-beater, a lost car, bad checks, and bones under a bed.
37	"Shotgun Lady"	Don Haldane	George Salverson	5 October 1960
Elderly Ann Gowley welcomes all visitors by firing shots and hurling threats.
38	"The Rustler"	Paul Almond	George Salverson	12 October 1960
The cattle belt of Saskatchewan is plagued by cattle rustling.
39	"Piggy-Bank Robbery"	George Gorman	Alan Phillips	19 October 1960
Constable Scott wonders why a thief stole only a piggy bank from a wealthy family's home.

== Broadcast ==
The series aired on CBC in Canada, premiering on 28 October 1959, and airing its finale episode on 19 October 1960. In the United Kingdom, the series aired on BBC beginning in July 1960. In the United States the series aired in broadcast syndication.

R.C.M.P. was dubbed into the French, Spanish, Italian and German languages, and was broadcast in Argentina, the Philippines, Iran, Nigeria, Rhodesia, West Germany, Puerto Rico, New Zealand, Uruguay, Peru, Hong Kong, Belgium, Monaco, Luxembourg, and Venezuela.
