= The Disordered Mind =

- Genre: Documentary
- Directed by: Robert Anderson; Henwar Rodakiewicz
- Presented by: Robert Anderson
- Narrated by: H.B. Durost; Heinz Lehmann; Henry Kravitz
- Music by: Hugh Le Caine
- Country of origin: Canada
- Original language: English
- No. of seasons: 3
- No. of episodes: 12

Production
- Producer: Robert Anderson
- Cinematography: Doug Wilkinson; Robert Crone; Roger Moride
- Editors: Fergus McDonell; Don Evraire
- Running time: 30 minutes
- Production company: Robert Anderson Associates

Original release
- Network: CBC Television
- Release: 20 April 1960 – 2 October 1966

The Disordered Mind is a Canadian medical documentary television miniseries that aired sporadically on CBC Television in 1960, 1963 and 1966.

== Premise ==
The series concerned actual cases of mental illness, featuring the patients and practitioners involved in each case.

== Scheduling ==
=== First series ===
Wednesdays 10:30 p.m. (Eastern), part of Explorations

- 20 April 1960: "Psychosomatic Disorders: A Coronary" - an insurance agent suffers a stress-related heart attack.
- 27 April 1960: "Psychoneurotic Conditions: A Pathological Anxiety" - an office employee faces anxieties which impair a regular lifestyle.
- 4 May 1960: "Psychotic Conditions: A Depression" - a man afflicted with depression attempts a murder-suicide of his family.
- 11 May 1960: "Anti-Social Personality Disorders: A Psychopath" - a thief who lacks conscience.

=== Second series ===
Wednesdays 10:30 p.m. (Eastern), part of Explorations

- 20 February 1963: "Psychosomatic Conditions: Obesity" (1963) - the treatment of a young girl's obesity.
- 27 February 1963: "The Obsessive-Compulsive Neurosis" featured a subject with obsessive–compulsive disorder who remained unemployed for five years due to this condition.
- 6 March 1963: "Psychotic Conditions: Paranoid Schizophrenia" featured a person with paranoid schizophrenia who has resumed normal employment after overcoming that condition.
- 20 March 1963: "The Compulsive Car Thief" featured a young adult who is serving a prison sentence for car thefts, a practice which began at age ten.

=== Third series ===
Sundays 10:30 p.m. (Eastern), stand-alone series

- 11 September 1966: "Aggressive Child" - features a combative six-year-old boy.
- 18 September 1966: "Girl in Danger" - concerns a 13-year-old girl who is emotionally less than half her age and deemed "pre-delinquent".
- 25 September 1966: "Bright Boy, Bad Scholar" - features learning disorders and their early therapy.
- 2 October 1966: "Afraid of School" - concerns a six-year-old boy who avoids school due to an incident during infancy.
