= Private Information =

1952 film

- Original British quad poster
- Directed by: Fergus McDonell
- Screenplay by: Gordon Glennon; John Baines; Ronald Kinnoch
- Based on: play Garden City by Gordon Glennon
- Produced by: Ronald Kinnoch
- Starring: Jill Esmond; Jack Watling; Gerard Heinz; Carol Marsh
- Cinematography: Eric Cross
- Edited by: Tom Simpson
- Music by: H.M. Farrar
- Production company: ACT Films
- Distributed by: Monarch Film Corporation
- Release date: 1 May 1952
- Running time: 65 minutes
- Country: United Kingdom
- Language: English

Private Information is a 1952 British second feature ('B') drama film directed by Fergus McDonell and starring Jill Esmond, Jack Watling and Carol Marsh. The screenplay was by Gordon Glennon, John Baines and Ronald Kinnoch.

== Synopsis ==
A woman battles against corruption in her local council.

== Cast ==
- Jill Esmond as Charlotte Carson
- Jack Watling as Hugh Carson
- Carol Marsh as Georgie Carson
- Gerard Heinz as Alex
- Mercy Haystead as Iris Freemantle
- Norman Shelley as Herbert Freemantle
- Lloyd Pearson as Mayor George Carson
- Henry Caine as Forrester
- Brenda de Banzie as Dolly Carson

== Production ==
It was made at Walton Studios.

== Critical reception ==
The Monthly Film Bulletin wrote: "This film, adapted from a play and thoroughly stagey in treatment, fails with its setting – which never seems real – and with its over melodramatic choice of incidents. An exposé of administrative corruption must seem to have at least a basis of probability. Though the film is a degree better than the second A.C.T. production, Night Was Our Friend, one feels that this company, formed by film technicians themselves, should be able to produce something more worthwhile."

Kine Weekly wrote: "The picture means well, but it goes to such lengths to blacken the wealthy and the influential that its epidemic climax, resulting from bad drainage, can be smelt some time before the end. Yet, despite its ingenuousness and lack of surprises it definitely has its moments. These are generally attributed to Jill Esmond's forthright and uninhibited performance."

Picturegoer wrote: "Sincere and forthright British small-town melodrama, this "B" picture aims a straight left at corrupt officials and building contractors. ... Jill Esmond does a good job as Charlotte – her performance prevents propaganda from getting the better of straight drama. I think you'll find the film both stimulating and holding, though you do not have to be a sanitary inspector to anticipate the epidemic finale."

In British Sound Films: The Studio Years 1928–1959 David Quinlan rated the film as "mediocre", writing: "Sincerity of intention not enough; film is badly acted and boring."

It was one of 15 films selected by Steve Chibnall and Brian McFarlane in The British 'B' Film, as among the most meritorious of the B films made in Britain between World War II and 1970. They noted that it "develops its issue with the venalities of local government and sub-standard housing in calm and sufficient detail to establish its seriousness of purpose", which was "skillfully interwoven with the elements of personal drama". They added that "the screenplay seems to have been worked on with rather more care than was routinely the case with B films". They also praised the "carefully observed performance" by Jill Esmond, "a fine, undervalued stage actress".

== External ==
- Private Information at IMDb
