= Fergus McDonell =

English film editor and director (1910–1984)

- Born: 6 October 1910; Ticehurst, East Sussex
- Died: 3 January 1984 (aged 73); Norwich, Norfolk
- Occupations: Film editor and director
- Years active: 1937-1974

Fergus McDonell (6 October 1910 – 3 January 1984) was an English film editor and director. He was nominated for the Academy Award for Best Film Editing for Odd Man Out (1947), and his film The Hideout (aka The Small Voice) received a nomination for Best British Film at the 1949 BAFTA Awards.

== Early life ==
Fergus McDonell was one of five children born to Angus MacDonnell, Judge of Trichonopoly, Madras and his wife Elsie Murdoch. His grandfather was Lord Aeneas Ranald MacDonell, 19th Chief of Clan MacDonell of Glengarry. Members of this family variously spell their surname 'MacDonnell', 'Macdonnell' and 'McDonell'; Fergus used the latter spelling throughout his life.

As was the custom among members of the Indian Civil Service during the Raj, it is likely that McDonell spent his early childhood in India and was sent back to England for his education. His brother Angus died at age two; he and his three other brothers attended Sedbergh School in Cumbria.

== Career ==
In 1937, McDonell entered the film world as an editor on The Claydon Treasure Mystery, one of a series of B movies or 'Quota Quickies' which he would make between 1937 and 1950. Quota Quickies were a response to the protectionist Cinematograph Films Act 1927, which was intended to limit Hollywood imports and ensure that a healthy percentage of films screened in British cinemas were of British origin. American producers got around it by setting up shell companies in the UK to make low-budget films, often shot on two-week schedules. Their quality was so poor that it was not unusual for theatre owners to apologize to their customers, in advance. These 'B' films did not intend to be serious but they offered a springboard for talent, and a way for filmmakers to hone their craft.

The films that McDonnel worked on, however, were of a better quality; his last B movie, Private Information (1952), was one of 15 films selected by Steve Chibnall and Brian McFarlane in their book The British 'B' Film, as among the most meritorious of the British B films made in Britain between World War II and 1970. Chibnall and McFarlane praise McDonell's "sensitive regard for human relationships and for the ways in which the pressure of circumstance highlights aspects of character", and they note that he "had a knack for obtaining striking performances from his leading ladies".

Private Information was the third film McDonell directed; by now, he was accomplished enough as an editor that Carol Reed's 1947 film Odd Man Out garnered McDonell an Academy Award nomination for the Best Film Editing. The first film he directed, 1948's The Hideout (also released as The Small Voice) received a nomination for Best British Film at the 1949 BAFTA Awards.

McDonell's achievements caught the attention of the National Film Board of Canada and he was offered a job. In 1951, he moved to Ottawa and became an NFB editor. As an editor, he worked on 84 documentaries and short films; he became an NFB director in 1956 and made 38 films.

In 1959, McDonell left the NFB to take the job of directing some of the episodes of the CBC series R.C.M.P.. He was simultaneously working on four episodes of a 12-film psychiatric series by his NFB colleague Robert Anderson called The Disordered Mind, which would also air on the CBC. He made two additional psychiatric films for Anderson and Geigy Pharmaceuticals, returned to the NFB as editor on two documentaries and, in 1961, moved back to England.

McDonell would not direct again, but he would act as editor of another 17 films, including the wildly popular What's New Pussycat? (1962). That was followed by, among others, The Caretaker, 1965's Four in the Morning (which would win Judi Dench the 1966 BAFTA Award for Most Promising Newcomer), Stephen Frears first film Gumshoe (1971) and the critically acclaimed Khartoum (1966). His last film was Terence Donovan's Yellow Dog; he retired in 1974.

== Personal life and death ==
In 1931, McDonell married Wendy Hamblin. They had three children, including the producer and editor Robin Murdoch McDonell. Fergus McDonnel died in Norfolk in 1984, at age 74.

== Filmography ==
- The Claydon Treasure Mystery - feature, Manning Haynes 1938 - editor
- I Met a Murderer - feature, Roy Kellino 1939 - editor
- Asking for Trouble - feature, Oswald Mitchell 1942 - editor
- The Dummy Talks - feature, Oswald Mitchell 1943 - co-editor with Jack Harris
- On Approval - feature, Clive Brook 1944 - editor
- The Way Ahead - feature, Carol Reed 1944 - editor
- The Way to the Stars, aka Johnny in the Clouds - feature, Anthony Asquith and Charles Saunders 1945 - editor
- Odd Man Out - feature, Carol Reed 1947 - editor
- The Small Voice aka The Hideout - feature, 1948 - director
- Prelude to Fame - feature, 1950 - director
- Private Information - feature, 1952 - director
- L'Homme à l'âge de la machine – short film, Donald Peters 1956 - editor
- Back Into the Sun - documentary short, Perspective series 1956 - director
- Borderline - documentary short, Perspective series 1957 - director
- Capital City - documentary short, Perspective series 1957 - director
- Double Verdict - short film, Perspective series 1957 - director
- The Happy Fugitive - short film, Perspective series 1957 - director
- Train 406 - documentary short, Perspective series 1958 - director
- Western Brigade - documentary short, Perspective series 1958 - director
- R.C.M.P. - Little Girl Lost - series episode 1959 - director
- R.C.M.P. - Day of Reckoning - series episode 1960 - director
- R.C.M.P. - Trackdown - series episode 1960 - director
- The Medical Use of Hypnosis - documentary short, Robert Anderson 1960 - editor
- Voices in Space - documentary short, Robert Anderson 1960 - editor
- New North: Part 2. New Patterns in Flight - documentary short, Robert Anderson 1960 - editor
- Man's Adaptability to Cold (Polar People) - documentary short, Robert Anderson 1960 - editor
- Faces of Depression - documentary short, Robert Anderson 1960 - editor
- Pathological Anxiety - documentary short, Robert Anderson 1960 - editor
- The Disordered Mind: "Psychosomatic Disorders: A Coronary" - documentary short, Robert Anderson 1960 - editor
- The Disordered Mind: "Psychoneurotic Conditions: A Pathological Anxiety" - documentary short, Robert Anderson 1960 - editor
- The Disordered Mind: "Psychotic Conditions: A Depression" - documentary short, Robert Anderson and Henwar Rodakiewicz 1960 - editor
- The Disordered Mind: "Anti-Social Personality Disorders: A Psychopath" - documentary short, Robert Anderson 1960 - editor
- Emotional Factors in General Practice - documentary short, Robert Anderson 1960 - editor
- They Took Us to the Sea - documentary short, John Krish 1961 - editor
- Some People - feature, Clive Donner 1962 - editor
- The Caretaker aka The Guest - feature, Clive Donner 1963 - editor
- Nothing but the Best - feature, Clive Donner 1964 - editor
- Four in the Morning - feature, Anthony Simmons 1965 - editor
- What's New Pussycat? - feature, Clive Donner 1965 - editor
- The Three Musketeers - TV series, 10 episodes, Peter Hammond 1966 - editor
- Khartoum - feature, Basil Dearden 1966 - editor
- Only When I Larf - feature, Basil Dearden 1966 - editor
- Charlie Bubbles - feature, Albert Finney 1968 - editor
- Here We Go Round the Mulberry Bush - feature, Clive Donner 1968 - editor
- Alfred the Great - feature, Clive Donner 1969 - editor
- Spring and Port Wine - feature, Peter Hammond 1970 - editor
- Unman, Wittering and Zigo - feature, John Mackenzie 1971 - editor
- Gumshoe - feature, Stephen Frears 1971 - supervising editor
- Mistress Pamela - feature, Jim O'Connolly 1973 - supervising editor
- Yellow Dog - feature, Terence Donovan 1973 - editor

National Film Board of Canada

Editor, Director

- Canada's Atom Goes to Work - documentary short, Roger Blais 1952 - editor
- Beyond the Frontier - documentary short, Ronald Dick 1952 - editor
- Singing Champions - documentary short, Roger Blais 1952 - co-editor with Arshad Mirza
- The Mountain Movers - documentary short, Ron Weyman 1952 - editor
- Citizen Varek - documentary short, Gordon Burwash 1953 - editor
- Les deux pieds sur terre - documentary short, Larry Gosnell 1953 - editor
- Canada at the Coronation - documentary, Allen Stark 1953 - co-editor with Eldon Rathburn and Kenneth Heeley-Ray
- The Harbour - documentary short, Ernest Kirkpatrick 1953 - editor
- The Newcomers - documentary short, David Bennett 1953 - co-editor with Douglas Tunstall
- Farewell Oak Street - documentary short, Grant McLean 1953 - editor
- The Ballot-o-Maniac - documentary short, Stanley Jackson 1953 - editor
- Let's Talk About Films - documentary short, Julian Biggs 1953 - editor
- In Search of Home - documentary short, Ron Weyman 1953 - editor
- Mission Ship - documentary short, Robert Anderson 1953 - editor
- Inland Seaport - documentary short, Roger Blais 1953 - editor
- Man Is a Universe - documentary short, Ron Weyman 1954 - editor
- Bottleneck - documentary short, Leslie McFarlane 1954 - editor
- The War on Want - documentary short, Gordon Burwash 1954 - editor
- Vigil in the North - documentary short, 1954 - editor, director
- College in the Wilds - documentary short, Julian Biggs 1954 - editor
- Frontier College - documentary short, Julian Biggs 1954 - editor
- Men at Work - documentary short, Donald Peters 1954 - editor
- Diggers of the Deeps - documentary short, Grant McLean 1954 - editor
- High Tide in Newfoundland - documentary short, Grant McLean 1954 - co-editor with Marion Meadows
- British Empire and Commonwealth Games - documentary short, Jack Olsen 1954 - editor
- The Curlers - documentary short, William Davidson 1955 - editor
- Prairie Profile - documentary short, Gordon Burwash 1955 - editor
- Problem Clinic - documentary short, Ron Weyman 1955 - editor
- Road of Iron - documentary, Walford Hewitson 1955 - editor
- The Dikes - documentary short, Roger Blais 1955 - editor
- In This Dark World - documentary short, Jean Lenauer 1955 - editor
- Strike in Town - documentary short, Leslie McFarlane 1955 - editor
- The Shepherd - documentary short, Julian Biggs 1955 - editor
- The Pony - short film, Lawrence Cherry 1955 - editor
- Airwomen - documentary short, Ian MacNeill 1956 - editor
- L'homme à l'âge de la machine - documentary short, Donald Peters 1956 - editor
- Stress - documentary short, Ian MacNeill 1956 - editor
- Operation Life Saver - documentary short, Isobel Kehoe 1956 - editor
- Frontiers to Guard - documentary short, Ian MacNeill 1956 - editor
- Are People Sheep? - documentary short, Julian Biggs 1956 - editor
- Crash Rescue and Firefighting - documentary short, 1956 - editor, director
- Train 406 - documentary short, 1956 - editor, director
- Back into the Sun - documentary short, 1956 - director
- Methods of Instruction - documentary short, 1956 - director
- Morning Incident - documentary short, 1956 - director
- The Nativity Cycle - documentary short, 1956 - director
- The Cage - short film, 1956 - director
- The Longer Trail - short film, 1956 - director
- The Yellow Leaf - short film, 1956 - director
- Borderline - documentary short, 1957 - director
- Double Verdict - documentary short, 1957 - director
- Capital City - documentary short, 1957 - director
- Flagged for Action - documentary short, 1957 - director
- Test Pilot -short film, 1957 - director
- The Two Kingstons - documentary short, 1957 - director
- The Happy Fugitive - short film, 1957 - director
- The Street - short film, 1957 - director
- None but the Lonely - short film, 1957 - director
- The Harvest - short film, 1957 - director
- The Ticket - documentary short, 1958 - director
- Western Brigade - documentary short, 1958 - director
- Un héritage, une tradition, une marine - documentary short, Kirk Jones 1960 - editor
- An Enduring Tradition - documentary, Kirk Jones 1960 - editor
- Canada's Navy - documentary short, Kirk Jones 1962 - editor
