= Paul Desbaillets =

Canadian restaurateur

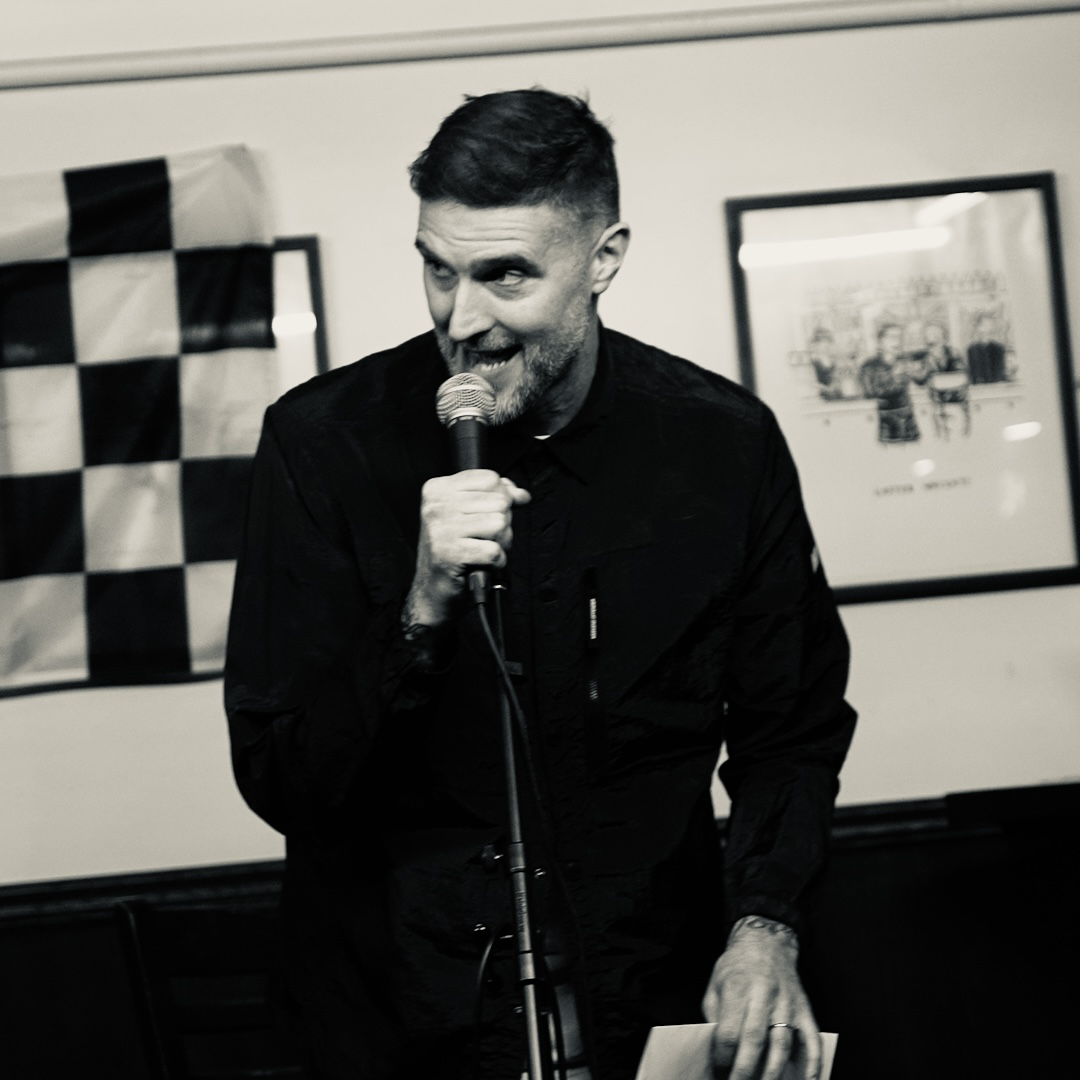
- Desbaillets in 2023
- Education: Concordia University (BFA)
- Occupations: Restaurateur; Entrepreneur; Sports Media Personality

Paul Desbaillets is a Canadian entrepreneur, restaurateur and football media personality. He is the creator and host of The 1st Half, a football culture media platform, and serves as Chief Brand Officer of Canadian Premier League club FC Supra du Québec. He is also the founder of the GOAL Initiatives Foundation and a co-founder of the Burgundy Lion Group in Montreal.

== Biography ==
=== Early life ===
Desbaillets is the grandson of French Canadian radio and television personality Jacques DesBaillets. He got his start in the restaurateur business when he was 18 years old as a busboy.

=== Career ===
Hospitality and entrepreneurship

As a co-founder and partner in the Burgundy Lion Group, Desbaillets is behind some of the most popular establishments in Montréal. His first venture, Burgundy Lion, opened in 2008 and redefined the public perception of what a pub in Montréal could be. It became known for its simple but impressive wine and cocktail list and a level of service that had not yet been seen in Montréal's pub culture. The Lion was able to maintain the balance or exceptional food and service while remaining a pub at its core. In 2010, Burgundy Lion Group expanded and opened the first Quebec inspired Fish n’ Chips shop in the world, the now renowned Brit & Chips. They have since added Pub Bishop & Bagg, Wolf & Workman gastropub, and RBHC Catering to their business portfolio. Desbaillets is also a member of the Nouvelle Association des Bars du Québec.

Football and media

Desbaillets is the host and creator of The 1st Half Podcast, a podcast dedicated to all aspects of the game of football (soccer). During the COVID-19 pandemic, he was the host of the official MLS CF Montréal podcast and also produced a few 'Football & Food' shorts for the American group ONE37, Gary Vaynerchuk's digital media company. He is the football culture editor of Cult MTL, an arts, culture, and news website and print publication based in Montréal.

In March 2024, The 1st Half partnered with TSN Radio 690 Montreal to launch a weekly radio show focused on soccer and football culture. The program features discussions and interviews with guests from Montreal and internationally. It airs every Friday night from 6 to 7pm on TSN and iHeartRadio.

In 2026, Desbaillets joined FC Supra du Québec as Chief Branding Officer ahead of the club's inaugural Canadian Premier League season. In an interview with BBC Sport, Desbaillets described the club's brand identity as rooted in Quebec's multicultural character and local pride.

During the 2026 FIFA World Cup, Desbaillets provided media commentary on Canadian soccer and football culture, including an appearance on CTV News Montreal ahead of Canada's match against Morocco. He also covered the tournament's cultural impact in his work for Cult MTL, where he serves as contributing editor for football culture.

Desbaillets has also consulted on football-related projects with Labatt Brewing Company, Carlsberg, Molson, Ricardo Cavolo, Secret Walls, MURAL Festival, and Paris Saint-Germain F.C.

=== Philanthropy ===
The year after the football-screening Burgundy Lion opened, Desbaillets started the GOAL Tournament, now known as Goal MTL. Goal MTL is a charity football tournament organized yearly that features a who’s who of Montreal’s bar, restaurant, and hospitality scene. Since its beginnings in 2010, the football tournament has raised more than $350,000 for local charities that run youth-oriented programs.

Desbaillets founded the GOAL Initiatives Foundation in 2019, a national Canada Revenue Agency registered charity focused on cultural development, mental health and wellness, and youth sports programming. The organization promotes access to safe spaces for sport and play, regardless of age, race, gender, or sexual orientation. GOAL Initiatives has organized events and programs supporting community organizations and youth access to sport.

In 2012, Desbaillets received the Queen Elizabeth II Diamond Jubilee Medal. In 2025, Desbaillets received the King Charles III Coronation Medal.
