= The Claydon Treasure Mystery =

1938 British film by Manning Haynes

- Directed by: Manning Haynes
- Written by: Edward Dryhurst
- Based on: novel The Shakespeare Murders by Neil Gordon
- Produced by: John Findlay
- Starring: John Stuart; Garry Marsh; Annie Esmond
- Cinematography: Stanley Grant
- Edited by: Fergus McDonell
- Production company: Fox-British Pictures
- Distributed by: Twentieth Century Fox Film Company (UK)
- Release date: 5 September 1938 (UK)
- Running time: 63 minutes
- Country: United Kingdom
- Language: English

The Claydon Treasure Mystery is a 1938 British crime drama film directed by H. Manning Haynes and starring John Stuart, Garry Marsh and Evelyn Ankers. Murder at a large old manor house attracts the attentions of a mystery writer. It was made at Wembley Studios as a quota quickie by the British subsidiary of 20th Century Fox.

== Plot ==
Lady Caroline invites engineer and part-time crime writer Peter Kerrigan to Marsh Manor to solve a murder. Is the mysterious death of a librarian connected with the Claydon treasure, reputedly hidden on the estate a century earlier?

== Cast ==
- John Stuart as Peter Kerrigan
- Garry Marsh as Sir George Ilford
- Evelyn Ankers as Rosemary Shackleford
- Annie Esmond as Lady Caroline Claydon
- Campbell Gullan as Tollemache
- Aubrey Mallalieu as Lord Claydon
- Finlay Currie as Rubin
- Joss Ambler as Inspector Fleming
- Vernon Harris as Rhodes, the Butler

== Bibliography ==
- Chibnall, Steve. Quota Quickies: The Birth of the British 'B' Film. British Film Institute, 2007.
- Low, Rachael. Filmmaking in 1930s Britain. George Allen & Unwin, 1985.
- Wood, Linda. British Films, 1927-1939. British Film Institute, 1986.
