= A Little Fellow from Gambo =

1970 Canadian film

A Little Fellow from Gambo: The Joey Smallwood Story
- Directed by: Julian Biggs
- Written by: Julian Biggs
- Produced by: Julian Biggs
- Starring: Joey Smallwood
- Narrated by: Budd Knapp
- Cinematography: Paul Leach
- Edited by: Bud Neate; Ken Page (sound)
- Music by: Eldon Rathburn
- Production company: National Film Board of Canada
- Release date: 1970
- Running time: 56 minutes
- Country: Canada
- Language: English

A Little Fellow from Gambo: The Joey Smallwood Story is a 1970 documentary film directed by Julian Biggs for the National Film Board of Canada in 1970.

The film is a lively portrait of Joey Smallwood, the first premier of Newfoundland and Labrador, a controversial and powerful politician who became known as the "last living Father of Confederation" for his role in negotiating the admission of Newfoundland and Labrador as a Canadian province in 1949. Following Smallwood during a two-and-a-half-month period that included a stormy Liberal leadership convention, the film reveals a man misunderstood even by his close associates.

The film, which was screened at the 1971 Stratford Film Festival, won three Canadian Film Awards at the 22nd Canadian Film Awards, for Best Public Affairs Film, Best Direction in a Non-Feature (Biggs) and Best Actor in a Non-Feature (Smallwood).

The choice of Smallwood, who was simply being himself in a documentary film, as the recipient of an acting award was justified by the award organizers on the grounds that Smallwood's flamboyant and charismatic personality made him a "distinguished natural actor".
