= 23 Skidoo (film) =

1964 film

- Title card
- Directed by: Julian Biggs
- Produced by: Guy Glover (exec.); Julian Biggs
- Cinematography: Paul Leach
- Edited by: Julian Biggs; Kathleen Shannon
- Production company: National Film Board of Canada
- Release date: 1964
- Running time: 8 minutes
- Country: Canada

23 Skidoo is a 1964 short experimental black-and-white film directed by Julian Biggs and produced by the National Film Board of Canada.

== Synopsis ==
Its central images are "eerie" and "disturbing" scenes of downtown Montreal devoid of people. The film offers no explanation for what happened to the people until a scene in a newsroom where we glimpse a never-completed report about the explosion of the first neutron bomb.

== Accolades ==
In 1965, the film was nominated for a BAFTA Award for Best Short Film. Also at the 1965 BAFTAs, it was nominated for the United Nations Award for "the best Film embodying one or more of the principles of the United Nations Charter in 1965" (Dr. Strangelove won the award). 23 Skidoo won "Special Mention" in the international competition at the 1965 Kraków Film Festival that year.

== See also ==
- Arthur Lipsett - another NFB filmmaker similar in content
- The Cold War
