= Drug Addict (film) =

1948 film by Robert Anderson

- Directed by: Robert Anderson
- Written by: Robert Anderson
- Produced by: Robert Anderson
- Narrated by: John Scott
- Cinematography: Jean-Marie Couture
- Edited by: Victor Jobin
- Music by: Robert Fleming
- Production company: National Film Board of Canada
- Distributed by: National Film Board of Canada
- Release date: 1948
- Running time: 34 minutes
- Country: Canada
- Language: English

Drug Addict is a 1948 documentary made by Robert Anderson for the National Film Board of Canada. It is the only Canadian film that remains banned in the United States.

== Synopsis ==
The film traces the strange progress of illicit narcotics and illustrates how the drug addict is created, and the relationship between addict and pusher. It also suggests how the grim social reality may be curbed.

Its main themes are that addicts are from all races and classes, that most traffickers are white, that law enforcement only targets low-level dealers, that there is little difference between addiction to legal and illegal drugs, that cocaine is not necessarily addictive, that drug addicts are not violent, that law-enforcement control of it is impossible, and that drug addiction is a sickness.

== Production ==
Drug Addict was originally intended to be a training film for law enforcement personnel, social workers, and medical professionals; Anderson wrote it in 1947 with the assistance of Health and Welfare Canada and R.C.M.P. Commissioner Leonard Nicholson. For research, he followed Vancouver-area R.C.M.P., watching them kick in doors, arrest dealers, and burn a poppy field. He shot most of the film in New York: in Harlem, Chinatown, and the port shipyards. He finished shooting in Montreal, using street addicts as actors.

== The United States Ban of Drug Addict ==
The release of Drug Addict heartened Alfred R. Lindesmith, an Indiana University sociology professor who advocated the medical treatment of drug addiction. In 1940, he published the article Dope Fiend Mythology, in which he criticized the media’s use of stereotypes such as ‘freak’ and ‘dope fiend’, and stated that drug addicts are normal human beings with an illness, and that punitive actions against them are unreasonable.

Drug Addict outraged Harry J. Anslinger, the ‘moral enforcer’ who was head of the Federal Bureau of Narcotics (FBN) from 1930 to 1962. The early 20th-century mass migration of minorities to northern U.S. cities, and the emergence of an illicit narcotics market, had created public anxiety and suspicion directed at immigrants and people of color. Anslinger, who had a hard-line drug policy, and who had the support of Democrats, Republicans, the Women's Christian Temperance Union, and many churches, exploited these fears by linking drugs to minorities. As he also controlled licensing for the importation of opiates, he had the support of drug companies. He also controlled the flow of information about drugs and drug addiction; as late as the 1950s, the intimidation of the FBN made it difficult to publish books on drugs or drug use.

Beginning in 1939, Anslinger directly targeted Alfred Lindesmith with a campaign of intimidation, slander, and guilt-by-association. He attempted to intimidate Indiana University, he formally called Lindesmith a ‘drug addict’, a ‘crackpot’, and a ‘communist’. It is believed that the FBN tapped Lindesmith's phone and planted, or attempted to plant, drugs in his house and car.

Lindesmith, who initially had no support from his peers, viewed Drug Addict as the opening of a window, a significant aid in affecting American perceptions of drug use and addiction, and an opportunity to end prohibitionist policies. Drug Addict depicts addicts as desperate, pathetic, and sick individuals, suffering from guilt and withdrawal—it was a direct rebuttal to the rationale for Anslinger's policies. Anslinger knew of the potential political hazards that the film could foster if the public was presented with such a rebuttal, particularly one produced with the assistance of a government as credible as Canada's, and its national police force. He saw the film as a threat to the existence of the FBN.

When Lindesmith traveled to Ottawa to view the film and attend a United Nations reception for it, Anslinger had the American Ambassador to Canada request that Lindesmith not be allowed to see the film. The Canadian government declined the request. Anslinger asked that the Canadian government not distribute the film in the United States and that it censor the film within its own borders; the Canadians rejected the request. He then had the film banned in the United States and requested that the Canadian government ban it in Canada; that request was refused.

While the two men wrote competing New York Times editorials, Anslinger falsely claimed that the film had been banned under the Motion Picture Association code. The Women's Christian Temperance Union pressured Lindesmith to stop his campaign; Anslinger tried to involve J. Edgar Hoover. But Indiana University had stood behind Lindesmith; eventually, after years of being harassed themselves, physicians and lawyers sided with him. The American Bar Association, the American Medical Association, and Indiana University formed a committee to study drug addiction and, in 1961, published a report, edited by Lindesmith, called Drug Addiction – Crime or Disease. Anslinger tried to stop its publication. His superiors told him to cease his campaign against Lindesmith; when he did not, he was scrutinized for insubordination, and in 1962, he was forced to resign. Technically, Drug Addict remains banned in the United States.

== Awards ==
- 1st Canadian Film Awards, Ottawa: Best Non-Theatrical, Live-Action (Documentary), 1949
- 3rd British Academy Film Awards, London: Nominee: BAFTA Award for Best Documentary, 1950
