= Guy Glover =

Canadian film producer (1910–1988)

Guy Glover (November 5, 1910 – May 17, 1988) was a senior National Film Board of Canada (NFB) producer and administrator who was born in London, U.K. and died in Hudson, Canada.

== Career ==
Guy Glover's career as an NFB senior producer and administrator spanned more than 35 years and more than 200 films. His family immigrated from England in 1913, and as a young man studied at the University of British Columbia. He co-founded the Progressive Arts Club of Vancouver and in 1936 participated in a production of Waiting for Lefty, which played Vancouver and was invited to the Dominion Drama Festival in Ottawa. A chance meeting with Norman McLaren back in London, England, in 1937 changed the course of his professional and personal life.

The pair relocated to New York City in 1939 then in 1941, Film Commissioner John Grierson invited both McLaren and Glover to join the fledgling NFB. By 1945 the bilingual Glover was put in charge of a small group of French-Canadian filmmakers then working in the Ottawa studios of the Board. In 1952 he wrote and narrated the Academy Award-nominated animated short, The Romance of Transportation in Canada. He was the producer on 50 episodes of the series Window of Canada, hosted by Clyde Gilmour, and in 1956 he was appointed the producer on the Board's French-language television unit, a position he held until 1958. Four of the films he produced or served as executive producer were nominated for Academy Awards: The Fight: Science against Cancer, Herring Hunt, The Stratford Adventure and Caroline Leaf's The Street.

A poet, actor and theatre director, Glover was the director of the Canadian Ballet Festival Association. He was the lifelong partner of Norman McLaren, whom he met at the ballet in London in 1937.

== Films and awards as producer include ==
- Lining the Blues, 1939 (animated)
- Listen to the Prairies, 1945 (executive producer)
- Challenge: Science against Cancer, 1950 (producer)
- The Fight: Science against Cancer, 1951 (producer); Canadian Film Award -Special Award; Academy Award nomination – Short Subjects
- The Bird Fancier (L'Homme aux oiseaux), 1952 (producer)
- The Settler (L'Abatis), 1952 (producer)
- Opera School, 1952 (producer); Canadian Film Award – Theatrical Short
- Herring Hunt, 1953 (executive producer); Academy Award nomination – Short Documentary
- Farewell Oak Street, 1953 (executive producer); Canadian Film Award - Theatrical Short
- The Stratford Adventure, 1954 (producer); Canadian Film Award – Film of the Year, Feature Film; Academy Award nomination – Short Documentary
- Les Brûlés, 1958 (co-producer)
- River with a Problem, 1961 (executive producer)
- Morning on the Lièvre, 1961 (executive producer); Canadian Film Award – Theatrical Short
- Lewis Mumford on the City, 1963 (executive producer, six films)
- Bethune, 1964 (executive producer)
- 23 Skidoo, 1964 (executive producer)
- Angel, 1966 (producer); Canadian Film Award – Arts and Experimental
- Never a Backward Step, 1966 (producer); Canadian Film Award – Feature Documentary
- Fluxes, 1967
- The Street, 1976 (producer); Canadian Film Award – Animated Short; Academy Award nomination – Animated Short; Ottawa International Animation Festival – Grand Prize
- Poets on Film, 1977 (producer, three films)
