= On the Spot (Canadian TV program) =

1953 Canadian TV program

- Created by: Bernard Devlin
- Presented by: Fred Davis; Robert Anderson; Lloyd Bochner; Austin Willis
- Country of origin: Canada
- No. of seasons: 3
- No. of episodes: 66

Production
- Executive producer: Robert Anderson
- Running time: 13–30 minutes
- Production company: National Film Board of Canada

Original release
- Network: CBC
- Release: October 6, 1953 – June 30, 1955

Related
- Perspective

On the Spot is the first program made specifically for television by the National Film Board of Canada, and aired on CBC Television from 1953 to 1955. Each episode reported on a different aspect of life in Canada and was introduced with the line "The National Film Board’s up-to-the-minute report of what’s happening somewhere in Canada”. The program was originated by Bernard Devlin, with Robert Anderson as executive producer.

The program debuted on October 6, 1953, at 7:45 pm and ran until June 30, 1955, for a total of 66 episodes. Episodes were from 13 to 30 minutes, with the CBC running one or two in one time slot. It changed time slots frequently, playing as late as 11:45 pm on Monday nights before going to Sundays at 4:30 pm. The second season aired on Sundays at 10 pm. Cancelled after the 15th episode of the third season, On the Spot was replaced by Perspective, a 30-minute program that mixed documentary reports and dramatisations of contemporary Canadian issues.

Episodes included "Survival in the Bush", with producer Robert Anderson, acting as host, apparently dropped off in northern Quebec armed with just an axe; "The Dresden Story", looking at racism in a small Ontario town, where the town's white and black populations insisted on being filmed separately; and "Artist in Montreal", written and directed by Jean Palardy, looking at the Automatistes movement.

"Transpacific Flight" involved an account of a flight across the Pacific Ocean in 1953, based on first-person interviews of the flight crew by Fred Davis. Another aviation-themed episode was Radar Station (1953). The documentary involved an account of a visit to a radar station while it was involved in a simulated air attack and was based on first-person interviews, by RCAF Squadron Leader Bill Lee, of the station's staff.

One episode that was cancelled was "Backstage at Parliament", on the workings of the Canadian Parliament, with a mock session with actual members of Parliament. When the film was shown to the Prime Minister's Office, there were complaints about showing a session of Parliament without including the PM and the NFB was forced to shelve the episode.

The episode "Alcoholism" won the Frigon Trophy for Best Canadian Television Programme on Film at the 1957 Gala Radiomonde et Télémonde.

== Regards sur le Canada ==
Three On the Spot episodes were produced in French: "Alcoholism" ("L'alcoolisme, est-ce une maladie?"), "Artists in Montreal" ("Artiste à Montréal") and "Better Business Bureau". Devlin and Anderson then produced a French series for Quebec, Regards sur le Canada. 39 half-hour episodes of Regards sur le Canada aired on Radio-Canada from late 1953 through 1955. It was not new programming; this series was a combination of previously released, market-appropriate documentaries and episodes of Eye Witness.

== Episodes ==
Air dates are unavailable.

=== 1953 ===
Title	Director	Producer	Length
The Winnipeg Story	Bernard Devlin	Bernard Devlin	14:34 min.
Winnipeg Ballet	Bernard Devlin	Bernard Devlin	15 min.
Oil	Bernard Devlin	Bernard Devlin	15 min.
Transpacific Flight	Bernard Devlin	Bernard Devlin	15 min.
It's Raining Soldiers!	Bernard Devlin	Bernard Devlin	15 min.
Football Story	Bernard Devlin	Bernard Devlin	15 min.
Hotel Story	Bernard Devlin	Bernard Devlin	13 min.
The Zoo in Stanley Park	Bernard Devlin	Bernard Devlin	14:47 min.
The Mounties' Crime Lab	Bernard Devlin	Bernard Devlin	15 min.
Saskatchewan Farm Museum	Bernard Devlin	Bernard Devlin	15 min.
Radar Station	Allen Stark	Allen Stark	15 min.

=== 1954 ===
Title	Director	Producer	Length
School for Charm	Bernard Devlin	Allen Stark	30 min.
Dresden Story	Julian Biggs	Grant McLean; Julian Biggs; Gordon Burwash	30 min.
Story of a Newspaper	Julian Biggs	Bernard Devlin	14:12 min.
Laurentian Skiing	Allen Stark	Bernard Devlin	15 min.
Test Pilot	Allen Stark	Bernard Devlin	15 min.
The Strong Man	Bernard Devlin	Bernard Devlin	15 min.
Threshermen’s Reunion	Rollo Gamble	Robert Anderson	30 min.
Survival in the Bush	Bernard Devlin	Robert Anderson	30 min.
The Traffic Cop	Jack Olsen	Bernard Devlin	15 min.
Javanese Dancing	Bernard Devlin	Julian Biggs	15 min.
On Leave in Tokyo	Bernard Devlin	Bernard Devlin	15 min.
Police Club for Boys	Allen Stark	Bernard Devlin	15 min.
Artist in Montreal	Jean Palardy	Robert Anderson	30 min.
Hidden Power	John Feeney	Allen Stark	30 min.
Movies in the Mill	Allen Stark	Bernard Devlin	15 min.
Judo - Jinks	Bernard Devlin	Bernard Devlin	15 min.
Chinese Canadians	Allen Stark	Robert Anderson	30 min.
Food and Drug Patrol	Allen Stark	Allen Stark	30 min.
Korea, After the War	Bernard Devlin	Bernard Devlin	15 min.
Aviation Medicine	Julian Biggs	Bernard Devlin	15 min.
End of Tour	Bernard Devlin	Bernard Devlin	15 min.
Auto Production	John Spotton	Allen Stark	15 min.
Chosen Children	Bernard Devlin	Bernard Devlin	15 min.
Workshop for Science	Gordon Burwash; Grant McLean	Gordon Burwash; Grant McLean	30 min.
Better Business Bureau	Bernard Devlin	Bernard Devlin	15 min.
Camera Men	Allen Stark	Bernard Devlin	15 min.
The Magnificent	Julian Biggs	Robert Anderson	30 min.
How to Climb a Mountain	Walford Hewitson	Robert Anderson	30 min.
The Doll Factory	Julian Biggs	Bernard Devlin	15 min.
Deep Sleep	Jack Olsen	Bernard Devlin	15 min.
The Car Mart	Walford Hewitson	Bernard Devlin	15 min.
Cancer Clinic	Allen Stark	Bernard Devlin	15 min.
Bureau of Missing Persons	Bernard Devlin	Allen Stark	30 min.
Curtain Time in Ottawa	Bernard Devlin	Bernard Devlin	14:21 min.
Harness Racing	Bernard Devlin	Bernard Devlin	15 min.
French Cuisine	Bernard Devlin	Bernard Devlin	15 min.
The Magic Men	Jack Olsen	Bernard Devlin	15 min.
Micro Movies	Bernard Devlin	Bernard Devlin	15 min.
Montreal Fire Department	Allen Stark	Allen Stark	15 min.
Vancouver's Chinatown	Bernard Devlin	Bernard Devlin	15 min.

=== 1955 ===
Title	Director	Producer	Length
Christmas Comes Twice	Gordon Burwash; Grant McLean	Gordon Burwash; Grant McLean	30 min.
Routine Flight	Gordon Burwash; Grant McLean	Gordon Burwash; Grant McLean	30 min.
Trends in Textiles	Rollo Gamble	Allen Stark	30 min.
Vertical Flight	Grant McLean	Grant McLean	30 min.
Two Countries, One Street	Jean Palardy	Robert Anderson	30 min.
Maritime Montage	Julian Biggs; Rollo Gamble	Robert Anderson	30 min.
Lunenburg - Home of the Bluenose	Ernest Reid	Robert Anderson	30 min.
Gold Rush Land	Allen Stark	Robert Anderson	30 min.
Food Facts	John Feeney	Allen Stark	30 min.
Prairie University	John Feeney	Robert Anderson	30 min.
Forest Wardens	Allen Stark	Allen Stark	30 min.
Backstage at Parliament	Don Haldane	Allen Stark	30 min.
Child Guidance Clinic	Don Haldane	Allen Stark	30 min.
Alcoholism	Don Haldane	Allen Stark	30 min.
Career College	Rollo Gamble	Allen Stark	30 min.
