= Munroe Scott =

Canadian writer

Munroe Scott (1927 – September 15, 2019) was a Canadian freelance writer based in Lindsay, Ontario.

Scott was born in Owen Sound, Ontario in 1927. He received a BA from Queen's University and an MA degree from Cornell University. From 1950 to 1957 he worked as a writer for Crawley Films in Ottawa. He has been freelance since 1957 writing for the NFB, CBC, Carillon Films (Holland), Berkeley Studio (United Church of Canada), and others. Best known as the biographer of Dr. Robert Baird McClure, Scott has also written for the stage and his plays have premiered at Toronto's St.Lawrence Centre, Hamilton's Theatre Aquarius, and Lindsay's Kawartha Summer Theatre. Scott wrote the Sound & Light Show for Parliament Hill, 1984–93. His television writing/directing includes two thirteen part series comprising the memoirs of two Canadian prime ministers, First Person Singular (The Pearson Memoirs) and One Canadian (The Diefenbaker Memoirs). He was also writer/director for five parts of the eight hour CBC TV series The Tenth Decade (The Diefenbaker Pearson Years). His affection for Ottawa's Parliament Hill culminated in The Carving of Canada, a fully illustrated book paying tribute to artists who have interpreted Canada in stone and glass in the very heart of the Centre Block. (Photography by Ian D. Scott)

Scott died on September 15, 2019, at the age of 92.

== Published works ==
- Waltz for a pagan drum. Tri-M, 1988
- McClure: The China Years. CANEC, Penguin, 1977, 1979
- Always an Updraft – a writer remembers. Manotick, ON: Penumbra Press, 2005.
- The Liberators. Manotick, ON: Penumbra Press, 2001.
- The Carving of Canada – a tale of parliamentary gothic. Manotick, ON: Penumbra Press, 1999.
- McClure: Years of Challenge. Toronto: CANEC, 1977; Penguin Canada, 1979.
- Wu-feng Toronto: Simon & Pierre, 1974.
