= Bernard Devlin (director) =

Canadian film director (1923–1983)

- Born: Joseph Bernard Devlin; 2 September 1923; Quebec City, Quebec, Canada
- Died: 1 January 1983 (aged 59); Montreal, Quebec, Canada
- Occupations: Film director Film producer Screenwriter
- Years active: 1946–1977

Joseph Bernard Devlin (2 September 1923 – 1 January 1983) was a French-Canadian film director, producer, and writer who played an important role in the development of French-language film production at the National Film Board of Canada (NFB).

== Biography ==
Devlin was born and raised in Quebec City. After attending Loyola College, he joined the Royal Canadian Navy and saw action in the Atlantic, the Mediterranean and North Africa. After the war, he moved to Ottawa and joined the NFB. He was one of the few French-Canadians there; he joined Vincent Paquette and Jean Palardy and, after the war, the NFB hired Roger Blais and Raymond Garceau, among others.

This group made French films, but it also continued to make English films, and dub them for Quebec. In 1951, the NFB created a studio for the creation of French-language films. Devlin wasn't given a title, but he was put in charge of the unit and spent the next two years producing films about French-Canadian culture. While he was reportedly an anti-nationalist, he did a great deal to further French-Canadian film production at the NFB.

In 1953, the NFB produced its first television series, which ran for two years on the CBC. It was called On the Spot and it was a series of short documentaries, 39 of which were directed and/or produced by Devlin.

In 1954, Devlin was seconded by Radio-Canada to help establish French-language television programming and spent the next five years creating Sur le vif (On the Spot). These were NFB-produced films for the CBC; the difference was that there were no dubbed versions of English films and no duplications of subject matter. They were original films, in French, for French-Canadians.

Devlin returned to the National Film Board in 1959, directing French-language television programs, and was director of French production again from 1960 to 1961. In 1971, he was given the one-year appointment of Director of English Production. He spent the latter years of his career creating English-language films and retired in 1977. He died in Montreal in 1983, at age 59.

== Filmography ==
- Ski Skill - documentary short, 1946 - co-writer with Sydney Newman, co-director with Roger Blais
- Vive le ski! - documentary short, 1946 - co-writer with Roger Blais and Georges Ayotte, co-director with Roger Blais
- Ici...Ottawa - documentary short, 1946 - writer, director
- Vers l'avenir - documentary short, 1947 - director
- Horizons de Québec - documentary short, 1948 - writer, director
- Double Heritage - documentary short, 1948 - director
- Abitibi - documentary short, David Bairstow 1949 - writer
- A Capital Plan - documentary short, 1949 - director
- French Canada: 1534-1848 - documentary short, 1950 - director
- Local 100 - short film, 1950 - writer, director
- St. Lawrence Coaster - documentary short, Denys Gagnon 1951 - editor
- Ottawa: Today and Tomorrow - documentary short, 1951 - director
- The Sexton - documentary short, Raymond Garceau 1952 - producer
- Seven Islands - documentary short, Gil LaRoche 1952 - producer
- The Puppeteers - documentary short, Jacques Giraldeau 1952 - producer
- The Bird Fancier - short film, 1952 - co-director with Jean Palardy
- The Settler (L'Abatis) - documentary short, 1952 - writer, co-director with Raymond Garceau
- Winter Week-end - short film, 1952 - director
- Backstage - documentary short, 1953 - producer
- Tempest in Town - short film, Raymond Garceau 1953 - producer
- The Motorman - documentary short, Gil LaRoche 1953 - producer
- Music Professor - documentary short, Gil LaRoche 1953 - producer
- The Village Notary - short film, Pierre Arbour 1953 - producer
- The Wind-Swept Isles - documentary short, Jean Palardy 1953 - producer
- Ti-Jean Goes Lumbering - short film, Jean Palardy 1953 - executive producer
- On the Spot: Transpacific Flight - documentary short, 1953 - producer
- On the Spot: Football Story - documentary short, 1953 - producer, director
- On the Spot: Hotel Story - documentary short, 1953 - producer, director
- On the Spot: Winnipeg Ballet - documentary short, 1953 - producer
- On the Spot: The Winnipeg Story - documentary short, 1953 - producer
- On the Spot: Oil - documentary short, 1953 - producer, director
- On the Spot: Saskatchewan Farm Museum Story - documentary short, 1953 - producer, director
- On the Spot: It's Raining Soldiers! - documentary short, 1953 - producer, director
- On the Spot: The Mounties' Crime Lab - documentary short, 1953 - editor, producer, director
- On the Spot: The Zoo in Stanley Park- documentary short, 1953 - producer, director
- On the Spot: School for Charm - documentary short, 1954 - writer, director
- On the Spot: Aviation Medicine - documentary short, 1954 - producer
- On the Spot: The Strong Man - documentary short, Julian Biggs 1954 - producer
- On the Spot: Story of a Newspaper - documentary short, Julian Biggs 1954 - producer
- On the Spot: The Doll Factory - documentary short, Julian Biggs 1954 - producer
- On the Spot: Better Business Bureau - documentary short, 1954 - producer, director
- On the Spot: Bureau of Missing Persons - documentary short, 1954 -director
- On the Spot: Chosen Children - documentary short, 1954 -producer, director
- On the Spot: Curtain Time in Ottawa - documentary short, 1954 - producer, director
- On the Spot: French Cuisine - documentary short, 1954 -producer, director
- On the Spot: Harness Racing - documentary short, 1954 - producer, director
- On the Spot: Javanese Dancing - documentary short, 1954 - director
- On the Spot: Judo - Jinks - documentary short, 1954 - editor, producer, director
- On the Spot: Korea, After the War - documentary short, 1954 - producer, director
- On the Spot: Movies in the Mill - documentary short, Allen Stark 1954 - producer
- On the Spot: Cancer Clinic - documentary short, Allen Stark 1954 - producer
- On the Spot: The Magic Men - documentary short, Jack Olsen 1954 - producer
- On the Spot: End of Tour - documentary short, 1954 - producer
- On the Spot: Camera Men - documentary short, Allen Stark 1954 - producer
- On the Spot: Police Club for Boys - documentary short, Allen Stark 1954 - producer
- On the Spot: Test Pilot - documentary short, Allen Stark 1954 - producer
- On the Spot: Deep Sleep - documentary short, Jack Olsen 1954 - producer
- On the Spot: The Traffic Cop - documentary short, Jack Olsen 1954 - producer
- On the Spot: Micro Movies - documentary short, 1954 - producer, director
- On the Spot: On Leave in Tokyo - documentary short, 1954 - producer, director
- On the Spot: Survival in the Bush - documentary short, 1954 - director
- On the Spot: The Car Mart - documentary short, Walford Hewitson 1954 - producer
- On the Spot: Laurentian Skiing - documentary short, Allen Stark 1954 - producer
- On the Spot: Vancouver's Chinatown - documentary short, 1954 - producer, director
- Men at Work - short film, Donald Peters, 1954 - producer
- Window on Canada No. 26 - documentary short, 1954 - producer
- Saint-Jean - documentary short, Gil LaRoche 1954 - producer
- L'abbé Pierre - documentary short, 1954 - director, co-producer with Robert Anderson
- L'or de l'Abitibi - documentary short, 1954 - producer, director
- Le prospecteur - documentary short, 1954 - producer, director
- Les Polonais du Canada - documentary short, 1954 - director, co-producer with Robert Anderson
- La Coupe du bois en Colombie-Britannique - short film, Gil LaRoche 1954 - producer
- Dorval et Gander - short film, Gil LaRoche 1954 - producer
- La Fabrication du papier - short film, Gil LaRoche 1954 - producer
- Regards sur le Canada Numbers 1-39 - documentary shorts, 1954 - producer, co-director with Robert Anderson
- Reliques indiennes - documentary short, Gil LaRoche 1954 - producer
- Saint-Pierre-et-Miquelon - short film, Gil LaRoche 1954 - producer
- Trappeur indien - documentary short, 1955 - writer, producer, director
- Pour survivre en forêt - documentary short, 1955 - director
- L'Alpinisme - short film, Rollo Gamble 1955 - writer
- Le 22e régiment en Allemagne - documentary short, 1955 - writer, director
- Boîte de nuit - documentary short, 1955 - producer, director
- Le chauffard - documentary short, 1955 - director
- Circulation à Montréal - documentary short, 1955 - writer, director
- L'élevage dans l'Ouest - short film, Rollo Gamble 1955 - writer
- La crèche d'Youville - documentary short, 1955 - producer, director
- New Hearts for Old - documentary short, 1955 - co-director with Jean Lenauer
- Le Colon - documentary short, 1955 - producer, director
- Les canadiens français dans l'Ouest - documentary short, 1955 - director
- Nos aviateurs outre-mer - documentary short, 1955 - director
- Quartier chinois - documentary short, 1955 - director
- Radio Police - documentary short, 1955 - director
- Retour à Dieppe - documentary short, 1955 - producer, director
- Aéro-Club - documentary short, 1956 - director
- Raw Material - documentary short, 1956 - director
- Alfred J. - documentary, 1956 - director
- Case of Conscience - short film, 1956 - director
- D'homme à homme - short film, 1956 - director
- Il s'enfla si bien - short film, 1956 - director
- Le cas Labrecque - short film, 1956 - director
- Le vieux bien - short film, 1956 - director
- Night Children - documentary short, Perspective series 1956 - director
- L'Homme à l'âge de la machine - short film, Donald Peters 1956 - producer
- Que Dieu vous soit en aide - short film, 1956 - director
- The Visit - short film, 1956 - director
- Tu enfanteras dans la joie - short film, 1956 - director
- Les nouveaux venus - short film, 1957 - director
- The Suspects - short film, Perspective series 1957 - director
- Les Brûlés, 1-8 - short films, 1957 - writer, director (released as The Promised Land in 1962)
- Rendezvous - documentary short, 1958 - director
- Age of Dissent: Young Men with Opinions - documentary, 1959 - director, co-producer with Ian MacNeill
- Britain and Canada Debate Britain's World Leadership - documentary, 1959 - co-producer with Ian MacNeill, co-director with Richard Gilbert
- L'immigré - short film, 1959 - director
- L'Héritage - short film, 1960 - director, co-writer with Léonard Forest
- Walk Down Any Street - short film, 1960 - writer, director
- Dubois et fils - short film, 1961 - co-director with Raymond Leboursier
- Alexis Ladoceur, Métis - documentary short, Raymond Garceau 1961 - co-producer with Victor Jobin
- The Niger, Young Republic - documentary, Claude Jutra 1961 - producer
- The Promised Land - feature, 1962 - writer, director
- Les Bacheliers de la cinquième - documentary short, Clément Perron and François Séguillon 1962 - co-producer with Victor Jobin
- The Gold Seekers - documentary short, Robert Russell 1962 - co-producer with Victor Jobin
- The Lake Man - documentary short, Raymond Garceau 1962 - co-producer with Victor Jobin
- Loisirs - documentary short, Clément Perron and Pierre Patry 1962 - co-producer with Victor Jobin
- Adultes avec réserve (Boulevard Saint-Laurent) - documentary short, Jack Zolov and Marc Beaudet 1962 - co-producer with Victor Jobin
- September Five at Saint-Henri - documentary short, Hubert Aquin 1962 - cinematographer
- Louis-Hippolyte Lafontaine - short film, Pierre Patry 1962 - producer
- David Thompson: The Great Mapmaker - short film, 1964 - director
- The Voyageurs - documentary short 1964 - producer, director
- The Correctional Process - documentary, 1964 - writer, director
- Blindness - short film, Morten Parker 1964 - co-writer with Edmund Reid and Wilson Southam
- The Visit - documentary short, John Kemeny 1964 - producer
- Octopus Hunt - documentary short, 1965 - director
- Once Upon a Prime Time - short film, 1966 - director
- Pre-Release - documentary short, 1966 - writer, director
- A Question of Identity: War of 1812 - short film, 1966 - producer, director
- Judoka - documentary short, Josef Reeve 1967 - co-producer with David Bairstow
- Seniority Versus Ability - documentary short, 1968 - director
- A Matter of Survival - documentary short, 1969 - editor, director
- Below Zero - documentary short, Michel Régnier 1970 - co-writer with William Weintraub
- The End of the Nancy J - short film, 1970 - writer, producer, director
- A Case of Eggs, Episodes 1-4 - short films, 1974 - writer, director
- Striker - short film, Robert Nichol 1976 - co-producer with Israel Hicks
- Nature's Food Chain - documentary short, 1977 - editor, co-producer and -director with André Petrowski

== Awards ==
Ski Skill (1946)

- Ski Club Festival, Sestriere, Italy: First Place, Ski Club Cup, 1951
- International Sports Film Festival, Cortina d'Ampezzo, Italy: Bronze Medal, 1951

The Settler (1952)

- International Festival of the Agricultural Film, Rome: Second Prize, Education for Farmers, 1953
- 6th Canadian Film Awards, Montreal: Honourable Mention - Theatrical Short, 1954
- Golden Reel International Film Festival, Film Council of America, Chicago: Recognition of Merit, 1954

The Bird Fancier (1952)

- 5th Canadian Film Awards, Montreal: Best Theatrical Short, 1953

Ti-Jean Goes Lumbering (1953)

- Yorkton Film Festival, Yorkton, Saskatchewan: Honourable Mention, 1954
- Okanagan Film Festival, Kelowna, British Columbia: First Prize, Children’s Films, 1958

Alfred J. (1956)

- International Labour Film Festival, Vienna: Second Prize, 1957

Walk Down Any Street (1960)

- Philippines Film Festival on Mental Health, Manila: Plaque of Merit, 1965

The Niger, Young Republic (1961)

- Festival dei Popoli, Florence, Italy: Special Jury Prize, 1961

Octopus Hunt (1965)

- Electronic, Nuclear and Teleradio Cinematographic Review, Rome: Gold Rocket, Sports Films 1968

A Matter of Survival (1969)

- American Film and Video Festival, New York: Blue Ribbon, 1970
- International Labour and Industrial Film Festival, Antwerp: Selection Committee Award, 1971
- International Labour and Industrial Film Festival, Antwerp: Director's Award, 1971
- International Labour and Industrial Film Festival, Antwerp: Award of Excellence, 1971
- Industrial Film Awards, New York: Best in Category: Industrial Photography, 1971

Nature's Food Chain (1977)

- American Film and Video Festival, New York: Red Ribbon, Nature and Wildlife, 1979
