= Fred Davis (broadcaster) =

Canadian broadcaster (1921–1996)

- Davis in 1956
- Born: 10 August 1921; Toronto, Ontario, Canada
- Died: 5 July 1996 (aged 74); Toronto, Ontario, Canada
- Education: Lorne Greene Academy of Radio Arts
- Years active: 1946–1995
- Spouse(s): Joy Carroll (c. 1986) four previous marriages

Fred Davis (10 August 1921 – 5 July 1996) was a Canadian broadcaster, best known as host of the CBC Television programme Front Page Challenge for nearly all of its 38-year run.

Born in Toronto, he became a trumpet player in his youth who performed at various concerts, particularly with the bands of Art Hallman and Howard Cable. At one point he was conductor of the Teentime Orchestra at CFRB radio. After serving in World War II, including performing in the Canadian Band of the Supreme Headquarters Allied Expeditionary Force under the direction of Robert Farnon, he returned to Toronto to study broadcasting at Lorne Greene Academy of Radio Arts.

His early radio career included Ottawa station CFRA from late 1946.

In the early 1950s, Davis moved to television, as one of the hosts of the 1953-1954 documentary series On the Spot.

He began hosting the news-themed television quiz show Front Page Challenge in 1957, replacing host Alex Barris with whom the series began that summer. He remained host until the series was cancelled in 1995. He hosted commercials and other series during his career, although his primary work remained with Front Page Challenge.

== Death ==
Davis died age 74 at St. Michael's Hospital in Toronto following multiple strokes, leaving his fifth wife Joy Carroll Davis and five children (two sons and three daughters) from his earlier marriages.
