= Don Haldane =

Donald Alexander Haldane (December 3, 1914 – September 21, 2008) was a Canadian film and television director, most noted as the director of the films Nikki: Wild Dog of the North and Drylanders.

== Background ==
Born in Edmonton, Alberta, and raised in the small town of Olds, he was raised principally by his mother after his father returned from military service in the First World War suffering from severe shell shock. After having acted in school drama productions in high school he trained as a teacher before going to Yale Drama School in the late 1930s to study theatre direction. After returning to Canada he began working as a theatre director in Montreal, where after befriending Bill Trott, a Black Canadian tailor, he helped Trott to establish the Negro Theatre Guild, the city's first Black theatre company.

He enlisted in the Canadian Army in 1942 to serve in World War II, but spent his entire military career posted to CFB Borden without ever being shipped overseas to fight. He then returned to the United States to study filmmaking in New York City, and made a number of sponsored advertising films there before returning to Canada in 1954 to begin his long association with the National Film Board of Canada.

== Career ==
He directed a large number of films for the NFB, including the On the Spot and Perspective series, and established the Westminster Films studio with partners Lee Gordon (his wife) and Roy Krost. Associated primarily with documentary films in his early career, he got his first chance to direct a feature film when Westminster Films partnered with Disney on Nikki: Wild Dog of the North, and directed Drylanders for the NFB the following year. With both the NFB and Westminster, he continued throughout his career to work on documentaries, feature films and television productions.

He was a five-time Canadian Film Award winner for his work, receiving awards at the 8th Canadian Film Awards in 1956 for Saskatchewan Traveller, at the 12th Canadian Film Awards in 1960 for Bad Medicine, at the 16th Canadian Film Awards in 1964 for Land on the Move, at the 21st Canadian Film Awards in 1969 for Rye on the Rocks, and at the 23rd Canadian Film Awards in 1971 for Shebandowan: A Summer Place.

In 2003 he was awarded the Directors Guild of Canada's Distinguished Service Award for his lifetime contributions to Canadian filmmaking. The award was later renamed the Don Haldane Distinguished Service Award in his honour.

== Filmography ==
=== Films ===
- Alcoholism – 1955
- Backstage at Parliament – 1955
- Child Guidance Clinic – 1955
- Coal at the Crossroads – 1955
- Canadians Abroad – 1956
- Case of Conscience – 1956
- Curtain at Noon – 1956
- Elder Citizen – 1956
- Embassy – 1956
- Fighter Wing – 1956
- Is It a Woman's World? – 1956
- Night Shift – 1956
- Railroad Town – 1956
- Saskatchewan Traveller – 1956
- Ship in Harbour – 1956
- Win, Place or Show – 1956
- Crossroads – 1957
- Fires of Envy – 1957
- The Ghost that Talked – 1957
- Howard – 1957
- Joe and Roxy – 1957
- Who Is Sylvia? – 1957
- The Whole World Over – 1957 (co-director with Léonard Forest)
- Mystery in the Kitchen – 1958
- Eternal Children – 1959
- The Gifted Ones – 1959
- U.N. in the Classroom – 1959
- Nikki: Wild Dog of the North – 1961
- Drylanders – 1962
- Political Dynamite – 1962
- The Reincarnate – 1971

=== Television ===
- R.C.M.P – 1959, eight episodes
- The Forest Rangers – 1963, 16 episodes
- The Collaborators – 1974, one episode
- Dirty Sally – 1974, one episode
- Swiss Family Robinson – 1976, one episode
- Sidestreet – 1976, one episode
- For the Record – 1977–78, three episodes
- Ritter's Cove – 1980–81, six episodes
- The Campbells – 1985, four episodes
- The Beachcombers – 1985, one episode
- The Edison Twins – 1985–86, eight episodes
- The Way We Are – 1988
