= Jean Palardy =

French-Canadian artist (1905–1991)

Jean Palardy OC GOQ (1905 – November 28, 1991) was a French-Canadian painter, art historian, ethnologist and filmmaker.

== Biography ==
Born in Fitchburg, Massachusetts, Palardy moved with his family to Canada as a child in 1908, one of eight children. He was educated at Collège Saint-Laurent and the séminaire de Sainte-Thérèse, before studying at the École des Beaux-Arts de Montréal. He married painter Jori Smith in 1930.

Palardy and Smith were both members of the League for Social Reconstruction, with his interest in French Canadian rural life influenced by his political beliefs. Artist Jack Humphrey stayed with Palardy and his wife, Jori Smith, while living briefly in Montreal, with the three of them in poverty, supporting themselves during the winter of 1933 by painting matchboxes.

He was responsible for the interior design of the Hôtel Le Chantecler in Quebec's Laurentian region in 1939.

He joined the National Film Board of Canada (NFB) in 1941 and over 19 years directed a number of short films there including The Rising Tide, which was nominated for the Academy Award for Documentary Short Subject at the 22nd Academy Awards.

In 1963, he wrote his influential book on French Canadian design, Les Meubles anciens du Canada français, for which he received a grant from the Canada Council.

Palardy consulted on the restoration of the vessel Grande Hermine as well as that of the Fortress of Louisbourg. In 1975, he started restorations on the Jacques Cartier house. He also consulted for number of museums including the château Ramezay, McCord Museum, Musée national des beaux-arts du Québec and the David M. Stewart Museum.

His paintings are in the collections of the Montreal Museum of Fine Arts and elsewhere.

== Filmography ==
=== as director ===
- 1947 - Métropole
- 1949 - The Rising Tide
- 1951 - Oyster Man
- 1951 - The Wind-Swept Isles (Îles-de-la-Madeleine)
- 1952 - The Bird Fancier (L'Homme aux oiseaux)
- 1954 - Sorel
- 1954 - Bush Doctor
- 1954 - Artist in Montreal (On the Spot series)
- 1955 - Two Countries, One Street
- 1955 - Soirée de chantiers
- 1955 - The Lumberjack
- 1955 - Eye Witness No. 71
- 1955 - Chantier coopératif
- 1956 - Designed for Living
- 1956 - Agronomy
- 1957 - Carnival in Quebec
- 1958 - Trans Canada Summer
- 1959 - Correlieu

=== as screenwriter ===
- 1949 Le Gros Bill
- 1954 Sorel
- 1954 Bush Doctor
- 1955 Soirée de chantiers

=== as cinematographer ===
- 1955 Soirée de chantiers
- 1955 Eye Witness No. 71

=== as producer ===
- 1955 Soirée de chantiers

== Honours ==
- Officer, Order of Canada (1967)
- Certificate of merit, Canadian Historical Association (1975)
- Grand Officier, National Order of Quebec (1992, posthumously)
