= Joe Koenig =

Canadian entrepreneur (born 1930)

Joseph (Joe) Koenig
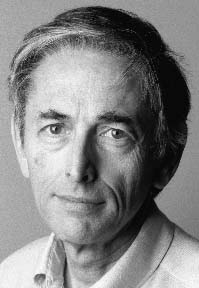
- Born: August 14, 1930 (age 95); Dresden, Germany
- Occupations: Producer, Director; Chairman Electronics Workbench

Joseph (Joe) Koenig (born August 14, 1930) is a Canadian filmmaker and entrepreneur who was the founder and president of Electronics Workbench.

== Biography ==
Koenig was born in Dresden, Germany; his family fled Nazi Germany in 1937, emigrating to Canada and settling on a 145-acre (0.59 km^{2}) farm along the Grand River, outside what is now known as Cambridge, Ontario.

His older brother Wolf Koenig was also a filmmaker.

== National Film Board of Canada ==
Koenig began his career as a filmmaker in 1956 at the National Film Board of Canada (NFB). He directed and/or produced 52 films, including Cosmic Zoom, Christopher's Movie Matinée and The Rise and Fall of the Great Lakes. Among his numerous honours, he won two BAFTA awards, for Energy and Matter (1966) and The Rise and Fall of the Great Lakes (1968).

== International Cinemedia Center Productions ==
He left the NFB in 1971 and, with colleagues John Kemeny, George Kaczender and Don Duprey, formed International Cinemedia Center Productions, where he produced educational films and animated content for clients in Canada and the United States, including the celebrated educator Caleb Gattegno.

== Interactive Image Technologies ==
In 1978, International Cinemedia became Alliance Communications (which would become Alliance Atlantis). Koenig left the firm, moved from Montreal to Toronto in and founded Interactive Image Technologies. At the NFB, he had become keenly interested in using multimedia as an educational tool, and focused on producing and distributed educational animated and interactive content and videos. In 1992, the Ontario Government modified its high school curriculum to require the teaching of electronics. A call for proposals to provide a simulation software package to meet the required learning outcomes was issued, and Koenig's company was awarded the contract.

In 1995, Koenig became embroiled in a copyright lawsuit that gained international attention. He sued the operator of a website that distributed illegal copies of his software through a bulletin-board and was successful in his lawsuit, which was filed in the UK.

One of the main challenges faced by early versions of Electronics Workbench, was the reluctance of educators to use simulation software as part of their electronics curriculum. In the early 1990s, there was considerable opposition among the electronics education community regarding the use of simulation software for the delivery of electronics curriculum. Many educators felt that a "hands on" methodology was the only valid method of learning electronics, and that simulation was a less-effective substitute.

In 1996, Koenig approached best-selling author Dr. Colin Simpson, with the idea of integrating his simulation software with Simpson's book Principles of Electronics and to offer an Electronics technician program where the entire learning outcomes for laboratory projects would be achieved with simulation. Simpson and Koenig embarked on a series of lectures, conference presentations and meetings with accrediting organizations throughout 1996, where they demonstrated that electronics simulation software could achieve identical results to laboratory experiments performed with real equipment.

The partnership between Koenig and Simpson led to the creation of the Electronics Technician distance education program, which became the largest electronics program in the world. The program won a National Award in 1998, and established Electronics Workbench as a leading educational resource.

In 1999, Koenig oversaw the acquisition of Ultimate Technology Inc. (UTI) located in the Netherlands. The integration of Multisim with UTI's printed circuit board (PCB) layout and design, transformed Koenig's company into a global electronic design automation (EDA) company with an installed base of over 150,000 customers.

== Later years ==
By the year 2000, Koenig's vision of laboratory simulation software in every school was largely realized and he began to take a more passive role in the strategic planning and day-to-day operation of his company. He announced his retirement as chief executive officer in 2003, and in 2005, Koenig sold his company to National Instruments.

An area of the Jalynn Bennett Amphitheatre, which opened in late May 2023 at Trent University's Catherine Parr Traill College, in Peterborough, Ontario, originally to have been called the "President's Booth," was named "Joe's Place," in Koenig's honour, following a donation by his daughter Anne.

== Filmography ==
National Film Board of Canada

- Radiation - documentary short, Hugh O'Connor 1959 - writer
- Life and Radiation - documentary short, Hugh O'Connor 1960 - writer
- The Tiny Terrors - documentary short, 1960 - writer and director
- Interview with Linus Pauling - documentary, 1960 - director
- The Real Story of Radar - documentary short, 1961 writer and director
- Mathematics at Your Fingertips - documentary short, John Howe 1961 - producer
- The Climates of North America - documentary short, 1962 - writer and director
- The Origins of Weather animated short, 1963 - writer and director
- Jet Pilot - documentary short, 1964 director
- Every Second Car - documentary short, Rex Tasker & Patricia Burwash 1964 - producer
- The Rideau: Colonel By's Peaceable Waterway - documentary short, Marc Champion 1964 - producer
- Animal Altruism - documentary short, Arthur Lipsett 1965 - producer
- Animals and Psychology - documentary short, Arthur Lipsett 1965 - producer
- Fear and Horror - documentary short, Arthur Lipsett 1965 - producer
- Perceptual Learning - documentary short, Arthur Lipsett 1965 - producer
- The Puzzle of Pain - documentary short, Arthur Lipsett 1965 - producer
- You Don't Back Down - documentary short, Don Owen 1965 - producer
- The Cruise - animated short, John Hubley & Faith Hubley 1966 - producer
- Change in the Maritimes - documentary short, Robin Spry 1966 - producer
- Change in the Western Mountains - documentary short, 1966 - producer and director
- The Changing Wheat Belt - documentary short, 1966 - producer and director
- Bird of Passage - documentary short, Martin Defalco 1966 - producer
- Energy and Matter - animated short, Robert Verrall 1966 - producer
- The Ever-Changing Lowlands - documentary short, Tony Ianzelo 1966 - producer
- Restricted Dogs - documentary short, Henry Zemel 1966 - producer
- Imperial Sunset - documentary short, Josef Reeve 1967 - producer
- Unstructured for a Summer - documentary short, Shelagh Mackenzie 1967 - producer
- A Search for Learning - documentary short, Donald Shebib 1967 - producer
- Flowers on a One-Way Street - documentary, Robin Spry 1967 - producer
- The Rise and Fall of the Great Lakes - documentary short, 1968 Bill Mason - producer
- Two Films by Lipsett - experimental short, Donald Rennick 1968 - co-producer with Robert Verrall and Mark Slade
- Christopher's Movie Matinée - documentary, Mort Ransen 1968 - producer
- Continental Drift - animated short, Co Hoedeman 1968 - producer
- Cosmic Zoom - animated short, Robert Verrall 1968 - co-producer with Robert Verrall
- If At First… - documentary short, Gilles Gascon 1969 - producer
- Bing Bang Boom - documentary short, Joan Henson 1969 - producer
- DNA - animated short, Bané Jovanovic 1969 - producer
- Falling from Ladders - documentary short, Mort Ransen 1969 - producer
- The Half-Masted Schooner - documentary short, Bruce Mackay 1969 - producer
- Hymn - experimental short 1969 - producer
- The Medium Is the Massage, You Know - documentary short, Trevor Greenwood 1969 - producer
- Passing Through Sweden - documentary short, Martin Duckworth 1969 - producer
- What Is the Big Complaint? - short film, Salvatore Greco 1969 - producer
- What is Life? - animated short 1970 - co-producer with Robert Verrall
- Matrioska - animated short, Co Hoedeman 1970 - producer
- A Place for Everything - documentary short, 1970 Eric M. Nilsson - producer
- Question of Immunity - documentary short, Bané Jovanovic 1971 - producer
- Saskatchewan - 45° Below - documentary short, Larry Kent 1971 - producer
- What Teacher Expects ... (The Self-fulfilling Prophecy) - documentary short, Barrie McLean & Kristin Weingartner 1971 - producer
- The Underground Movie - animated short, Les Drew 1972 - producer
- Four Portraits - documentary short, Jim McCammon & Richard Leiterman 1978 - producer
- Immigration Law: A Delicate Balance - documentary short, Arnie Gelbart 1978 - producer

== Awards ==
Mathematics at Your Fingertips (1961)

- 15th Canadian Film Awards, Montreal: Genie Award for Best Film, Training and Instruction, 1963
- Columbus International Film & Animation Festival, Columbus, Ohio: Chris Certificate, Information/Education, 1964

The Climates of North America (1962)

- Yorkton Film Festival, Yorkton: Golden Sheaf Award, First Prize, Science, 1964
- 15th Canadian Film Awards, Montreal: Certificate of Merit, Films for Children, 1963

Jet Pilot (1964)

- Columbus International Film & Animation Festival, Columbus, Ohio: Chris Award, First Prize, Information/Education, 1964

Energy and Matter (1966)

- 21st British Academy Film Awards: BAFTA Award for Best Specialised Film, 1968
- International Festival of Didactic Films, Beirut: Gold Medal, 1980
- Roshd International Film Festival, Tehran: Golden Book Trophy - Category: Primary School Film Group, 1993
- Cork International Film Festival, Cork: Certificate of Merit, Scientific and Educational Film, 1966

Flowers on a One-way Street (1967)

- Melbourne Film Festival, Melbourne: Golden Boomerang, Special Prize for Reportage and Style, 1969
- American Film and Video Festival, New York: Blue Ribbon, 1969
- Chicago International Film Festival, Chicago: Gold Hugo for Best Television Film, Local Broadcast, 1968

Imperial Sunset (1967)

- Adelaide Film Festival, Adelaide: Certificate of Merit, 1969

Christopher's Movie Matinee (1968)

- International Filmfestival Mannheim-Heidelberg, Mannheim: Recommendation of the Adult Education Centres Jury, 1969
- Adelaide Film Festival, Adelaide: Certificate of Merit, 1970

Cosmic Zoom (1968)

- Ibero-American Documentary Film. Festival, Bilbao: Gold Medal, 1969
- Trieste Science+Fiction Festival, Trieste: Golden Seal of the City of Trieste, 1969
- International Educational Film Festival, Tehran: Certificate of Merit, Scientific Films, 1969
- International Exhibition of Scientific Film, Buenos Aires: Diploma of Honor, 1970
- International Festival of Short Films, Philadelphia: Award for Exceptional Merit, 1970
- UNIATEC International Technical Film Competition, Berlin: Award of Excellence 1972

The Rise and Fall of the Great Lakes (1968)

- Yorkton Film Festival, Yorkton: Golden Sheaf Award, First Prize, Educational, 1969
- International Educational Film Festival, Tehran: Golden Delfan, First Prize, Scientific Films, 1969
- 24th British Academy Film Awards, London: Best Specialized Film, 1971
- SODRE International Festival of Documentary and Experimental Films, Montevideo: First Place, Documentary 1971
- Canadian Amateur Film Association, Montreal: Special Award, Best Film of the Year, 1971
- Israeli Film Festival, Tel Aviv: Certificate of Merit, 1969
- Canadian Amateur Film Association, Montreal: Certificate of Merit, 1971
- International Film Festival on the Human Environment, Montreal: Diploma of Merit, 1973
- 2nd International Environmental Pollution Exhibition, Winsted, Connecticut: Best Movie, 1975
- International Educational Film Festival, Birmingham, Alabama: Electra Award, Business and Industry, 1989

Bing Bang Boom (1969)

- American Film and Video Festival, New York: Blue Ribbon, 1970
- Australian and New Zealand Association for the Advancement of Science (ANZAAS), Sydney: selection for University Exhibition, 1971

Falling from Ladders (1969)

- International Festival of Short Films, Philadelphia: Award for Exceptional Merit, 1971

What is Life? (1970)

- Columbus International Film & Animation Festival, Columbus, Ohio: Chris Award, 1972

Matrioska (1970)

- American Film and Video Festival, New York: Blue Ribbon, 1971

Question of Immunity (1971)

- Golden Gate International Film Festival, San Francisco: Best Film. Medical and Health, 1972

The Underground Movie (1972)

- Adelaide Film Festival, Adelaide: Certificate of Merit, 1974
