= Cuisenaire rods =

Learning aid for mathematics

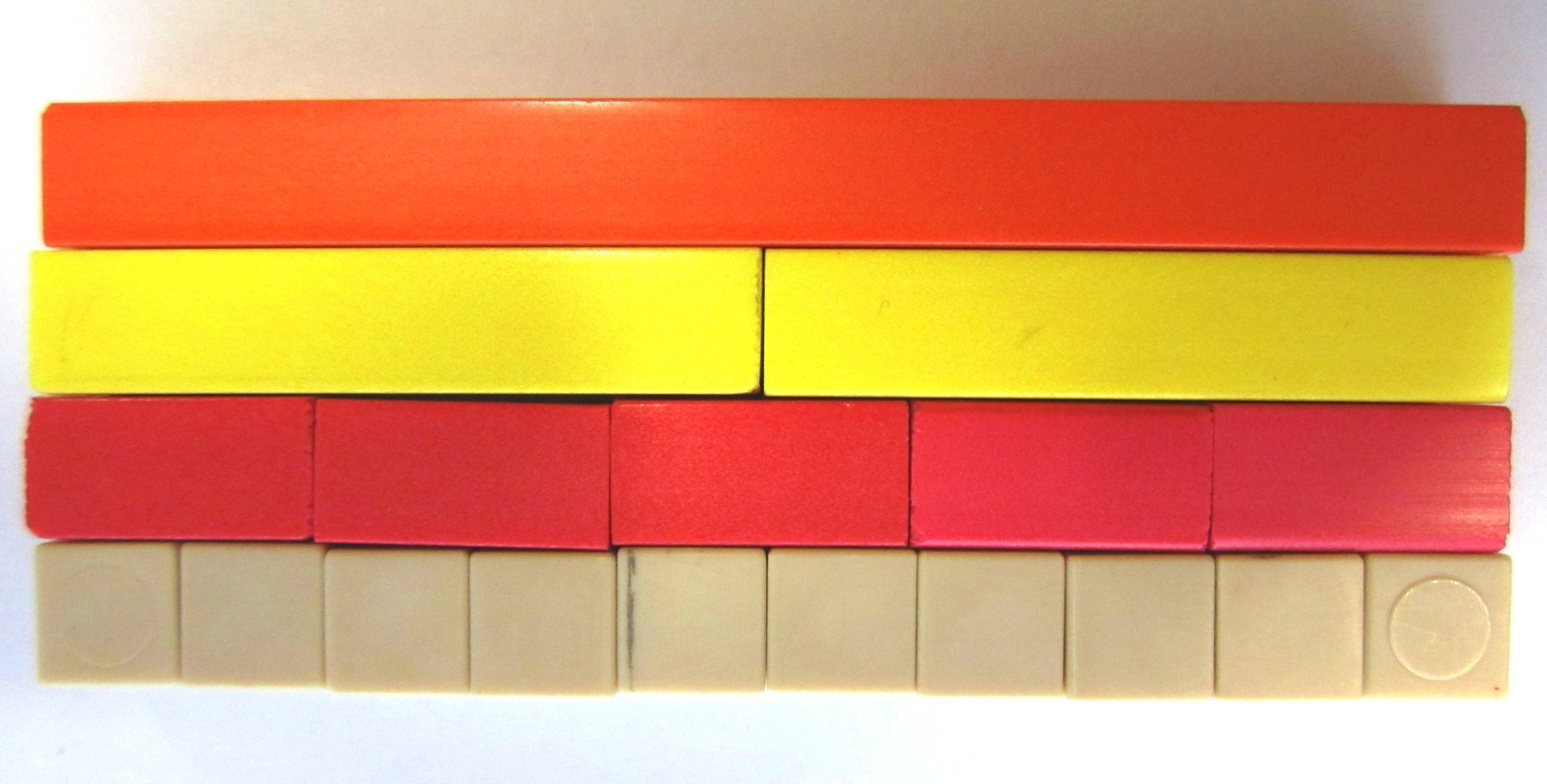
Cuisenaire rods illustrating the factors of ten

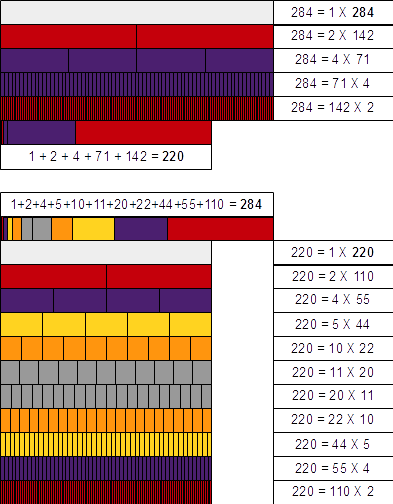
A demonstration of the first pair of amicable numbers, (220,284)

Cuisenaire rods are mathematics learning aids for pupils that provide an interactive, hands-on way to explore mathematics and learn mathematical concepts, such as the four basic arithmetical operations, working with fractions, and finding divisors. In the early 1950s, Caleb Gattegno popularised this set of coloured number rods created by Georges Cuisenaire (1891–1975), a Belgian primary school teacher, who called the rods réglettes ('little rulers').

According to Gattegno, "Georges Cuisenaire showed in the early 1950s that pupils who had been taught traditionally, and were rated 'weak', took huge strides when they shifted to using the material. They became 'very good' at traditional arithmetic when they were allowed to manipulate the rods."

== History ==
The educationalists Maria Montessori and Friedrich Fröbel had used rods to represent numbers, but it was Georges Cuisenaire who introduced the rods that were to be used across the world from the 1950s onwards. In 1952, he published Les nombres en couleurs, Numbers in Color, which outlined their use. Cuisenaire, a violin player, taught music as well as arithmetic in the primary school in Thuin. He wondered why children found it easy and enjoyable to pick up a tune and yet found mathematics neither easy nor enjoyable. These comparisons with music and its representation led Cuisenaire to experiment in 1931 with a set of ten rods sawn out of wood, with lengths from 1 cm (0.4 in) to 10 cm (4 in). He painted each length of rod a different colour and began to use these in his teaching of arithmetic. The invention remained almost unknown outside the village of Thuin for about 23 years until, in April 1953, British mathematician and mathematics education specialist Caleb Gattegno was invited to see pupils using the rods in Thuin. At this point he had already founded the International Commission for the Study and Improvement of Mathematics Education (CIEAEM) and the Association of Teachers of Mathematics, but this marked a turning point in his understanding:

Then, Cuisenaire took us to a table in one corner of the room where pupils were standing round a pile of colored sticks and doing sums which seemed to me to be unusually hard for children of that age. At this sight, all other impressions of the surrounding vanished, to be replaced by a growing excitement. After listening to Cuisenaire asking his first and second grade pupils questions and hearing their answers immediately and with complete self-assurance and accuracy, the excitement then turned into irrepressible enthusiasm and a sense of illumination.

Gattegno named the rods "Cuisenaire rods" and began assessing and popularizing them. Seeing that the rods allowed pupils "to expand on their latent mathematical abilities in a creative and enjoyable fashion", Gattegno's pedagogy shifted radically as he began to stand back and allow pupils to take a leading role:

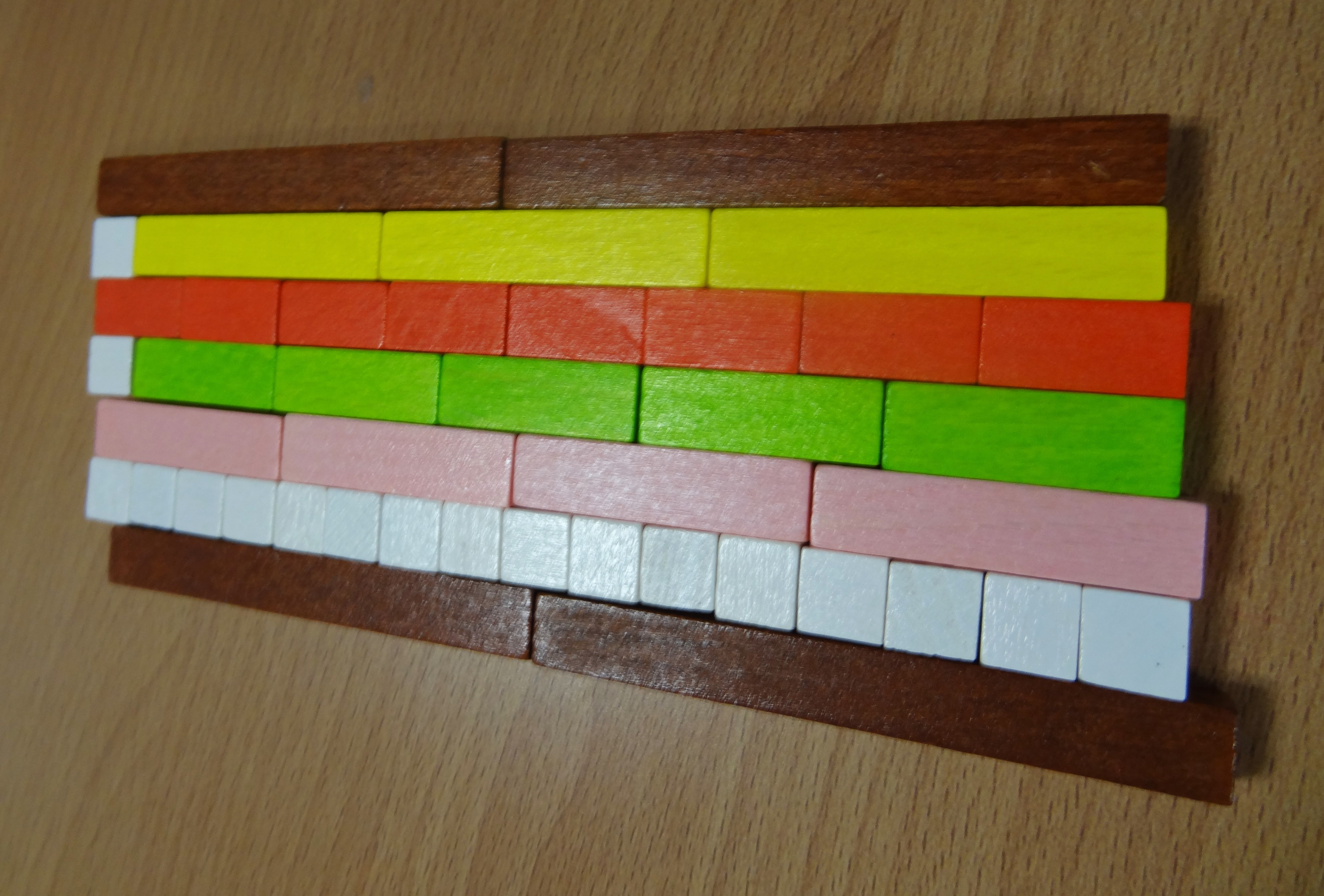
Example of Cuisenaire rods

Cuisenaire's gift of the rods led me to teach by non-interference making it necessary to watch and listen for the signs of truth that are made, but rarely recognized.

While the material has found an important place in myriad teacher-centered lessons, Gattegno's student-centered practice also inspired a number of educators. The French-Canadian educator Madeleine Goutard in her 1963 Mathematics and Children, wrote:

The teacher is not the person who teaches him what he does not know. He is the one who reveals the child to himself by making him more conscious of, and more creative with his own mind. The parents of a little girl of six who was using the Cuisenaire rods at school marveled at her knowledge and asked her: "Tell us how the teacher teaches you all this", to which the little girl replied: "The teacher teaches us nothing. We find everything out for ourselves."

John Holt, in his 1964 How Children Fail, wrote:

This work has changed most of my ideas about the way to use Cuisenaire rods and other materials. It seemed to me at first that we could use them as devices for packing in recipes much faster than before, and many teachers seem to be using them this way. But this is a great mistake. What we ought to do is use these materials to enable children to make for themselves, out of their own experience and discoveries, a solid and growing understanding of the ways in which numbers and the operations of arithmetic work. Our aim must be to build soundly, and if this means that we must build more slowly, so be it. Some things we will be able to do much earlier than we used to, fractions for example.

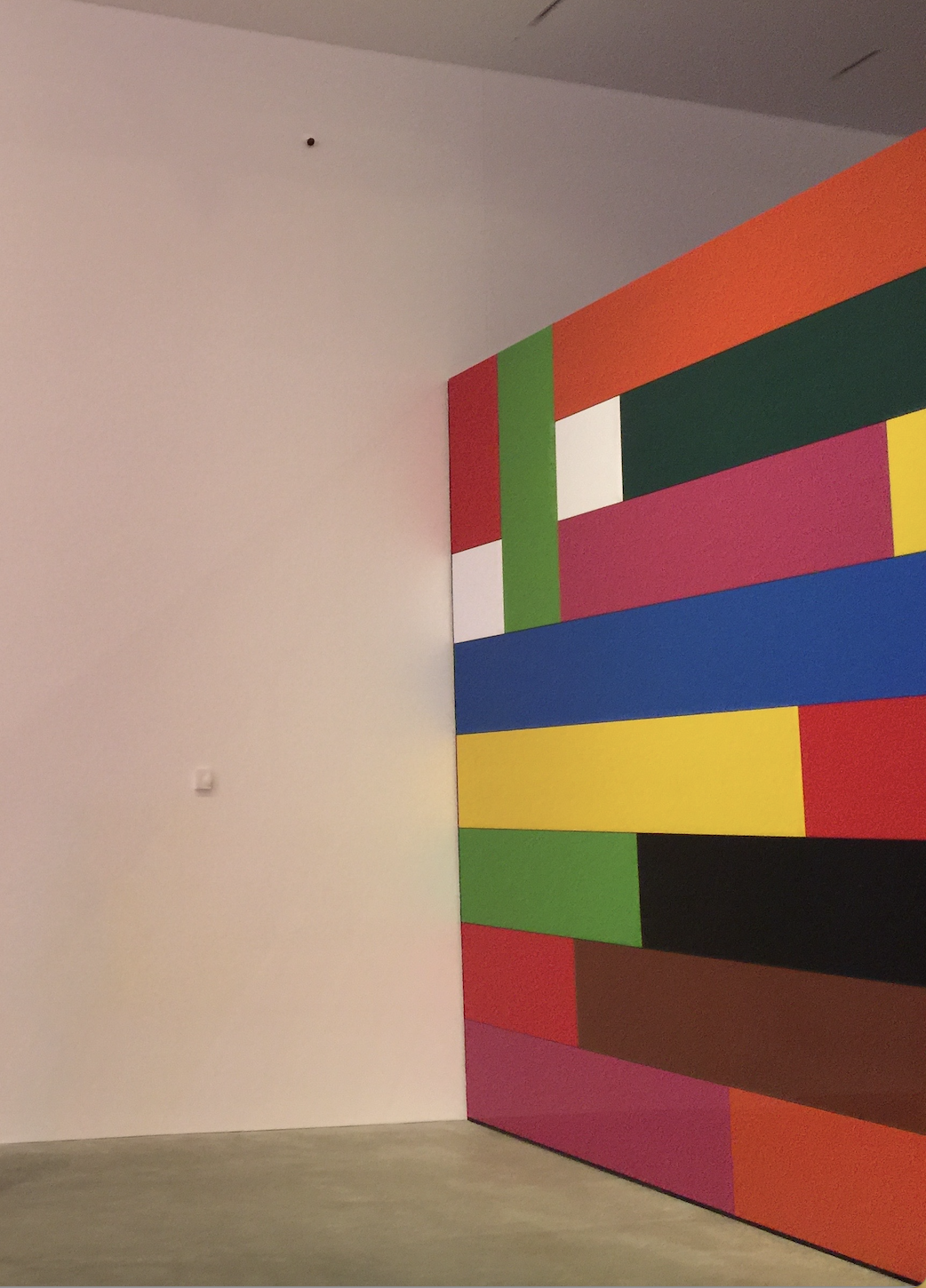
Michael Parekowhai's Cuisenaire rods inspired installation at the Queensland Art Gallery, 2015

Gattegno formed the Cuisenaire Company in Reading, England, in 1954, and by the end of the 1950s, Cuisenaire rods had been adopted by teachers in 10,000 schools in more than a hundred countries. The rods received wide use in the 1960s and 1970s. In 2000, the United States–based company Educational Teaching Aids (ETA) acquired the US Cuisenaire Company and formed ETA/Cuisenaire to sell Cuisenaire rods-related material.

== Rods ==
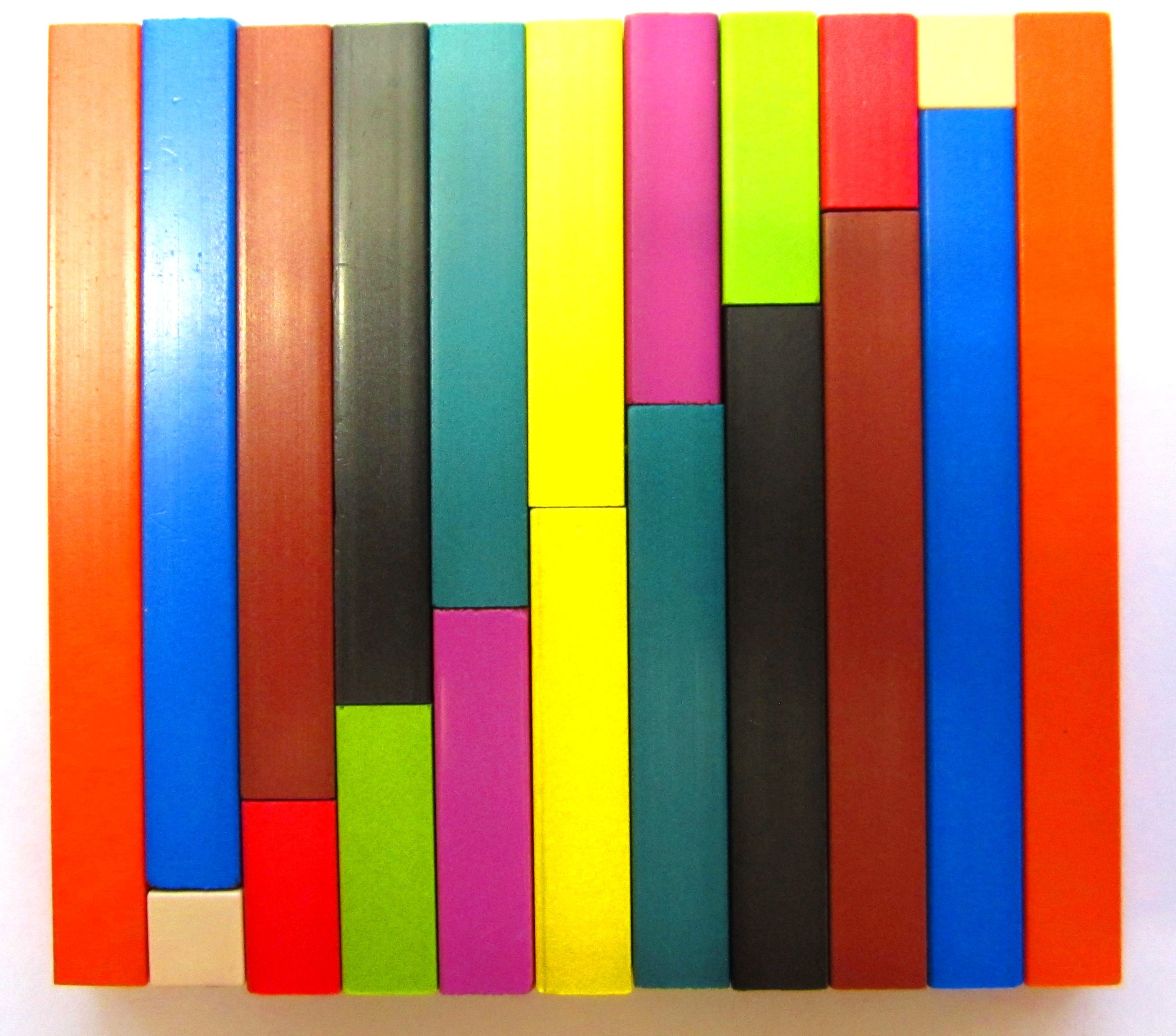
Cuisenaire rods in a staircase arrangement

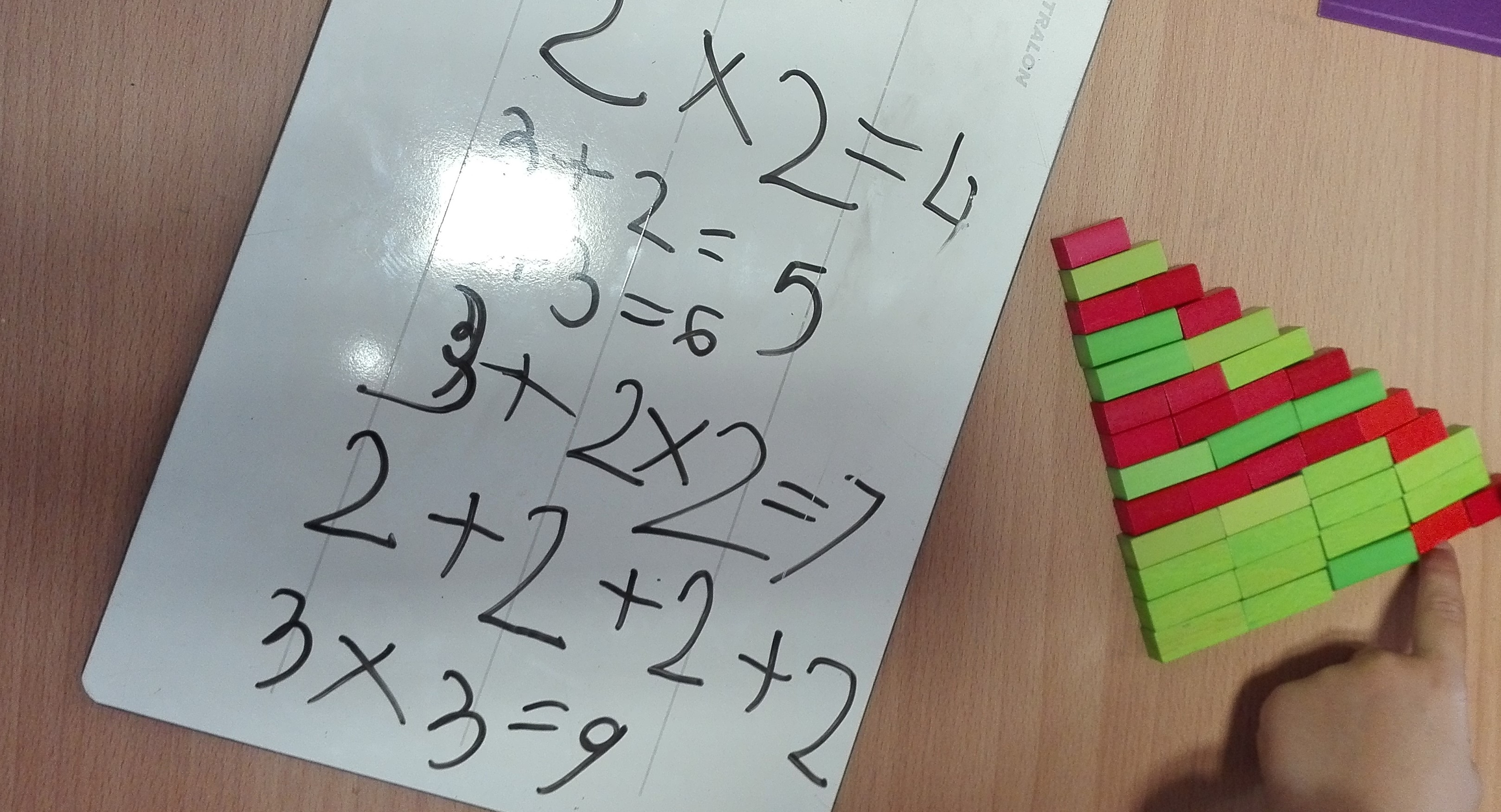
A young child using a "staircase" of red and green rods to investigate ways of composing the counting numbers

Colour	Common abbreviation	Length (in centimetres)
White/Natural Wood	W	1
Red	R	2
Light Green	G	3
Purple/Magenta	P	4
Yellow	Y	5
Dark Green	D	6
Black	K	7
Brown ("Tan")	T	8
Blue	B	9
Orange	O	10

== Use in mathematics teaching ==
The rods are used in teaching a variety of mathematical concepts, and with a wide age range of learners. Topics they are used for include:

- counting, sequences, patterns, and algebraic reasoning;
- addition and subtraction (additive reasoning);
- multiplication and division (multiplicative reasoning);
- fractions, ratio, and proportion;
- modular arithmetic leading to group theory.

== The Silent Way ==
Though primarily used for mathematics, they have also become popular in language-teaching classrooms, particularly The Silent Way. They can be used:

- to demonstrate most grammatical structures such as prepositions of place, comparatives and superlatives, determiners, tenses, adverbs of time, manner, etc.;
- to show sentence and word stress, rising and falling intonation, and word groupings;
- to create a visual model of constructs, for example the English verb tense system;
- to represent physical objects: clocks, floor-plans, maps, people, animals, fruit, tools, etc., which can and has led to the creation of stories.

In New Zealand, they are used as part of the immersion-based Te Ataarangi approach for teaching the Māori language, in which they are known as rākau. Cuisenaire rods have also been used in multiple works by New Zealand artist Michael Parekowhai.

== Other coloured rods ==
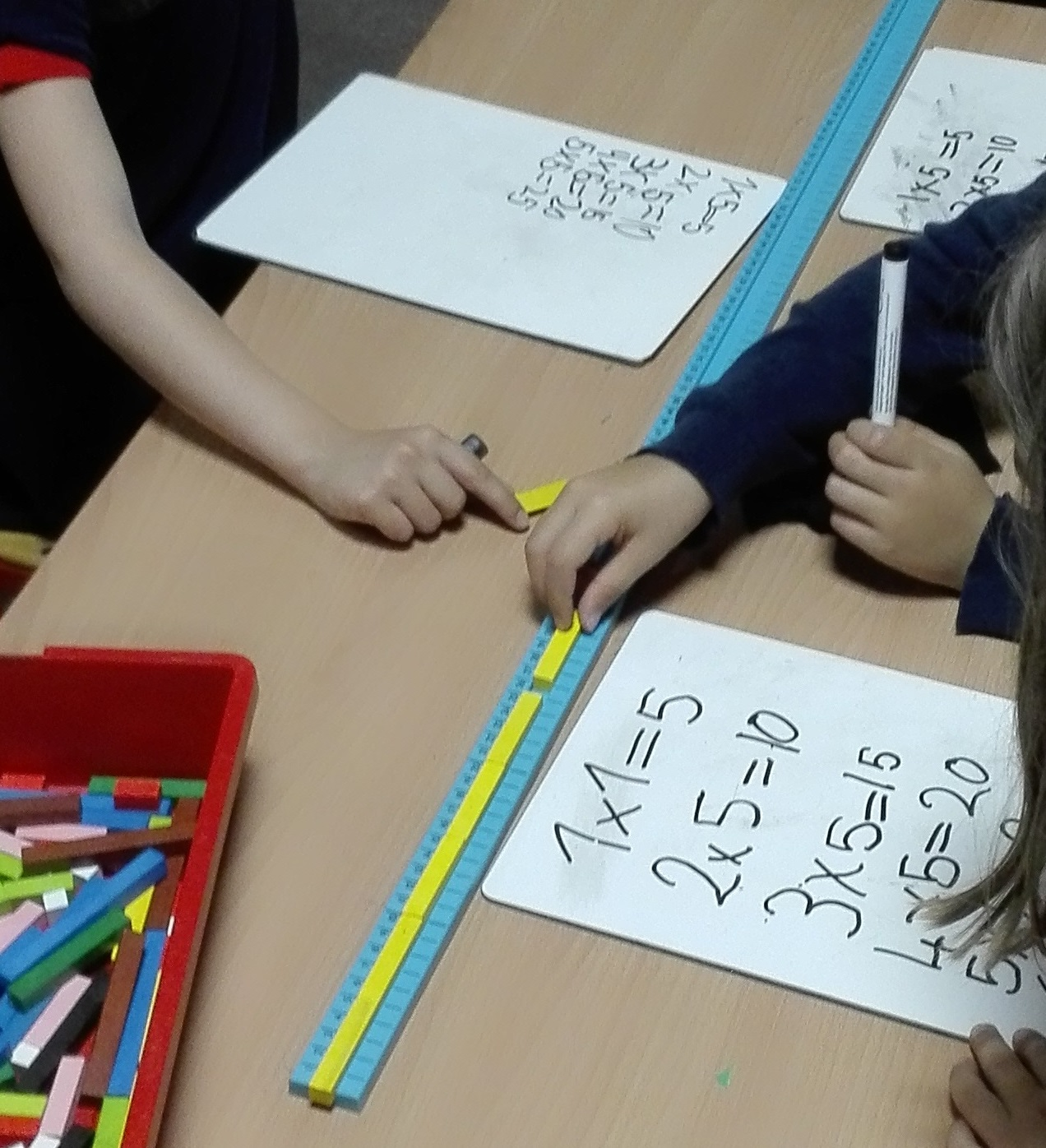
Six-year-olds in class using a Cuisenaire track to explore multiplication. Note the foreground whiteboard has an error on its first line, and should read 1x5=5, not 1x1=5.

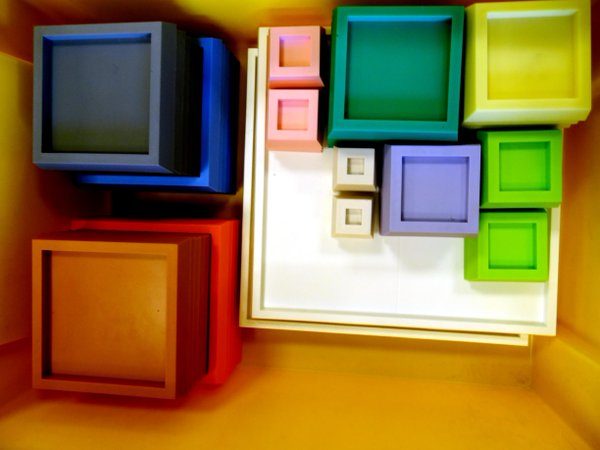
Trays for use with Cuisenaire rods

In her first school, and in schools since then, Maria Montessori used coloured rods in the classroom to teach concepts of both mathematics and length. This is possibly the first instance of coloured rods being used in the classroom for this purpose.

Catherine Stern also devised a set of coloured rods produced by staining wood with aesthetically pleasing colours, and published books on their use at around the same time as Cuisenaire and Gattegno. Her rods were different colours to Cuisenaire's, and also larger, with a 2 cm (0.8 in) unit cube rather than 1 cm (0.4 in). She produced various resources to complement the rods, such as trays to arrange the rods in, and tracks to arrange them on. Tony Wing, in producing resources for Numicon, built on many of Stern's ideas, also making trays and tracks available for use with Cuisenaire rods.

In 1961, Seton Pollock produced the Colour Factor system, consisting of rods from lengths 1 to 12 cm (0.39 to 4.7 in). Based on the work of Cuisenaire and Gattegno, he had invented a unified system for logically assigning a colour to any number. After white (1), the primary colours red, blue, and yellow are assigned to the first three primes (2, 3, and 5). Higher primes (7, 11 etc.) are associated with darkening shades of grey. The colours of non-prime numbers are obtained by mixing the colours associated with their factors – this is the key concept. A patent is registered in Pollock's name for an "Apparatus for teaching or studying mathematics". The aesthetic and numerically comprehensive Colour Factor system was marketed for some years by Seton Pollock's family, before being conveyed to the educational publishing house Edward Arnold. The colours of Pollock's system were named distinctively using, for example, "scarlet" instead of "red", and "amber" instead of "orange". They are listed below.

Colour	Length (in centimetres)
White	1
Pink	2
Light Blue	3
Scarlet	4
Yellow	5
Violet	6
Grey	7
Crimson	8
Royal Blue	9
Amber	10
Dark Grey	11
Mauve	12

== See also ==
- Number line
