= The Rise and Fall of the Great Lakes =

- Directed by: Bill Mason
- Written by: Bill Mason
- Produced by: Joe Koenig
- Starring: Blake James
- Cinematography: Bill Mason
- Edited by: Bill Mason
- Music by: Robert Fleming; Bruce Mackay
- Distributed by: National Film Board of Canada (NFB)
- Release date: 1968
- Running time: 17 minutes
- Country: Canada
- Language: English

The Rise and Fall of the Great Lakes is a 1968 Canadian short film produced by the National Film Board of Canada and directed by Bill Mason. It won the 1971 BAFTA Award for Best Specialised Film.

== Summary ==
The 17-minute colour film is a humorous geography lesson, in which a canoeist travels abruptly through time as he crosses the Great Lakes, experiencing cataclysmic changes in different eras. The film is narrated in ballad form.

Some animation is employed to show the coming and going of the Ice Age when the lakes were born, but most of the other episodes of lake history are suggested by camera tricks that affect the canoeist and so emphasize the change. There is, for instance, a scene where open water suddenly turns to ice, freezing the canoe in mid-paddle. Then the canoe is left in midair high above the water, illustrating the melting of the ice, and causing the canoeist to crash to the water below. At another point, he is almost run over by a huge freighter, illustrating the befouling of the waters by shipping. Such slapstick effects are employed to mark the major changes in the history of the Great Lakes. At intervals the camera examines surviving evidence of the passage of the Ice Age, such as the striations of the rocks and the folds in the earth of farm landscapes viewed from the air. Toward the end of the film the canoeist seems to be finally safe from violent change. He dips his cup for a drink, but with his second sip discovers that the water has been fouled by human-produced industrial waste.

== Production ==
The Rise and Fall of the Great Lakes was created by the NFB for the educational market, with the working title Evolution of the Great Lakes. The film proved so popular with children and teachers in test screenings that it was blown up to 35 mm for theatrical distribution. However, Mason was disappointed when the NFB producer made several changes to his finished work, feeling he had lost creative control.

== Awards ==
- Yorkton Film Festival, Yorkton, Saskatchewan: Golden Sheaf Award, First Prize, Educational, 1969
- International Educational Film Festival, Tehran, Iran: Golden Delfan, First Prize, Scientific Films, 1969
- 24th British Academy Film Awards, London: Best Specialized Film, 1971
- SODRE International Festival of Documentary and Experimental Films, Montevideo, Uruguay: First Place, Documentary 1971
- Canadian Amateur Film Association, Montreal: Special Award, Best Film of the Year, 1971
- Israeli Film Festival, Tel Aviv: Certificate of Merit, 1969
- Canadian Amateur Film Association, Montreal: Certificate of Merit, 1971
- International Film Festival on the Human Environment, Montreal: Diploma of Merit, 1973
- 2nd International Environmental Pollution Exhibition, Winsted, Connecticut: Best Movie, 1975
- International Educational Film Festival, Birmingham, Alabama: Electra Award, Business and Industry, 1989

== See also ==
- Waterlife, a 2009 NFB documentary about the Great Lakes
