= Words in Colour =

Approach to literacy invented by Caleb Gattegno

"Wikipedia, the free encyclopedia" written using the Words in Colour system.

Words in Colour is an approach to literacy invented by Caleb Gattegno. Words in Colour first appeared in 1962, published simultaneously in the UK and US. Later versions were published in French (French: Lecture en Couleurs) and Spanish (Spanish: Letras en Color).

Words in Colour is a synthetic phonics system that uses colour to indicate the phonetic properties of letters. The system has been adapted for the use of deaf children, and for dyslexic children. Words in Colour was one of a number of colour assisted schemes, being followed by Colour Story Reading, Colour Phonics System and English Colour Code.

Caleb Gattegno created a phonic chart named Fidel™. Its purpose is to teach children how to correlate different sounds with letters.

== Colours ==
Colours of Diagraphs
Letters and Groups	IPA	Colour
t, tt, te, ed, d, tte, pt, bt, ct, cht, th, phth, 't	/t/	Fuchsia; #b43a84
w, wh, u, o	/w/	Aqua; #77c3b2
m, mm, me, mb, lm, gm, mn, 'm	/m/	Orange; #dd492b
a, e, u, o, i, ou, io, oi, iou, oa, eou, eo, ia, ai, ie, ei, au, iu, ea, eau, ah, ough, he, y	/ə/	Yellow; #fff105
s, ss, se, 's, c, ce, sc, st, sw, ps, sce, sse, sch, sth, tz	/s/	Lime Green; #85be51
o, oe, ow, owe, oa, ou, ew, oh, ough, eau, oo, au, eo, ot	/oʊ/	Brown - Aqua; #8d4923 to #77c3b2
p, pp, pe, ph, bp	/p/	Chestnut; #922b25
s, ss, se, 's, z, zz, ze, x, si, thes, sth	/z/	Lilac; #a54e8f
f, ff, fe, ph, gh, lf, ft, ffe, pph	/f/	Mauve; #a993ba
r, rr, re, wr, rh, rps, rp, rt, rrh, rre, lo, 're	/ɹ/	Light Orange; #e77a2d
h, wh, j	/h/	Pale Blue; #cfe5d9
l, ll, le, lle, 'll	/l/	Bright Blue; #0078aa
e, ee, ea, y, ie, ei, i, eo, ey, ay, oe, ae, is	/i/	Red; #d92329
v, f, ve, lve, ph, 've	/v/	Khaki; #9f8b18
th, the, h, t, phth	/θ/	Pale Lime; #d9e596
th, the	/ð/	Sod Pink; #d26785
g, gg, gu, gh, gue, ckgu	/ɡ/	Gray; #90918e
u, o, a, ou, oo, oe	/ʌ/	Pale Yellow; #fffac9
d, dd, de, ed, ld, 'd, t, tt	/d/	Green; #1e9a44
e, ea, a, u, ai, ay, ie, eo, ei, ae	/ɛ/	Ice Blue; #69a0bd
b, bb, be, bu, pb	/b/	Bottle Green; #19726a
a, au, ai, i	/æ/	Buff; #d88d86
i, y, o, ey, a, ay, u, ui, e, ee, ia, ai, ie, ei, ea, hi, ae, hea, is, ois	/ɪ/	Dark Pink; #de4681
s, z, ge, t	/ʒ/	French Blue; #006290
n, nn, ne, kn, gn, pn, mn, gne, in, on, dne, nd, ln	/n/	Lavender; #736da4
o, a, ho, oh, ow, eau	/ɒ/	White; #ffffff
y, i, j, u	/j/	Pink; #ea90a5
u, e, o, i, ea, ou, y	/ɜ/	Blush; #e56c7d
o, a, au, aw, awe, ough, oa, augh, oo, ou, hau, ho, ao, oi, owa	/ɔ/	Ochre; #c78f64
a, ea, ah, aa, au, e	/ɑ/	Purple; #915793
k, kk, ke, ck, c, cc, ch, lk, qu, que, che, cqu, cch, co, kh	/k/	Gold; #f3b44c
o, oo, ew, ou, ui, u, oe, ue, eu, ough, wo, ieu	/u/	Dark Green; #008042
a, ai, ea, e, ei, hei, ae, aye, ayo, ey	/ɛə/	Turquoise; #00ab91
oo, ou, u, o	/ʊ/	Mouse; #a98d85
m	/m̩/	Yellow - Orange; #fff105 to #dd492b
n	/n̩/	Yellow - Lavender; #fff105 to #736da4
's	/əz/	Yellow - Lilac; #fff105 to #a54e8f
l, le, 'll	/l̩/	Yellow - Bright Blue; #fff105 to #0078aa
wh	/ʍ/	Pale Blue - Aqua; #cfe5d9 to #77c3b2
r, re, 're	/ɹ̩/	Yellow - Light Orange; #fff105 to #e77a2d
u, you, eu, ue	/jɚ/	Pink - Mouse; #ea90a5 to #ad8b87
o, a, au, oa, oo, ou, ho, ao, oi, owa	/ɔː/	Brown; #8d4923
sh, ch, t, s, ss, c, sch, sc, che	/ʃ/	Sky Blue; #00a5cc
ch, tch, t, c, che	/tʃ/	Dark Magenta; #95406a
ng, n, ngue, nd	/ŋ/	Olive; #706916
I, i, y, ie, ye, igh, eye, eigh, is, ais, ei, aye	/aɪ/	White - Pink; #ffffff to #ea90a5
a, ai, ay, ey, ei, eigh, ea, aigh, et, ae, au, e, ee	/eɪ/	Ice Blue - Pink; #69a0bd to #e98fa5
u, you, ew, iew, eau, ue, ieu, ewe, yew, hu, eu, eue	/ju/	Pink - Dark Green; #ea90a5 to #008042
ou, hou, ow, ough	/aʊ/	Purple - Aqua; #915793 to #77c3b2
oi, oy, aw	/ɔɪ/	Ochre - Pink; #c78f64 to #ea90a5
oi	/wɑ/	Aqua - Purple; #77c3b2 to #915793
o	/wʌ/	Aqua - Pale Yellow; #77c3b2 to #fffac7
j, g, d, dge, ge, gg, dg, dj	/dʒ/	Green - French Blue; #1e9a44 to #006290
qu, cqu	/kw/	Gold - Aqua; #f3b44c to #77c3b2
x, xe, cc, xc	/ks/	Gold - Lime Green; #f3b44c to #85be51
x	/ɡz/	Gray - Lilac; #90918e to #a54e8f
x	/kʃ/	Gold - Sky Blue; #f3b44c to #00a5cc
x	/ɡʒ/	Gray - French Blue; #90918e to #006290
z, zz	/ts/	Fuchsia - Lime; #b43a84 to #85be51

== See also ==
- Silent Way
- Initial teaching alphabet
- Phonics
- Look-say
- Whole-word method
- Whole language

== Bibliography ==
- Teacher's Guide to Words in Colour Gattegno.
