= Articulatory approach for teaching pronunciation =

Teaching method for second language pronunciation

The articulatory approach to teaching pronunciation considers learning how to pronounce a second language to be a motor skill which most students are not in a position to develop based on self-evaluation of their production. The role of the teacher is therefore to provide feedback on students' performance as part of coaching them in the movements of the vocal tract articulators (tongue, jaw, lips, etc.) which create speech sounds.

The articulatory approach is an alternative to the imitative-intuitive and analytic-linguistic approaches, both of which involve the teacher providing a model for her students to imitate. The model might be her own voice or a recording. In the articulatory approach, the students are not asked to match a model but instead to experiment with making sounds, with the teacher acting as a source of ideas, encouragement and feedback on how close the students are getting to the target.

== The problem of categorical perception ==
When learning a new language, students are not in a position to compare L1 and L2 sounds competently because the L2 sounds are evaluated using the categorical perception developed for L1. Trubetzkoy described the process as follows: "The phonological system of a language is like a sieve through which everything that is said passes ... Each person acquires the system of his mother tongue. But when he hears another language spoken, he intuitively uses the familiar 'phonological sieve' of his mother tongue to analyze what has been said. However, since this sieve is not suited for the foreign language, numerous mistakes and misinterpretations are the result. The sounds of the foreign language receive an incorrect phonological interpretation since they are strained through the 'phonological sieve' of one's own mother tongue."

Users of the imitative-intuitive approach, who simply give their students a model to imitate ('Listen and Repeat') believe that this problem will resolve itself with exposure to L2 over the course of time. Users of the analytic-linguistic approach address the problem explicitly through listening exercises, recently including high variability phonetic training. In both approaches, it is believed that as students improve their perception of L2 sounds, they will be better able to match their production of L2 sounds to the models provided.

Proponents of the articulatory approach argue that it is more efficient to begin by working on the production of L2 sounds directly (as a motor skill rather than an imitative task) and that this leads to improved L2 perception.

== History ==
In the late nineteenth century, Henry Sweet argued for the coaching of students in the use of their articulators: "Those who try to learn new sounds by ear alone, without any systematic training in the use of their vocal organs, generally succeed only partially. ... In the case of those who have only an average ear, and still more of those who have a defective ear, organic training is indispensable. There can be no question that flexible organs well trained together with only an average ear, will yield better results than even an exceptionally good ear without organic training. Nor must it be forgotten that fineness of ear is not necessarily accompanied by flexibility of the vocal organs."

Similarly, the phonetician J. C. Catford presented readers with "a series of simple introspective experiments [to be] carried out inside their own vocal tracts, their own throats and mouths. By actually making sounds (very often silently) and attending to the muscular sensations that accompany their production one can discover how they are produced ..."

Catford and Pisoni undertook a small scale experiment in which they found that students learnt both the pronunciation and discrimination of foreign sounds better when they were explicitly taught how to produce them than when they were taught how to discriminate them by ear.

== Contemporary language teaching ==
Within foreign language teaching, the best known proponent of an articulatory approach was Caleb Gattegno. In his Silent Way, the teacher does not model sounds, but encourages experimentation on the part of students, and gives them feedback on how closely they are approaching their targets.

The work of Adrian Underhill, and Piers Messum & Roslyn Young are developments of Gattegno's work.
