= Blake (film) =

- Film poster
- Directed by: Bill Mason
- Written by: Bill Mason; Blake James
- Produced by: Douglas Jackson
- Starring: Blake James
- Narrated by: Bill Mason
- Cinematography: Bill Mason; Blake James
- Edited by: Bill Mason
- Music by: Blake James; Laurent Coderre
- Production company: National Film Board of Canada
- Distributed by: National Film Board of Canada
- Release date: 1969
- Running time: 19 min., 17 sec.
- Country: Canada
- Language: English
- Budget: $47,077

Blake is a 1969 Canadian short documentary film produced by the National Film Board of Canada (NFB). The film was directed by Bill Mason, and his fellow filmmaker Blake James, who pilots his own aircraft and lives by a unique code. Blake is Mason's cinematic testimonial to his friend and his "hobo of the skies" lifestyle. (Note: Bill Mason shot the entire film in 35 mm, the only time he used the larger, but more unwieldy format.)

== Synopsis ==
In autumn 1969, artist and filmmaker Blake James is getting restless, and seeks to escape from his boring job at an advertising agency in Montreal. In his never-ending quest for freedom, Blake sets out for his cabin in the woods near Meech Lake, where he has parked his biplane. His friends have commented on his quirky behaviour, and yet describe him as sweet and intelligent, but almost naive. Feeling a restlessness, Blake begins to gather the materials for a long cross-country flight out of the jumble of items piled up in his cabin.

Without a definite plan for where he is going, Blake flies during daylight hours, generally heading westward. He relies on the most rudimentary navigation, including maps and following train tracks and roads. His biplane does not even have a radio. When he wanders into the landing pattern of Montreal International Airport, Blake causes delays for the airliners in both landing and takeoff positions. (Note: Air Canada Douglas DC-8, Douglas DC-9 and Vickers Vanguard airliners were at the Montreal International Airport.) Instead of getting into trouble, his impromptu landing brings out all the pilots and air traffic control personnel to see the unique biplane.

The journey takes many strange turns, with Blake joining a flock of geese at one point. When he loses his map, after a vain attempt to retrieve it, he follows train tracks to a farm, where he lands and beds down for the night under the wings of his aircraft. A young boy, curious at the sight of an biplane in his family's farmyard, wakes Blake up and gets a chance to sit in the cockpit and wear Blake's flying goggles. Finally, with a throw of the propeller, Blake flies away, continuing his vagabond wandering.

== Cast ==
- Blake James as Himself
- Bill Mason (uncredited as the narrator)
- Douglas Jackson (uncredited as a friend talking to the narrator)
- Paul Mason as the boy (Note: Paul was Bill Mason's 10-year old son.)

== Production ==
Mason and James first met at a commercial art studio in Winnipeg. They later worked together at Crawley Films, before both going to the NFB. James' film credits include an animated vignette on Canadian aviation pioneer Wilfrid R. "Wop" May. He also starred in Mason's acclaimed short film The Rise and Fall of the Great Lakes (1968).

Aerial filming involved both Mason and James, with Blake's biplane equipped with film cameras on the wingtips and in front of the cockpit. (Note: Blake James flew a MacGregor MG65 homebuilt biplane, built in 1960, registered as "CF-RCZ",) Filming Blake was fraught with difficulty and was sometimes dangerous; on one occasion, Mason lost sight of James while filming from another aircraft. It was discovered that James had been forced to land on an island in the St. Lawrence River after forgetting to switch on his main fuel tank. Because there was no radio in the vintage biplane, Mason and James resorted to using hand signals. With James being able to trigger the cameras on his aircraft, he tended to fly in an unorthodox pattern, looking for suitable aerial views of clouds or landscape, but often left Mason, following in a "camera aircraft", far behind. If they were too far apart, Mason would have to land and wait for James to come down; he simply called his friend "lost" on those occasions.

== Release ==
Blake was shown theatrically in Canada and acquired by an American distributor. The NFB had an arrangement with Famous Players theatres to ensure that Canadians from coast-to-coast could see NFB documentaries, with further distribution by Columbia Pictures. The film received widespread notice, as it was shown as an introductory film with MASH (1970), which became one of the "biggest" hits of the early 1970s for 20th Century Fox.

== Awards ==
- 22nd Canadian Film Awards, Toronto: Genie Award for Best Film Under 30 Minutes, 1970
- Melbourne Film Festival, Melbourne: Grand Prix - Golden Boomerang, 1971
- Yorkton Film Festival, Yorkton: Golden Sheaf Award for Best of Festival, 1971
- Yorkton Film Festival, Yorkton: Golden Sheaf Award for Best Social Film, 1971
- Yorkton Film Festival, Yorkton: Golden Sheaf Award for Best Direction, to Bill Mason, 1971
- 42nd Academy Awards, Los Angeles: Nominee: Academy Award for Best Live Action Short Film, 1969
- 24th British Academy Film Awards, London: Nominee: BAFTA Award for Best Short Film, 1971
