= Cry of the Wild =

- Directed by: Bill Mason
- Written by: Bill Mason
- Produced by: William Brind
- Narrated by: Bill Mason
- Cinematography: Bill Mason
- Edited by: Bill Mason
- Music by: Larry Crosley; Bruce Mackay
- Production company: National Film Board of Canada
- Release date: 1972
- Running time: 88 min 04 s
- Country: Canada
- Language: English
- Budget: $74,871
- Box office: $4.5 – $5+ million

Cry of the Wild is a 1972 feature-length documentary film by Bill Mason and his second of three films about wolves. The film is a personal account of the two years Mason spent shooting his first film on wolves, Death of a Legend, incorporating footage from the earlier film. Cry of the Wild was shot in the Northwest Territories, British Columbia and Canadian Arctic, as well as near Mason's home in the Gatineau Hills, where he kept and observed three grown wolves and, eventually, a litter of cubs.

== Release ==
Produced by the National Film Board of Canada (NFB) for $74,871, Cry of the Wild was launched in over 500 theatres in the United States, grossed over one million dollars in its opening week, generating a reported $4.5 million to $5+ million in gross box office. The film earned $1.8 million from 80 theatres in New York and was shown in 500 theatres in the United States. It was the most financially successful film in NFB history.

The feature documentary was initially planned to be released in Canada on a small scale. At a showing in Edmonton, the NFB was approached by an American distributor interested in releasing it in the USA. The company bought the North American rights and released it in New York City, renting out theatres and showing the film on a continuous basis in a formula known as "four-walling." The film was released subsequently all over the U.S. and throughout Canada.

However, the release was not without problems. According to Gary Evans in his book In the National Interest: A Chronicle of the National Film Board of Canada from 1949 to 1989, the NFB only recouped several hundred thousand dollars because of a contract that allowed the American distributor to pocket the bulk of the proceeds and declare bankruptcy. Mason completed his third and final film on wolves, Wolf Pack, in 1974.
