= Principles of Electronics =

Textbook for the Electronics Technician distance education program

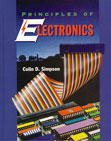

Principles of Electronics is a 2002 book by Colin Simpson designed to accompany the Electronics Technician distance education program and contains a concise and practical overview of the basic principles, including theorems, circuit behavior and problem-solving procedures of Electronic circuits and devices. The textbook reinforces concepts with practical "real-world" applications as well as the mathematical solution, allowing readers to more easily relate the academic to the actual.

Principles of Electronics presents a broad spectrum of topics, such as atomic structure, Kirchhoff's laws, energy, power, introductory circuit analysis techniques, Thevenin's theorem, the maximum power transfer theorem, electric circuit analysis, magnetism, resonance, control relays, relay logic, semiconductor diodes, electron current flow, and much more. Smoothly integrates the flow of material in a nonmathematical format without sacrificing depth of coverage or accuracy to help readers grasp more complex concepts and gain a more thorough understanding of the principles of electronics. Includes many practical applications, problems and examples emphasizing troubleshooting, design, and safety to provide a solid foundation in the field of electronics.

Assuming that readers have a basic understanding of algebra and trigonometry, the book provides a thorough treatment of the basic principles, theorems, circuit behavior and problem-solving procedures in modern electronics applications. In one volume, this carefully developed text takes students from basic electricity through dc/ac circuits, semiconductors, operational amplifiers, and digital circuits. The book contains relevant, up-to-date information, giving students the knowledge and problem-solving skills needed to successfully obtain employment in the electronics field.

Combining hundreds of examples and practice exercises with more than 1,000 illustrations and photographs enhances Simpson's delivery of this comprehensive approach to the study of electronics principles. Accompanied by one of the discipline's most extensive ancillary multimedia support packages including hundreds of electronics circuit simulation lab projects using CircuitLogix simulation software, Principles of Electronics is a useful resource for electronics education.

In addition, it includes features such as:

- Learning objectives that specify the chapter's goals.
- Section reviews with answers at the end of each chapter.
- A comprehensive glossary.
- Hundreds of examples and end-of-chapter problems that illustrate fundamental concepts.
- Detailed chapter summaries.
- Practical Applications section which opens each chapter, presenting real-world problems and solutions.

== Books ==
Principles of Electronics, Prentice-Hall, 2002, ISBN 0-9686860-0-1
Study Guide to Accompany Principles of Electronics, Prentice-Hall, 2002, ISBN 0-13-034414-1
Lab Manual for Principles of Electronics, Prentice-Hall, 2002, ISBN 0-13-034422-2
