= Waterwalker =

- Directed by: Bill Mason
- Produced by: Bill Mason
- Starring: Bill Mason
- Cinematography: Ken Buck
- Edited by: Bill Mason
- Music by: Bruce Cockburn; Hugh Marsh
- Distributed by: NFB
- Release date: 1984
- Running time: 87 minutes
- Country: Canada
- Language: English

Waterwalker is a 1984 documentary film by Bill Mason, a Canadian outdoorsman, painter, canoeist and environmentalist, who made many films on the art of canoeing and on the appreciation of nature. Released theatrically in Canada in 1984, it was nominated for a Genie Award for "Best Documentary Feature."

The film follows Mason as he canoes through whitewater rapids and along the coast of Lake Superior. It features a musical score by Bruce Cockburn. It was Mason's last film.
