= Waterlife =

- Directed by: Kevin McMahon
- Screenplay by: Kevin McMahon
- Produced by: Kristina McLaughlin
- Cinematography: John Minh Tran
- Edited by: Christopher Donaldson
- Release date: 2009
- Running time: 1h 49m
- Country: Canada
- Language: English

Waterlife is a 2009 documentary film and web documentary about the state of the Great Lakes. It was directed by Kevin McMahon.

== Film ==
McMahon began filming Waterlife in 2007. The film explores the beauty of the Great Lakes as well as their degradation due to water pollution. The film looks at the water system from its headwaters in Lake Superior to the Gulf of St. Lawrence, accompanied by Josephine Mandamin, an Anishinabe elder from Thunder Bay, who walks along the Great Lakes each spring to protest deteriorating conditions.

Waterlife is co-produced by Primitive Entertainment and the National Film Board of Canada (NFB). The film received the Special Jury Prize for Canadian Feature at the 2009 Hot Docs Canadian International Documentary Festival. The United Kingdom distributor is Dogwoof Pictures.

== Web documentary ==
The interactive version of Waterlife was created by Toronto-based web and design company Jam3 and creative directors Adrian Belina and Pablo Vio for the NFB, incorporating material from the documentary film. The conception and development of the website took approximately four months. Waterlife explores different aspects of the state of the Great Lakes through 23 individual sections, incorporating text, images and sound. It received the Webby Award for best web documentary (individual episode).

== See also ==
- The Rise and Fall of the Great Lakes, a 1968 NFB film about the Great Lakes
- Water on the Table
