= Death of a Legend =

- Directed by: Bill Mason
- Written by: Stanley Jackson
- Produced by: Barrie Howells
- Starring: Blake James
- Narrated by: Donald Brittain
- Cinematography: Bill Mason; Kjeld Nielsen (animation); Cameron Gaul
- Edited by: Bill Mason; John Knight (sound)
- Music by: Eldon Rathburn
- Production company: National Film Board of Canada
- Release date: 1971
- Running time: 49 minutes
- Country: Canada
- Language: English

Death of a Legend is a 1971 documentary directed by Bill Mason for National Film Board of Canada.

The film is about wolves and the negative myths surrounding the animal. It helps to dispel the image of wolves as "evil" and demonstrates their role in maintaining the balance of nature. Exceptional footage portrays the wolf's life cycle, the social organization of the pack, and offers glimpses of caribou, moose, deer and buffalo. It was the first documentary to feature footage of wolves being born in the wild, and of their first year of life.

Death of the Legend was followed two years later by Mason's feature-length theatrical documentary on wolves, Cry of the Wild, also for the NFB, which screened throughout North America and earned $5. million. In 1974, Mason completed his third and final film on wolves, Wolf Pack.

== Awards ==
- Festival of Tourist and Folklore Films, Brussels: Gold Medal - First Prize, 1971
- Philadelphia International Festival of Short Films, Philadelphia: Award for Exceptional Merit, 1971
- 23rd Canadian Film Awards, Toronto: Genie Award for Best Colour Cinematography to Bill Mason, 1971
- American Film and Video Festival, New York: Red Ribbon, 1972
- International Festival of Scientific and Didactic Films, Madrid: Diploma of Honour, 1972
- Yorkton Film Festival, Yorkton: Golden Sheaf Award for Best Nature and Wildlife Film, 1973
- Yorkton Film Festival, Yorkton: Golden Sheaf Award for Best Cinematography, 1973
- International Festival of Mountain and Exploration Films, Trento: Golden Rhododendron Award, 1974
