= Colin Simpson (Canadian author) =

Canadian entrepreneur, software developer and author

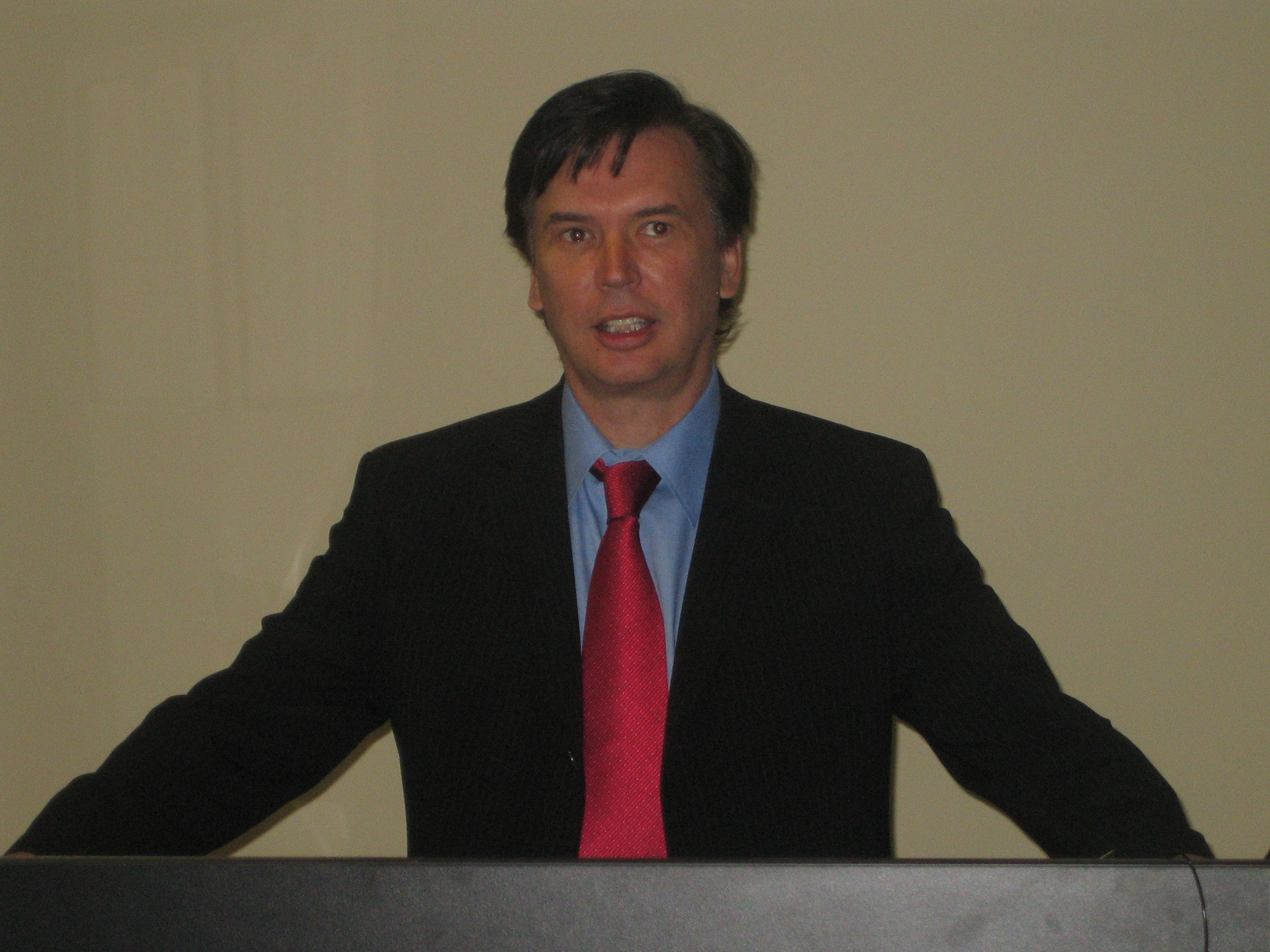
Keynote address, International Distance Education Conference, Copenhagen, 2006

Colin Simpson is a Canadian entrepreneur, software developer, and the author of seven textbooks, including the bestseller Principles of Electronics. With over 500,000 of his textbooks in print, Dr. Simpson is considered as an expert in the teaching of electronics and electronics simulation technology. He has won numerous awards including the Award of Excellence from the Association of Canadian Community Colleges (ACCC), the TVOntario Lifelong Learning Challenge Award, and the Codie award from the Software Publishers Association. Simpson holds two patents in electronics laboratory simulation and control systems technology, and is recognized as an authority on distance education and the integration of laboratory simulation software. He has been interviewed by the CBC, PBS, CTV, TVOntario, The Globe and Mail, Toronto Star, Chicago Tribune, and has lectured at universities around the world. Simpson has a Ph.D. in Electrical Engineering from the University of Hawaii and a Doctorate of Letters from Nipissing University.

== Early years ==
During his tenure as an electronics professor at George Brown College in Toronto, Simpson found that students who were financially disadvantaged and unable to purchase electronics simulation software were achieving poorer grades than their counterparts who were able to purchase such products. At the time, simulation software was prohibitively expensive for a typical student, and Simpson decided to develop his own electronics circuit simulation and make it available free of charge to all students. Simpson approached computer programmer John (Bud) Skinner with this idea, and development work began on a product that ultimately became CircuitLogix. As a result of using this software students grades improved significantly, and it has also removed a very divisive issue from the classroom. In 2005, Simpson launched the commercial version of CircuitLogix called CircuitLogix Pro and in 2012 it reached the milestone of 250,000 licensed users, and became the first electronics simulation product to have a global installed base of a quarter-million customers in over 100 countries.

Simpson was one of the first electronics professors to use simulation software, and his fourth book, Principles of Electronics, was written specifically for use with simulation software. At the time, there was considerable opposition among the electronics education community regarding the use of simulation software for the delivery of electronics curriculum. Many educators felt that a "hands on" methodology was the only valid method of learning electronics, and that simulation was a less-effective substitute. Simpson embarked on a series of lectures, conference presentations and meetings with accrediting organizations throughout 1996, where he demonstrated that electronics simulation software could achieve identical results to laboratory experiments performed with real equipment.

In 1997, Simpson's Electronics Technician distance education program (ET) received approval and accreditation from the Ministry of Training, Colleges and Universities (MTCU). In its first year, the program enrolled over 500 students from 17 countries, with over 30 companies sponsoring employees, and has since become the largest distance education program of its kind in the world.

With over 10,000 students studying electronics at a distance, Simpson's ET distance education program has effectively broken down the barriers that prevent students from accessing technical course material on-line. Of note is that the program has broken the gender barrier in the study of electronics. Typically, less than 2% of students who study electronics in Colleges and Universities are female. In the ET distance education program almost 20% of the student's are female, which has been attributed to the accessibility of the learning material and the integrative multimedia courseware which is designed to scaffold student learning and accommodate learning style differences. The asynchronous learning methodology of Simpson's online technical programs have also attracted a large percentage of mature students who are in their 40s and 50s and require greater flexibility in their studies.

== Robotics and beyond ==
In 2008, Simpson published his book, Introduction to Robotics. He also oversaw the development of a new robotics simulator software package, RoboLogix, which was completed in 2009 and was designed by John (Bud) Skinner using specifications derived from Simpson's research in robotics, algorithms, and simulation technologies. In 2009, Simpson launched the Robotics Technician online program, which presently has over 800 students in 15 countries.

In recent years, Simpson has continued his work in simulation and control systems and in 2006, launched the online PLC Technician program, which was based on his book, Programmable Logic Controllers. The program is now the largest of its kind in the world and provides training to employees in over 100 companies. In 2013, Simpson and Skinner released their first PLC simulation product, PLCLogix, which is designed to simulate the operation of Rockwell Automation's Logix 5000 PLC and is featured in the online PLC Technician program.

One of the main features of PLCLogix is its ability to simulate real world manufacturing environments using interactive 3D animations. These interactive animations are based on Simpson's Programmable Logic Controllers textbook and range from traffic lights to batch mixing to production lines and feature bipeds and other avatars that operate in the various worlds. The integration of ladder programs with these 3D worlds provides a method for programming using real-time computing and observing the operation of complex control devices and systems.

In 2014, Simpson and Skinner released LogixSim, which is a software suite consisting of CircuitLogix, RoboLogix, PLCLogix, and 3DLab. LogixSim's versatility and wide range of simulation capabilities has made it very popular as an educational technology resource in Colleges and Universities. In 2015, Simpson launched his sixth online program, Automation Technician, which uses LogixSim to provide training in automation and control systems including electro-mechanics, robotics and PLCs.

In 2022, Simpson launched the Electric Vehicle (EV) Technician online program which features an enhanced version of CircuitLogix and enables students to safely test and troubleshoot high voltage EV devices and circuits using simulation software. Simpson developed the program based on industry demand for technicians who are able to service and repair EVs and commercial charging stations.

== Personal life ==
Colin Simpson was born in North Bay, Ontario to parents of British heritage. He is the great-great grandson of renowned slavery abolitionist James Phillippo who built one of the first churches in Jamaica, Phillippo Baptist Church, and helped found several Free Villages.

In addition to his work in electronics and simulation technologies, Simpson is also an accomplished musician and producer. In his early 20s, he was a member of the recording group Champion, who achieved gold record status in Canada and were nominated for a CASBY Award in 1989. In an interview with Canadian Musician magazine, Simpson attributed his early interest in electronics out of the necessity of having to repair, maintain and design audio equipment used by bands he performed in. Once he "retired" from the music business at the age of 26, he pursued this love of electronics as a professor, author, inventor, and innovator.

== Awards ==
In 1996, Simpson and Joe Koenig were joint recipients of the Award of Excellence, from the Software Publishers Association for their work in simulation technologies and multimedia.

In 1998, Simpson's electronics program received the Program Excellence Award, from the Association of Canadian Community Colleges, a consortium of 155 Colleges. It was the first time a distance education program had earned this award and was noted by ACCC President, Gerald Brown, as a "landmark achievement in the field of distance education".

In 2003, Simpson's Electronics Technician program received a $1 million grant from the Government of Ontario for the development of a "virtual campus" to support students who were enrolled in 85 cities and towns throughout the province. The award was presented by TVOntario President, Isabel Bassett.

In 2014, Simpson received the Platinum Author award from McMillan-Warner Publishing for reaching 500,000 textbook sales globally.

In 2015, Simpson was awarded an Honorary Doctorate degree from Nipissing University for his global contribution to post-secondary education as an author and software developer.

== Bibliography ==
- Industrial Electronics, Prentice-Hall, 1995, ISBN 0-02-410622-4
- Introduction to Electric Circuits and Machines, Prentice-Hall, 1992, ISBN 0-13-473257-X
- Introduction to Robotics, McMillan-Warner, 2008, ISBN 978-0-9686860-2-7
- Lab Manual for Principles of Electronics, Prentice-Hall, 2002, ISBN 0-13-034422-2
- Principles of Advanced PLCs, McMillan-Warner, 2016, ISBN 978-0-9686860-4-1
- Principles of DC/AC Circuits, Prentice-Hall, 1998, ISBN 0-13-373192-8
- Principles of Electronics, Prentice-Hall, 2002, ISBN 0-9686860-0-1
- Programmable Logic Controllers, Prentice-Hall, 2006, ISBN 0-13-735861-X
- Study Guide to Accompany Principles of Electronics, Prentice-Hall, 2002, ISBN 0-13-034414-1
