= Georges Cuisenaire =

Belgian inventor

- Born: September 7, 1891; Quaregnon, Belgium
- Died: December 31, 1975 (aged 84); Thuin, Belgium
- Education: Royal Conservatory of Mons
- Occupation: Teacher
- Known for: Cuisenaire rods

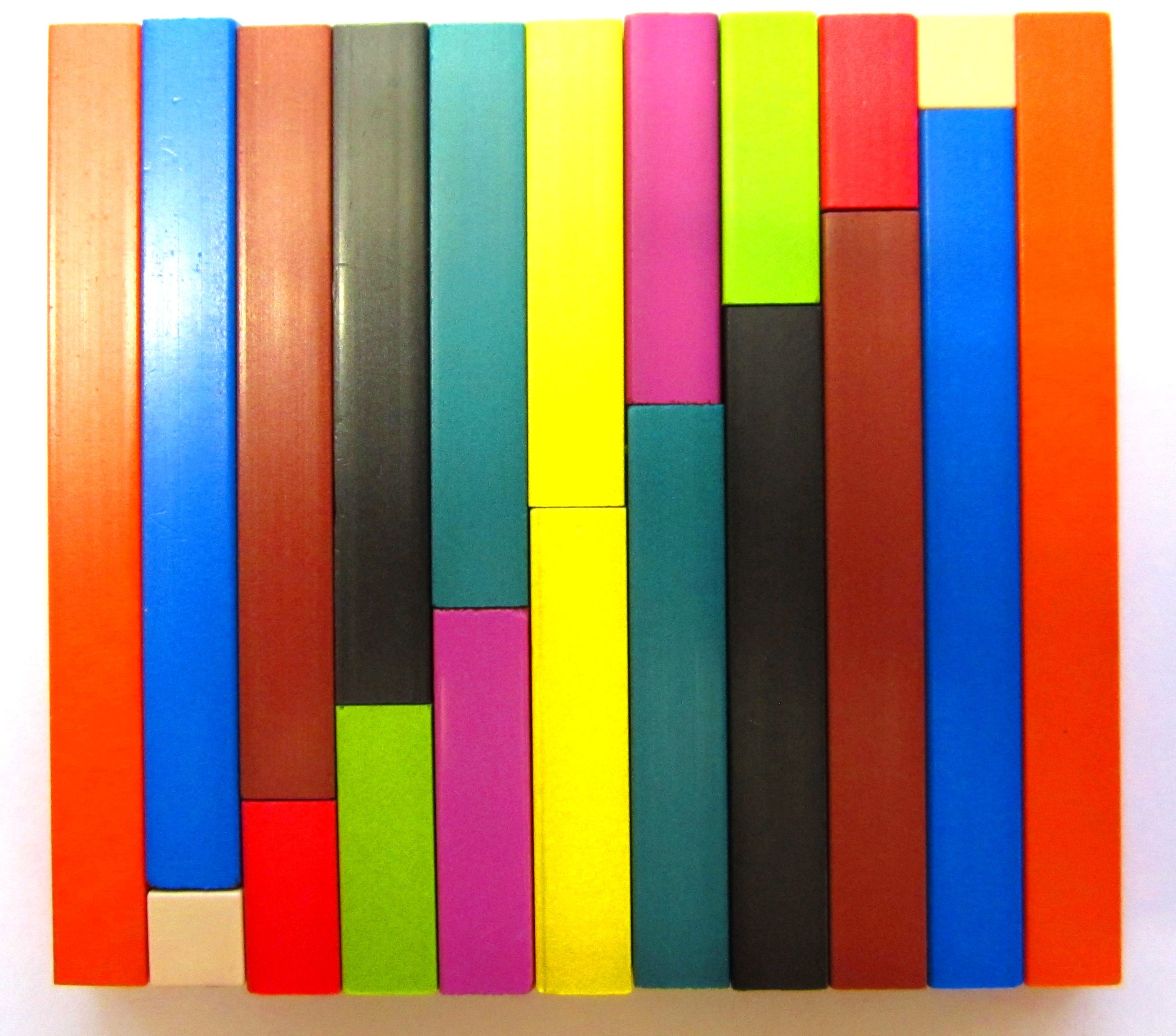
Cuisenaire rods in a "staircase" arrangement

Georges Cuisenaire (1891–1975), also known as Emile-Georges Cuisenaire, was a Belgian teacher who invented Cuisenaire rods, a mathematics teaching aid.

== Life ==
Cuisenaire graduated from the Royal Conservatory of Music at Mons, where he was awarded first prize for violin. He was a primary school teacher at the Ville-Haute school in Thuin from 26 April 1912. In 1948, he became the founder and principal of the Industrial School of Thuin.

== Cuisenaire rods ==
In 1945, following many years of research and experimentation, Cuisenaire created a game consisting of coloured cardboard strips of various lengths that he used to teach mathematics to young children. In 1951, the first edition of Numbers and Colours, the booklet explaining the method, appeared in Belgium.

The "Cuisenaire Rod" method revolutionised the teaching of mathematics by being recognised by pedagogues and psychologists the world over as an instrument of exceptional efficacy. His method was adopted by thousands of teachers in over sixty countries.

== Honours ==
Cuisenaire was made an officer of the Order of Leopold 11 January 1968. In 1973, UNESCO recommended the use of Cuisenaire learning aids and suggested the reform of mathematics education programmes based on his method.
