= Bill Mason =

Canadian naturalist (1929–1988)

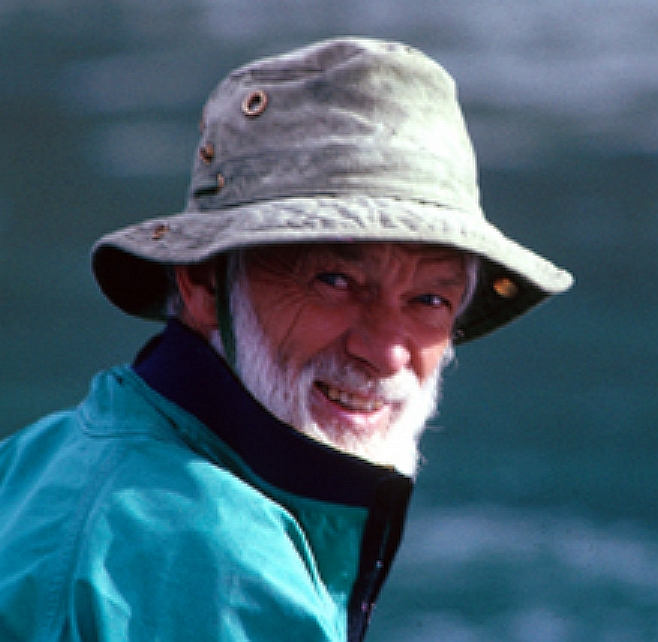
- Born: William Clifford Mason; 1929; Winnipeg, Manitoba, Canada
- Died: October 29, 1988; Meech Lake, Quebec, Canada
- Occupations: Naturalist, author, artist, filmmaker, and conservationist
- Children: 2
- Awards: BAFTA Best Specialised Film; 1970 The Rise and Fall of the Great Lakes; 1977 Path of the Paddle: Doubles Basic; Path of the Paddle: Doubles Whitewater; Path of the Paddle: Solo Basic; Path of the Paddle: Solo Whitewater

Bill Mason (1929–1988) was a Canadian naturalist, author, artist, filmmaker, and conservationist, noted primarily for his popular canoeing books, films, and art, as well as his documentaries on wolves. Mason was also known for including passages from Christian sermons in his films. He was born in 1929 in Winnipeg, Manitoba, and graduated from the University of Manitoba School of Art in 1951. He developed and refined canoeing strokes and river-running techniques, especially for complex whitewater situations. Mason canoed all of his adult life, ranging widely over the wilderness areas of Canada and the United States. Termed a "wilderness artist", Mason left a legacy that includes books, films, and artwork on canoeing and nature. His daughter Becky and son Paul are also both canoeists and artists. Mason died of cancer in 1988.

== Canoeing ==
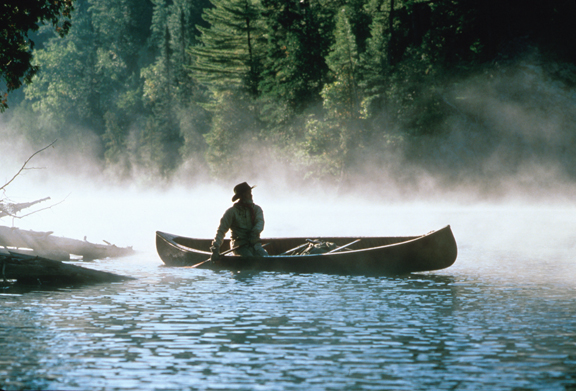
Bill Mason in a canoe

In his review of James Raffan's 1996 biography of Mason, Michael Peake refers to Mason as "the patron saint of canoeing". To many Canadian and American paddlers and canoeists growing up in the 1970s and '80s, his series of instructional films was the introduction to technique and the canoeing experience. In many ways, Bill, Joyce, Paul, and Becky Mason were the "faces" of Canadian canoeing in the 1970s. Mason's good friend, filmmaker Blake James, also frequently appeared in his films.

Although he used a variety of Chestnut models in his films, including the "Pal", his favourite boat was a red "Fort" Chestnut Prospector, a 16-foot canvas-covered wooden canoe that he claimed was the most versatile design ever manufactured, in spite of the popularity of more modern construction techniques and materials. After his death, this canoe was donated to the Canadian Canoe Museum in Peterborough, Ontario, where it is on display. His wife, Joyce, and children, Paul and Becky, frequently travelled with him and contributed to his later books and films, and have continued his life work and environmentalism.

== Honours ==
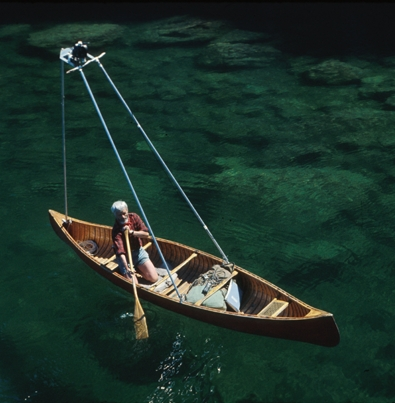
Mason in a canoe with overhead camera

Mason won several honours, including being featured on a Canadian postage stamp in 1998. After his death, a warden at Nahanni National Park Reserve informally started calling the dramatic rock spire, in the midst of Virginia Falls, "Mason's Rock". This usage appears to have become widespread, although it has not yet been made official. His films can be viewed for free on the internet through the website of the National Film Board of Canada.

The Ottawa-Carleton District School Board has memorialized Mason with a "72-acre outdoor classroom on the west side of the City of Ottawa, which [has as] its primary focus to provide an opportunity to Ottawa-Carleton District School Board (OCDSB) and non-OCDSB students to explore, experience, appreciate, and learn about natural science and outdoor activities in an outdoor setting."

== Works by Bill Mason ==
=== Books ===
- Path of the Paddle ISBN 1-55209-328-X, on the technique of Canadian style canoeing
- Song of the Paddle ISBN 1-55209-089-2, on wilderness canoe travel
- Canoescapes - a compilation of text and his paintings

=== Films ===
- Quetico (1958) - a young Bill Mason paddles in Quetico Provincial Park in a short Christopher Chapman production
- Wilderness Treasure (1962) - won a Canadian Film Award in the category of Travel and Recreation in 1963
- The Voyageurs (1964)
- Paddle to the Sea (1966) - nominated for Best Short Film, 1968 Academy Awards
- The Rise and Fall of the Great Lakes (1968)
- Blake (1969) - on the passion of flying, about his friend, fellow filmmaker and pilot Blake James, nominated Best Live Action Short Film, 1970 Academy Awards
- Death of a Legend (1971) - a documentary on the threats to wolves
- Cry of the Wild (1972) - a film on timber and Arctic wolves
- Goldwood (1974) A journey to a past family homestead on a now deserted island.
- In Search of the Bowhead Whale (1974) - adventure film of a whaling expedition
- Wolf Pack (1974) - a short film on wolf pack interrelationships, including among wolves the Mason family kept on their own property.
- Face of the Earth (1975)
- Path of the Paddle (1977) - a series of films on the techniques of canoeing
- Song of the Paddle (1978) - a film of one of Bill Mason's family wilderness canoeing trips—Canadian Film Awards 1978 (Best Direction, Best Cinematography in Documentary under 60 Minutes, Best Sound Editing)
- Coming Back Alive (1980) - an instructional film on recreational boating safety
- Pukaskwa National Park (1983) - a film covering one of Mason's favourite areas, the Pukaskwa region of Lake Superior.
- The Land that Devours Ships (1984)
- Waterwalker (1984) - a feature-length film of Bill Mason's journey on Lake Superior

== Sources ==
- Buck, K. 2005. Bill Mason: Wilderness Artist From Heart to Hand. Rocky Mountain Books. ISBN 1-894765-60-5
- Mason, P. The Thrill of the Paddle ISBN 1-55209-451-0
- Raffan, J. 1996. Fire in the Bones, Bill Mason and the Canadian Canoeing Tradition. Toronto: Harper Collins
