= Association of Teachers of Mathematics =

Organization in the UK

- Abbreviation: ATM
- Formation: 1950
- Legal status: Non-profit organisation and registered charity
- Purpose: Promote mathematics education in both UK and international schools
- Location: 2a Vernon Street, Vernon House, Derby DE1 1FR
- Region served: UK/rest of world
- Members: 3,500 maths teachers
- Senior Administrative Officer: Sam Walters
- Main organ: ATM General Council
- Website: www.atm.org.uk

The Association of Teachers of Mathematics (ATM) was established by Caleb Gattegno in 1950 to encourage the development of mathematics education to be more closely related to the needs of the learner. ATM is a membership organisation representing a community of students, nursery, infant, primary, secondary and tertiary teachers, numeracy consultants, overseas teachers, academics and anybody interested in mathematics education.

== Aims ==
The stated aims of the Association of Teachers of Mathematics are to support the teaching and learning of mathematics by:

- encouraging increased understanding and enjoyment of mathematics
- encouraging increased understanding of how people learn mathematics
- encouraging the sharing and evaluation of teaching and learning strategies and practices
- promoting the exploration of new ideas and possibilities
- initiating and contributing to discussion of and developments in mathematics education at all levels

== Guiding principles ==
ATM lists as its guiding principles:

- The ability to operate mathematically is an aspect of human functioning which is as universal as language itself. Attention needs constantly to be drawn to this fact. Any possibility of intimidating with mathematical expertise is to be avoided.
- The power to learn rests with the learner. Teaching has a subordinate role. The teacher has a duty to seek out ways to engage the power of the learner.
- It is important to examine critically approaches to teaching and to explore new possibilities, whether deriving from research, from technological developments or from the imaginative and insightful ideas of others.
- Teaching and learning are cooperative activities. Encouraging a questioning approach and giving due attention to the ideas of others are attitudes to be encouraged. Influence is best sought by building networks of contacts in professional circles.

== Structure ==
There are about 3500 members, mainly teachers in primary and secondary schools. It is a registered charity and all profits from subscriptions and trading are re-invested. Its head office is located in central Derby.

=== Branches ===
Working within the aims and guiding principles of the Association of Teachers of Mathematics, ATM Branches provide the opportunity for professionals to share ideas and experiences in their own areas.

== Publications ==
ATM publishes Mathematics Teaching, a non-refereed journal with articles of interest to those involved in mathematics education. The journal is sent to all registered members. There are some free 'open access' journals available to all on the ATM website. ATM also publishes a range of resources suitable for teachers at all levels of teaching.

== See also ==
- Association for Science Education
- Science, Technology, Engineering and Mathematics Network
- Science Learning Centres - based at the University of York
