= CircuitLogix =

Electronic circuit simulator software

- Developer: Logic Design Inc.
- Stable release: V14.0 / March 2021; 5 years ago
- Operating system: Windows (XP, Vista, Windows 7, Windows 8, Windows 10)
- Type: Electronic circuit simulation
- License: Proprietary
- Website: www.circuitlogix.com

CircuitLogix is a software electronic circuit simulator which uses PSpice to simulate thousands of electronic devices, models, and circuits. CircuitLogix supports analog, digital, and mixed-signal circuits, and its SPICE simulation gives accurate real-world results. The graphic user interface allows students to quickly and easily draw, modify and combine analog and digital circuit diagrams. CircuitLogix was first launched in 2005, and its popularity has grown quickly since that time. In 2012, it reached the milestone of 250,000 licensed users, and became the first electronics simulation product to have a global installed base of a quarter-million customers in over 100 countries. CircuitLogix was developed by Dr. Colin Simpson, an electronics professor at George Brown College, in Toronto, Canada, and John (Bud) Skinner, a computer programmer. The electronics program has won awards including the Award of Excellence from the Association of Canadian Community Colleges (ACCC).

The professional version of CircuitLogix (CircuitLogix Pro) includes over 10,000 device models, as well as 8 virtual instruments. It also includes 3DLab, which is a software product that combines an interactive 3-dimensional learning environment and electronic devices and tools to enhance the user's comprehension of electronics. 3DLab virtual components include batteries, switches, motors, lamps, resistors, inductors, capacitors and instruments including oscilloscopes, signal generators, and frequency counters.

== Overview ==
Fast, accurate simulation of electronic circuits is essential because it provides the information needed to perform accurate analysis of circuit behavior. SPICE simulators are used to verify that analog and mixed-signal circuits will yield the expected outputs. A schematic netlist file and circuit input values are fed to the SPICE software, which simulates the circuit's behavior for a specified length of time. CircuitLogix allows for the observation of voltage and current levels at any circuit node as they change with frequency and time. It allows for obtaining accurate results even when simulating complex circuits where hierarchical blocks are reused. The CircuitLogix simulation engine is based on Berkeley SPICE, and contains a GUI to make circuit design easier and more efficient.

The CircuitLogix 32-bit SPICE engine is interactive, allowing, for example, the frequency of sources to be changed, potentiometers adjusted, and switches thrown during simulation. The SPICE engine is fully integrated with the schematic capture and waveform tools; CircuitLogix passes schematic edits to the simulator automatically while running. Components such as fuses, LEDs and controlled switches are automatically updated in the schematic as the simulation runs.

CircuitLogix simulates analog, digital, and mixed analog-digital circuits. The simulator first divides the circuit into analog and digital portions. The analog circuitry is simulated with the time-step driven SPICE engine, while the digital parts are simulated separately with an event-driven simulation engine. The CircuitLogix digital engine was developed directly in .NET, faster than SPICE macros. Because the simulator automatically performs signal conversion, it is possible to connect any analog or digital part to any other. The system’s model library contains hybrid parts for analog-to-digital and digital-to-analog conversion.

== Mixed-mode simulation ==
CircuitLogix is a mixed-mode schematic editor, and includes both analog and event-driven simulation capabilities: any simulation may contain components that are analog, event driven (digital or sampled-data), or a combination of both. An entire mixed signal analysis can be driven from one integrated schematic. All the digital models in CircuitLogix provide accurate specification of propagation time and rise/fall time delays.

The event-driven algorithm used by CircuitLogix is general-purpose and supports non-digital types of data. For example, elements can use real or integer values to simulate DSP functions or sampled data filters. Because the event-driven algorithm is faster than the standard SPICE matrix, simulation time is greatly reduced for circuits that use event-driven models in place of analog models.

Mixed-mode simulation is handled on three levels by CircuitLogix: (a) with primitive digital elements that use timing models and a built-in 12-state digital logic simulator, (b) with subcircuit models that use the actual transistor topology of the integrated circuit, and finally, (c) with In-line Boolean logic expressions. These two modeling techniques use SPICE to solve a problem while the third method, digital primitives, uses mixed-mode capability.

== Component library ==
The component library includes:

Digital primitives
Gates, DeMorgan symboled gates, buffers, inverters, flip-flops
Semiconductors
Semiconductor Resistors & capacitors, diodes, Schottky & Zener diodes, Bridge rectifiers, Varactor

Transistors, FETs
BJT, IGBT, UJT, PUT, MESFET, MOSFET, Darlington transistor

Displays, indicators, switches
LEDs, 7-Segment LEDs, Hex display, Hex key, Logic display, NC push-button, NO push button, SPDT PB, Piezo buzzer, Pulser, Latch coil, Polar latch, Rocket, SCOPE, Stepper, Stoplight, Window
Integrated Circuits

Digital ICs
1K RAM, 32x8 PROM, complete selection of 40xx, 41xx, 45xx, 47xx, 74xxx IC's
Linear ICs
Op amps, Comparators, Timers, Buffers, CDAs, Modulators, A/D converters & D/A converters, PLL, VCO

Relays
Control relay, SPST, DPDT, Individual contacts and coils (enable creation of any relay)
Power supplies, Sources
Battery, Voltage Terminal, Signal generator, I Source, V Source, I->I Source, V->I Source, I->Switch, V->Switch, I->V Source, V->V Source
Math devices
A wide variety of devices for manipulating quantities
Miscellaneous Devices
Crystals, Fuses, Transformers, DC Motor, F-V & V-F converters
Transmission lines
Lossless, Lossy, and Uniform Distributed RC
Vacuum tubes
12AU7, 12AX7, 5879, 6L6GC, 6SN7, 7199P, 7199T
Instruments
Oscilloscope, Digital Multimeter, Bode plotter, Curve tracer, Data Sequencer, Signal generator, Logic analyzer, Logic probe, Logic Pulser
Simulation Controls
Initial Condition and Nodeset devices
Miscellaneous
Optoisolators, Photodiodes, Voltage regulators, References, SCRs, Triacs

== See also ==
- Comparison of EDA Software
