= Roshd International Film Festival =

Roshd Film Festival
- Location: Tehran, Iran
- Founded: 1963
- Founded by: Ministry of education
- Language: Persian
- Website: festival.roshd.ir/en

Roshd International Film Festival is eldest film festival in Iran. It is centered on the films with educational and pedagogical themes and is staged every year by the Supplying Educational Media Center, a sub-branch of the Ministry of Education of the I.R.Iran. The festival seeks the main objectives of identifying and selecting the best educational and pedagogical films in order to introduce them to the educational systems.

== History ==
Roshd International Film Festival was first staged in 1963 by the Bureau of Audio-visual Activities of the Ministry of Education of Iran.

From the 20th festival on, the official name of the festival turned into its current name, i.e. "Roshd International Educational Film Festival".

== Objectives ==
The main objectives of Roshd International Film festival are as follows: Identifying, choosing, and introducing the best educational and pedagogical films in order to encourage the Iranian and foreign film makers who are active in the field of educational films and promote artistic and cultural interactions among them.
