= Tom Daly (filmmaker) =

Canadian filmmaker (1918–2011)

- Born: Thomas Cullen Daly; April 25, 1918; Toronto, Ontario, Canada
- Died: September 18, 2011 (aged 93); Westmount, Quebec, Canada
- Education: Upper Canada College; University College, Toronto
- Occupations: Producer; Film editor Film director
- Years active: 1940–1984
- Awards: Officer of the Order of Canada; Dr. hc, Concordia University (Film awards below)

Thomas Cullen Daly OC (April 25, 1918 – September 18, 2011) was a Canadian film producer, film editor and film director, who was the head of Studio B at the National Film Board of Canada (NFB).

During his 44-year career, Daly produced, edited and/or directed 315 films.

His remarkable awards roster includes eight BAFTA awards, eight Venice Film Festival awards, seven Cannes Film Festival awards and ten Oscar nominations. On April 27, 2000, he was appointed an Officer of the Order of Canada.

== Early life ==
Thomas Cullen Daly was the second of three children born to Katherine Cullen Daly and Richard Arthur Daly. His was a prominent family; his mother was a Forest Hill socialite and his father was a stockbroker and founder of R.A. Daly and Company. Tom attended Upper Canada College and then University College, Toronto. There, he sat on the school's Art Committee and, as a member of the College Literary and Athletic Society, acted in and directed plays and musicals, and won first prize for a poem called Musician's Lament. He was also his class president and, in a 1938 address, advised fellow students to “not attempt too much...it is better to do one thing, or a few things, well.”

Daly graduated in 1940 and sought to go into the field of information, or anti-propaganda communication. A year earlier, the Canadian government had created the National Film Board of Canada, which was a perfect fit for Daly's aspirations. He asked his Upper Canada College principal, the very highly regarded Terence MacDermot, for a letter of reference. MacDermot wrote directly to NFB Commissioner John Grierson, telling him that Daly was “A first-rate classical scholar...clever and quick above the average, with a ready pen and refreshing personality....Remember he can create with his pen, and his flair is dramatic. If you can find a place for a possible soldier in that (information) field, I think you would be repaid by his dog-like devotion and talents.” Daly did not see this letter until his retirement party in 1984. But he was hired and, in the fall of 1940, moved to Ottawa.

== Career ==
Daly was passionate about assisting in the NFB's war effort. Grierson was taken with his intellect and bookish manner and hired him as a production assistant, jokingly calling him "the best butler in the business", an expression which would serve as the title for film scholar D.B. Jones's decades later book on Daly, The Best Butler in the Business: Tom Daly of the National Film Board of Canada. Daly learned the art of film editing from filmmaker Stuart Legg; while he is not credited until 1943, it is likely that Daly worked on some of Legg's 1940-1942 films.

== Unit B ==
As head of the NFB's Unit B, Daly was involved in, or responsible for, numerous milestones and achievements in both documentary and animation film art, including Cinéma vérité and Direct Cinema productions. He was also heavily involved in the multi-projector cinematic presentation In the Labyrinth, which eventually led to the development of IMAX. Daly was persuaded to put aside his studio responsibilities for a year and a half to edit In the Labyrinth.

Daly also produced such works as Colin Low's Corral, Wolf Koenig and Roman Kroitor’s Lonely Boy, Koenig and Low's City of Gold, Kroitor and Low's Universe, Arthur Lipsett’s Very Nice, Very Nice, Robin Spry's One Man, and Gerald Potterton’s animated short My Financial Career. Daly also served as executive producer on Candid Eye, a 14-part cinema-vérité series made between 1958 and 1961.

Daly ran a mixed-discipline studio that included many of the most talented Canadian film-makers of the time, including an animation group with Norman McLaren, Don Arioli, and Robert Verrall; a documentary team including Roman Kroitor and Terence Macartney-Filgate. Both Colin Low and Wolf Koenig worked at various times in both areas.

== Retirement and death ==
In 1980, Daly received an honorary doctorate from Concordia University. He was appointed an Officer of the Order of Canada in 2000.

He died on September 18, 2011, after a lengthy illness, at the Chateau Westmount residence in Westmount, Quebec.

== Filmography ==
All for the National Film Board of Canada

- The Gates of Italy - documentary short, Stuart Legg 1943 - co-writer, -editor and -producer with Stuart Legg
- Battle of Europe - documentary short, Stuart Legg 1944 - co-writer, -editor and -producer with Stuart Legg
- Inside France - documentary short 1944 - producer, co-director with Stuart Legg
- Our Northern Neighbour - documentary short 1944 - editor, director
- Atlantic Crossroads - documentary short 1945 - editor, director, co-producer with Grant McLean
- Guilty Men - documentary short 1945 - writer, producer, director
- Ordeal by Ice - documentary short 1945 - producer, director
- Road to the Reich - documentary short 1945 - writer, producer, director
- Canada: World Trader - documentary 1946 - producer, director
- The Challenge of Housing - documentary short 1946 - producer, director
- Out of the Ruins - documentary short, Nicholas Read 1946 - producer
- Eye Witness 0: Shipping Milk to Europe, Tuna Fishing, Shipping Grain to Britain, Garden Seed Industry - documentary short 1947 - co-producer with Don Mulholland
- Eye Witness No. 1: Chalk River, Industrialization in South Africa - documentary short 1947 - co-producer with Don Mulholland
- The People Between - documentary short, Grant McLean 1947 - producer, editor, co-writer with Grant McLean
- Canadian International Trade Fair - documentary short, Ronald Dick 1948 - producer
- Who Will Teach Your Child? - documentary short, Stanley Jackson 1948 - co-producer with Gudrun Parker
- Hungry Minds - documentary short 1948 - producer, director
- Yellowknife, Canada - documentary short 1948 - producer, director
- Children's Concert - documentary, Gudrun Parker 1949 - co-editor with Guy Glover
- Family Circles - documentary short, Ronald Dick 1949 - co-producer with Gudrun Parker
- Science at Your Service - documentary short, Ronald Dick 1949 - editor, producer
- Teeth Are to Keep - animated short, Jim MacKay and Dino Rigolo 1949 - producer
- On Stage - instructional short, Ronald Dick 1949 - producer
- 4 Songs by 4 Gentlemen - sing-song film, Michael Spencer 1950 - executive producer
- Making Primitive Stone Tools - documentary short, Douglas Leechman 1950 - producer
- The Unadulterated Truth - documentary short, Ron Weyman 1950 - producer
- Folksong Fantasy - animated puppet film, Alma Duncan 1950 - producer
- Rhythm and Percussion - documentary, Gudrun Parker 1950 - co-editor with Guy Glover
- A Friend at the Door - documentary short, Leslie McFarlane 1950 - co-producer with James Beveridge
- Family Tree - animated short film, George Dunning and Evelyn Lambart 1950 - producer
- Feelings of Depression - documentary short, Stanley Jackson 1950 - producer
- Sing a Little - animated puppet film, Jean-Paul Ladoceur and Evelyn Lambart 1951 - producer
- Sur le Pont d'Avignon - puppet film, Wolf Koenig and Jean-Paul Ladouceur 1951 - producer
- The Longhouse People - documentary short, Allan Wargon 1951 - producer
- V for Volunteers - documentary short, Leslie McFarlane 1951 - producer
- Royal Journey - documentary short, David Bairstow, Gudrun Parker and Roger Blais 1951 - producer
- Breakdown - documentary, Robert Anderson 1951 - executive producer
- Caribou Hunters - documentary short, Stephen Greenlees 1951 - producer
- Pen Point Percussion - documentary short, Norman McLaren 1951 - co-producer with Norman McLaren
- Canada's Awakening North - documentary short, Ronald Dick 1951 - editor
- Fighting Forest Fires with Hand Tools - training film, Lawrence Cherry 1951 - producer
- Fighting Forest Fires with Power Pumps - training film, Lawrence Cherry 1951 - producer
- Lismer - documentary short, Allan Wargon 1951 - producer
- Trade Fair - documentary short, Robert Anderson 1952 - producer
- Warp and Weft - documentary short, Betty Brunke 1952 - producer
- Age of the Beaver - documentary short, Colin Low 1952 - producer
- The Romance of Transportation in Canada, Colin Low 1952 - producer
- The Newcomers - documentary short, David Bennett 1953 - producer
- Varley - documentary short, Allan Wargon 1953 - producer
- Winter in Canada - documentary short, Guy L. Coté 1953 - producer
- Dick Hickey - Blacksmith - documentary short, David Bennett 1953 - executive producer
- Canadian Notebook - documentary short, David Bennett 1953 - producer
- Paul Tomkowicz: Street-railway Switchman - documentary short, Roman Kroitor 1953 - editor, co-producer with Roman Kroitor
- Shyness - documentary, Stanley Jackson 1953 - producer
- Rescue Party - training film, Roman Kroitor 1953 - producer
- A Shocking Affair - animated short, Laurence Hyde 1953 - executive producer
- Poison Ivy Picnic - animated short, Laurence Hyde 1953 - producer
- Corral - documentary short 1954 - producer
- A Thousand Million Years - animated short, Colin Low 1954 - producer
- The Homeless Ones - documentary short, Leslie McFarlane 1954 - executive producer
- The Magnificent - documentary short, Julian Biggs 1954 - editor
- Salt Cod - documentary short, Allan Wargon 1954 - producer
- One Little Indian - puppet film, Grant Munro 1954 - co-producer with Colin Low
- Look Before You Leap - animated short, Laurence Hyde 1954 - executive producer
- Physical Regions of Canada - documentary short 1954 - producer, director
- Mountains of the West - documentary short, Donald Fraser 1954 - executive producer
- Iron from the North - documentary short, Walford Hewitson 1955 - producer
- No Longer Vanishing - documentary short, Grant McLean 1955 - producer
- The Structure of Unions - animated short, Morten Parker 1955 - executive producer
- Riches of the Earth - documentary short, Colin Low 1955 - producer
- Grain Handling in Canada - documentary short, Guy L. Coté 1955 - producer
- Look Alert, Stay Unhurt - short film, Gordon Burwash 1955 - editor
- Gold - documentary short, Colin Low 1955 - producer
- Farm Calendar - documentary short, Roman Kroitor 1955 - producer
- The Jolifou Inn - documentary short, Colin Low 1955 - producer
- To Serve the Mind - short film, Stanley Jackson 1955 - producer
- Canadian Venture - documentary, Caryl Doncaster 1956 - producer
- Introducing Canada - documentary short 1956 - producer, director, co-editor with Roman Kroitor
- Forest Fire Suppression - documentary short, Lawrence Cherry 1956 - producer
- The Great Lakes - St Lawrence Lowlands - documentary short, Betty Brunke 1956 - producer
- City of Gold - documentary short, Colin Low and Wolf Koenig 1957 - editor, producer
- The Great Plains - documentary short, Roman Kroitor 1957 - producer
- It's a Crime - animated short, Wolf Koenig 1957 - producer
- Carpenters of the Forest - documentary short, Heinz Sielmann 1957 - executive producer
- Blue Vanguard: Revised - documentary, Ian MacNeill 1957 - producer
- The Atlantic Region - documentary short, Donald Fraser 1957 - producer
- Canadian Profile - documentary, Allan Wargon 1957 - producer
- The Precambrian Shield - documentary short, David Bennett 1957 - producer
- Profile of a Problem Drinker - documentary short, Stanley Jackson 1957 - producer
- Putting it Straight - documentary short, William Greaves 1957 - producer
- Looking Beyond...Story of a Film Council - documentary short, Stanley Jackson 1958 - producer
- High Arctic: Life on the Land - documentary, Dalton Muir 1958 - executive producer
- The Changing Forest - documentary short, Maurice Constant 1958 - executive producer
- The Face of the High Arctic - documentary short, Dalton Muir 1958 - executive producer
- Railroaders - documentary short, Guy L. Coté 1958 - executive producer
- Smoke and Weather - documentary short, William Greaves 1958 - executive producer
- Stigma - short film, Stanley Jackson 1958 - executive producer
- Trans Canada Summer - documentary, Ronald Dick 1958 - producer
- Wheat Rust - documentary short, Maurice Constant 1958 - executive producer
- Blood and Fire - documentary short (Candid Eye), Terence Macartney-Filgate 1958 - executive producer
- A Foreign Language - documentary short (Candid Eye), Stanley Jackson 1958 - executive producer
- Country Threshing - documentary short (Candid Eye), Wolf Koenig 1958 - executive producer
- Pilgrimage - documentary short (Candid Eye), Terence Macartney-Filgate 1958 - executive producer, co-editor with Lucien Marleau
- Memory of Summer - documentary short (Candid Eye), Stanley Jackson 1958 - executive producer
- Police - documentary short (Candid Eye), Terence Macartney-Filgate 1958 - executive producer
- The Days Before Christmas - documentary short (Candid Eye), Terence Macartney-Filgate, Stanley Jackson and Wolf Koenig 1958 - executive producer
- Glenn Gould - Off the Record - documentary short (Candid Eye), Wolf Koenig and Roman Kroitor 1959 - executive producer
- Glenn Gould - On the Record - documentary short (Candid Eye), Wolf Koenig and Roman Kroitor 1959 - executive producer
- Emergency Ward - documentary short (Candid Eye), William Greaves 1959 - executive producer
- The Back-Breaking Leaf - documentary short (Candid Eye), Terence Macartney-Filgate 1959 - executive producer
- End of the Line - documentary short (Candid Eye), Terence Macartney-Filgate 1959 - executive producer
- Gateway to Asia - documentary short 1959 - editor, producer, director
- City Out of Time - documentary short, Colin Low 1959 - producer
- Fishermen - documentary short, Guy L. Coté 1959 - executive producer
- The Canadians - documentary short, Terence Macartney-Filgate 1959 - editor, producer, director
- The Living Stone - documentary short, John Feeney 1959 - producer
- Pangnirtung - documentary short, John Feeney 1959 - producer
- Fifty Miles from Poona - documentary short, Fali Bilimoria 1959 - producer
- Radiation - documentary short, Hugh O'Connor 1959 - executive producer
- A is for Architecture - documentary short, Gerald Budner and Robert Verrall 1960 - co-producer with Colin Low
- Universe - documentary short, Colin Low and Roman Kroitor 1960 - editor, producer
- Circle of the Sun - documentary short, Colin Low 1960 - editor, producer
- Above the Timberline: The Alpine Tundra Zone - J.V. Durden 1960 - executive producer
- Arctic Outpost: Pangnirtung N.W.T. - documentary short, John Feeney 1960 - producer
- I Was a Ninety-Pound Weakling - documentary short, Wolf Koenig and Georges Dufaux 1960 - executive producer
- Interview with Linus Pauling - documentary, Joe Koenig 1960 - executive producer
- Life in the Woodlot - documentary short, Dalton Muir 1960 - executive producer
- Microscopic Fungi - documentary short, J.V. Durden 1960 - executive producer
- The Price of Fire - documentary short, Bruce Parsons 1960 - executive producer
- Roughnecks: The Story of Oil Drillers - documentary short, Guy L. Coté 1960 - producer
- The Cars in Your Life - documentary short (Candid Eye), Terence Macartney-Filgate 1960 - executive producer
- Festival in Puerto Rico - documentary short (Candid Eye), Wolf Koenig and Roman Kroitor 1961 - executive producer
- Very Nice, Very Nice - documentary short, Arthur Lipsett 1961 - co-producer with Colin Low
- The Days of Whiskey Gap - documentary short, Colin Low 1961 - executive producer
- Cattle Ranch - documentary short, Guy L. Coté 1961 - executive producer
- Do You Know the Milky Way? - documentary short, Colin Low 1961 - executive producer
- New York Lightboard - promotional short, Norman McLaren 1961 - producer
- Snow - documentary short, Barrie McLean 1961 - executive producer
- Trout Stream - documentary short, Hugh O'Connor 1961 - executive producer
- University - documentary, Stanley Jackson 1961 - executive producer
- Lonely Boy - documentary short, Wolf Koenig and Roman Kroitor 1962 - executive producer
- The Climates of North America - documentary short, Joe Koenig 1962 - executive producer
- 21-87 - documentary short, Arthur Lipsett 1963 - co-producer with Colin Low
- Experimental Film - documentary short, Arthur Lipsett 1962 - producer
- Runner - documentary short, Don Owen 1962 - producer
- The Joy of Winter - documentary short, Jean Dansereau and Bernard Gosselin 1962 - executive producer
- Kindergarten - documentary short, Guy L. Coté 1962 - producer
- The Living Machine - documentary, Roman Kroitor 1962 - producer
- My Financial Career - animated short, Gerald Potterton 1962 - co-producer with Colin Low
- The Peep Show - cartoon, Kaj Pindal 1962 - executive producer
- The Great Toy Robbery - cartoons, Jeff Hale 1963 - executive producer
- Christmas Cracker - short film, Norman McLaren, Jeff Hale, Gerald Potterton and Grant Munro 1963 - executive producer
- A Christmas Fantasy - short film, John Feeney 1963 - producer
- I Know an Old Lady Who Swallowed a Fly - cartoon, Derek Lamb 1963 - executive producer
- The Origins of Weather - documentary short, Joe Koenig 1963 - executive producer
- Pipers and A’ - documentary short, Austin Campbell 1963 - producer
- The Ride - short film, Gerald Potterton 1963 - executive producer
- Sky - experimental film, John Feeney 1963 - producer
- Toronto Jazz - documentary short, Don Owen 1963 - executive producer
- The World of David Milne - documentary short, Gerald Budner 1963 - co-producer with Colin Low
- An Essay on Science - documentary short, Guy L. Coté 1964 - producer
- Free Fall - short film, Arthur Lipsett 1964 - co-producer with Colin Low
- Country Auction - documentary short, Roy Nolan and Ron Tunis 1964 - producer
- The Edge of the Barrens - documentary short, Dalton Muir 1964 - executive producer
- Eskimo Artist: Kenojuak - documentary short, John Feeney 1964 - producer
- Antigonish - documentary short, Stanley Jackson 1964 - executive producer
- Above the Horizon - documentary short, Roman Kroitor and Hugh O'Connor 1964 - executive producer
- The Hutterites - documentary short, Colin Low 1964 - co-producer with Roman Kroitor
- Nobody Waved Good-bye - feature, Don Owen 1964 - executive producer
- Jet Pilot - documentary short, Joe Koenig 1964 - producer
- Legault's Place - documentary short, Suzanne Angel 1964 - co-producer with Roman Kroitor
- The Persistent Seed - short film, Christopher Chapman 1964 - executive producer
- Two-and-a-Half - documentary short, Brian Pearce 1964 - producer
- Two Men of Montreal - documentary, Suzanne Angel, Donald Brittain and Don Owen 1965 - co-producer with Donald Brittain, Roman Kroitor and John Kemeny
- Experienced Hands - documentary short, Theodore Conant 1965 - executive producer
- The Sea Got in Your Blood - documentary short, David Millar 1965 - producer
- Take It from the Top - documentary short, Eugene Boyko 1966 - co-producer with Peter Jones
- Stravinksy - documentary, Roman Kroitor and Wolf Koenig 1966 - executive producer
- The Forest - documentary short 1966 - editor and director
- Helicopter Canada - documentary, Eugene Boyko 1966 - co-producer with Peter Jones
- Antonio - documentary short, Tony Ianzelo 1966 - producer
- Island Observed - documentary short, Hector Lemieux 1966 - producer
- Satan's Choice - documentary short, Donald Shebib 1966 - producer
- Kurelek - documentary short, William Pettigrew 1967 - executive producer, co-producer with Robert Verrall
- Niagara Falls - short film, Derek May 1967 - producer
- Poen - experimental short, Josef Reeve 1967 - producer
- In the Labyrinth - experimental film, Roman Kroitor, Hugh O'Connor and Colin Low 1967 - editor, co-producer with Roman Kroitor
- Christopher's Movie Matinée - documentary short, Mort Ransen 1968 - associate producer
- Sir! Sir! - documentary short, Michael Rubbo 1968 - co-producer with Cecily Burwash
- Danny and Nicky - documentary, Douglas Jackson 1969 - executive producer
- Falling from Ladders - documentary short, Mort Ransen 1969 - co-producer with John Kemeny and Joe Koenig
- Mrs. Ryan's Drama Class - documentary short, Michael Rubbo 1969 - co-producer with Cecily Burwash
- If He Is Devoured, I Win - experimental film, Rick Raxlen 1969 - co-producer with Stanley Jackson
- McBus - short film, Derek May 1969 - producer
- Prologue - feature, Robin Spry 1969 - co-producer with Robin Spry
- Sad Song of Yellow Skin - documentary, Michael Rubbo 1970 - producer
- Girls of Mountain Street - documentary short, Susan Huycke 1970 - producer
- Half-Half-Three-Quarters-Full - documentary short 1970 - with Barrie Howells, producer, director
- Pillar of Wisdom - documentary short, Josef Reeve 1970 - producer
- Espolio - short film, Sidney Goldsmith 1970 - producer
- A Film for Max - documentary, Derek May 1970 - producer
- Here's to Harry's Grandfather - documentary, Michael Rubbo 1970 - producer
- The Burden They Carry - documentary short, Mort Ransen 1970 - co-producer with John Kemeny
- Legend - short film, Rick Raxlen 1970 - producer
- N-Zone - experimental film, Arthur Lipsett 1970 - executive producer
- November - short film, Robert Nichol 1970 - producer
- Overspill - documentary short, Mort Ransen 1970 - co-producer with John Kemeny
- A Place for Everything - documentary short, Eric M. Nilsson 1970 - co-producer with John Kemeny and Joe Koenig
- A Rosewood Daydream - documentary short, Ian MacNeill 1970 - executive producer
- Untouched and Pure - documentary, Mort Ransen, Martin Duckworth and Christopher Cordeaux 1970 - co-producer with John Kemeny
- Where Have All the Farms Gone? - documentary short, Michael Brun 1970 - producer
- The Winds of Fogo - documentary short, Colin Low 1970 - producer
- The Wish - documentary short, Martin Duckworth 1970 - producer
- Wake Up, Mes Bons Amis - documentary, Pierre Perrault 1970 - co-producer with Paul Larose and Guy L. Coté
- Anger After Death - documentary short, Rick Raxlen 1971 - producer
- God Help the Man Who Would Part with His Land - documentary short, George C. Stoney 1971 - co-producer with Colin Low
- Atomic Juggernaut - documentary short, Eugene Boyko 1971 - co-producer with Walford Hewitson
- Persistent and Finagling - documentary, Michael Rubbo 1971 - producer
- Summer's Nearly Over - documentary short, Michael Rubbo 1971 - producer
- Wet Earth and Warm People - documentary, Michael Rubbo 1971 - producer
- Garden - animation experiment, Christopher Nutter 1971 - producer
- Dance Class - documentary short, Joan Henson 1971 - executive producer
- Improv - short film, Joan Henson 1971 - producer
- The Mechanical Knee - documentary short, Claudia Overing 1971 - co-producer with Jean Roy
- Norman Jewison, Film Maker - documentary, Douglas Jackson 1971 - executive producer
- Once...Agadir - documentary short, Jacques Bensimon 1971 - executive producer
- Pandora - experimental film, Derek May 1971 - producer
- Paper Boy - short film, Clay Borris 1971 - producer
- Pearly Yeats - experimental short, Bruce Mackay 1971 - producer
- Saskatchewan: 45 Below - documentary short, Larry Kent 1971 - co-producer with Joe Koenig
- The Sea - documentary short, Bané Jovanovic 1971 - co-producer with Colin Low and William Brind
- This Is a Photograph - documentary short, Albert Kish 1971 - producer
- Three Guesses - documentary short, Joan Henson 1971 - executive producer
- Beware, Beware, My Beauty Fair - documentary short, Jean Lafleur and Peter Svatek 1972 - executive producer
- Centaur - documentary short, Susan Huycke 1972 - producer
- Cold Pizza - documentary short, Larry Kent 1972 - producer
- Cowboy and Indian - documentary, Don Owen 1972 - producer
- The Huntsman - short film, Douglas Jackson 1972 - executive producer
- Light to Starboard - documentary, Jerry Krepakevich 1972 - executive producer
- Louisbourg - documentary short, Albert Kish 1972 - producer
- Mirage - short film, Rick Raxlen 1972 - producer
- One Hand Clapping - documentary short, Joan Henson 1972 - executive producer
- The Sloane Affair - drama, Douglas Jackson 1972 - executive producer
- Coming Home - documentary, Bill Reid 1973 - co-producer with Colin Low
- Downhill - documentary short, Robin Spry 1973 - co-producer with Robin Spry
- Accident - documentary short, Martin Duckworth and Patrick A. Crawley 1973 - producer
- Action: The October Crisis of 1970 - documentary, Robin Spry 1973 - co-producer with Robin Spry and Normand Cloutier
- Jalan, Jalan: A Journey in Sundanese Java - documentary short, Michael Rubbo 1973 - producer
- The Man Who Can't Stop - documentary, Michael Rubbo 1973 - co-producer with Richard Mason
- The Streets of Saigon - documentary short, Michael Rubbo 1973 - producer
- Tickets s.v.p. - animated short, Pierre Perrault 1973 - co-producer with Wolf Koenig
- Reaction: A Portrait of a Society in Crisis - documentary, Robin Spry 1973 - co-producer with Normand Cloutier and Robin Spry
- Child, Part 1: Jamie, Ethan and Marlon: The First Two Months - documentary short, Robert Humble 1973 - producer
- Child, Part 2: Jamie, Ethan and Keir: 2-14 Months - documentary short, Robert Humble 1973 - producer
- Child, Part 3: Debbie and Robert: 12-24 Months - documentary short, Robert Humble 1974 - producer
- Mr. Symbol Man - documentary, Bruce Moir and Bob Kingsbury 1974 - co-producer with Frank Bagnall and Richard Mason
- The Players - documentary, Donald Brittain 1974 - producer
- Running Time - experimental film, Mort Ransen 1974 - co-producer with George Pearson
- Sananguagat: Inuit Masterworks - documentary short, Derek May 1974 - producer
- Thunderbirds in China - documentary, Les Rose 1974 - co-producer with Donald Brittain
- Waiting for Fidel - documentary, Michael Rubbo 1974 - co-producer with Michael Rubbo
- In Praise of Hands - documentary short, Donald Winkler 1975 - co-producer with Colin Low
- Descent - documentary short, Giles Walker and Paul Cown 1975 - co-producer with Desmond Dew
- The Forest Watchers - documentary short, Peter Raymont 1975 - producer
- Earthware - documentary short, Rick Raxlen and Donald Winkler 1975 - co-producer with Colin Low and Rick Raxlen
- Lumsden - documentary short, Peter Raymont 1975 - producer
- Hinchinbrook Diary - documentary short, Rick Raxlen 1975 - producer
- I Am an Old Tree - documentary, Michael Rubbo 1975 - co-producer with Michael Rubbo
- Face - short film, Robin Spry 1975 - co-producer with Robin Spry
- Cold Journey - documentary, Martin Defalco 1975 - co-editor with Torben Schioler
- Alberta Girls - documentary short, Malca Gillson and Tony Ianzelo 1975 - producer
- Metal Workers - documentary short, Robert Fortier and Donald Winkler 1975 - co-producer with Colin Low and Rick Raxlen
- Musicanada - documentary, Malca Gillson and Tony Ianzelo 1975 - producer
- No Way They Want to Slow Down - documentary short, Giles Walker 1975 - co-producer with Desmond Dew
- The Sword of the Lord - documentary, Giles Walker 1976 - co-producer with Desmond Dew
- Los Canadienses - documentary, Albert Kish 1976 - co-producer with Colin Low
- The Great Clean-Up - documentary, James Carney 1976 - producer
- Threads - documentary short, Donald Winkler and Anne Henderson 1976 - co-producer with Colin Low and Diane Beaudry
- Wax and Wool - documentary short, Donald Winkler and Rick Raxlen 1976 - co-producer with Colin Low and Rick Raxlen
- Blackwood - documentary short, Tony Ianzelo and Andy Thomson 1976 - producer
- Coaches - documentary, Paul Cown 1976 - producer
- A Pinto for the Prince - documentary short 1976 - Colin Low and John Spotton - producer
- River: Planet Earth - documentary short, Peter Raymont 1977 - producer
- You're Eating For Two - documentary short, Malca Gillson 1977 - producer
- Back Alley Blue - short film, Bill Reid 1977 - co-editor with David Wilson
- I Hate to Lose - documentary, Michael Rubbo 1977 - producer
- Child, Part 4: Kathy and Ian: Three-Year-Olds - documentary short, Robert Humble 1977 - producer
- I'll Go Again - documentary, Paul Cown 1977 - producer
- One Man - feature, Robin Spry 1977 - co-producer with Vladimir Valenta, James de Beaujeu Domville and Michael J. F. Scott
- Child, Part 5: 4 Years - 6 Years - documentary short, Robert Humble 1978 - co-producer with Dorothy Cortois
- An Easy Pill to Swallow - documentary short, Robert Lang 1978 - producer
- It Wasn't Easy - documentary, Nico Crama 1978 - co-producer with Henk Suèr
- Meditation in Motion - documentary short, Irene Angelico 1978 - producer
- ’round and ‘round - documentary, Barbara Greene 1978 - producer
- Tigers and Teddy Bears - documentary short, Michael Rubbo 1978 - producer
- Travel Log - experimental short, Donald Winkler 1978 - producer
- China: A Land Transformed - documentary, Tony Ianzelo and Boyce Richardson 1980 - producer
- North China Commune - documentary, Tony Ianzelo and Boyce Richardson 1980 - producer
- North China Factory - documentary, Tony Ianzelo and Boyce Richardson 1980 - producer
- Wuxing People's Commune - documentary, Tony Ianzelo and Boyce Richardson 1980 - producer
- Co Hoedeman, Animator - documentary short, Nico Crama 1980 - producer
- From the Ashes of War - documentary short, Michael McKennirey 1980 - co-producer with Nico Crama
- The Last Days of Living - documentary, Malca Gillson 1980 - producer
- The Lost Pharaoh: The Search for Akhenaten - documentary, Nicholas Kendall 1980 - co-producer with Nicholas Kendall
- Stages - documentary, Paul Cown 1980 - producer
- Earle Birney: Portrait of a Poet - documentary, Donald Winkler 1981 - producer
- Off the Wall - documentary, Derek May 1981 - producer
- Standing Alone - documentary, Colin Low 1982 - editor, producer
- F.R. Scott: Rhyme and Reason - documentary, Donald Winkler 1982 - producer
- Reflections on Suffering - documentary, Malca Gillson 1982 - producer
- Time for Caring - documentary, Malca Gillson 1982 - producer
- Singing: A Joy in Any Language - documentary, Malca Gillson and Tony Ianzelo 1983 - producer
- The Road to Patriation - documentary, Robert Duncan 1984 - co-producer with Malca Gillson, Jennifer Torrance and Robert Duncan
- Musical Magic: Gilbert and Sullivan in Stratford - documentary, Malca Gillson 1984 - producer

== Awards ==
Who Will Teach Your Child? (1948)

- Scholastic Teacher Magazine Annual Film Awards: Top-Ten List: Best 16mm Information Films of 1949
- 1st Canadian Film Awards, Ottawa: Best Theatrical Short, 1950

Science at Your Service (1949)

- 2nd Canadian Film Awards, Ottawa: Best Film, Non-Theatrical, Sponsored, 1953

Family Circles (1949)

- Cleveland Film Festival, Cleveland, Ohio: Best Film, Information: 1950
- 2nd Canadian Film Awards, Ottawa: First Prize, Non-theatrical, 1950
- Scholastic Teachers Magazine Annual Film Awards, New York: Top-Ten List of 16mm Information Films of 1949, 1950
- SODRE International Festival of Documentary and Experimental Films, Montevideo: Special Mention, Cultural Films, 1955

Teeth Are to Keep (1949)

- Venice Film Festival, Venice: Silver Medal, 1950
- La Plata International Children's Film Festival, La Plata: First Prize, Preventive Medicine, 1961

Feelings of Depression (1950)

- 3rd Canadian Film Awards, Ottawa: Genie Award for Best Non-Theatrical Film, 1951

A Friend at the Door (1950)

- 3rd Canadian Film Awards, Ottawa: Special Citation, Non-theatrical, 1951

Family Tree (1950)

- Salerno Film Festival, Salerno: First Prize – Grand Award, Best of All Entries, 1951
- 3rd Canadian Film Awards, Ottawa: Special Award for Outstanding Animation and Musical Score, 1951
- Rapallo International Film Festival, Rapallo: Second Prize, Art Films, 1957

Royal Journey (1951)

- 4th Canadian Film Awards, Toronto: Best Theatrical Feature, Documentary, 1952
- 6th British Academy Film Awards, London: BAFTA Award for Best Documentary, 1953

The Longhouse People (1951)

- 4th Canadian Film Awards, Toronto: Honourable Mention, Non-theatrical, 1952

Caribou Hunters (1951)

- International Exhibition of Big Game Hunting and Fishing Films, Düsseldorf: Bronze Medal, 1954

Breakdown (1951)

- Scholastic Teacher Magazine Annual Film Awards, New York: Outstanding 16mm Film of 1951, 1952
- International Review of Specialized Cinematography, Rome: Certificate of Honour, Film Production in General, 1955

Canada's Awakening North (1951)

- Venice Film Festival, Venice: First Prize, Geographical Films, 1951

Pen Point Percussion (1951)

- Venice Film Festival, Venice: Honourable Mention, Experimental Films, 1951

Fighting Forest Fires with Hand Tools (1951)

- Golden Reel International Film Festival, Film Council of America, New York: Recognition of Merit, Training, 1954

The Romance of Transportation in Canada (1952)

- 1953 Cannes Film Festival, Cannes: Award for Best Animation, 1953
- 5th Canadian Film Awards, Montreal: Honourable Mention, 1953
- 7th British Academy Film Awards, London: BAFTA Special Award, 1954
- 25th Academy Awards, Los Angeles: Nominee, Best Short Subject, Cartoons, 1953

Lismer (1952)

- Yorkton Film Festival, Yorkton: First Prize, Cultural, 1952

Age of the Beaver (1952)

- 5th Canadian Film Awards, Toronto: Honorable Mention, Non-Theatrical, 1953

Varley (1953)

- Boston International Film Festival, Boston: Award of Merit, Arts, 1953

Paul Tomkowicz: Street-Railway Switchman (1953)

- International Short Film Festival Oberhausen, Oberhausen: First Prize, 1958
- Edinburgh International Film Festival, Edinburgh: Diploma of Merit, Cultural, 1958
- International Filmfestival Mannheim-Heidelberg, Mannheim: Special Commendation of the Jury, 1958

Corral (1954)

- Venice Film Festival, Venice: First Prize, Documentary Films, 1954
- Durban International Film Festival, Durban: Second Prize/Bronze Medal, Documentary, 1954
- Edinburgh International Film Festival, Edinburgh: Diploma of Merit, Arts, 1954
- Golden Reel International Film Festival, Film Council of America, New York: Recognition of Merit, 1955
- 7th Canadian Film Awards, Toronto: Special Mention, Non-Theatrical Short, 1955

Physical Regions of Canada (1954)

- Golden Reel International Film Festival, Film Council of America, New York: Recognition of Merit, Classroom Films (Junior and Senior High School), 1955

Riches of the Earth (1954)

- 7th Canadian Film Awards, Toronto: Best Film, Non-Theatrical Short, 1955
- International Survey of Scientific and Didactic Films, Padua: First Prize for Best Film, 1956

One Little Indian (1954)

- National Committee on Films for Safety, Chicago: First Prize, Bronze Plaque, Traffic & Transportation, 1955
- Golden Reel International Film Festival, Film Council of America, New York: Recognition of Merit, 1955
- Kootenay Film Festival, Nelson, British Columbia: Certificate of Merit, Second Award, Artistic Achievement, 1955
- 7th Canadian Film Awards, Toronto: Honorable Mention, Non-Theatrical, 1955
- Rapallo International Film Festival, Rapallo: Great Cup of the Province of Genoa, 1956
- Rapallo International Film Festival, Rapallo: First Prize & Silver Medal, Abstract Films, 1956

A Thousand Million Years (1954)

- Venice Film Festival, Venice: Honourable Mention, Scientific Films, 1954

The Homeless Ones (1954)

- 7th Canadian Film Awards: Honourable Mention, Non-theatrical Sponsored, 1955

Iron from the North (1955)

- Columbus International Film & Animation Festival, Columbus, Ohio: Award of Merit, Information and Educational, 1956

The Jolifou Inn (1955)

- Yorkton Film Festival, Yorkton: Golden Sheaf Award, Best Film, Creative Arts, 1956
- 8th Canadian Film Awards, Stratford, Ontario: Honorable Mention, Theatrical Short, 1956
- Kootenay Film Festival, Nelson, British Columbia: First Achievement Award, 1957
- Ibero-American-Filipino Documentary Film Contest, Bilbao: Best Film of an Educational and Cultural Character, 1959
- Ibero-American-Filipino Documentary Film Contest, Bilbao: Special Prize, 1959

To Serve the Mind (1955)

- Golden Reel International Film Festival, Film Council of America, Chicago: Silver Reel, Health, 1956

Gold (1955)

- Edinburgh International Film Festival, Edinburgh: Diploma of Merit, 1955
- 8th Canadian Film Awards, Stratford, Ontario: Gold Award, Theatrical Short, 1956

City of Gold (1957)

- 1957 Cannes Film Festival, Cannes: First Prize, Documentary, 1957
- Cork International Film Festival, Cork, Ireland: First Prize - Statuette of St. Finbarr, General Interest 1957
- Canadian Film Awards, Toronto: Genie Award, Film of the Year 1958
- Canadian Film Awards, Toronto: Genie Award, Award of Merit 1958
- Vancouver International Film Festival, Vancouver: First Prize, Documentary 1958
- Yorkton Film Festival, Yorkton, Saskatchewan: Golden Sheaf Award, Best Film, General 1958
- International Festival of Mountain and Exploration Films, Trento: Gold Medal 1958
- Chicago Festival of Contemporary Arts, University of Illinois Chicago: Documentary Prize 1958
- International Festival of Films on People and Countries, La Spezia: Gold Caravelle, 2nd Prize 1958
- SODRE International Festival of Documentary and Experimental Films, Montevideo: Honourable Mention 1958
- Robert J. Flaherty Film Awards, City College Institute of Film Techniques: Honourable Mention, 1958
- Ibero-American-Filipino Documentary Film Contest, Bilbao: First Prize, 1959
- American Film and Video Festival, New York: Blue Ribbon, History & Biography, 1959
- Festival of Experimental and Documentary Films, Santiago, Chile: Honourable Mention 1960
- Festival dei Popoli, Florence: Gold Medal, 1960
- Columbus International Film & Animation Festival, Columbus, Ohio: Chris Award, First Prize 1960
- 30th Academy Awards, Los Angeles: Nominee, Short Subject, Live Action, 1958

Canadian Profile (1957)

- 10th Canadian Film Awards, Toronto: Award of Merit, Non-Theatrical, General Information, 1958

Blood and Fire (1958)

- 11th Canadian Film Awards, Toronto: Award of Merit, TV Information, 1959
- Ohio State Radio and TV Awards, Columbus, Ohio: First Prize, 1960

The Changing Forest (1958)

- International Review of Specialized Cinematography, Rome: Silver Medal, 1959
- Scholastic Teachers Magazine Annual Film Awards, New York: Outstanding Scholastic Teacher's Award, 1960

The Living Stone (1958)

- International Filmfestival Mannheim-Heidelberg, Mannheim: Special Commendation, 1959
- Winnipeg Film Council Annual Film Festival, Winnipeg: Best Canadian Film, Short Subject, 1959
- Locarno Film Festival, Locarno: Diploma of Honour, 1959
- 11th Canadian Film Awards, Toronto: Award of Merit, General Information, 1959
- Robert J. Flaherty Film Awards, City College Institute of Film Techniques: Honourable Mention, 1959
- American Film and Video Festival, New York: Blue Ribbon, Graphic Arts, Sculpture and Architecture, 1960
- Rapallo International Film Festival, Rapallo: Special Prize, Cup of the Minister of Tourism and Entertainment for Best Foreign Film, 1960
- Rapallo International Film Festival, Rapallo: Second Prize, Silver Cup of the Province of Genoa, 1960
- Festival of Tourist and Folklore Films, Brussels: CIDALC Medal of Honour, 1960
- SODRE International Festival of Documentary and Experimental Films, Montevideo: Honourable Mention 1960
- International Festival of Films on People and Countries, La Spezia: Silver Cup for the Most Popular Film of the Festival, 1967
- International Festival of Films on People and Countries, La Spezia: Medal for Best Ethnological Film, 1967
- International Maritime and Exploration Film Festival, Toulon: Ergo Prize of the Presidency of the Republic, 1969
- 31st Academy Awards, Los Angeles: Nominee: Best Documentary Short Film, 1958

City Out of Time (1959)

- Vancouver International Film Festival, Vancouver: Special Diploma, Fine Arts, 1960

Fishermen (1959)

- South African International Film Festival, Bloemfontein: First Prize, Documentary, 1960
- International Agricultural Film Competition, Berlin: Third Prize - Bronze Ear of Grain, 1960
- Columbus International Film & Animation Festival, Columbus, Ohio: Chris Certificate, 1960

Radiation (1959)

- 12th Canadian Film Awards, Toronto: Certificate of Merit, Training and Instruction, 1960

The Back-Breaking Leaf (1959)

- 1960 Cannes Film Festival, Cannes: Eurovision Grand Prize, Documentary Films, 1960
- American Film and Video Festival, New York: Blue Ribbon, Agriculture, Conservation and Natural Resources, 1961
- International Labour and Industrial Film Festival, Antwerp: Diploma of Merit, Films Dealing with the Problems of People at Work, 1963

Pangnirtung (1959)

- Okanagan Film Festival, Kelowna: First Prize, 1960

The Cars in Your Life (1960)

- American Film and Video Festival, New York: Blue Ribbon, Citizen, Government & City Planning, 1963

Circle of the Sun (1960)

- 14th Canadian Film Awards: Genie Award for Best Film, General Information, 1962
- Yorkton Film Festival, Yorkton: Golden Sheaf Award, First Prize, 1962
- Festival of Tourist and Folklore Films, Brussels: Best Film on Folklore 1962
- La Plata International Children's Film Festival, La Plata: Silver Oak Leaf, First Prize, Documentary 1962
- Electronic, Nuclear and Teleradio Cinematographic Review, Rome: First Prize, Tourist Films 1962
- SODRE International Festival of Documentary and Experimental Films, Montevideo: Honorable Mention, 1962
- Victoria Film Festival, Victoria: Best Film, 1963
- International Tourism Film Festival, Tarbes: Diploma of Honour and Trophy 1967

Universe (1960)

- Cannes Film Festival, Cannes: Jury Prize for Exceptional Animation Quality, 1960
- Cannes Film Festival, Cannes: Technical Mention of the Commission Supérieure Technique du Cinéma Français, 1960
- International Festival of Scientific and Technical Films, Belgrade: Diploma of Honour, 1960
- Yorkton Film Festival, Yorkton: Golden Sheaf Award, Best Film of the Festival, 1960
- Vancouver International Film Festival, Vancouver: First Prize, Documentary, 1960
- Vancouver International Film Festival, Vancouver: Diploma, Scientific Films, 1960
- Stratford Film Festival, Stratford, Ontario: Special Commendation, 1960
- Cork International Film Festival, Cork: First Prize – Diploma of Merit, 1960
- Edinburgh International Film Festival, Edinburgh: Diploma of Merit, Science, 1960
- 14th British Academy Film Awards, London: BAFTA Award for Best Animated Film, 1961
- 13th Canadian Film Awards: Genie Award for Film of the Year, 1961
- 13th Canadian Film Awards: Genie Award for Best Theatrical Short, 1961
- Salerno Film Festival, Salerno: First Prize – Documentary, 1961
- American Film and Video Festival, New York: Blue Ribbon, Science and Mathematics, 1961
- Columbus International Film & Animation Festival, Columbus, Ohio: Chris Award, Information/Education, 1961
- Rapallo International Film Festival, Rapallo: Cup of the Minister of Tourism and Entertainment, 1961
- Philadelphia International Festival of Short Films, Philadelphia: Award for Exceptional Merit, 1961
- Mar del Plata International Film Festival, Mar del Plata: Grand Prize, 1962
- International Festival of Educational Films, Mar del Plata: Best Documentary, 1962
- La Plata International Children's Festival, La Plata: Silver Oak Leaf, First Prize, Scientific Films, 1962
- Scientific Film Festival, Caracas: Award of Merit, 1963
- Scholastic Teacher Magazine Annual Film Awards, New York: Award of Merit, 1963
- International Educational Film Festival, Tehran: Golden Delfan, First Prize, Scientific Films, 1964
- Educational Film Library Association of America, New York: Nomination, 10 Best Films of the Decade List, 1968
- 33rd Academy Awards, Los Angeles: Nominee: Best Documentary Short Subject, 1961

A is for Architecture (1960)

- Yorkton Film Festival, Yorkton: Golden Sheaf Award, First Prize, 1960
- 12th Canadian Film Awards, Toronto: Genie Award for Best Film, General Information, 1960
- Ibero-American-Filipino Documentary Film Contest, Bilbao: Special CIDALC Prize, Silver Medal, 1960
- International Exhibition of Electronics, Nuclear Energy, Radio, Television and Cinema, Trieste: Silver Cup, 1960
- Rapallo International Film Festival, Rapallo: Third Prize - Silver Cup and Medal, 1960
- Yorkton Film Festival, Yorkton: Certificate of Merit, 1960
- Columbus International Film & Animation Festival, Columbus, Ohio: Chris Award, First Prize, 1962

Microscopic Fungi (1960)

- International Exhibition of Scientific Film, Buenos Aires: Diploma of Honor, 1964

Life in the Woodlot (1960)

- Salerno Film Festival, Salerno: Silver Cup of the Province of Salerno, 1961
- 13th Canadian Film Awards, Toronto: Best Film, Films for Children, 1961

Roughnecks: The Story of Oil Drillers (1960)

- San Sebastián International Film Festival, San Sebastián: First Prize, 1960
- Golden Gate International Film Festival, San Francisco: Silver Plaque for Best Industrial Film, 1960
- International Industrial Film Festival, Turin: First Prize in Category, 1961
- Columbus International Film & Animation Festival, Columbus, Ohio: Chris Certificate, Business and Industry, General Information for Public, 1961
- Yorkton Film Festival, Yorkton: First Prize, Industry and Agriculture, 1962
- HEMISFILM, San Antonio TX: Best Film, 1972

Lonely Boy (1961)

- Festival dei Popoli, Florence: Gold Medal, 1960
- 1962 Cannes Film Festival, Cannes: Honorable Mention, Documentary Works, 1962
- International Days of Short Films, Tours: Special Jury Prize, 1962
- Edinburgh International Film Festival, Edinburgh: Honorable Mention, 1962
- Vancouver International Film Festival, Vancouver: First Prize, Documentary, 1962
- Ann Arbor Film Festival, Ann Arbor, Michigan: The Purchase Prize, 1963
- International Short Film Festival Oberhausen, Oberhausen: First Prize, Documentary, 1963
- 15th Canadian Film Awards, Montreal: Film of the Year, 1963
- 15th Canadian Film Awards, Montreal: Best Film, General Information, 1963

Cattle Ranch (1961)

- Locarno Film Festival, Locarno: Diploma of Honour, 1961
- Vancouver International Film Festival, Vancouver: Honourable Mention, Science and Agriculture, 1961
- International Festival of Films for Television, Rome: First Prize, Gold Plaque, Documentary, 1963
- Congrès du spectacle, Montreal: Best Documentary, 1966

Do You Know the Milky Way? (1961)

- International Days of Short Films, Tours: Special Jury Prize, 1961
- Columbus International Film & Animation Festival, Columbus, Ohio: Chris Award, Experimental, 1962

Very Nice, Very Nice (1961)

- 34th Academy Awards – Nominee, Academy Award for Best Live Action Short Film, 1962

The Days of Whiskey Gap (1961)

- 1961 Cannes Film Festival, Cannes: Grand Prize, Documentary, 1961
- Canadian Historical Association, Toronto: Certificate of Merit "for outstanding contribution to local history in Canada", 1962
- Vancouver International Film Festival, Vancouver: Honorable Mention, Sociology, 1962

Runner (1962)

- Golden Gate International Film Festival, San Francisco: Honorable Mention, Film as Art, 1963
- Midwest Film Festival, University of Chicago, Chicago: Donald Perry Award, 1963

My Financial Career (1962)

- Golden Gate International Film Festival, San Francisco: First Prize, Animated Film, 1962
- American Film and Video Festival, New York: Blue Ribbon, Literature in Films, 1964
- 36th Academy Awards, Los Angeles: Nominee, Best Short Subject, Cartoons, 1963

The Joy of Winter (1962)

- Locarno Film Festival, Locarno: Diploma of Honour, 1962
- International Cinema Contest, Films for Children and Teenagers, Gijón: Best Film for Children, 1966
- International Cinema Contest, Films for Children and Teenagers, Gijón: Best Television Film, 1966

Kindergarten (1962)

- International Filmfestival Mannheim-Heidelberg, Mannheim: Special Mention of the International Jury, 1963
- International Educational Film Festival, Tehran: Bronze Delfan, Third Prize, Educational Films, 1964

The Living Machine (1962)

- Columbus International Film & Animation Festival, Columbus, Ohio: Chris Award, Public Information, 1963
- Villeurbanne Short Film Festival, Villeurbanne: Diploma of Honor, 1963

The Climates of North America (1962)

- 15th Canadian Film Awards, Montreal: Certificate of Merit, Films for Children, 1963
- Yorkton Film Festival, Yorkton: Golden Sheaf Award, First Prize, Science, 1964

21-87 (1963)

- Ann Arbor Film Festival, Ann Arbor, Michigan: First Prize, 1964
- Palo Alto Filmmakers’ Festival, Palo Alto: Second Prize, 1964
- Midwest Film Festival, University of Chicago, Chicago: Most Popular Film, 1964

Pipers and A’ (1963)

- Canadian Tourist Association Awards, Toronto: First Prize, Canuck Award, 1964

The Great Toy Robbery (1963)

- Cork International Film Festival, Cork: St. Finbarr Statuette, First Prize, Animated Film and Cartoon, 1963
- Belgrade Documentary and Short Film Festival, Belgrade: Diploma, 1964
- Landers Associates Annual Awards, Los Angeles: Award of Merit, 1969

Sky (1963)

- Columbus International Film & Animation Festival, Columbus, Ohio: Chris Award, Special Fields, 1964
- Jubilee International Film Festival, Swift Current: First Prize, Natural Sciences, 1964

A Christmas Fantasy (1963)

- Columbus International Film & Animation Festival, Columbus, Ohio: Chris Certificate 1964

I Know an Old Lady Who Swallowed a Fly (1963)

- Chicago International Film Festival, Chicago: Certificate of Merit – Cartoons, 1965
- Zlín Film Festival/International Film Festival for Children and Youth, Gottwaldov, Czechoslovakia: Diploma of Merit, 1965
- Santa Barbara Children's Film Festival, Santa Barbara, California: Second Satellite Award, Short Entertainment, 1966

Christmas Cracker (1963)

- Golden Gate International Film Festival, San Francisco: First Prize, Best Animated Short, 1964
- Electronic, Nuclear and Teleradio Cinematographic Review, Rome: Grand Prize for Technique, Films for Children, 1965
- Electronic, Nuclear and Teleradio Cinematographic Review, Rome: Grand Prize for Animation Technique, 1965
- Landers Associates Annual Awards, Los Angeles: Award of Merit, 1965
- Film Centrum Foundation Film Show, Naarden: Silver Squirrel, Second Prize 1966
- Philadelphia International Festival of Short Films, Philadelphia: Award of Exceptional Merit, 1967
- 37th Academy Awards, Los Angeles: Nominee: Best Short Subject – Cartoons, 1965

Legault's Place (1964)

- Chicago International Film Festival, Chicago: Diploma of Merit, 1965
- Melbourne Film Festival, Melbourne: Diploma of Merit, 1966

The Edge of the Barrens (1964)

- Yorkton Film Festival, Yorkton: Golden Sheaf Award for Best Film of the Festival, 1964
- Yorkton Film Festival, Yorkton: First Prize, Natural History, 1964
- Venice Film Festival, Venice: Second Prize, Children's Films, 1964
- Weyburn Film Festival, Weyburn: First Prize, 1965
- International Exhibition of Scientific Film, Buenos Aires: Special Mention, 1966

Nobody Waved Goodbye (1964)

- 18th British Academy Film Awards, London: BAFTA Award for Best Documentary, 1965
- International Filmfestival Mannheim-Heidelberg, Mannheim: CIDALC Award, 1964
- International Film Festival at Addis Ababa, Addis Ababa, Ethiopia: Third Prize, Feature Film, 1966
- Salerno Film Festival, Salerno: First Prize, 1968
- Toronto International Film Festival, Toronto: 9th Place, Canada's Ten-Best Films, 1984

Above the Horizon (1964)

- International Survey of Scientific and Didactic Films, Padua: First Prize, Didactic Films, 1965
- Australian and New Zealand Association for the Advancement of Science (ANZAAS), Sydney: Orbit Award, 1966
- 18th Canadian Film Awards, Montreal: Best Film for Children, 1966
- International Exhibition of Scientific Film, Buenos Aires: Diploma of Honor, 1966
- International Scientific Film Festival, Lyon: Honorable Mention for Popularization of a Scientific Subject, 1969
- Electronic, Nuclear and Teleradio Cinematographic Review, Rome: Best Film in the Scientific Category, 1970

Free Fall (1964)

- Golden Gate International Film Festival, San Francisco: Award of Merit, 1964
- Montreal International Film Festival, Montreal: Honorable Mention, Shorts, 1964

Eskimo Artist: Kenojuak (1964)

- 18th British Academy Film Awards, London: BAFTA Award for Best Short Film, 1964
- Venice Film Festival, Venice: Special Mention, 1964
- Cork International Film Festival, Cork: Statuette of St. Finbarr - First Prize, Art Films, 1964
- Vancouver International Film Festival, Vancouver: Certificate of Merit, 1964
- Festival of Tourist and Folklore Films, Brussels: Gold Medal - First Prize, 1965
- Melbourne International Film Festival, Melbourne: Silver Boomerang - Second Prize, 1965
- International Exhibition of Scientific Film, Buenos Aires: Second Prize in Category, 1965
- Columbus International Film & Animation Festival, Columbus, Ohio: Chris Award, Education & Information, 1966
- Panama International Film Festival, Panama City: Grand Prize for Best Documentary, 1966
- Tokyo International Film Festival, Tokyo: Certificate of Merit, 1966
- Thessaloniki International Film Festival, Thessaloniki: First Prize, Foreign Film, 1967
- Festival of Cultural Films, La Felguera: Silver Plaque, 1967
- American Film and Video Festival, New York: First Prize, Graphic Arts, Sculpture and Architecture, 1967
- FIBA International Festival of Buenos Aires, Buenos Aires: Diploma of Honor, 1968
- Philadelphia International Festival of Short Films, Philadelphia: Award of Exceptional Merit, 1971
- 37th Academy Awards, Los Angeles: Nominee: Best Documentary Short Subject, 1965

Jet Pilot (1964)

- Columbus International Film & Animation Festival, Columbus, Ohio: Chris Award, First Prize, Information/Education, 1964

The Hutterites (1964)

- Montreal International Film Festival, Montreal: First Prize, Shorts, 1964
- Columbus International Film & Animation Festival, Columbus, Ohio: Chris Award, First Prize, Religion, 1964
- Yorkton Film Festival, Yorkton: Golden Sheaf Award, First Prize, Human Relations, 1964
- Melbourne Film Festival, Melbourne: Honorable Mention, 1964
- American Film and Video Festival, New York: Blue Ribbon, Doctrinal and Denominational Topics, 1965
- Landers Associates Awards, Los Angeles: Award of Merit, 1965
- Festival dei Popoli/International Film Festival on Social Documentary, Florence: Second Prize, 1965

An Essay on Science (1964)

- International Industrial Film Festival, London: Third Prize, General Information, 1964
- Australian and New Zealand Association for the Advancement of Science (ANZAAS), Sydney: Special Mention, 1964
- International Exhibition of Scientific Film, Buenos Aires: Diploma of Honor, 1966

High Steel (1965)

- Cork International Film Festival, Cork: Bronze Statuette of St. Finbarr - First Prize, Documentary, 1966
- Locarno Film Festival, Locarno: Diploma of Honour, 1967
- Kraków Film Festival, Kraków: Diploma of Honour, 1967
- Melbourne Film Festival, Melbourne: Diploma of Merit, 1967
- International Days of Short Films, Tours: Prize of the Cine-Clubs, 1967
- Berlin International Film Festival, Berlin: Special Youth Prize, 1967

Stravinsky (1965)

- Montreal International Film Festival, Montreal: Special Mention, Short Films, 1965

Island Observed (1966)

- International Exhibition of Scientific Film, Buenos Aires: Special Mention, 1967

Helicopter Canada (1966)

- 19th Canadian Film Awards, Toronto: Best Film, General Information, 1967
- 19th Canadian Film Awards, Toronto: Special Prize: “For providing a superbly appropriate and inspiring opportunity for Canadians to view their country in the Centennial Year”, 1967
- Canadian Travel Film Awards, Toronto: First Prize, 1967
- International Travel Documentary Film Festival, New Delhi: Special Prize, 1967
- Adelaide International Film Festival, Adelaide: Diploma, 1969
- 39th Academy Awards, Los Angeles: Nominee: Best Documentary Feature, 1967

The Forest (1966)

- Cork International Film Festival, Cork: First Prize – Certificate of Merit, Industrial Films, 1966
- Yorkton Film Festival, Yorkton: Golden Sheaf Award, Best Film, Industry and Agriculture 1967

Poen (1967)

- Zinebi - Bilbao International Documentary and Short Film Festival, Bilbao: Bronze Miqueldi, 1968
- International Short Film Festival Oberhausen, Oberhausen: Diploma, 1968

Danny and Nicky (1969)

- Canadian Association for the Mentally Retarded National Symposium, London, Ontario: Citation “In recognition of the educational contribution in the mental health field", 1969
- Conference on Children, Washington DC: Certificate of Merit, 1970
- Rio Cine Festival, Rio de Janeiro: Third Prize - Jacarandah Wood Trophy, Silver Plaque, Documentary, 1971

Mrs. Ryan's Drama Class (1969)

- Conference on Children, Washington DC: Certificate of Merit, 1970

Falling from Ladders (1969)

- Philadelphia International Festival of Short Films, Philadelphia: Award for Exceptional Merit, 1971

Untouched and Pure (1970)

- Chicago International Film Festival, Chicago: Silver Hugo, Education, 1971

Prologue (1969)

- 23rd British Academy Film Awards, London: BAFTA Award for Best Documentary, 1970
- Film Critics and Journalists Association of Ceylon, Colombo: First Prize, 1970

Half-Half-Three-Quarters-Full (1970)

- International Week of Nautical Cinema, Palma: Silver Plate, First Prize, Best Short in Category, 1972
- CIDALC International Sport Film Festival, Reims: President of the Republic Award, 1972
- International Review of Maritime Documentary / International Film, TV Film and Documentary Film Market (MIFED), Milan: Festival Trophy, 1972
- International Sports Film Festival, Cortina d'Ampezzo: Silver Medal given by the Italian National Olympic Committee, 1972
- British International Sport Film and Television Festival (Videosport), Milton Keynes: Judges’ Award, 1975

Espolio (1970)

- Columbus International Film & Animation Festival, Columbus, Ohio: Chris Statuette, Religion and Ethics, 1971
- Melbourne International Film Festival, Melbourne: Diploma of Merit, 1971
- American Film and Video Festival, New York: Red Ribbon, 1971
- Hawaii Film Festival, Honolulu: Third Prize, 1972

November (1970)

- Melbourne International Film Festival, Melbourne: Special Prize, Silver Boomerang, 1972

Legend (1970)

- 22nd Canadian Film Awards, Toronto: Best Film, Arts and Experimental, 1970
- American Film and Video Festival, New York: Red Ribbon, 1971

Pillar of Wisdom (1970)

- Cork International Film Festival, Cork: St. Finbarr Statuette, First Prize, Documentary and General Interest, 1971

Sad Song of Yellow Skin (1970)

- 24th British Academy Film Awards, London: BAFTA Award for Best Documentary, 1971
- Melbourne International Film Festival, Melbourne: Silver Boomerang, Best Film, 1971
- HEMISFILM, San Antonio TX: Best Film, 1971
- Festival of World Television, Los Angeles: Best Documentary, 1971
- American Film and Video Festival, New York: Blue Ribbon, 1971
- American Film and Video Festival, New York: Emily Award, 1971
- 22nd Canadian Film Awards, Toronto: Special Award for Reportage, 1970
- Atlanta Film Festival: Gold Medal, Special Jury Award, 1971

This is a Photograph (1971)

- 24th Canadian Film Awards, Toronto: Genie Award for Best Theatrical Short Film, 1972
- Venice Film Festival, Venice: Silver Medal, 1973

Norman Jewison, Film Maker (1971)

- Chicago International Film Festival, Chicago: Silver Hugo, Documentary, Local Broadcast, 1972
- Melbourne International Film Festival, Melbourne: Special Prize, Silver Boomerang, 1972

Wet Earth and Warm People (1971)

- Golden Gate International Film Festival, San Francisco: Honourable Mention, Sociological Studies of Specific Groups or Lifestyles in a Society, 1972
- Atlanta Film Festival, Atlanta: Bronze Medal, Feature, 1972
- Melbourne International Film Festival, Melbourne: Diploma of Merit, 1972

The Mechanical Knee (1971)

- International Festival of Red Cross and Health Films, Varna, Bulgaria: Silver Medal in Category, 1973

The Sea (1971)

- 23rd Canadian Film Awards, Toronto: Genie Award for Best Documentary Under 30 minutes, 1971
- International Film Festival of Man, Air, Water, Versailles: First Prize of the Festival, 1972
- International Review of Maritime Documentary / International Film, TV Film and Documentary Film Market (MIFED), Milan: Jury Award - Gold Medal of the President of the Republic, 1972
- Melbourne International Film Festival, Melbourne: Diploma of Merit, 1972
- International Week of Nautical Cinema, Palma: Gold Anchovy, 1974
- International Documentary Film Days on the Environment, Ouistreham-Riva-Bella: Gold Medal and Grand Prize of the President of the Republic, 1974

Pandora (1971)

- Philadelphia International Festival of Short Films, Philadelphia: Award for Exceptional Merit, 1971
- Atlanta Film Festival, Atlanta: Silver Medal, Experimental Live Action, 1972

The Sloane Affair (1972)

- 25th Canadian Film Awards, Montreal: Genie Award for Best Television Drama, 1973

The Huntsman (1972)

- Cork International Film Festival, Cork: St. Finbarr Statuette, First Place, Short Fiction Film, 1972
- FIBA International Festival of Buenos Aires, Buenos Aires: Honorable Mention, 1974

Centaur (1972)

- Yorkton Film Festival, Yorkton: Golden Sheaf Award for Best Sports and Recreation Film, 1973
- Chantilly Festival, ‘The Horse in Cinema’, Chantilly, Oise: Grand Festival Prize, 1980

Accident (1973)

- American Film and Video Festival, New York: Red Ribbon, Mental Health, 1975

Coming Home (1973)

- 25th Canadian Film Awards, Montreal: Genie Award for Best Theatrical Documentary, 1973

The Man Who Can't Stop (1973)

- Chicago International Film Festival, Chicago: Certificate of Merit, 1974

Action: The October Crisis of 1970 (1973)

- Visions du Réel, Nyon: Grand Prize for Best Documentary, 1975
- Chicago International Film Festival, Chicago: Silver Plaque, Feature Film, Documentary, 1975

Sananguagat: Inuit Masterworks (1974)

- Festival international du film sur l'art, Paris: Grand Prize, 1975
- International Tourism Film Festival, Tarbes: Award of Merit, 1975

In Praise of Hands (1974)

- International Craft Film Festival, New York: Award of Merit, 1976
- International Festival of Television Programs of Folk Crafts (RADUGA), Moscow: Diploma for Impressive Transmission of Deep Thought of Unity of the Sources of Folk Creativity, 1979

Waiting for Fidel (1974)

- American Film and Video Festival, New York: Red Ribbon, World Concerns, 1976

Mr. Symbol Man (1974)

- Australian Film Awards: Sydney: Golden Reel, Documentary, 1975
- Golden Gate International Film Festival, San Francisco: Bronze Reel, Documentary, 1975
- International Film Festival on Education, Mexico City: First Prize, Didactic Films, 1976
- Melbourne International Film Festival, Melbourne: Second Prize - Silver Boomerang and Victorian Government Prize, 1978

Descent (1975)

- Banff Mountain Film Festival, Banff, Alberta: Best Film of the Festival, 1977
- Banff Mountain Film Festival, Banff, Alberta: Best Film Produced by a Canadian, 1977

Musicanada (1975)

- Golden Gate International Film Festival, San Francisco: Special Jury Award, 1976

Blackwood (1976)

- Festival international du film sur l'art, Paris: Grand Prize for the Quality of the Image, 1977
- Festival of Tourist and Folklore Films, Brussels: Prize of the Principality of Monaco for the Best Film Evocating the Past of a Region by the Means of Art, 1977
- Yorkton Film Festival, Yorkton: Golden Sheaf Award, Best Short Film, 1977
- 49th Academy Awards, Los Angeles: Nominee, Best Documentary Short Subject, 1977

Los Canadienses (1976)

- 30th British Academy Film Awards, London: BAFTA Award for Best Documentary, 1977
- Chicago International Film Festival, Chicago: Silver Hugo Award, 1977
- Yorkton Film Festival, Yorkton: Golden Sheaf Award, Best Documentary, 1977
- Melbourne Film Festival: TV Award for Best Film Made for TV, 1977
- American Film and Video Festival, New York: Blue Ribbon, International History and Culture, 1977
- International Filmfestival Mannheim-Heidelberg, Mannheim: Special Mention from the Fédération internationale de la presse cinématographique, 1976
- International Filmfestival Mannheim-Heidelberg, Mannheim: Special Prize for the Best Film, 1976

One Man (1977)

- ACTRA Awards, Montreal: Film of the Year, 1978
- Film Festival Antwerpen, Antwerp: Second Best Film of the Festival, 1978
- Film Festival Antwerpen, Antwerp: Honorable Mention by the Press Jury, 1978

I'll Go Again (1977)

- Yorkton Film Festival, Yorkton: Golden Sheaf Award for Best Sports and Recreation Film, 1977
- International Sports Film Festival, Budapest: First Jury Award, 1977

Travel Log (1978)

- Yorkton Film Festival, Yorkton: Golden Sheaf Award for Best Experimental Film, 1979
- Cork International Film Festival, Cork: Certificate of Merit, 1979
- Kraków Film Festival, Kraków: Silver Dragon, 1979
- Melbourne International Film Festival, Melbourne: Special Award - Silver Boomerang, 1980

Meditation in Motion (1978)

- Dance on Camera Festival, New York: Certificate of Merit, 1980

An Easy Pill to Swallow (1978)

- Columbus International Film & Animation Festival, Columbus, Ohio: Chris Bronze Plaque, Health and Medicine, 1980

The Last Days of Living (1980)

- Chicago International Film Festival, Chicago: Gold Plaque, Social Issues, 1980
- Golden Gate International Film Festival, San Francisco: Honorable Mention, Honorable Mention, 1980
- HEMA (Health Education Media Association) Film Festival, Philadelphia: Best of Show, 1981
- Columbus International Film & Animation Festival, Columbus, Ohio: Chris Award, Bronze Plaque, 1981
- Medikinale, Marburg: Gold Medal, Specialized Information Films, 1982
- Medikinale, Marburg: Gold Medal, Grand Prize of the University of Marburg, 1982

North China Commune (1980)

- Columbus International Film & Animation Festival, Columbus, Ohio - Chris Bronze Plaque, Social Studies, 1980

Standing Alone (1982)

- HEMISFILM, San Antonio TX: Bronze Medallion for Best Long Documentary, 1983
- International Film Festival for Children and Young People, Vancouver: Certificate of Merit, 1983

Time for Caring (1982)

- International Rehabilitation Film Festival, New York: Certificate of Merit, 1983
