= Malca Gillson =

Canadian filmmaker (1926–2010)

- Born: 1926; Yorkton, Saskatchewan
- Died: June 10, 2010 (aged 83–84); Toronto, Ontario
- Occupations: Composer, editor, director
- Years active: 1954–1991

Malca Gillson (1926-2010) was a Canadian filmmaker with the National Film Board of Canada, and one of the first women to join the NFB in a non-junior position. She was a multi-tasker, acting as composer, sound editor, editor, producer and director. She is best known for her ground-breaking trilogy about end-of-life care: The Last Days of Living, Reflections on Suffering and Time for Caring.

== Early life ==
Gillson was born Malca Laskin in Yorkton, Saskatchewan, to Bures T. Laskin and Florence Natonson. Hers was a prominent family; her father was a four-term mayor of Humboldt, Saskatchewan; her uncle Saul Laskin became the first mayor of Thunder Bay; her other paternal uncle, Bora Laskin, became the 14th Chief Justice of Canada.

== Career ==
Gillson joined the NFB in 1955, by which time she was married to NFB cameraman Denis Gillson; they would divorce, but she kept the name for the rest of her life. At the time, most female recruits were negative cutters and secretaries; she was hired as a composer, then placed in the sound department and went on to do the sound and/or music for several notable films, including the BAFTA-winning Buster Keaton Rides Again (1965), and Oscar nominee Helicopter Canada (1966).

By 1971, Gillson was a film editor and, in 1975, she began to direct. Her films, including Musicanada (1975), Alberta Girls (1975) and Canada Vignettes: The Music Makers (1975) all involved music and musicians. In 1979, her attention turned to end-of-life issues and she filmed three documentaries at Montreal’s Royal Victoria Hospital: The Last Days of Living (1980), Reflections on Suffering (1982) and Time for Caring (1982). The Last Days of Living, shot at the hospital’s palliative care unit, was the first film to truthfully bring the subject of death to professionals and the public; it is regarded as an essential film for healthcare professionals, volunteers and the public at large.

Gillson retired from the NFB in 1980 and died in Toronto in 2010.

== Filmography ==
- Eye Witness No. 88 - documentary short, Grant Crabtree and Hector Lemieux 1955 - music
- Lobsters Are a Community Affair - documentary short, Donald Fraser 1955 - music
- Eye Witness No. 98 - documentary short, Tim Wilson and Hector Lemieux 1957 - sound editor
- Bridge Under the Ocean - documentary short, Raymond Garceau 1957 - sound editor
- Wildlife of the Rocky Mountains - documentary short, William H. Carrick 1958 - music editor
- Security: Espionage - documentary short, Stanley Clish 1958 - co-sound editor with Victor Merrill
- The Responsibilities of Freedom - documentary short, Ian MacNeill 1958 - sound editor
- Setting Fires for Science - documentary short, Donald Brittain 1958 - co-sound editor with Karl Duplessis
- Stigma - short film, Stanley Jackson 1958 - sound editor
- Trans Canada Summer - documentary, Ronald Dick 1958 - music editor
- The Clerk - short film, Allan Wargon 1958 - co-sound editor with Kathleen Shannon
- The Department Manager - short film, Hugh O’Connor 1958 - co-sound editor with David Green
- The General Foreman - short film, Morten Parker 1958 - sound editor
- The Skilled Worker - short film, Morten Parker 1958 - music, co-sound editor with David Green
- New Nation in the West Indies - Background to Federation - documentary short, Ian MacNeill 1958 - sound editor
- New Nation in the West Indies - The Riches of the Indies - documentary short, Ian MacNeill 1958 - sound editor
- Fire Detectives - documentary short, Donald Brittain 1958 - music
- Here and There - The St. Lawrence Seaway: Lifeline - documentary short, John Howe 1958 - music
- Here and There - The St. Lawrence Seaway: Power - documentary short, John Howe 1958 - music
- Here and There - The St. Lawrence Seaway: Bottleneck - documentary short, John Howe 1958 - music
- Le maître du Pérou - documentary, Fernand Dansereau 1958 - co-sound editor with Bernard Bordeleau
- Weakness into Strength - documentary short, Ian MacNeill 1958 - sound editor
- L'immigré - short film, Bernard Devlin 1959 - sound editor with Bernard Bordeleau
- The Golden Age - documentary short, Richard Gilbert 1959 - music
- The St. Lawrence Seaway - documentary short, John Howe and Isobel Kehoe 1959 - with Maurice Blackburn, music
- In the Beginning a Wilderness of Air - documentary short, Richard Gilbert 1959 - music
- The Maritimes: Traditions and Transitions - documentary short, Morten Parker 1959 - sound editor
- Double Heritage - documentary short, Richard Gilbert 1959 - music
- John Lyman, peintre - documentary short, Fernand Dansereau 1959 - sound editor with Marguerite Payette
- The Good, Bright Days (1919-1927) - documentary short, William Weintraub 1960 - with Eldon Rathburn and Joan Edward, music
- Sunshine and Eclipse (1927-1934) - documentary short, William Weintraub 1960 - with Eldon Rathburn and Joan Edward, music
- Twilight of an Era (1934-1939) - documentary short, William Weintraub 1960 - with Eldon Rathburn and Joan Edward, music
- Leadership Discipline - You Have Control - training film, Donald Wilder 1960 - music
- Search and Rescue: The Rescue Coordination Centre - documentary short, Roger Blais 1960 - music
- Search and Rescue: The Searchmaster - documentary short, Roger Blais 1960 - music
- Suburban Living: Six Solutions - documentary, Richard Gilbert 1960 - co-sound editor with Pierre Lemelin
- Le sport et les hommes - documentary, Hubert Aquin 1961 - sound editor
- Joey - short film, Graham Parker 1964 - co-sound editor with Victor Merrill
- The Prison Community - documentary short, Ernest Reid 1965 - music
- Buster Keaton Rides Again - documentary, John Spotton 1965 - music
- Notes for a Film About Donna & Gail - short film, Don Owen 1966 - music editor
- The Animal Movie - cartoon, Grant Munro and Ron Tunis 1966 - music and sound
- Helicopter Canada - documentary, Eugene Boyko 1966 - music
- Take It from the Top - documentary short, Eugene Boyko 1966 - music
- At the Autumn River Camp - documentary, Quentin Brown 1967 - co-sound editor with Ken Page and Don Wellington
- At the Caribou Crossing Place - documentary, Quentin Brown 1967 - co-sound editor with Ken Page and Don Wellington
- At the Spring Sea Ice Camp - documentary, Quentin Brown 1967 - co-sound editor with Ken Page and Don Wellington
- At the Winter Sea Ice Camp - documentary, Quentin Brown 1967 - co-sound editor with Ken Page and Don Wellington
- Fishing at the Stone Weir - documentary, Quentin Brown 1967 - co-sound editor with Ken Page and Don Wellington
- Stalking Seal on the Spring Ice - documentary, Quentin Brown 1967 - co-sound editor with Ken Page and Don Wellington
- Jigging for Lake Trout - documentary short, Quentin Brown 1967 - co-sound editor with Ken Page and Don Wellington
- Group Hunting on the Spring Ice - documentary, Quentin Brown 1967 - co-sound editor with Ken Page and Don Wellington
- Building a Kayak - documentary, Quentin Brown 1967 - co-sound editor with Ken Page and Don Wellington
- The Ernie Game - feature, Don Owen 1967 - music editor
- Angel - experimental short, Derek May 1967 - sound editor
- Adventures - short film, Michael Rubbo 1968 - co-sound editor with Victor Merrill
- The Winds of Fogo - documentary short, Colin Low 1969 - sound editor
- Falling from Ladders - documentary short, Mort Ransen 1969 - sound editor
- Where There's Smoke - compilation, Robert Verrall 1970 - co-editor with Karl Duplessis and Alex Raymont
- The Eskimo: Fight for Life - documentary, Robert M. Young 1970 - co-sound editor with Ken Page and Don Wellington
- Girls of Mountain Street - documentary short, Susan Huycke 1970 - sound editor
- Here's to Harry's Grandfather - documentary, Michael Rubbo 1970 - sound editor
- Pillar of Wisdom - documentary short, Josef Reeve 1970 - co-sound editor with Roger Lamoureux, Bill Graziadei and Roger Hart
- Of Many People - documentary short, Stanley Jackson 1970 - co-editor with John Spotton and Colin Low
- Ashes of Doom - short film, Grant Munro and Don Arioli 1970 - co-sound editor with Victor Merrill
- People of the Seal: Eskimo Summer - documentary, Richard Robinson and Michael McKennirey 1971 - co-sound editor with Ken Page, André Galbrand and Don Wellington
- People of the Seal: Eskimo Winter - documentary, Richard Robinson and Michael McKennirey 1971 - co-sound editor with Ken Page, André Galbrand and Don Wellington
- Nell and Fred - documentary short, Richard Todd 1971 - editor
- Norman Jewison, Film maker - documentary, Douglas Jackson 1971 - co-editor with Edward Le Lorrain and Les Halman
- Summer's Nearly Over - documentary short, Michael Rubbo 1971 - co-sound editor with Bill Graziadei
- Here is Canada - documentary short, Tony Ianzelo 1972 - editor
- The Question of Television Violence - documentary, Graeme Ferguson 1972 - editor
- Sub-Igloo - documentary short, James de Beaujeu Domville and Joseph B. MacInnis 1973 - editor
- Bate's Car: Sweet as a Nut - documentary short, Tony Ianzelo 1974 - editor
- Musicanada - documentary, 1975 - editor, co-director with Tony Ianzelo
- Alberta Girls - documentary short, 1975 - editor, co-director with Tony Ianzelo
- The Great Clean-up - documentary, James Carney 1976 - music with Karl Duplessis
- The Wings of Time - documentary short, Tom Radford 1976 - sound editor
- Coaches - documentary, Paul Cowan 1976 - sound editor
- You’re Eating for Two - documentary short, 1977 - editor, director
- The Forests and Vladimir Krajina - documentary short, Tom Radford 1978 - co-sound editor with Ian Rankin and Anne Wheeler
- The War is Over - short film, René Bonnière 1978 - producer
- It Wasn’t Easy - documentary short, Nico Crama 1978 - co-editor with Steven Kellar
- Canada Vignettes: The Music Makers - documentary short, 1979 - editor, director
- A Pinto for the Prince - documentary short, Colin Low and John Spotton 1979 - sound editor
- Fixed in Time: A Victoria Album - documentary short, Shelagh Mackenzie 1980 - co-sound editor with Les Halman and Arthur McKay
- The Last Days of Living - documentary, 1980 - editor, director
- Reflections on Suffering - documentary short, 1982 - editor, director
- Time for Caring - documentary short, 1982 - editor, director
- Singing: A Joy in Any Language - documentary, 1983 - editor, co-director with Tony Ianzelo
- Musical Magic: Gilbert and Sullivan in Stratford - documentary, 1984 - editor, director
- The Road to Patriation - documentary, Robert Duncan 1984 - co-editor with Fred Hillier, co-producer with Robert Duncan, Jennifer Torrance and Tom Daly
- One Step Away - documentary short, Robert Fortier 1985 - casting director
- Automated Lovers - documentary short, Annie O'Donoghue 1986 - sound editor
- Making the Words Sing - documentary short, 1990 - co-editor with Rex Tasker, co-producer with Terry Fulmer, director

== Awards ==
Musicanada (1975)

- Golden Gate International Film Festival, San Francisco: Honorable Mention, Special Jury Award, 1976

The Last Days of Living (1980)

- Chicago International Film Festival, Chicago: Gold Plaque, Social Issues, 1980
- Golden Gate International Film Festival, San Francisco: Honorable Mention, Honorable Mention, 1980
- HEMA (Health Education Media Association) Film Festival, Philadelphia: Best of Show, 1981
- Columbus International Film & Animation Festival, Columbus, Ohio: Chris Award, Bronze Plaque, 1981
- Medikinale, Marburg: Gold Medal, Specialized Information Films, 1982
- Medikinale, Marburg: Gold Medal, Grand Prize of the University of Marburg, 1982

Time for Caring (1982)

- International Rehabilitation Film Festival, New York: Certificate of Merit, 1983
