= 4th Canadian Film Awards =

1952 awards ceremony

- Date: April 27, 1952
- Location: Victoria Theatre, Toronto, Ontario
- Hosted by: Sidney Earle Smith

The 4th Canadian Film Awards were presented on April 27, 1952, to honour achievements in Canadian film.

This year's submissions were 20 documentaries and 50 films, including five full-length features, three of them French-language. Several changes were made; categories were expanded, the jury screenings were moved to Montreal, and more French-speaking judges were included. Also, the awards ceremony was moved from Ottawa to Toronto; this year's host was University of Toronto president Sidney Earle Smith.

== Winners ==
=== Films ===
- Film of the Year: Newfoundland Scene: A Tale of Outport Adventure — Crawley Films, F. R. Crawley producer and director
- Theatrical Feature Length (Documentary): Royal Journey — National Film Board of Canada, Tom Daly producer, David Bairstow, Gudrun Parker, Roger Blais directors

Honourable Mention: La petite Aurore, l'enfant martyre (Little Aurore's Tragedy) — L'Alliance Cinematographique Canadienne, Jean-Yves Bigras director

- Theatrical Short: Opera School — National Film Board of Canada, Guy Glover producer, Gudrun Parker director

Honourable Mention: The Fruitful Earth — Associated Screen Studios, Bernard Norrish producer, Gordon Sparling director
Honourable Mention: The Man in the Peace Tower — National Film Board of Canada, Sydney Newman producer, Roger Blais director
Honourable Mention: Struggle for Oil — National Film Board of Canada, Sydney Newman producer, Ronald Dick director

- Non-Theatrical, Open: Newfoundland Scene: A Tale of Outport Adventure — Crawley Films, F. R. Crawley producer and director

Honourable Mention: The Longhouse People — National Film Board of Canada, Tom Daly producer, Allan Wargon director
Honourable Mention: Les moines de Saint-Benoît (Monastery) — National Film Board of Canada, Guy Glover producer, Roger Blais director

- Non-Theatrical, Government Sponsored: Milk-Made — National Film Board of Canada, Michael Spencer producer, Larry Gosnell director

Honourable Mention: Ski à Québec — Service de ciné-photographie de la province de Québec, Abbé Maurice Proulx producer and director

- Non-Theatrical, Non-Government Sponsored: Packaged Power — Crawley Films, Quentin Brown producer
- Amateur: A Camper and His Canoe — David Palter producer and director

Honourable Mention: Cours primaire de français — French Ciné Club, University of Toronto
Honourable Mention: Story of a Georgian Coffee Pot — Victoria, B.C. Movie Club, Douglas Flintoff director

- Special Award: Around Is Around and Now is the Time - National Film Board of Canada, Norman McLaren and Evelyn Lambart producers, Norman McLaren director, "in recognition of research in a new area of filmmaking".
