= 19th Canadian Film Awards =

Canadian film awards ceremony

- Date: September 23, 1967
- Location: Inn on the Park, Toronto, Ontario
- Hosted by: Fred Davis

Highlights
- Most awards: Warrendale; Helicopter Canada
- Film of the Year: Warrendale
- Best Feature Film: Warrendale

The 19th Canadian Film Awards were held on September 23, 1967 to honour achievements in Canadian film. The ceremony was hosted by broadcaster Fred Davis.

In addition to being the year of Canada's 100th birthday celebrations, 1967 was the year that the Canadian Film Development Corporation was created. The corporation, later named Telefilm Canada, became the administrative body of a new $10 million fund established to assist Canadian feature film production.

This year also saw the beginning of a thorough reorganization of the CFAs. Recognizing that the current structure was not fulfilling the needs of the industry, the CFA joined with other organizations to form the Council of Canadian Film Organizations; its mandate was to explore the feasibility of establishing a Canadian Film Academy. In the interim, the 19th awards competition, which received 78 entries, was modified, with some categories dropped and others consolidated.

== Films ==
- Film of the Year: Warrendale — Canadian Broadcasting Corporation, Allan King producer and director
- Feature Film: Warrendale — Canadian Broadcasting Corporation, Allan King producer and director
- Arts and Experimental: Angel — National Film Board of Canada, Guy Glover producer, Derek May director
- Television Film: Land of the Loon — Dan Gibson Productions, Dan Gibson producer and director, tied with

Wojeck: The Last Man in the World — Canadian Broadcasting Corporation, David Peddie producer, Ron Kelly director

- Films for Children: Dimensions — National Film Board of Canada, Jacques Bobet producer, Bernard Longpré director
- Travel and Recreation: Adventure: Trent Severn Style — Dan Gibson Productions, Dan Gibson producer and director, tied with

The Entertainers — Crawley Films, F. R. Crawley producer, Seaton Findlay director

- General Information: Helicopter Canada — National Film Board of Canada, Peter Jones and Tom Daly producers, Eugene Boyko director, tied with

Notes for a Film About Donna & Gail — National Film Board of Canada, Julian Biggs producer, Don Owen director

- Public Relations: Global Village — Crawley Films, F. R. Crawley producer and director tied with

Movin' — Peterson Productions, Judy Birkett producer, Gordon Lightfoot director

- Sales Promotion: The Perpetual Harvest — Crawley Films, F. R. Crawley and Peter Cock producers, Peter Cock director
- Amateur: Not awarded

== Non-Feature Craft Awards ==
- Black-and-White Cinematography: Grahame Woods — Wojeck: The Last Man in the World (CBC)
- Colour Cinematography: Gilles Gascon — Élément 3 (Element 3) (NFB)
- Direction: Ron Kelly — Wojeck: The Last Man in the World (CBC) tied with

Allan King — Warrendale (CBC)

- Film Editing: Jacques Kasma — Trois hommes au mille carré (Ghosts of a River) (NFB)

== Special Award ==
- Helicopter Canada — National Film Board of Canada, Peter Jones and Tom Daly producers, Eugene Boyko director — "for providing a superbly appropriate and inspiring opportunity for Canadians to view their country in the Centennial Year".
