= Juggernaut (1968 film) =

- Directed by: Eugene Boyko
- Written by: Donald Brittain
- Produced by: Walford Hewitson
- Narrated by: Donald Brittain
- Cinematography: Eugene Boyko; Pyare Shivpuri
- Edited by: Albert Kish
- Production company: National Film Board of Canada
- Release date: 1968
- Running time: 27 minutes
- Country: Canada
- Language: English

Juggernaut is a Canadian short documentary film, directed by Eugene Boyko and released in 1968. Produced for the National Film Board of Canada, the film documents the delivery and transport of a calandria to a new nuclear reactor being built in Rajasthan, India.

== Awards ==
The film won the Canadian Film Award for Best Documentary Under 30 Minutes at the 21st Canadian Film Awards in 1969.
