= Candid Eye =

- Genre: Documentary
- Written by: Strowan Robertson; Stanley Jackson
- Directed by: Terence Macartney-Filgate; Stanley Jackson; Wolf Koenig; Roman Kroitor; William Greaves; Gilles Gascon (asst.)
- Narrated by: Stanley Jackson
- Composers: Eldon Rathburn; Pete Seeger; Sonny Terry
- Original language: English
- No. of seasons: 1
- No. of episodes: 8 (to 14)

Production
- Executive producer: Tom Daly
- Producers: Roman Kroitor; Wolf Koenig; John Spotton
- Cinematography: Michel Brault; Georges Dufaux; Reginald H. Morris; Terence Macartney-Filgate; Jean Roy; Wolf Koenig
- Editors: John Spotton; James Beveridge; William Greaves; Bruce Parsons; Édouard Davidovici; Roman Kroitor; Wolf Koenig; René Laporte; Tom Daly; Lucien Marleau; Kathleen Shannon (sound); Stuart Baker (sound); George Croll (sound); Frank Orban (sound); Michael McKennirey (sound); Don Wellington (sound)
- Running time: 24–30 minutes
- Production company: National Film Board of Canada

Original release
- Network: CBC Television
- Release: 26 October – 7 December 1958

Related
- Documentary '60; Frontiers The World in Action

Candid Eye is a Canadian documentary television series that aired on CBC Television in 1958 and was expanded into 1961.

== Production ==
Wolf Koenig, Terence Macartney-Filgate, and Stanley Jackson filmed The Days Before Christmas in December 1957, and the Canadian Broadcasting Corporation and National Film Board requested six more episodes after seeing it. The Days Before Christmas was later released in December 1958, while Blood and Fire aired as the first episode on 26 October 1958.

Tom Daly served as the executive producer. Multiple names were suggested for the show, including The Roving Eye, but Candid Eye was selected, despite fears that it would be confused with Candid Camera.

Candid Eye, influenced by British Free Cinema films and the work of Henri Cartier-Bresson, was one of the NFB's very first experiments in Cinéma vérité. The films were observational, shot on location using the NFB's new mobile, light-weight equipment. Only Festival in Puerto Rico had a script, and Pilgrimage, The Days Before Christmas, Police, and Blood and Fire involved large crowds. The Back-Breaking Leaf and Country Threshing were shot in fields; The Cars in Your Life, using slow-motion and pop-on-pop-off photography, was shot, in part, on a highway. The series has been credited as helping to inspire the Cinéma vérité documentary movement.

The show was successful--Blood and Fire won a Canadian film award and an American television award. (Later, The Back-Breaking Leaf would win the Eurovision Grand Prix at the Cannes Film Festival.) Six additional episodes were requested, although they would air under the name Documentary '60 after the CBC asked the NFB to rebrand Candid Eye, Frontiers, and The World in Action into one show. The Candid Eye is now classified as one 14-film series.

== Episodes ==
No.	Title	Directed by	Written by	Original release date
1	"Blood and Fire"	Terence Macartney-Filgate	N/A	26 October 1958
The activities of The Salvation Army. Awards: 2
2	"A Foreign Language"	Stanley Jackson	N/A	2 November 1958
The teaching of English to immigrant children in a Montreal school.
3	"Country Threshing"	Wolf Koenig	N/A	9 November 1958
The activities of a farm in the Eastern Townships of Quebec
4	"Pilgrimage"	Terence Macartney-Filgate	N/A	16 November 1958
Invalid and disabled pilgrims flock to Saint Joseph's Oratory.
5	"Memory of Summer"	Stanley Jackson	N/A	23 November 1958
Depictions of the magic of childhood include playing and singing.
6	"Police"	Terence Macartney-Filgate	N/A	30 November 1958
The daily routine of Toronto Police Service officers.
7	"The Days Before Christmas"	Wolf Koenig; Terence Macartney-Filgate; Stanley Jackson	N/A	7 December 1958
The sights and sounds of preparations for Christmas in Montreal.
8	"Glenn Gould - Off the Record"	Wolf Koenig; Roman Kroitor	Stanley Jackson (commentary)	1959
The concert pianist relaxes, and discusses composition, at his lakeside cottage.
9	"Glenn Gould - On the Record"	Wolf Koenig; Roman Kroitor	Stanley Jackson (commentary)	1959
Gould is in New York, where he is filmed recording Bach's Italian Concerto.
10	"Emergency Ward"	William Greaves	Stanley Jackson (commentary)	1959
A day in the life of the emergency ward at Montreal General Hospital.
11	"The Back-Breaking Leaf"	Terence Macartney-Filgate	Stanley Jackson (commentary)	1959
A sympathetic depiction of the manual tobacco harvest in southwestern Ontario. Awards: 3, including the Eurovision Grand Prix at the 1960 Cannes Film Festival.
12	"End of the Line"	Terence Macartney-Filgate	N/A	1959
A nostalgic look at the steam locomotive, with music by Pete Seeger and Sonny Terry.
13	"The Cars in Your Life"	Terence Macartney-Filgate	Stanley Jackson (commentary)	1960
A humorous look at 'motormania'. Awards: 1
14	"Festival in Puerto Rico"	Wolf Koenig; Roman Kroitor	Strowan Robertson	1961
Canadian contralto Maureen Forrester performs at the Casals Festival.

== Works cited ==
- Evans, Gary (1991). In the National Interest: A Chronicle of the National Film Board of Canada from 1949 to 1989. University of Toronto Press. ISBN 0802027849.
