= Angel (1966 film) =

1966 film

- Directed by: Derek May
- Written by: Derek May
- Produced by: Guy Glover
- Cinematography: Martin Duckworth
- Edited by: Ron Alexander (sound)
- Music by: Leonard Cohen; The Stormy Clovers
- Production company: National Film Board of Canada
- Release date: 1966
- Running time: 7 minutes
- Country: Canada
- Language: English
- Budget: $7,467

Angel is a 1966 experimental animated short directed by Derek May and produced by Guy Glover for the National Film Board of Canada.

In it, a young man, a girl and a dog play in the snow and attempt to fly.

The film was shot against a snowscape and then stripped of grayscale to create a pure white background. It features music by Leonard Cohen, performed by The Stormy Clovers.

== Awards ==
- 19th Canadian Film Awards, Toronto: First Prize, Arts and Experimental, 1967
- Vancouver International Film Festival, Vancouver: Honourable Mention, 1967
- Columbus International Film & Animation Festival, Columbus, Ohio: Chris Certificate, Graphic Arts, 1967
- Festival of Canadian Films - Montreal International Film Festival, Montreal: Special Mention, Short Films, 1967

== Works cited ==
- Evans, Gary (1991). In the National Interest: A Chronicle of the National Film Board of Canada from 1949 to 1989. University of Toronto Press. ISBN 0802027849.
