= Opera School =

- Directed by: Gudrun Parker
- Written by: Lister Sinclair
- Produced by: Guy Glover
- Starring: Marguerite Gignac
- Cinematography: Denis Gillson
- Music by: Louis Applebaum
- Production company: National Film Board of Canada
- Distributed by: National Film Board of Canada
- Release date: 1952
- Running time: 35 minutes
- Country: Canada
- Language: English

Opera School (La Classe d'opéra) is a 1952 dramatized short documentary film, directed by Gudrun Parker for the National Film Board of Canada.

The film traces the education of opera singer Marie Burton (Marguerite Gignac), who is studying at Toronto's The Royal Conservatory of Music. The climax is her debut singing the role of Susanna in The Marriage of Figaro.

Together with other films of the period that focus on music and theatre, including Music Professor by Gil LaRoche, and two other Parker films–A Musician in the Family and Children's Concert, it reflects Canadians' growing concern for Canadian art and culture.

The film won the Canadian Film Award for Best Theatrical Short Film at the 4th Canadian Film Awards in 1952 and third place in the Cultural category at the Yorkton Film Festival.
