= Family Circles =

1949 film by Morten Parker

- Directed by: Morten Parker
- Written by: Gudrun Parker; Morten Parker
- Produced by: Gudrun Parker; Tom Daly
- Narrated by: John Drainie
- Cinematography: Grant McLean
- Edited by: Horace Clarke
- Music by: Eldon Rathburn
- Distributed by: National Film Board of Canada
- Release date: 1949
- Running time: 31 minutes
- Country: Canada
- Languages: English; French

Family Circles (Les Parents) is a 1949 short documentary film directed by Morten Parker and produced by Gudrun Parker and Tom Daly for the National Film Board of Canada.

The film shows how the interplay of home and school influences the development of children. The experiences of three children illustrate vividly how parental indifference, lack of imagination, and emotional conflict at home can destroy the confidence and enthusiasm necessary for a child's success at school.

== Awards ==
- Cleveland Film Festival, Cleveland, Ohio: Best Film, Information: 1950
- 2nd Canadian Film Awards, Ottawa: First Prize, Non-theatrical, 1950
- Scholastic Teachers Magazine Annual Film Awards, New York: Top-Ten List of 16mm Information Films of 1949, 1950
- SODRE International Festival of Documentary and Experimental Films, Montevideo: Special Mention, Cultural Films, 1955
