= Off the Wall (1981 film) =

Off the Wall is a 1981 Canadian documentary film directed by Derek May and funded and produced by National Film Board of Canada. The film is an anthology of the Toronto art scene, circa 1980–1. Subjects in the film include art dealer and gallery owner Jack Pollack, artist Mendelson Joe and the art collective General Idea.

Produced by Tom Daly, Off the Wall received the prize for best cinematography at the Festival international du film sur l'art in Montreal.
