= 7th Canadian Film Awards =

Canadian film awards ceremony

- Date: 1955
- Location: No ceremony held
- Most awards: The Stratford Adventure

The 7th Canadian Film Awards were announced in 1955 to honour achievements in Canadian film.

The plan was to hold the gala in Ottawa, but the Association of Motion Pictures Producers and Laboratories and National Film Board of Canada commissioner Albert Trueman argued that the event should be a private, industry-only function. This went against one of the Canadian Film Association's main objectives–to show the public the value of the awards. In the end, the winners were announced via press release, award certificates were sent to the winners, and the Ottawa Film Society organized public screenings of the winning films.

== Winners ==
- Film of the Year: The Stratford Adventure — National Film Board of Canada, Guy Glover producer, Morten Parker director
- Theatrical Feature Length (Documentary): The Stratford Adventure — National Film Board of Canada, Guy Glover producer, Morten Parker director
- Theatrical Short: Not awarded

Honorable Mention: High Tide in Newfoundland — National Film Board of Canada, Nicholas Balla producer, Grant McLean director

- Non-Theatrical, Open: Riches of the Earth — National Film Board of Canada, Tom Daly producer, Colin Low director

Honorable Mention: One Little Indian — National Film Board of Canada, Tom Daly and Colin Low producers, Grant Munro director

- Non-Theatrical, Government Sponsored: Gift of the Glaciers — Film and Photographic Branch, Government of Alberta, K. Hutchinson producer and director

Honorable Mention: The Homeless Ones — National Film Board of Canada, Leslie McFarlane producer and director

- Non-Theatrical, Non-Government Sponsored: Where None Shall Thirst — United Church of Canada Committee on Missionary Education, Rev. Anson C. Moorehouse producer

Honorable Mention: It's in the Cards — Crawley Films, George Gorman producer and director

- Special Mentions:

Corral — National Film Board of Canada, Tom Daly producer, Colin Low director
Le Médécin du nord (Bush Doctor) — National Film Board of Canada, Roger Blais producer, Jean Palardy director
Castors du Québec (Québec Beavers) — Guernand Film Co., Fernand Guertin director
Look to the Centre — Crawley Films, Sally McDonald producer and director
Va-t-en jouer! — Service de ciné-photographie de la province de Québec, Lou Soucy producer, André Rousseau and Lou Soucy directors
Tools of Plenty — PGA Films
No Time to Spare — Chetwynd Films, Arthur Chetwynd producer
On the Broom — Briston Films
Each Year They Come — Francis J. S. Holmes Film Productions, Francis J. S. Holmes producer and director
The Grievance — National Film Board of Canada, Guy Glover producer, Morten Parker director
Movie Manners — University of Toronto Film Society
Nature in a City Lot — A. E. Phillips

- Amateur: Not awarded
- Special Award:

Hye Bossin, Editor Canadian Film Weekly — "in recognition of his valuable contribution over the years in the field of motion pictures in Canada, and particularly his promotion of Canadian film archives"
