= Los Canadienses =

- Directed by: Albert Kish
- Written by: Albert Kish; Laszlo Géfin
- Produced by: Tom Daly; Colin Low
- Narrated by: Donald Brittain
- Cinematography: Barry Perles
- Edited by: Albert Kish; Bill Graziadei (sound)
- Music by: Ben Low
- Production company: National Film Board of Canada
- Distributed by: National Film Board of Canada
- Release date: 1976
- Running time: 57 minutes, 31 seconds
- Country: Canada
- Languages: English, French

Los Canadienses is a 1976 documentary about the Canadian volunteers who fought in the Spanish Civil War. It was directed by Albert Kish and produced by Tom Daly and Colin Low for the National Film Board of Canada. It won several awards, including the 1977 BAFTA Award for Best Documentary.

== Synopsis ==
The Spanish Civil War (1936-1939) was a conflict between Spain's Nationalists, a right-wing alliance led by General Francisco Franco’s military junta, and Republicans, a left- and -centre wing group opposing the Nationalist overthrow of the constitutionally-elected government. Forty thousand volunteers from around the world traveled to Spain to fight in the war. Of all nationalities, only France saw more volunteers take part than Canada—1,200 Canadians joined the struggle as the XV International Brigade of the Mackenzie–Papineau Battalion; over half were killed.

As it is illegal for civilian Canadians to participate in foreign wars, survivors were not recognized by military institutions, or in official Canadian histories. Kish sought to give them their due through this film which, though emotional and respectful, does not lapse into sentimentality.

== Awards ==
- 30th British Academy Film Awards, London: BAFTA Award for Best Documentary, 1977
- Chicago International Film Festival, Chicago: Silver Hugo Award, 1977
- Yorkton Film Festival, Yorkton, Saskatchewan: Golden Sheaf Award, Best Documentary, 1977
- Melbourne Film Festival, Melbourne: TV Award for Best Film Made for TV, 1977
- American Film and Video Festival, New York: Blue Ribbon, International History and Culture, 1977
- International Filmfestival Mannheim-Heidelberg, Mannheim: Special Mention from the Fédération internationale de la presse cinématographique, 1976
- International Filmfestival Mannheim-Heidelberg, Mannheim: Special Prize for the Best Film, 1976
