= Helicopter Canada =

1966 film

- Film poster
- Directed by: Eugene Boyko
- Written by: Donald Brittain (dialogue); Derek May (dialogue)
- Produced by: Tom Daly; Peter Jones; Walford Hewitson (exec.)
- Narrated by: Stanley Jackson
- Cinematography: Eugene Boyko
- Edited by: Rex Tasker; Victor Merrill (sound)
- Music by: Malca Gillson
- Production company: National Film Board of Canada
- Distributed by: National Film Board
- Release date: 1966
- Running time: 50 minutes
- Country: Canada
- Language: English
- Budget: $300,000

Helicopter Canada (aka Hélicoptère Canada) is a 1966 Canadian documentary film produced by the National Film Board of Canada and directed by Eugene Boyko. The film features aerial photography of all ten of Canada's provinces. Helicopter Canada, sponsored by the Canada's Centennial Commission, was produced for international distribution in both French and English language versions for Canada's 100th anniversary.

== Synopsis ==
The short documentary offers a narrated tour from a helicopter of the Canadian provinces in 1966. The bird's-eye view showed both familiar and little-known aspects of the Canadian landscape. Among the featured film locations are: the Badlands, Alberta; Oak Island, Nova Scotia; Ottawa; Montréal; Québec City; Niagara Falls; Thousand Islands of the Saint Lawrence River; Toronto; Vancouver and Winnipeg.

== Cast ==
- The Beatles (cameo)
- Lester B. Pearson

== Production ==
Filmed in Panavision, Helicopter Canada took 18 months to produce and required cinematographer Eugene Boyko to spend 540 hours aloft in a specially outfitted Alouette II helicopter.

Helicopter Canada was made for international distribution during the Canadian Centennial. Columbia Pictures bought the rights for a 22-minute version that was distributed internationally, including the USSR, USA, China and Italy. Besides French, the film was translated into 12 languages.

== Reception ==
Although now considered dated, Helicopter Canada, during its initial release, received positive reviews. Joan Fox wrote in The Globe and Mail, "If this film doesn’t stir your Canadian blood, nothing will."

== Awards ==
- 19th Canadian Film Awards, Toronto: Best Film, General Information, 1967
- 19th Canadian Film Awards, Toronto: Special Prize: “For providing a superbly appropriate and inspiring opportunity for Canadians to view their country in the Centennial Year”, 1967
- Canadian Travel Film Awards, Toronto: First Prize, 1967
- International Travel Documentary Film Festival, New Delhi: Special Prize, 1967
- Adelaide International Film Festival, Adelaide: Diploma, 1969
- 39th Academy Awards, Los Angeles: Nominee: Best Documentary Feature, 1967
