= Albert Kish =

Hungarian-Canadian documentarian/filmmaker (1937–2015)

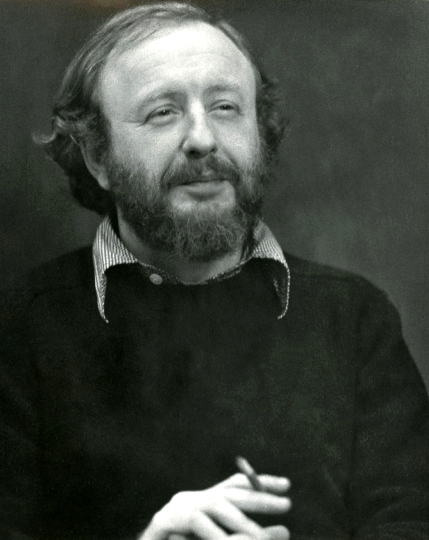
- Kish, 2007
- Born: May 14, 1937; Eger, Hungary
- Died: October 23, 2015 (aged 78); Toronto, Canada
- Citizenship: Canadian
- Occupation: Documentarian/filmmaker
- Awards: see below

Albert Kish (14 May 1937 – 23 October 2015) was a Canadian documentarian/filmmaker.

== Life and career ==
Kish was born in Albert Kiss in Eger, Hungary, the son of Olga Weisz, a clothing store manager, and Albert Kiss, a customs officer. He became interested in film at an early age and was attending the Academy of Drama and Film in Budapest when the Hungarian Revolution of 1956 forced his family to leave Hungary. They moved to Montreal in 1956 and changed their name to 'Kish'.

Kish found work as a photographer and, in 1964, was hired as an editor at the CBC. In 1967, he was hired by the Canadian National Railway to photograph trains for Expo 67. National Film Board of Canada director John Howe liked his work and offered him a job. Kish stayed with the NFB until his retirement in 1997, directing, producing and/or editing 33 films.

Outside of the NFB, Kish made three films with Bashar Shbib. He also maintained a life-long interest in photography, and his photographs have appeared in several publications and exhibitions.

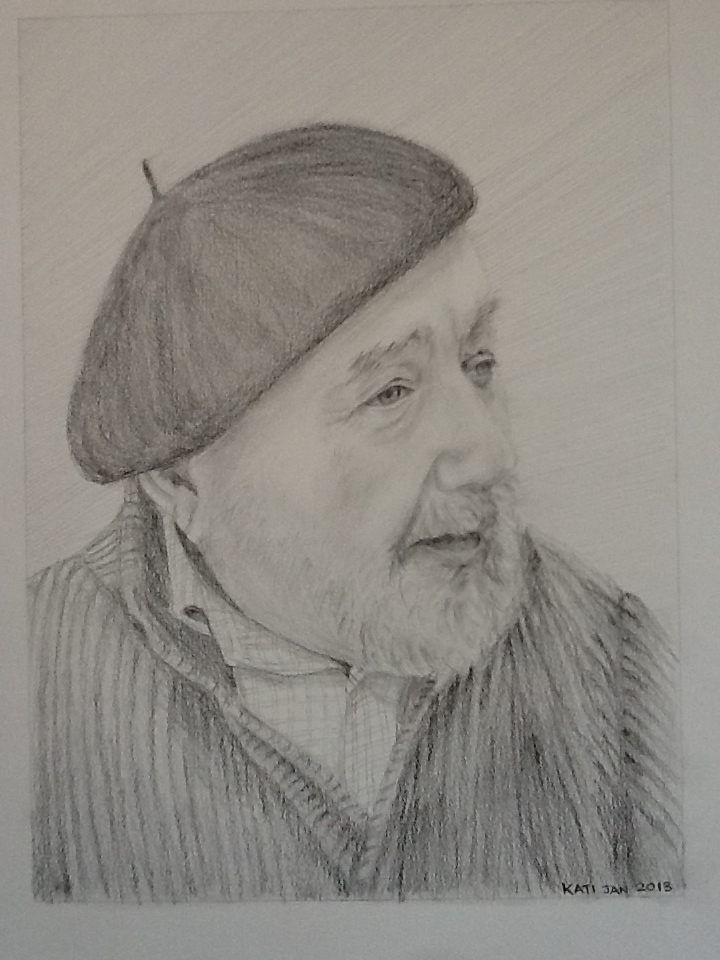
Albert Kish, 2013

== Personal life and death ==
In 1994, Kish married engineer Katalin Futo. He died of cancer at Toronto General Hospital on October 23, 2015, and was survived by his wife and two sons.

== Filmography ==
(All for the National Film Board of Canada)

- Flight in White - documentary short, William Canning 1968 - editor
- Juggernaut - documentary short, Eugene Boyko 1968 - editor
- Ports Canada - documentary short 1969 - director, editor
- Freeze-in - documentary short, F. Whitman Trecartin 1970 - producer, editor
- Bighorn - documentary short, Bill Schmalz 1970 - editor
- Occupation - documentary, Bill Reid 1970 - editor
- Search into White Space - documentary short, James Carney 1970 - editor
- Family House - documentary short, Laurence Hyde 1970 - photographer
- City Limits - documentary short, Laurence Hyde 1971 - photographer
- This is a Photograph - documentary short 1971 - director, editor, photographer
- Time Piece - documentary short 1971 - director, editor, writer
- Bannerfilm - documentary short, Donald Winkler 1972 - editor
- Louisbourg - documentary short 1972 - director, editor
- Our Street was Paved with Gold - documentary short 1973 - director, editor
- In Praise of Hands - documentary short, Donald Winkler 1974 - editor
- Los Canadienses - documentary 1975 - director, writer, editor
- Bekevar Jubilee - documentary short 1977 - director, writer, editor
- Hold the Ketchup - documentary short 1977 - director, editor
- Paper Wheat - documentary 1979 - director, editor
- The Image Makers - documentary 1980 - director, writer, editor
- Conspiracy of Silence - documentary short, Nelu Ghiran 1981 - editor
- F.R. Scott: Rhyme and Reason - documentary, Donald Winkler 1982 - editor
- Muscle - documentary short, Barry Lank 1983 - editor
- The Age of Invention - short film 1984 - director, producer, editor
- The Scholar in Society: Northrop Frye in Conversation - documentary short, Donald Winkler 1984 - editor
- Age of the Rivers - documentary 1986 - director, writer, editor
- Al Purdy: A Sensitive Man - documentary, Donald Winkler 1988 - editor
- Notman's World - documentary short 1989 - director, editor
- To the Queen Mother from Canada with Love - documentary short 1990 - director, editor
- Litrosi - documentary, Maria K. Daskalos 1993 - editor
- The Summer of '67 - documentary 1994 - producer, editor and (with Donald Winkler) director
- Louisbourg Under Siege - documentary 1997 - director, editor

With Chbib Productions

- Bread - short film 1985 - director, editor
- Clair Obscur - feature, Bashar Shbib 1988 - editor
- Full of Grace - short film, Shernold Edwards 2006 - editor

== Awards ==
Ports Canada (1969)

- Gold Camera Award, U.S. Industrial Film Festival, Chicago 1970

This is a Photograph (1971)

- Genie Award for Best Theatrical Short Film, 24th Canadian Film Awards, Toronto 1972
- Canadian Film Award - Best Sound Re-recording, 24th Canadian Film Awards, Toronto 1972
- Silver Medal, Venice Film Festival, Venice 1973

Los Canadienses (1975)

- BAFTA Award for Best Documentary (Robert Flaherty Award), British Academy of Film & Television Arts, London 1976
- Silver Hugo Award, Chicago International Film Festival 1976
- Special Award for Best Television Film, and Special Mention by the International Federation of Film Critics, International Week of Cinema, Mannheim, Germany 1976
- Best Documentary Film, Yorkton Film Festival, Yorkton, Saskatchewan 1976
- Blue Ribbon Award, International History & Culture, American Film Festival, New York 1977
- TV Award, Best film made specifically for TV, Melbourne Film Festival, Australia 1977

Paper Wheat (1979)

- Chris Award, Business and Industry, Columbus International Film & Animation Festival, Columbus, Ohio 1979
- Certificate for Outstanding Film, Hong Kong International Film Festival, Hong Kong 1980

The Age of Invention (1984)

- Blue Ribbon Award, Visual Essays, American Film Festival, New York 1985

Bread (1985)

- Blue Ribbon Award, Social Studies, American Film Festival, New York 1984
- Special Mention, San Francisco International Film Festival 1984
- Second Prize, Documentary, Alicante Film Festival, Alicante, Spain 1985

Notman's World (1989)

- Gold Apple Award, 2lst Annual Educational Film and Video Festival, Oakland, California 1991
- Honourable Mention, Art & Culture, Columbus International Film & Animation Festival, Columbus, Ohio 1991
