= The Stratford Adventure =

1954 film

- Directed by: Morten Parker
- Written by: Gudrun Parker
- Produced by: Guy Glover
- Starring: Alec Guinness
- Narrated by: John Drainie
- Cinematography: Donald Wilder
- Edited by: Douglas Tunstell; Kenneth Heeley-Ray (sound)
- Music by: Louis Applebaum
- Production company: National Film Board of Canada
- Release date: August 2, 1954
- Running time: 39:17 minutes
- Country: Canada
- Language: English

The Stratford Adventure is a 1954 Oscar-nominated documentary film about the founding of the Stratford Festival. It is directed by Morten Parker for the National Film Board of Canada.

It tells the story of how the small Canadian city of Stratford, on the banks of the Avon River, realized the vision of local journalist Tom Patterson: the creation of a theatre for the staging of the finest Shakespearean drama. Patterson gathered a committee of local people and invited Tyrone Guthrie to advise on the festival and direct the plays. A fund was set up, an Elizabethan stage built, and Alec Guinness and Irene Worth were signed to perform alongside Canadian actors in Richard III and All's Well That Ends Well.

The film shows Alec Guinness giving Timothy Findley lessons in breath control, Tyrone Guthrie directing rehearsals, and the creation of elaborate sets and costumes. It also shows the crucial meeting which took place when the project was facing bankruptcy, then visitors flocking to Stratford, and scenes from the triumphant reality of the plays.

== Cast ==
- Michael Bates as himself
- Timothy Findley as himself
- Alec Guinness as himself
- Tyrone Guthrie as himself
- Irene Worth as herself

== Awards ==
- Edinburgh International Film Festival, Edinburgh, Scotland: Diploma of Merit, 1954
- 7th Canadian Film Awards, Toronto: Genie Award for Film of the Year, 1955
- 7th Canadian Film Awards, Toronto: Genie Award for Best Theatrical Documentary, 1955
- Kootenay Film Festival, Nelson, British Columbia: First Prize, Artistic Achievement, 1956
- Columbus International Film & Animation Festival, Columbus, Ohio: Award of Merit, Literature in Films, 1956
- Johannesburg International Film Festival, Johannesburg: Certificate of Merit, 1956
- 27th Academy Awards, Los Angeles: Nominee: Best Documentary Feature, 1955

== See also ==
- William Shakespeare
