= Hye Bossin =

Canadian writer (1906–1964)

Hyman (Hye) Bossin (1906–1964) was a Canadian journalist, editor and author, most noted as editor of the Canadian film magazine Canadian Film Weekly from 1941 until his death in 1964.

The son of Jewish immigrants, Bossin was born and raised in Toronto. After having had a number of short stories and non-fiction articles published in Canadian media in early adulthood, he briefly moved to Hollywood with the goal of becoming a screenwriter, but soon returned to Toronto and began writing a weekly column and film reviews for the Toronto Star. In 1939 he published A Saint in Street Clothes, a biography of Toronto newspaper salesman Willie Frankel, who was an early labour organizer for newspaper sales workers and a leader in the city's Jewish community in the early 20th century.

In 1941, Bossin and Nat Taylor took over the struggling Canadian film trade publication The Exhibitor, renaming it to Canadian Film Weekly and successfully reviving it as an important outlet for Canadian film industry news. His weekly column in the magazine was titled "On the Square", named for the magazine's offices near Toronto's Yonge-Dundas Square (now Sankofa Square). One of his most famous columns for the magazine poked fun at the common practice of defining actors in terms of their similarities to or differences from other actors, attracting so much feedback that he revisited the theme of "X is the one who isn't Y" in several further columns until he tired of it.

He also authored two books of historical analysis of Abraham Lincoln's diplomatic relationships with Canada and the United Kingdom, In the Spirit of Abraham Lincoln in 1954 and Mr. Lincoln's Forgotten Friend in 1956, as well as Stars of David, a history of Jewish contributions to live theatre in Toronto.

He was a recipient of a special Canadian Film Award, for "his valuable contribution over the years in the field of motion pictures in Canada, and particularly his promotion of Canadian film archives", at the 7th Canadian Film Awards in 1955.
