= Warrendale (film) =

- Directed by: Allan King
- Produced by: Allan King
- Cinematography: William Brayne
- Edited by: Peter Moseley
- Production company: Allan King Associates
- Distributed by: Canadian Broadcasting Corporation
- Release date: 1967
- Running time: 100 minutes
- Country: Canada
- Language: English

Warrendale is a 1967 documentary film by Canadian filmmaker Allan King. It was originally produced for broadcast on CBC Television, but CBC refused to show it because King refused to edit out the film's copious profanity. The film was allowed to be shown only during festivals.

The film is a cinéma vérité look at the lives of emotionally disturbed children housed in a facility named Warrendale, in Rexdale, Ontario, at the time a Toronto suburb. The facility was considered innovative and met with approval when it first opened in December 1965. However, almost a year after it opened, it became the centre of several controversies in the Legislative Assembly of Ontario, and was eventually closed. Founder John Brown was a New Democratic Party member of the Legislature from 1967 to 1971.

Warrendale won awards at the 1967 Cannes Film Festival, and French director Jean Renoir declared King a great artist. The film won three Canadian Film Awards at the 19th Canadian Film Awards in 1967: Film of the Year, Best Feature Film and Best Direction. Grove Press released Warrendale in the United States in 1968.

In 2002, Warrendale was honoured by the Masterworks program of the Audio-Visual Preservation Trust of Canada.
