= Documentary '60 =

- Genre: documentary
- Country of origin: Canada
- Original language: English
- No. of seasons: 1
- No. of episodes: 26

Production
- Executive producer: Tom Daly
- Running time: 30 minutes
- Production company: National Film Board of Canada

Original release
- Network: CBC Television
- Release: 25 October 1959 – 29 May 1960

Related
- Candid Eye

Documentary '60 is a Canadian documentary television series that aired on CBC Television from 1959 to 1960.

== Premise ==
This series featured various National Film Board of Canada documentaries, similar in concept to 1958's Candid Eye except that this new series was given a full broadcast season. Some of the documentaries were previously broadcast on Candid Eye.

== Scheduling ==
This half-hour series was broadcast on Sundays at 5:30 p.m. (Eastern) from 25 October 1959 to 29 May 1960.

== Episodes ==
Films broadcast in the series included:

- The Back- Breaking Leaf (Wolf Koenig and Roman Kroitor producers; Terence Macartney-Filgate director), about tobacco farming in Ontario
- Between Two Wars (William Weintraub producer) is a group of three films on early 20th-century Canadian life and economic fortunes: The Good, Bright Days (1919–1927), Sunshine and Eclipse (1927–1934) and Twilight of an Era (1934–1939)
- Bright Land (Morten Parker director), featuring life in the West Indies
- The Cars in Your Life (Wolf Koenig and Roman Kroitor producers; Terence Macartney-Filgate director), concerning the role of the automobile in North America
- Emergency Ward (Wolf Koenig and Roman Kroitor producers; William Greaves director), filmed at the Montreal General Hospital
- End of the Line (Wolf Koenig and Roman Kroitor producers; Terence Macartney-Filgate director), documenting the replacement of steam locomotives with diesel in the rail industry
- Georges P. Vanier: Soldier, Diplomat, Governor General (Victor Jobin and Jean Roy producers; Clément Perron director)
- Glenn Gould: Off the Record, (Wolf Koenig and Roman Kroitor, producers and directors)
- Glenn Gould: On the Record, second part to Glenn Gould: Off the Record
- I Was A Ninety-Pound Weakling (Wolf Koenig and Roman Kroitor producers; Wolf Koenig and Georges Dufaux directors), featuring the physical fitness industry
- The Inquiring Mind (David Bairstow, producer and director), featuring academics and their various research topics
- Life and Radiation (Hugh O'Connor, producer and director), exploring various forms of radiation from sunlight to gamma rays
- The Little Sisters (Léonard Forest producer, Pierre Patry director), concerning life at Les Servantes de Jésus-Marie convent in Hull, Quebec
- Men Against The Ice (David Bairstow, producer and director), concerning exploration through the Northwest Passage
- On Prescription Only (David Bairstow producer; Julian Biggs director), regarding modern advances in medical drugs
- Pangnirtung (Tom Daly producer; John Feeney director), featuring life in the northern Canadian community
- The Performer (David Bairstow producer; Donald Ginsberg director), broadcast in two parts, this explored the state of culture and performing artists in Canada featuring David Adams, John Drainie, Celia Franca, Frances Hyland, Oscar Peterson, Christopher Plummer and Teresa Stratas
- Poisons, Pests, and People (David Bairstow producer; Larry Gosnell director), broadcast in two parts, concerned modern insect control, the effects of insecticides, and research towards species-specific pest control
- The Power of Matter (David Bairstow producer; Graham Parker director) another two-part documentary on nuclear energy
- Steering North (David Bairstow producer and director), featuring navigation in the Arctic
- This Electronic World (David Bairstow producer; Julian Biggs director), featuring the effects of electronic technology on modern life
