= Who Will Teach Your Child? =

- Directed by: Stanley Jackson
- Written by: Stanley Jackson
- Produced by: Gudrun Parker; Tom Daly
- Narrated by: Percy Rodriguez
- Cinematography: Grant McLean
- Edited by: Stanley Jackson; Gudrun Parker; George Brandt
- Music by: Eldon Rathburn
- Production company: National Film Board of Canada
- Release date: 1948
- Running time: 30 minutes
- Country: Canada
- Language: English

Who Will Teach Your Child? is a 1948 Canadian short documentary, directed by Stanley Jackson for the National Film Board of Canada.

The film is about the importance of elementary and high school teachers in the development of children, mixing commentary with dramatic enactments of various potential classroom incidents acted by real Ottawa-area students and teachers. It is an analysis of the teacher’s vital role in a child’s development and asks three important questions: how can the teaching profession attract people of superior ability, to the teaching profession; how should these people be trained, and how can they be persuaded to stay in the teaching profession, as opposed to moving on to more lucrative careers.

Who Will Teach Your Child? won the Canadian Film Award for Best Theatrical Short Film at the 1st Canadian Film Awards in 1949. The film was also named by Scholastic Teacher magazine as one of the ten best films about education distributed in the United States in 1949.
