= Newfoundland Scene =

- Directed by: F. R. Crawley
- Produced by: F. R. Crawley
- Narrated by: Frank Peddie; François Bertrand
- Cinematography: F. R. Crawley; Stanley Brede
- Music by: William McCauley
- Production company: Crawley Films
- Distributed by: National Film Board of Canada; Imperial Oil
- Release date: 1951
- Running time: 44 minutes
- Country: Canada
- Language: English

Newfoundland Scene: A Tale of Outport Adventure is a 1951 Canadian documentary film, directed by F. R. Crawley.

The film, which was sponsored by Imperial Oil, was shot in 1949 to mark the admission of Newfoundland to Canadian Confederation and depicted various scenes of life throughout Canada's newest province. It highlights Newfoundland's natural resources, with a focus on cod fishing, seal hunting, and whaling. Also looked at is transportation by dog sled; included is a scene where a team of Malemutes rebels against its leader, causing injury.

It won the Canadian Film Award for Film of the Year at the 1952 Canadian Film Awards. It was reissued in the 1970s, with rerecorded narration by Gordon Pinsent and some potentially controversial hunting scenes removed.
