= Gudrun Parker =

Canadian film director (1920–2022)

Gudrun Parker OC
- Born: Gudrun Johanna Bjerring; March 16, 1920; Winnipeg, Manitoba, Canada
- Died: November 15, 2022 (aged 102); Edmonton, Alberta, Canada
- Other name: Gudrun Bjerring
- Education: University of Winnipeg
- Occupations: Filmmaker, teacher
- Known for: Filmmaking, teaching
- Spouse: Morten Parker (m. 1944; died 2014)
- Children: 2

Gudrun Johanna Bjerring Parker OC (March 16, 1920 – November 15, 2022) was a Canadian filmmaker, writer, and producer. She worked on films with the National Film Board of Canada (NFB) during the Second World War and in the early 1950s. Parker wrote the script for The Stratford Adventure, which was nominated for an academy award, and directed part of Royal Journey, which won a BAFTA. She married fellow NFB filmmaker Morten Parker. They often worked as a team on films and in 1963, they established a production company, Parker Film Associates.

Although she left the NFB in 1956 to focus on raising her first child Julie, Parker remained active in the filmmaking industry. Her husband travelled to locations and filmed for their production company while she stayed at home producing, editing, and eventually working as a film studies teacher at Vanier College. She was appointed an Officer of the Order of Canada (OC) in 2005.

Parker was of Icelandic descent; her parents came from the north of Iceland and immigrated to Canada.

== Career ==
Parker attended the University of Winnipeg (then called United College). After graduating, she worked on the hotels and rails beat as a reporter for the Winnipeg Free Press. She met documentary filmmaker John Grierson, who was travelling across the country recruiting workers for the NFB. Grierson was impressed with her and interviewed her for a job with the NFB. Parker later said that she did not even know the film board existed when she was offered the job.

Parker travelled from Winnipeg to Ottawa to begin working with the NFB in March 1942. (Note: While fellow filmmakers Judith Crawley and Laura Boulton came to the NFB as freelancers, Gudrun Bjerring Parker was hired as a permanent employee.) In his memoir of the early days of the film board, scriptwriter Graham McInnes described Parker as "a very quiet, extremely persistent worker with an outwardly sweet and accommodating approach which masked a truly tremendous tenacity."

After six months working as an assistant in the cutting room, Parker asked to direct her own film. She secured the funding for the film herself, asking for sponsorship from the Department of National Health and Welfare. Cinematographer Judith Crawley filmed and Parker directed the production, which was called Vitamins A, B, C. The film educated viewers about maintaining nutrition with wartime shortages and featured a great deal of footage of children. She later worked with Graham McInnes on a film called A Friend for Supper. According to McInnes the slogan "a friend for supper," was Parker's idea, a way of encouraging Canadian children not to waste food by imagining they were having a 'friend' — a child refugee — over for a meal with them. McInnes was dubious because he thought this notion would encourage children to eat more instead of less but his "misgivings were without foundation," he later wrote. "She shot the film as planned. Despite the equivocal logic it was an instant and continuing success with children — and with adults."

This success was the beginning of Parker's long involvement with children and education through film. Her next film, Before They Are Six (1943) also dealt with children, as well as women's challenges during wartime. This film details the efforts of women to establish daycares for their children while they went to work at munitions factories.

=== Postwar films ===
In 1944, Parker became the head of the NFB Educational Unit, continuing her focus on children. In the mid-1950s, Parker worked with Marjorie McKay to write three series of short educational films. The first "What Do You Think" was made for teenagers, the second "What's Your Opinion," for adults, and the third "What's Making up Your Mind," focussed on "media influence and conformity." Her films Musician in the Family and Being Different are notable for exploring alternative gender roles for boys. In Being Different a young boy must deal with the derision of his classmates after he takes an interest in the local butterfly society. According to Canadian Studies scholar Judith Hammill, "the subtext has all kinds of implications about the social formation of masculinity."

Parker also highlighted the Canadian arts scene in her films. Her short documentary Listen to the Prairies (1946) is about an annual Manitoba music festival. Her award-winning Opera School (1951) profiles a young opera singer at the Royal Conservatory of Music.

Parker also wrote the script for The Stratford Adventure (1954), a documentary about the creation of the Stratford Festival. Parker was slated to direct that film but she was pregnant at the time so her husband, filmmaker Morten Parker stepped in. The Stratford Adventure was a critical success and earned the NFB an Oscar nomination for best documentary feature. It was also named Film of the Year at the Canadian Film Awards. Parker later called the film a "historical document" The Stratford Adventure features British director Tyrone Guthrie, and stage stars Irene Worth and Alec Guinness. It also features a brief appearance from a young Timothy Findley who was part of the original Stratford company and would go on to become a successful novelist and playwright.

== Personal life and death ==
Parker died on November 15, 2022, in Edmonton, Alberta, at the age of 102.

== Legacy ==
Canadian Studies scholar Judith Hammill says Parker's films, "reflect a historical moment in Canadian film. In their evolution from the relatively spare Griersonian cinema of social purpose to a cinema that, while always retaining its social purpose, grew to embrace aesthetic innovation, technical polish, and a significant degree of personal expression, we can trace the growth of Canadian documentary over the period." Hammill argues that after the war "Gudrun's seminal work in an observational style was an influence on a whole generation of filmmakers who made it a Canadian genre."

== Filmography ==
- Vitamins A, B, C and D (1943) Producer/Director/Writer/Editor
- Before they are Six (1943) Producer/Director/Writer/Editor
- The People's Bank (1944) Producer/Director/Writer/Editor
- A Friend For Supper (1944) Director/Writer
- Listen to the Prairies (1946) Producer/Director/Writer/Editor
- The Policeman (1946) Producer/Director/Writer/Editor
- New Chapters (1947) Producer/Director
- The Postman (1947) Producer
- The Home Town Paper (1948) Producer
- Maps We Live By (1948) Producer/Director/Writer/Editor
- Who Will Teach Your Child? (1948) Producer/Writer/Editor
- Children's Concert (1949) Producer/Director/Writer/Editor
- Family Circles (1949) Producer/Writer
- Opera School (1951) Director/Editor
- Royal Journey (1951) Director
- A Musician in the Family (1953) Director/Editor
- One Man's Opinion (1953) Director/Writer
- The Majority Vote (1953) Director/Writer
- The Honest Truth (1953) Director/Writer
- The Stratford Adventure (1954) Director/Writer
- Who's Running Things? (1955) Director/Writer
- Having Your Say (1955) Director/Writer
- Getting What You're After (1955) Director/Writer
- The Public's Business (1955) Director/Writer
- Community Responsibilities (1955) Director/Writer
- Leaving it to the Experts (1955) Producer/Director/Writer
- Seeing is Believing (1956) Producer/Director/Writer
- The Story Behind the News (1956) Director/Writer
- Getting on the Bandwagon (1956) Director/Writer
- Making a Decision in the Family (1957) Writer
- Being Different (1957) Writer
- Choosing a Leader (1957) Writer
- Popular Psychology (1957) Writer
- Four Teachers (1961) Writer

== Awards ==
- Officer of the Order of Canada. Awarded on November 17, 2005, and invested on October 6, 2006.

Other honours:

- Who Will Teach Your Child: Canadian Film Award (CFA) for theatrical short (1949).
- Family Circles: CFA for non-theatrical short (1950).
- Royal Journey: CFA for best feature film, and a BAFTA (1952).
- Opera School: CFA for theatrical short (1952).
- The Stratford Adventure: nominated for an Academy Award (1953).
- A City Sings: nominated for the Cannes Short Film of the Year (1946).
