= Morten Parker =

Canadian director and producer (1919–2012)

- Born: 28 July 1919; Winnipeg, Canada
- Died: 26 May 2014 (aged 94); New York City
- Occupations: Director, producer, writer, educator
- Years active: 1946–2012
- Spouse: Gudrun Parker

Morten Parker (July 29, 1919 – May 26, 2014) was a Canadian director, producer and writer.

== Biography ==
Parker was born and raised in a Jewish family in Winnipeg, Manitoba, attended the University of Winnipeg and began his career as a journalist. In 1942, his girlfriend, filmmaker Gudrun Bjerring, was hired by the National Film Board of Canada (NFB). The two moved to Ottawa and, in 1947, Parker was also hired by the NFB. They married in 1944 (after which Bjerring became known as the filmmaker Gudrun Parker). They made several films together, notably The Stratford Adventure (1954), which was nominated for an Oscar.

Parker directed, produced and/or wrote 35 films for the NFB. His interest lay in social and labour justice, and he was responsible for films in the NFB's Labour in Canada series (1953–54) and 1958's The Nature of Work series. He also directed The Fight: Science Against Cancer, which was nominated for an Oscar in 1951. Also in 1951, an independent film called Inondations, which he co-directed with Al Stark, was presented at the Cannes Film Festival.

In 1963, Parker left the NFB and, with Gudrun, formed Parker Film Associates, through which Parker made three films with his friend and NFB colleague, the producer and cinematographer John Spotton. The Parkers then moved to New York, where Morten became an adjunct associate professor of film studies at the New York University School of Professional Studies. He also taught film studies at The City University of New York, and served as the special advisor on communications to the prime minister of Jamaica, the UNESCO film advisor to the State of Israel, and the United Nations Expert in Film Production.

== Personal life and death ==
Morten and Gudrun Bjerring Parker were married for 70 years and had two daughters. He died of natural causes in New York City on May 26, 2014, at age 95.

== Filmography ==
National Film Board of Canada:

- The Postman – documentary short, 1947 – director
- Maps We Live By – documentary short, Gudrun Parker 1947 – co-writer with Gudrun Parker
- Maps We Live By (Revised) – documentary short, Gudrun Parker 1948 – co-writer with Gudrun Parker
- The Home Town Paper – documentary short, 1948 – director, writer, editor
- Family Circles – documentary short, 1949 – director, co-writer with Gudrun Parker
- Challenge: Science Against Cancer – documentary short, 1950 – director
- The Fight: Science Against Cancer – documentary short, 1950 – director
- The Outlaw Within – documentary short, 1951 – director, writer
- Inondations- short film (non-NFB) - co-director, 1951
- Dues and the Union – documentary short, David Bearstow 1953 – co-producer with Guy Glover
- The Shop Steward – documentary short, 1953 – director, writer
- The Stratford Adventure – documentary short, 1954 – director
- The Research Director – documentary short, Ron Weyman 1954 – producer
- The Grievance – documentary short, 1954 – writer, director
- Indochina – documentary short, 1955 – director, writer
- Parliamentary Procedure – documentary short, 1955 – director, writer
- Strike in Town – short film, 1955 – co-writer with Ian MacNeill
- The Structure of Unions – documentary short, 1955 – director
- Strike in Town (Revised) – short film, 1956 – co-writer with Ian MacNeill
- The Clerk – short film, Allan Wargon 1958 – producer
- The General Foreman – documentary short, 1958 – director, co-writer with John Wyllie, producer
- The Department Manager – short film, Hugh O'Connor 1958 – co-writer with Ian MacNeill, producer
- The Man on the Assembly Line – documentary short, 1958 – director, writer, producer
- The Skilled Worker – documentary short, 1958 – director, writer
- The Vice-President – short film, Hugh O'Connor 1958 – co-writer with Sidney Katz, producer
- The Bright Land – documentary short, 1959 – director, writer
- The Maritimes: Traditions and Transitions – documentary short, 1959 – director
- Angkor, the Lost City – documentary short, 1961 – co-director with Roger Blais
- Charles Tupper: The Big Man – documentary short, 1961 – director
- Blindness – short film, 1964 – director
- John Cabot: A Man of the Renaissance – documentary short, 1964 – director, writer
- The Red Kite – short film, 1965 – director, writer
- A Trumpet for the Combo – short film, 1965 – director
- Work of Art – documentary short, 1965 – director, writer
- Labour College – documentary short, 1966 – co-producer with John Howe
- The Meeting – documentary short, 1966 – director, writer, co-producer with John Howe
- The Shattered Silence – documentary short, 1966 – director, co-producer with John Howe
- The Case of Barbara Parsons – short film, co-production 1978 – director, writer

Parker Film Associates:

- Rivera – short film, 1964 – director, producer, writer, editor
- Sanchez – short film, 1965 – director, producer, writer, editor
- Ybarra – short film, 1966 – director, producer, writer, editor
- Quintet: Reflections on a Life – short film, 2010 – co-director, writer

== Awards ==
Family Circles (1949)

- 2nd Canadian Film Awards, Ottawa: Genie Award for Best Non-Theatrical Film, 1950
- Ohio State Radio and TV Awards, Cleveland: Best Film, Information, 1950
- SODRE International Festival of Documentary and Experimental Films, Montevideo, Uruguay: Special Mention, Cultural Films, 1955
- Scholastic Teacher Magazine Annual Film Awards: Top-Ten Best Information Films list, 1950

Challenge: Science Against Cancer (1950)

- Venice Film Festival, Venice: First Prize, Scientific Films, 1950
- American Film and Video Festival, New York: Blue Ribbon, Scientific, 1951

The Fight: Science Against Cancer (1950)

- 3rd Canadian Film Awards, Ottawa: Special Genie Award "for a splendid representation of a significant social problem", 1951
- 23rd Academy Awards, Los Angeles: Nominee: Best Documentary Short Subject, 1950

The Grievance (1954)

- 7th Canadian Film Awards, Toronto: Special Mention, Non-Theatrical Short, 1955
- Robert J. Flaherty Film Awards, City College Institute of Film Techniques, New York: Honourable Mention, 1955

The Stratford Adventure (1954)

- 7th Canadian Film Awards, Toronto: Genie Award for Film of the Year, 1955
- 7th Canadian Film Awards, Toronto: Genie Award for Best Theatrical Documentary, 1955
- Kootenay Film Festival, Nelson, British Columbia: First Prize, Artistic Achievement, 1956
- Edinburgh International Film Festival, Edinburgh, Scotland: Diploma of Merit, 1954
- Columbus International Film & Animation Festival, Columbus, Ohio: Award of Merit, Literature in Films, 1956
- Johannesburg International Film Festival, Johannesburg: Certificate of Merit, 1956
- 27th Academy Awards, Los Angeles: Nominee: Best Documentary Feature, 1955

Indochina (1955)

- Kootenay Film Festival, Nelson, British Columbia: Certificate of Merit, Sociology, 1957

The Man on the Assembly Line (1958)

- International Labour Film Festival of the International Labour Film Institute, Stockholm: Special Mention, 1960

The Skilled Worker (1958)

- International Labour Film Festival of the International Labour Film Institute, Stockholm: Special Mention, 1960

The Red Kite (1965)

- Columbus International Film & Animation Festival, Columbus, Ohio: Chris Award, First Prize, Religion, 1967
- Annual Landers Associates Awards, New York: Award of Merit, 1966

The Case of Barbara Parsons (1978)

- Yorkton Film Festival, Yorkton, Saskatchewan: Craft Award for Best Direction, 1979
- Yorkton Film Festival, Yorkton, Saskatchewan: Golden Sheaf Award for Best Drama, 1979
- American Film and Video Festival, New York: Red Ribbon, History & Biography, 1980
