= Derek May =

Canadian film director (1932–1992)

Derek May (1932–1992) was a Canadian animation, dramatic and documentary film director who worked primarily for the National Film Board of Canada (NFB). Originally a painter, his first film with the NFB was the 1966 experimental short, Angel. His documentary work often focused on the role of the artist in society. His other credits include collaborating the Donald Brittain on the narration for Helicopter Canada.

== Partial filmography ==
- Angel (1966)
- Helicopter Canada (1966) (narration)
- Niagara Falls (1967)
- McBus (1969)
- Sananguagat: Inuit Masterworks (1974), a documentary on Inuit artworks that coincided with a national exhibition of the Canadian Eskimo Arts Council.
- Pandora (1971)
- Off the Wall (1981), a 55-minute documentary on the Toronto art scene
- Krzysztof Wodiczkoi: Projections (1991), on the artist of the same name
