= Eugene Boyko =

Canadian filmmaker

Eugene Boyko csc
- Born: Eugene Boyko; 1923; Saskatoon, Saskatchewan
- Died: March 14, 2003; Richmond, British Columbia
- Other names: Jeep
- Occupation: filmmaker
- Known for: Helicopter Canada
- Spouse: Delia
- Children: 2

Eugene Boyko (1923 – March 14, 2003) known to many as "Jeep", was a Canadian filmmaker who worked with the National Film Board of Canada. An early film of his, Helicopter Canada, was nominated for an Academy Award for Best Documentary Feature.

Boyko started with the NFB in the early 1950s while it was still based in Ottawa. He moved with his wife Delia to Montreal when the head office was transferred.

In 1986, he was diagnosed with Haemochromatosis shortly after reading a magazine article about the work of Marie Warder, founder of the Canadian Haemochromatosis Society.

His cinematography credits include serving as director of photography of Donald Brittain's 1964 film Fields of Sacrifice. Fields was one of the films he was most proud of as it provided a sense of dignity of the fallen, without glorifying war. During the early 1970s he worked with a number of aboriginal film makers as part of the NFB efforts to help people tell their own stories, including the 1970 documentary film This Was the Time.

He worked on films across Canada and around the world, including India, Afghanistan, Ghana and throughout Europe. His films won many awards, including a Canadian Film Award for his 1968 short film Juggernaut. He attended the Oscars when his film Helicopter Canada was nominated. The film was Canada's office centennial film. For two years he travelled across the country filming. The helicopter used was an Alouette II, chosen for its ability at high altitudes in order to be able to film in the western mountains.

In the early 1970s he moved out to Vancouver, BC to be the technical producer for the NFB office. He eventually went back to his first love of being a hands-on film maker. He worked with many young film makers in British Columbia. During his time in Vancouver he worked on a number of films including directing Canaries to Clydesdales about two vets interior of the province as well as Pacific Highliner, about the fishing industry. Over his career he worked on close to 200 films in various capacities.

Prior to getting into film he worked as a taxi driver, specialty welder and in aircraft factories mainly in BC and Ontario. He initially got into still photography by accident. A fare left a camera in the car one day and a little later in the day he came across a streetcar accident. He use the camera to take some photos and took them to the local paper. He was offered some work based on what they saw. He did stills work in Saskatoon for a while. One of his favourite things was to take photos of visiting bands. He was interested in music and played in a number of bands.

Skilled like his father in woodwork and metal craft, he often developed special tools for film making, including a camera crane system. For a film about logging, he made a rig and pole system that allowed him to drop a film camera in a manner that simulated the falling of a tree.

He died in Richmond, BC on March 14, 2003. He was survived by a daughter Debbie (DB) Boyko and son Lee Boyko, both of whom work in the cultural sector.
