= Genie Award for Best Theatrical Short Film =

Discontinued annual Canadian media award

The Genie Award for Best Theatrical Short Film was a Canadian film award, historically presented by the Academy of Canadian Cinema and Television through its Genie Awards program to a film judged as the year's best short film. The award has been inclusive of short films in the live action drama, animated and documentary genres.

Originally presented by the Canadian Film Awards from their creation in 1949, the award was presented annually until 1964 with the exceptions of 1955, when an honourable mention was given but no formal winner was named, and 1957, when the award was not presented. The award was then not presented in 1965, 1966 or 1967.

Beginning in 1968, the Canadian Film Awards instituted separate award categories for "Film Over 30 Minutes" and "Film Under 30 Minutes". This continued for three years until 1971, when the single award for Best Theatrical Short was reinstituted. Except for 1974, when the Canadian Film Awards were entirely cancelled, the award was presented continuously thereafter until the Canadian Film Awards evolved into the Genie Awards in 1980, and continued to be presented in the early years of the Genie Awards.

After 1985, however, the Academy's presentation of the award varied from year to year, with a single award for Best Theatrical Short presented in some years, while separate awards for Best Live Action Short Drama, Best Animated Short and Best Short Documentary were presented in others. This variability continued until the 17th Genie Awards in 1996; since then, the separate genre categories have been consistently presented at all subsequent Genie or Canadian Screen Award ceremonies, and the Best Theatrical Short category is no longer in use.

== 1940s ==
Year	Film	Filmmakers	Ref
1949; 1st Canadian Film Awards
1949; 1st Canadian Film Awards	Who Will Teach Your Child?	Stanley Jackson	
1949; 1st Canadian Film Awards	Canadian Cameo Series	Bernard Norrish	

== 1950s ==
Year	Film	Filmmakers	Ref
1950; 2nd Canadian Film Awards
1950; 2nd Canadian Film Awards	North Shore (La Terre de Cain)	James Beveridge	
1950; 2nd Canadian Film Awards	Summer Is for Kids	Stanley Jackson	
1951; 3rd Canadian Film Awards
1951; 3rd Canadian Film Awards	After Prison, What?	Ron Weyman	
1952; 4th Canadian Film Awards
1952; 4th Canadian Film Awards	Opera School	Gudrun Parker	
1952; 4th Canadian Film Awards	The Fruitful Earth	Bernard Norrish	
1952; 4th Canadian Film Awards	The Man in the Peace Tower	Roger Blais	
1952; 4th Canadian Film Awards	Struggle for Oil	Ronald Dick	
1953; 5th Canadian Film Awards
1953; 5th Canadian Film Awards	The Bird Fancier (L'Homme aux oiseaux)	Bernard Devlin, Jean Palardy	
1953; 5th Canadian Film Awards	Canine Crimebusters	Bernard Norrish	
1953; 5th Canadian Film Awards	Citizen Varek	Gordon Burwash	
1953; 5th Canadian Film Awards	The Roaring Game	Bernard Norrish	
1953; 5th Canadian Film Awards	The Wind-Swept Isles (Les Îles-de-la-Madeleine)	Jean Palardy	
1954; 6th Canadian Film Awards
1954; 6th Canadian Film Awards	Farewell Oak Street	Grant McLean	
1954; 6th Canadian Film Awards	Danish Seining	Herman Noelle	
1954; 6th Canadian Film Awards	The Settler (L'Abatis)	Bernard Devlin	
1955; 7th Canadian Film Awards
1955; 7th Canadian Film Awards	High Tide in Newfoundland	Grant McLean	
1955; 7th Canadian Film Awards	Honourable mention only; no official winner named		
1956; 8th Canadian Film Awards
1956; 8th Canadian Film Awards	Gold	Colin Low	
1956; 8th Canadian Film Awards	Jolifou Inn	Colin Low	
1956; 8th Canadian Film Awards	The Shepherd	Julian Biggs	
1957; 9th Canadian Film Awards
1957; 9th Canadian Film Awards	No award presented		
1958; 10th Canadian Film Awards
1958; 10th Canadian Film Awards	The Sceptre and the Mace	John Howe	
1959; 11th Canadian Film Awards
1959; 11th Canadian Film Awards	Money Minters	Ted De Wit	
1959; 11th Canadian Film Awards	The Quest	Nicholas Balla, Stanley Jackson	
1959; 11th Canadian Film Awards	The Tall Country	Lew Parry, Osmond Borradaile	

== 1960s ==
Year	Film	Filmmakers	Ref
1960; 12th Canadian Film Awards
1960; 12th Canadian Film Awards	Royal River	Gordon Sparling	
1961; 13th Canadian Film Awards
1961; 13th Canadian Film Awards	Universe	Tom Daly, Colin Low, Roman Kroitor	
1962; 14th Canadian Film Awards
1962; 14th Canadian Film Awards	Morning on the Lièvre	David Bairstow, Guy Glover	
1963; 15th Canadian Film Awards
1963; 15th Canadian Film Awards	Nahanni	Donald Wilder	
1964; 16th Canadian Film Awards
1964; 16th Canadian Film Awards	Anniversary	William Weintraub	
1965; 17th Canadian Film Awards
1965; 17th Canadian Film Awards	No award presented		
1966; 18th Canadian Film Awards
1966; 18th Canadian Film Awards	No award presented		
1967; 19th Canadian Film Awards
1967; 19th Canadian Film Awards	No award presented		
1968; 20th Canadian Film Awards
1968; 20th Canadian Film Awards	Film Over 30 Minutes		
1968; 20th Canadian Film Awards	Do Not Fold, Staple, Spindle or Mutilate	John Howe	
1968; 20th Canadian Film Awards	Film Under 30 Minutes		
1968; 20th Canadian Film Awards	This Is No Time for Romance (Ça n'est pas le temps des romans)	Fernand Dansereau	
1969; 21st Canadian Film Awards
1969; 21st Canadian Film Awards	Film Over 30 Minutes		
1969; 21st Canadian Film Awards	Vertige	Gilles Boivin, Clément Perron	
1969; 21st Canadian Film Awards	And No Birds Sing	John Thomson	
1969; 21st Canadian Film Awards	Hey, Cinderella!	John T. Ross, Peter Miner	
1969; 21st Canadian Film Awards	Film Under 30 Minutes		
1969; 21st Canadian Film Awards	At Home	Martin Lavut	

== 1970s ==
Year	Film	Filmmakers	Ref
1970; 22nd Canadian Film Awards
1970; 22nd Canadian Film Awards	Film Over 30 Minutes		
1970; 22nd Canadian Film Awards	A Matter of Fat	William Weintraub	
1970; 22nd Canadian Film Awards	Film Under 30 Minutes		
1970; 22nd Canadian Film Awards	Blake	Bill Mason	
1971; 23rd Canadian Film Awards
1971; 23rd Canadian Film Awards	Don't Knock the Ox	Tony Ianzelo	
1972; 24th Canadian Film Awards
1972; 24th Canadian Film Awards	This Is a Photograph	Albert Kish	
1973; 25th Canadian Film Awards
1973; 25th Canadian Film Awards	Goodbye Sousa	Tony Ianzelo	
1974
1974	No award presented		
1975; 26th Canadian Film Awards
1975; 26th Canadian Film Awards	Along These Lines	Isabel Ripley, Patrick Watson, Peter Pearson	
1976; 27th Canadian Film Awards
1976; 27th Canadian Film Awards	Cooperage	Phillip Borsos	
1977; 28th Canadian Film Awards
1977; 28th Canadian Film Awards	Spartree	Phillip Borsos	
1977; 28th Canadian Film Awards	Outtakes	Barry Healey	
1977; 28th Canadian Film Awards	The Sand Castle (Le Chateau de sable)	Co Hoedeman	
1977; 28th Canadian Film Awards	Silent Sky	Laszlo George, David Mackay, Douglas Murray	
1978; 29th Canadian Film Awards
1978; 29th Canadian Film Awards	The Bronswik Affair (L'Affaire Bronswik)	Robert Awad, André Leduc	

== 1980s ==
Year	Film	Filmmakers	Ref
1980; 1st Genie Awards
1980; 1st Genie Awards	Nails	Phillip Borsos	
1980; 1st Genie Awards	Track Stars: The Unseen Heroes of Movie Sound	Terry Burke	
1980; 1st Genie Awards	Twice Upon a Time... (Il était deux fois)	Giles Walker	
1981; 2nd Genie Awards
1981; 2nd Genie Awards	The Strongest Man in the World	Halya Kuchmij	
1981; 2nd Genie Awards	Heavy Horse Pull	Roberta King, Ronald Squire	
1981; 2nd Genie Awards	History of the World in Three Minutes Flat	Michael Mills	
1982; 3rd Genie Awards
1982; 3rd Genie Awards	Zea	André Leduc, Robert Forget, Jean-Jacques Leduc	
1982; 3rd Genie Awards	Top Priority	Ishu Patel	
1982; 3rd Genie Awards	Voyage de nuit	Roger Frappier, Carole Mondello	
1983; 4th Genie Awards
1983; 4th Genie Awards	Elvis Gratton	Pierre Falardeau, Julien Poulin	
1983; 4th Genie Awards	Footsteps	Scott Barrie	
1983; 4th Genie Awards	The Only Game in Town	David Fine, Ron Mann	
1983; 4th Genie Awards	The Toaster (Le Toasteur)	Michel Bouchard	
1984; 5th Genie Awards
1984; 5th Genie Awards	Ted Baryluk's Grocery	Michael Scott, Wolf Koenig	
1984; 5th Genie Awards	Brushstrokes	Sylvie Fefer	
1984; 5th Genie Awards	Snow	Stephen Zoller, Tibor Takács	
1985; 6th Genie Awards
1985; 6th Genie Awards	Charade	Jon Minnis	
1985; 6th Genie Awards	I Think of You Often	Scott Barrie	
1985; 6th Genie Awards	Productivity and Performance by Alex K.	Nicolas Stiliadis, Syd Cappe	
1985; 6th Genie Awards	The Terrapin (La Terrapène)	Michel Bouchard, Jacques Pettigrew	
1986; 7th Genie Awards
1986; 7th Genie Awards	No award presented; see separate genre lists.		
1987; 8th Genie Awards
1987; 8th Genie Awards	No award presented; see separate genre lists.		
1988; 9th Genie Awards
1988; 9th Genie Awards	George and Rosemary	David Fine, Alison Snowden	
1988; 9th Genie Awards	Fashion 99	Karen Firus	
1988; 9th Genie Awards	Future Block	Kevin McCracken	
1989; 10th Genie Awards
1989; 10th Genie Awards	No award presented; see separate genre lists.		

== 1990s ==
Year	Film	Filmmakers	Ref
1990; 11th Genie Awards
1990; 11th Genie Awards	No award presented; see separate genre lists.		
1991; 12th Genie Awards
1991; 12th Genie Awards	Saeed	Mehra Meh	
1991; 12th Genie Awards	Edsville	James O'Regan	
1991; 12th Genie Awards	Man Descending	Raymond Lorenz, Neil Grieve	
1991; 12th Genie Awards	The Night of the Visitor (La Nuit du visiteur)	René Gueissaz	
1991; 12th Genie Awards	The Star Turn	Donald Booth	
1992; 13th Genie Awards
1992; 13th Genie Awards	No award presented; see separate genre lists.		
1993; 14th Genie Awards
1993; 14th Genie Awards	No award presented; see separate genre lists.		
1994; 15th Genie Awards
1994; 15th Genie Awards	Arrowhead	Emmet Sheil, Peter Lynch	
1994; 15th Genie Awards	Bob's Birthday	David Fine, Alison Snowden	
1994; 15th Genie Awards	Collateral Damage	Leonard Farlinger, Pamela Davenport	
1994; 15th Genie Awards	Save My Lost Nigga Soul	Damon D'Oliveira, Clement Virgo	
1994; 15th Genie Awards	Without Rockets	Keith Tomasek, Gary Yates	
1995; 16th Genie Awards
1995; 16th Genie Awards	Magical Flowers (Les fleurs magiques)	Jean-Marc Vallée	
1995; 16th Genie Awards	The End of the World in Four Seasons	Marcy Page, Paul Driessen	
1995; 16th Genie Awards	Movements of the Body: "1st Movement: The Gesture"	Wayne Traudt	
1995; 16th Genie Awards	Off Key	Karethe Linaae, Wade Ferley	
1995; 16th Genie Awards	You Love Me I Hate You	Myra Fried, Rosamund Owen	
1996; 17th Genie Awards
1996; 17th Genie Awards	The Home for Blind Women	Sandra Kybartas	
1996; 17th Genie Awards	Curtains (Rideau)	Mark Morgenstern, Stephanie Morgenstern	
1996; 17th Genie Awards	The Feeler	Colleen Murphy, Elizabeth Yake	
