= 11th Canadian Film Awards =

Canadian film awards ceremony

- Date: June 5, 1959
- Location: King Edward Hotel, Toronto, Ontario
- Hosted by: W. J. Sheridan

The 11th Canadian Film Awards were held on June 5, 1959 to honour achievements in Canadian film.

At this time, independent film production was improving and television production in Canada was booming, largely due to the Board of Broadcast Governors' anticipated Canadian Content ruling for television. Several production companies had been established, sound stages had been built; it was an encouraging atmosphere in which to recognize the previous year's filmmakers. The ceremony was hosted by W. J. Sheridan, the president of the Canadian Public Relations Society.

== Winners ==
- Film of the Year: Not awarded
- Feature Film: No entries submitted
- Theatrical Short: The Tall Country — Parry Films, Lew Parry producer, Osmond Borradaile director

Money Minters — Crawley Films, Ted De Wit producer and director
The Quest — National Film Board of Canada, Nicholas Balla producer, Stanley Jackson director

- Arts and Experimental: Not awarded
- TV Information: Winter Crossing at L'Isle-Aux-Coudres — National Film Board of Canada, Pierre Perrault producer, René Bonnière and Pierre Perrault, directors

One Day's Poison — National Film Board of Canada, David Bairstow producer, Donald Wilder director
Blood and Fire — National Film Board of Canada, Wolf Koenig and Roman Kroitor producers, Terence Macartney-Filgate director

- Films for Children: Not awarded
- Travel and Recreation: Grey Cup Festival '58 — Chetwynd Films, Arthur Chetwynd producer and director

Quetico — Christopher Chapman and Bill Mason producers, Christopher Chapman director

- General Information: The Living Stone — National Film Board of Canada, Tom Daly producer, John Feeney director
- Public Relations: Saskatchewan, Our University — Crawley Films, Edmund Reid producer and director
- Sales Promotion: Beauty to Live With — Crawley Films, Edmund Reid director
- Training and Instruction: Fire in Town — National Film Board of Canada, Peter Jones producer, Julian Biggs director
- Filmed Commercial: Du Maurier Cigarettes — Omega Productions, Richard J. Jarvis producer
- Amateur: Watch Out — John W. Ruddell

Pinoke — Jack S. Grassick

- Special Awards

- Canadian Broadcasting Corporation — "for its encouragement of the appreciation of good filmmaking over the years through Gerald Pratley's two weekly radio programs, The Movie Scene and Music from the Films".
- Dean Walker (writer) — "for encouragement of high standards in Canadian film production through his articles".
