= 15th Canadian Film Awards =

Canadian film awards ceremony

- Date: May 10, 1963
- Location: Queen Elizabeth Hotel, Montreal, Quebec
- Hosted by: Jeanine Beaubien

Highlights
- Film of the Year: Lonely Boy

The 15th Canadian Film Awards were held on May 10, 1963 to honour achievements in Canadian film.

This year saw a new record in film submissions: 175 productions from 44 producers, with the greatest increases in the TV Information and Travel and Recreation categories. As one in five submissions was a French-language film, more bi-lingual judges were added and, for the first time, the Canadian Society of Cinematographers joined the CFA.

The event took place in Montreal and returned to being a publicly-attended gala, hosted by Montreal International Theatre founder Jeanine Beaubien.

== Films ==
- Film of the Year: Lonely Boy — National Film Board of Canada, Roman Kroitor producer, Wolf Koenig and Roman Kroitor directors
- Feature Film: No entries submitted
- Theatrical Short: Nahanni — National Film Board of Canada, Donald Wilder director
- Arts and Experimental: Jour après jour (Day After Day) — National Film Board of Canada, Fernand Dansereau, Victor Jobin, Hubert Aquin producers, Clément Perron director
- TV Information: Listen with Your Eyes — Canadian Broadcasting Corporation, Philip Keatley producer and director

Les Annanacks — National Film Board of Canada, René Bonnière producer and director

- TV Entertainment: Not awarded
- Films for Children: Fantastique — National Film Board of Canada, Jacques Bobet producer, Fernand Rivard director

The Climates of North America — National Film Board of Canada, Joe Koenig director

- Travel and Recreation: Grey Cup Festival '62 — Chetwynd Films, Arthur Chetwynd producer and director

Wilderness Treasure — Wilber Sutherland, Bill Mason producers, Bill Mason director

- General Information: Lonely Boy — National Film Board of Canada, Roman Kroitor producer, Wolf Koenig and Roman Kroitor directors
- Public Relations: Arctic Island Wildcat — Spence Crilly Film Productions, Spence Crilly producer and director
- Sales Promotion: Partners in Progress — Crawley Films, James Turpie producer and director

Patterns — Williams Drege & Hill, Colin Y. Smith director

- Training and Instruction: Mathematics at Your Fingertips — National Film Board of Canada, Joe Koenig producer, John Howe director
- Filmed Commercial, Company or Product: Kraft Strawberry — Rabko Television Productions, Don McLean producer
- Filmed Commercial, Public Service: Not awarded
- Amateur: Cathy — Peter Gerretsen director

Certificate of Merit: Poison — Derek A. Davy, Maurice Stevens directors

== Non-Feature Craft Awards ==
Black and White Cinematography: Guy Borremans — Jour après jour (Day After Day) (NFB)
Colour Cinematography: Donald Wilder, Nahanni (NFB)
Honourable Mention: Christopher Chapman, Saguenay (Crawley Films)

== Special awards ==
Four-Line Conics, (NFB) Trevor Fletcher director — "in recognition of its imaginative and experimental illustration of a specialized mathematical concept".
Dorothy Burritt and Oscar Burritt — "for pioneering work over three decades for the development and appreciation of film in Canada".
Gaudry Delisle — "for his many years of devoted service for the promotion of a wider understanding and better use of films for educational purposes"
