= Stan Brede =

Canadian cinematographer

Stan Brede was a Canadian cinematographer. He was most noted for his role as Director of Photography for Crawley Films, which produced hundreds of films through the 1940s, '50s and '60s.

In 1964, at the 16th Canadian Film Awards, Brede won a special award for his work on James W. Turpie's short documentary Brampton Builds a Car.
