= Van Horne Mansion =

Demolished house in Montreal, Canada

Coordinates: 45.5011°N 73.5772°W

- French: Maison Van Horne
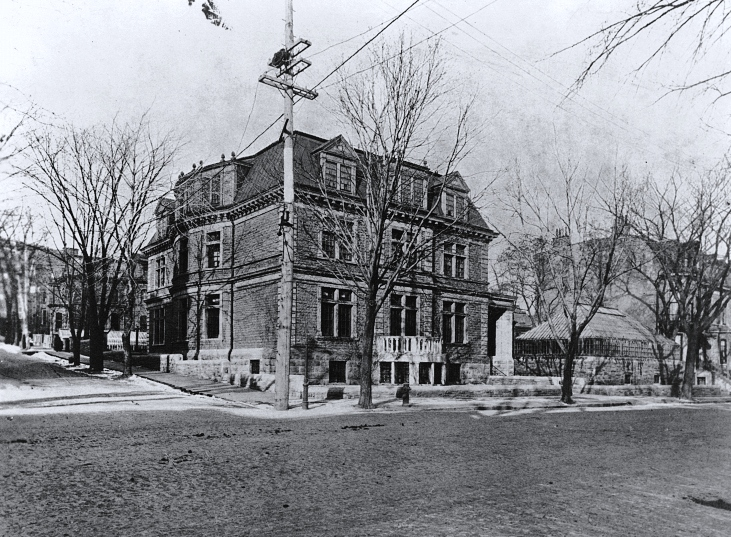
- The Van Horne Mansion, c. 1890
- Interactive map of the Van Horne Mansion area

General information
- Type: Private house
- Architectural style: Italianate
- Location: Golden Square Mile, Sherbrooke Street, Montreal, Quebec
- Construction started: 1868
- Completed: 1869
- Demolished: 1973
- Client: John Hamilton
- Landlord: John Hamilton; Sir William Van Horne

Technical details
- Floor count: 3

Design and construction
- Architects: John William Hopkins and Daniel Berkley Wily

The Van Horne Mansion (French: Maison Van Horne) was a classic greystone house on Sherbrooke Street at the corner of Stanley Street in Montreal's Golden Square Mile. It was built in 1869 for John Hamilton, President of the Merchant's Bank of Montreal, Quebec.

In 1889, Sir William Cornelius Van Horne, President of the Canadian Pacific Railway, purchased the property and it remained in his family until it was controversially demolished in 1973. Despite the public outcry over its proposed destruction, Mayor Jean Drapeau declared that it could not be preserved for cultural reasons as it was not part of Quebec's culture, its history being Anglo Canadian, not French Canadian. With Drapeau's support, it was bulldozed in the middle of the night by developer David Azrieli, who replaced it with a concrete tower block. The Sofitel Hotel today stands at the spot once occupied by the Van Horne mansion.

== History ==
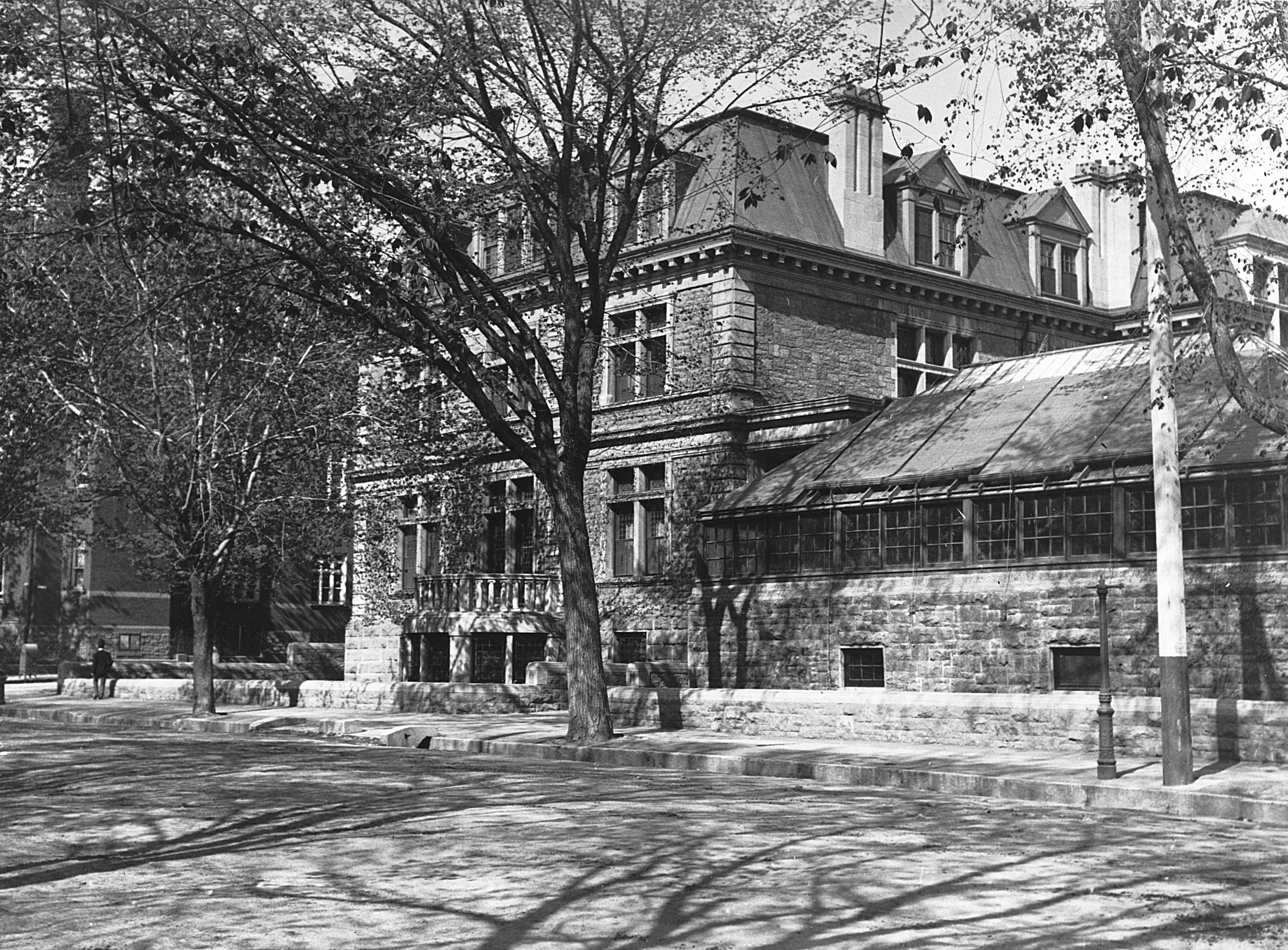
Van Horne House, c. 1900

Van Horne hired Bruce Price's architectural firm, who had done much of the work for the Canadian Pacific Railway, to enlarge the old Hamilton's Italianate house to fifty-two rooms. Hamilton had hired architect John William Hopkins (also with Daniel Berkley Wily) and was completed in 1869.

It was Edward Colonna (died 1948), an architect who had previously worked for Louis Comfort Tiffany before being hired by Price, who carried out the alterations to the Van Horne house. Colonna redid the entire ground floor and possibly much of the first floor, creating a spacious area with well-proportioned rooms and plenty of wall-space for Van Horne's art collection. The interior of Van Horne's house, from its fireplaces, ceilings and gold leaf walls, was the first example of Art Nouveau in Canada. Van Horne claimed to like homes "big and bulky like myself", but he had one of the best private art and pottery collections in North America and wanted a house he could share with it. The building was damaged by a fire on April 3, 1933, which led to the loss of part of Van Horne's private art collection.

== Van Horne Art Collection ==
As a child, Van Horne collected fossils. He was also an excellent violinist and artist in his own right. When he was older, Van Horne was not just a serious collector, he had a passion for art: "A picture that you feel you do not really want is always an incubus and a source of dissatisfaction".

He started collecting on his business trips around the world in the 1880s. By 1892, he had confidence enough in his knowledge to catalogue his most prized possessions, now found in the Montreal Museum of Fine Arts. He not only built up the most important collection in Canada, but added to it a comprehensive library on art history. He was meticulous in not just his choice of paintings, but also in his studies into the lives of the artists too. His collection featured the works of Velázquez, Hals, Rembrandt, Hogarth, Gainsborough, Reynolds, Constable and Turner. He also collected many modern works, and in his catalogue of 1892, all but two of the forty nine works listed were from the 19th century. In 1926 Caroline Pierson, the granddaughter of Allard Pierson, visited his daughter Adeline van Horne, and after viewing the collection, she wrote a letter describing what she saw, mentioning 4 Rembrandts, 4 Frans Hals, and a Bol and a Fabricius in the "red room". In April 1933 a fire damaged some of the paintings, but the same year Frits Lugt paid a visit to an exhibition of the collection and made notes about several of the same paintings, indicating they were not all lost. In 1972 Ernst van de Wetering and Professor Levie, as representatives of the Rembrandt Research Project, paid a visit to Margaret (Hannon) Van Horne, widow of grandson Billy van Horne, to inspect the 4 Rembrandts. One was stolen before they could inspect it, and of the remaining three, they only authenticated "The Young Rabbi".

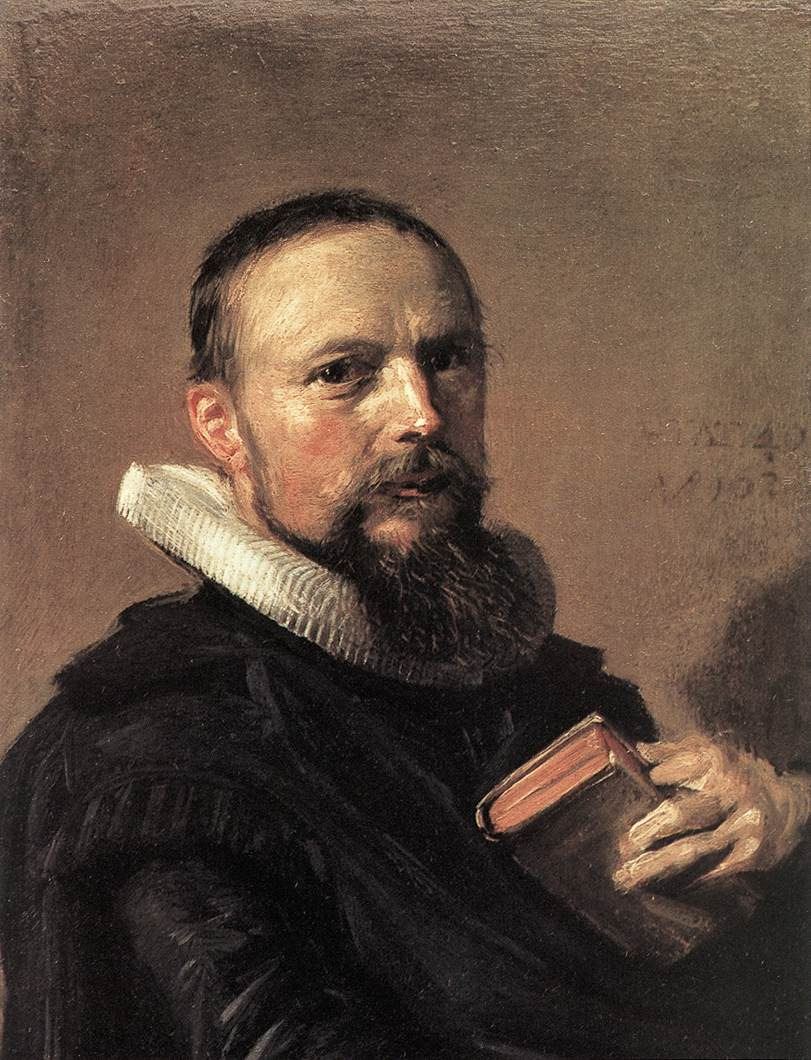
Portrait of Samuel Ampzing by Frans Hals

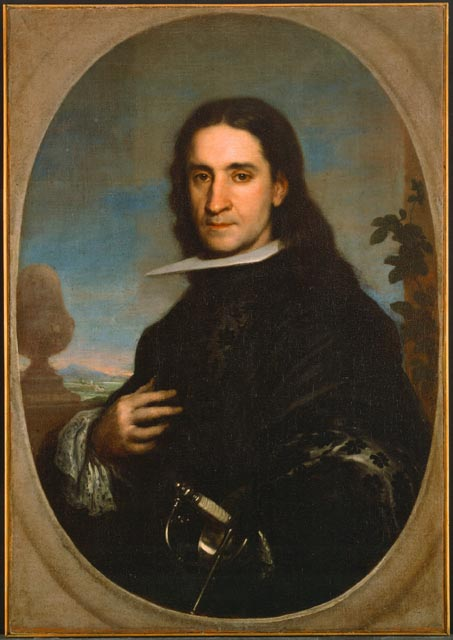
Portrait of a Nobleman by Bartolomé Esteban Murillo

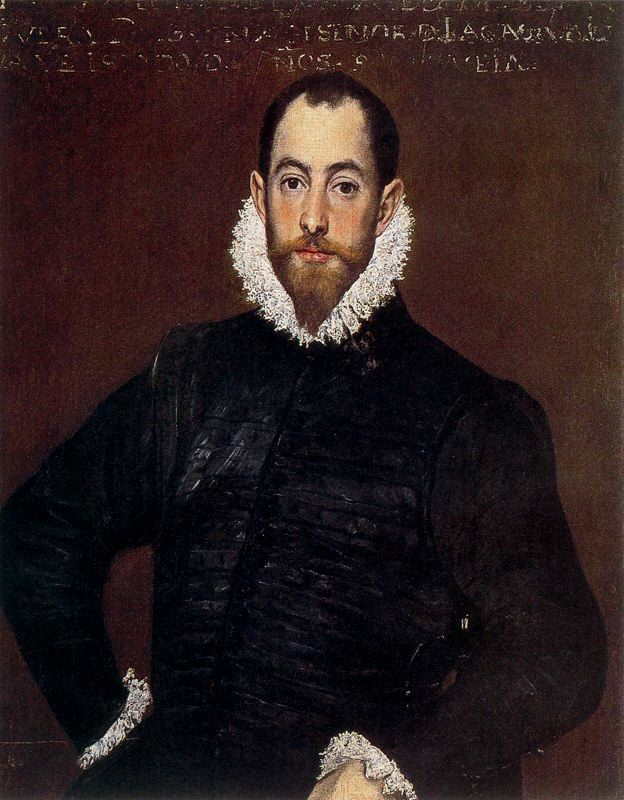
Portrait of a Gentleman from the Casa de Leiva by El Greco

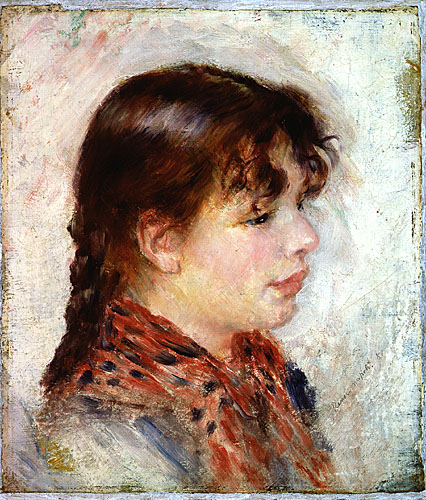
Head of a young neapolitan girl by Pierre-Auguste Renoir

The treasures in the Van Horne Mansion also included one of the best collections in North America of ancient Japanese porcelain and pottery. Typically, Van Horne became an expert on the art of firing and judging the overall finish of a specimen. His knowledge and collection earned him an invitation to visit Japan as the personal guest of Meiji, Emperor of Japan.

== Demolition ==
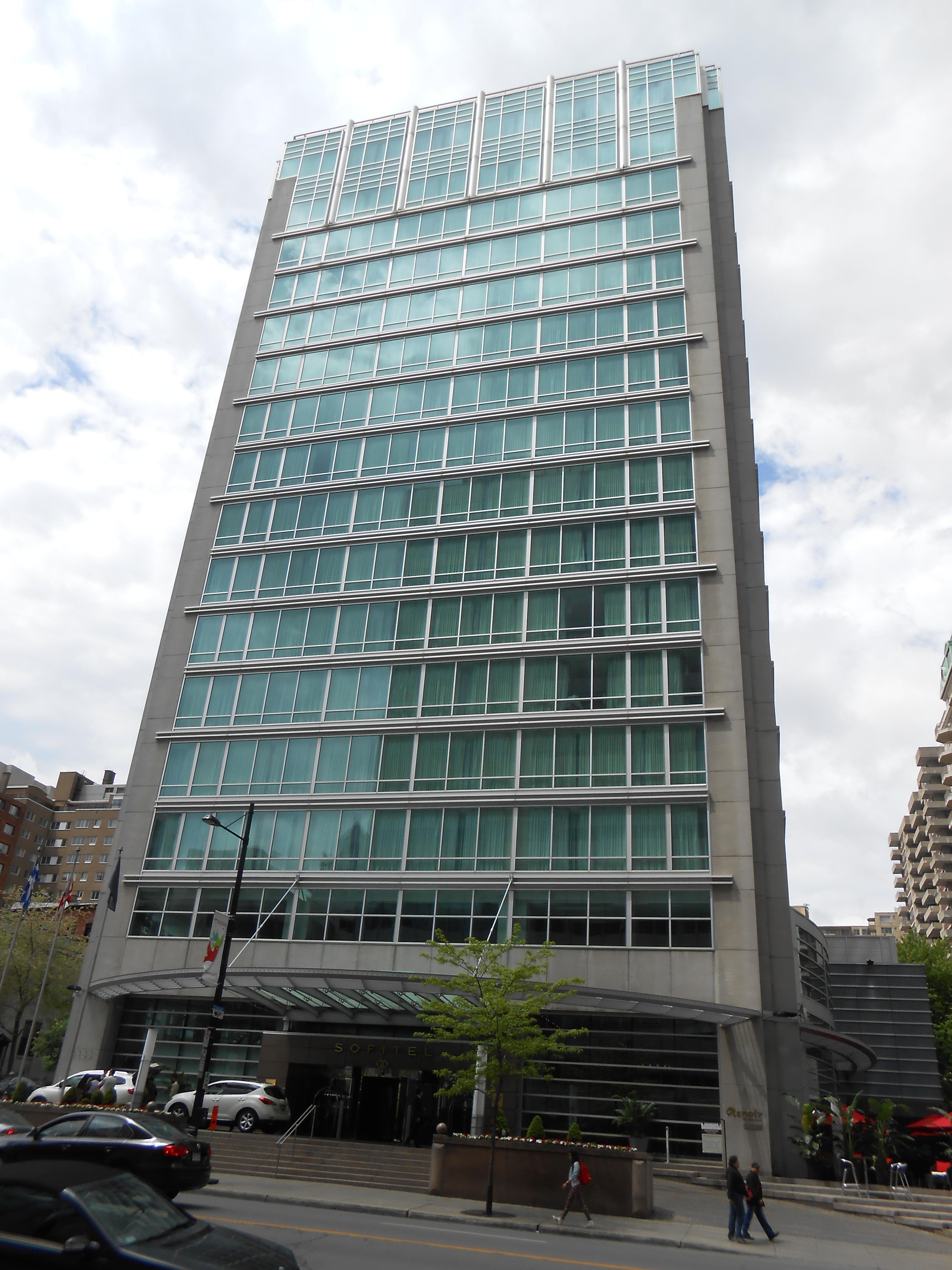
Sofitel Montreal Golden Mile

The building was controversially torn down by developer David Azrieli in 1973 under the mayoralty of Jean Drapeau, who declared that it was impossible to preserve it for cultural reasons because it was not part of Quebec's culture - Hamilton and Van Horne being Anglophone Quebecers (Hamilton was from Ontario and Van Horne was American). It was replaced by a sixteen-storey concrete tower. The mansion's destruction sparked the creation of the heritage preservation group Save Montreal. Journalist William Weintraub includes the house and its demolition in his 1993 documentary, The Rise and Fall of English Montreal, identifying the significance of the building to the local Anglo community's heritage.
