= Money Minters =

- Les Monnayeurs
- Directed by: Ted De Wit
- Written by: Munroe Scott
- Produced by: F. R. Crawley; Ted De Wit
- Cinematography: Frank Stokes; Grant Crabtree
- Edited by: James W. Turpie
- Music by: William McCauley
- Production company: Crawley Films
- Distributed by: National Film Board of Canada
- Release date: 1958
- Running time: 11 minutes
- Country: Canada
- Language: English

Money Minters (French: Les Monnayeurs) is a Canadian short documentary film, directed by Ted De Wit and released in 1958. Sponsored by INCO and the Royal Canadian Mint, the film documents the process of making a coin from the initial mining of metal ore at Sudbury to the coin's final production at the Royal Canadian Mint.

The film was one of three co-winners, alongside The Quest and The Tall Country, of the Canadian Film Award for Best Theatrical Short Film at the 11th Canadian Film Awards in 1959.
