= John Feeney (filmmaker) =

New Zealand director and photographer (1922–2006)

- Born: John Patrick Feeney; 10 August 1922; Ngāruawāhia, New Zealand
- Died: 6 December 2006 (aged 84); Wellington, New Zealand
- Education: Victoria University of Wellington
- Occupations: Director, photographer, writer
- Years active: 1946–2006
- Awards: see below

John Feeney (10 August 1922 – 6 December 2006) was a New Zealand-born director, photographer and writer.

== Early life ==
Feeney was born in Ngāruawāhia, near Hamilton, on New Zealand's North Island. He became fascinated by photography at a very early age and, at age 8, was given his first camera which, for the rest of his life, he would refer to as his 'magic lantern'. While attending Victoria University in Wellington, he entered the Royal New Zealand Naval Volunteer Reserve to do his compulsory service but, with conscription during WWII, was transferred into the Royal New Zealand Navy. He took part in the D-Day landings of 1944 and, a year later, was discharged with the rank of Lieutenant. He returned to New Zealand, where he took the job of research assistant with New Zealand's War History Branch, which was working on its 38-volume Official History of New Zealand in the Second World War 1939–45. That experience led him to be hired, in 1947, by the National Film Unit of New Zealand.

== National Film Unit of New Zealand ==
At the time, the mandate of the government-owned the National Film Unit of New Zealand (NFU) was to produce educational films for domestic audiences, and films which would project a favourable image of New Zealand and attract tourism, trade, immigrants and investment. When Feeney arrived, he was put to work as a production assistant on the NFU’s "Weekly Review", a weekly series of short films distributed throughout the country’s theatres. The pressure to produce the series on strict deadlines forced Feeney to quickly learn filmmaking skills and, by 1948, he was able to direct. His first known film was Hutt Valley ... New School for Taita and it is known that he was the editor on Naval Force 75 (1950); his first credit was for 1949’s New Golden Hind Sails North Supplying Raoul & Niue Islands. It is thought that Feeney edited, wrote, photographed and/or directed as many as 30 films for the NFU but, by 1949, the unit had stopped including credits in its films. Most of the films from this era have also been lost.

In 1951, the NFU ceased production of the Weekly Review and Feeney was put to work on informational films promoting soil conservation and traffic safety. He was then able to produce documentaries; the result was the four critically-acclaimed films that would start his career: The Legend of the Whanganui River (1952), Kōtuku (1954), Pumicelands (1954) and Hot Earth (1955).

On the strength of these films, Feeney was offered a bursary to study film production at the College of Cinematography in Paris. However, the NFU sent him to Canada first, to see how the National Film Board of Canada (NFB) was operated; while there, he was asked if he’d like to make a film, and he created the 1954 Hidden Power. That film, along with his four NFU films, screened at the 1955 Edinburgh International Film Festival; The Legend of the Whanganui River earned a Diploma of Merit. Based on their reception and quality, NFB producer Tom Daly offered him a job. Feeney had intended to return to New Zealand, but he discovered that his delay in going to France and led to the expiration of his bursary and the loss of a promotion at the NFU. The Canadian position offered a much larger salary, more resources and more opportunity. In 1955, Feeney moved to Montreal and joined the NFB as a full-time filmmaker.

== National Film Board of Canada ==
Despite reporting that he found adapting to life in Montreal to be difficult, Feeney stayed with the NFB for 10 years, producing 10 films. Daly noted that Feeney has a particular affinity for photographing the landscape and put him to work on documentaries about the Arctic and Inuit culture. His first such film, The Living Stone, earned him several awards, including an Oscar nomination.

His last NFB film, the 1964 documentary Eskimo Artist: Kenojuak, a groundbreaking look at the process of Inuk artist Kenojuak Ashevak, earned more awards, including a second Oscar nomination and the BAFTA Award for Best Short Film. (The NFB notes: "...this is an archival film that makes use of the word “Eskimo,” an outdated and offensive term. While the origin of the word is a matter of some contention, it is no longer used in Canada. The term was formally rejected by the Inuit Circumpolar Council in 1980 and has subsequently not been in use at the NFB.")

In 1959, while shooting Pangnirtung, in what is now Nunavut, bad weather had forced a stop in filming and, Feeney wrote, he passed the time reading a magazine he’d found about Africa’s Mountains of the Moon, at the source of the Nile. The subject intrigued him, and he starting researching the Nile, its people and the temples of Egypt and Nubia.

At this time, governments around the world were increasingly interested in developing their own filmmaking industries, and it was not unusual for them to ask the NFB to send directors to coach their filmmakers–the governments of Romania and Czechoslovakia had asked for Feeney specifically. In 1963, Egypt’s Minister of Culture, Dr. Tharwat Okasha, came to the NFB offices and asked if one of its directors would spend a year in Egypt filming the highly anticipated ‘last’ flood of the Nile. Feeney jumped at the chance; he would spend the next 40 years in Egypt.

== Egypt ==
In June 1964, Feeney and a four-man Egyptian film crew set out from Cairo to capture the flood on film, following its progress for 3200 kilometers (2000 mi). This had never been done before, and the 83-minute CinemaScope documentary Fountains of the Sun became the only filmed record of the event. After showing at Cairo cinemas, the film, which took four years to complete, became mired in red tape and fell into obscurity. In 2001, it was nominated for inclusion in UNESCO’s Memory of the World Programme. The nomination called it “one of the most important films about the River Nile…showing for the first time on the screen the sources and wonders of the White and Blue Niles.”

In his writings, Feeney mentions ‘filming’ and it is reasonable to assume that he would not have given up film-making. However, there is no record of any film directed by him between 1969 and 1984, when he was brought to Saudi Arabia by Abdallah Jum'ah at Saudi Aramco to produce Era of Discovery, a 21-minute documentary about the early history of company.

Feeney’s association with Saudi Aramco began in 1973, when he started working for Aramco World, the company’s bi-monthly magazine. Feeney wrote one article nearly every year until 2006; each article covered a different aspect of Egyptian culture and, for each one, he provided 24 photographs. He became an expert on Egyptian food, and turned to food photography, creating The Red Tea of Egypt (2001), Desert Truffles Galore (2002) and Egyptian Soups, Hot and Cold (2006). In 1995, the American University in Cairo Press published his book Thirty Years in Egypt.

In 2003, Feeney returned to New Zealand, where he completed his last book, Photographing Egypt: Forty Years Behind the Lens. He attended its 2005 launch, which was held at the American University in Cairo, in the Sony Gallery for Photography at the Adham Center for Television Journalism. The show, John Feeney Retrospective: 40 Years Photographing Egypt, featured more than 60 of Feeney's photographs.

Feeney died in Wellington New Zealand in 2006.

== Legacy ==
Eskimo Artist: Kenojuak found new life in 1992, when filmmakers Colin Low and Tony Ianzelo combined archival and contemporary footage of Kenojuak in Momentum, Canada's IMAX HD film for Expo '92. Pumicelands was used in the 2015 documentary The Ground We Won.

Through pre-production, production and post-production of Fountains of the Sun, Feeney kept a diary. There are eight books, with entries recounting daily events and personal reflections about film-making, travel, administrative and financial matters, and distribution and exhibition of the film. The diary describes Feeney’s experiences filming in Khartoum, Uganda and the Ruwenzori Mountains, working with the ‘Studio Msir Lab’, and recording the documentary's music. John Feeney's Nile Diaries, and all of Feeney's papers and photographs, were donated to the National Library of New Zealand, Alexander Turnbull Library, Wellington.

== Filmography ==
National Film Unit of New Zealand

- Hutt Valley ... New School for Taita - short film 1948, editor
- New Golden Hind Sails North Supplying Raoul & Niue Islands - short film, Stanhope Andrews 1949 - writer and editor
- Naval Force 75 - short film 1950 - editor
- Pedestrians or Jaywalkers? - short film 1952, writer, editor, director
- A List of Names - short film 1952, writer, editor
- The Legend of the Whanganui River - short film 1952 - writer, editor, director
- Charting the Sea - H.M.N.Z.S. Lachlan - short film 1953, writer, editor, director
- Kōtuku - short film 1954 - writer, editor, director
- Pumicelands - short film 1954 - writer, editor, director
- Hot Earth - short film 1955 - writer, editor, director

National Film Board of Canada

- On the Spot: Hidden Power - documentary short 1954 - director
- On the Spot: Food Facts - documentary short 1955 - director
- On the Spot: Prairie University - documentary short 1955 - director
- The Living Stone - documentary short 1958 - writer, editor, director
- Pangnirtung - documentary short 1959 - writer, editor, director
- Fifty Miles from Poona - documentary short, Fali Bilimoria 1959 - writer, editor
- Arctic Outpost: Pangnirtung, N.W.T. - documentary short 1960 - writer, editor, director
- Sky - experimental film, 1963 - writer, editor, director
- A Christmas Fantasy - short film 1963 - editor, cinematographer, director
- Eskimo Artist: Kenojuak - documentary short 1964 - writer, editor, director

Egypt

- Fountains of the Sun, aka Yanabie Al Shams - documentary 1969 - writer, editor, cinematographer, director
- Era of Discovery – documentary short 1984 – producer, director

== Awards ==
The Legend of the Whanganui River (1952)

- Edinburgh International Film Festival, Edinburgh, Scotland: Diploma of Merit, 1953

The Living Stone (1958)

- Winnipeg Film Council Annual Film Festival, Winnipeg: Best Canadian Film, Short Subject, 1959
- American Film and Video Festival, New York: Blue Ribbon, Graphic Arts, Sculpture and Architecture, 1960
- Rapallo International Film Festival, Rapallo, Italy: Special Prize, Cup of the Minister of Tourism and Entertainment for Best Foreign Film, 1960
- Rapallo International Film Festival, Rapallo, Italy: Second Prize, Silver Cup of the Province of Genoa, 1960
- International Festival of Films on People and Countries, La Spezia, Italy: Silver Cup for the Most Popular Film of the Festival, 1967
- International Festival of Films on People and Countries, La Spezia, Italy: Medal for Best Ethnological Film, 1967
- International Maritime and Exploration Film Festival, Toulon, France: Ergo Prize of the Presidency of the Republic, 1969
- Festival of Tourist and Folklore Films, Brussels: CIDALC Medal of Honour, 1960
- Locarno Film Festival, Locarno, Switzerland: Diploma of Honour, 1959
- 11th Canadian Film Awards, Toronto: Award of Merit, General Information, 1959
- International Filmfestival Mannheim-Heidelberg, Mannheim: Special Commendation, 1959
- Robert J. Flaherty Film Awards, City College Institute of Film Techniques: Honourable Mention, 1959
- SODRE International Festival of Documentary and Experimental Films, Montevideo, Uruguay: Honourable Mention 1960
- 31st Academy Awards, Los Angeles: Nominee: Best Documentary Short Film, 1958

Pangnirtung (1959)

- Okanagan Film Festival, Kelowna, British Columbia: First Prize, 1960

Sky (1963)

- Columbus International Film & Animation Festival, Columbus, Ohio: Chris Award, Special Fields, 1964
- Jubilee International Film Festival, Swift Current, Saskatchewan: First Prize, Natural Sciences, 1964

A Christmas Fantasy (1963)

- Columbus International Film & Animation Festival, Columbus, Ohio: Chris Certificate 1964

Eskimo Artist: Kenojuak (1964)

- 18th British Academy Film Awards, London: BAFTA Award for Best Short Film, 1964
- Cork International Film Festival, Cork, Ireland: Statuette of St. Finbarr - First Prize, Art Films, 1964
- Festival of Tourist and Folklore Films, Brussels: Gold Medal - First Prize, 1965
- Melbourne International Film Festival, Melbourne: Silver Boomerang - Second Prize, 1965
- International Exhibition of Scientific Film, Buenos Aires: Second Prize, Category C, 1965
- Columbus International Film & Animation Festival, Columbus, Ohio: Chris Award, Education & Information, 1966
- American Film and Video Festival, New York: First Prize, Graphic Arts, Sculpture and Architecture, 1967
- Panama International Film Festival, Panama City, Panama: Grand Prize for Best Documentary, 1966
- Thessaloniki International Film Festival, Thessaloniki, Greece: First Prize, Foreign Film, 1967
- Festival of Cultural Films, La Felguera, Spain: Silver Plaque, 1967
- Philadelphia International Festival of Short Films, Philadelphia: Award of Exceptional Merit, 1971
- FIBA International Festival of Buenos Aires, Buenos Aires: Diploma of Honor, 1968
- Tokyo International Film Festival, Tokyo, Japan: Certificate of Merit, 1966
- Vancouver International Film Festival, Vancouver: Certificate of Merit, 1964
- Venice Film Festival, Venice, Italy: Special Mention, 1964
- 37th Academy Awards, Los Angeles: Nominee: Best Documentary Short Subject, 1965

== Bibliography ==
- Al-Azhar, A Millennial, article & photography, Aramco World 1973
- The Magic of The Mashrabiyas, article & photography, Aramco World 1974
- The Good Things of Egypt, article & photography, Aramco World 1975
- Choreography in Cairo, article & photography, Aramco World 1977
- A Hidden Beauty, article & photography, Aramco World 1978
- Siwa: Resort of Kings, photography, Aramco World 1979
- A Harvest of Scents, article & photography, Aramco World 1980
- Under the Big Top in Cairo, article & photography, Aramco World 1981
- The Hidden Power, article & photography, Aramco World 1982
- Tapestries of Harraniya, article & photography, Aramco World 1982
- Memories of Samarkand, article & photography, Aramco World 1984
- The Minarets of Cairo, article & photography, Aramco World 1985
- Tentmakers of Cairo, article & photography, Aramco World 1986
- From Water All That Lives, article & photography, Aramco World
- Imbaba, article & photography, Aramco World 1989
- Ramadan’s Lanterns, article & photography, Aramco World 1992
- Fortress on the Mountain, article & photography, Aramco World 1993
- The Village of the Past, article & photography, Aramco World 1995
- Thirty Years in Egypt, book, American University in Cairo Press 1995
- Cairo's Domes, Minarets and Mushrabiyas, book, American University in Cairo Press 1997
- Shadows of Fancy, article & photography, Aramco World 1999
- Building for the 800 Million: An Interview, article & photography, Aramco World 1999
- The Red Tea of Egypt, book, Aramco World 2001
- Desert Truffles Galore, book, Aramco World 2002
- The Joys of the Bath, article & photography, Aramco World 2004
- A City Adorned, article & photography, Aramco World 2005
- Photographing Egypt: Forty Years Behind the Lens, book, American University in Cairo Press 2005
- Egyptian Soups, Hot and Cold, book, Aramco World 2006
