= The Loon's Necklace =

- Directed by: F. R. Crawley
- Written by: Douglas Leechman; Judith Crawley
- Produced by: F. R. Crawley
- Starring: F. R. Crawley
- Narrated by: George Gorman; François Bertrand
- Cinematography: Grant Crabtree
- Edited by: Judith Crawley
- Music by: Marius Barbeau
- Production company: Crawley Films
- Distributed by: Canadian Education Network; Encyclopedia Britannica Films; National Film Board of Canada
- Release date: 1948
- Running time: 12 min.
- Country: Canada
- Language: English
- Budget: $7,000-10,000
- Box office: $1.5 million

The Loon's Necklace (Le Collier magique) is a 1948 Canadian film, produced and directed by F. R. Crawley. It recounts the Tsimshian legend of how the loon received the distinctive band of white markings on its neck.

== Story ==
The Loon's Necklace is based on a folk tale known across Alaska, Northern Canada, and Greenland, The Blind Man and the Loon. The variant of the tale used by Crawley, and with the advice of ethnographer Marius Barbeau, was recorded during the early 1930s in British Columbia by National Museum of Canada anthropologist Douglas Leechman.

The film centers around Kelora, a blind Tsimshian medicine man who lived in the British Columbia village of Shalus and spent his time at the river, with the Loon, who he believed was his father. One year, a bad winter left the village close to famine and it was decided that the village would travel to a neighbouring village to trade for food. Kelora warned that this would leave the village, and the Loon, unprotected against wolves, but his warning was ignored. He put on his sacred dentalium shell necklace and chanted sacred songs; this caused magic arrows to appear and kill the wolves. In the spring, Kelora went in search of the Loon and asked that his sight be restored. The Loon had Kelora climb onto his back and swam four times beneath the water's surface. After the fourth swim, Kelora could once again see. In gratitude, he tossed his necklace of shells at the Loon; the collar wrapped itself the bird's neck and a few shells broke off and landed on its back.

== Production ==
Crawley shot the film in Quebec, with a local naturalist as his guide. He filmed the loons in their natural habitat, and used a combination of photography, cell animation and unusual colour and lighting arrangements to achieve the film's mysterious atmosphere.

The film is narrated by George Gorman and François Bertrand, and performed by actors in traditional West Coast First Nations masks in front of a backdrop of brightly coloured oil paintings. The masks, which represent emotion, are the original masks, 100 years old at the time, which were loaned to Crawley by Leechman. They are from the Bering Sea Eskimos, and the Haida, Nootka, Kwakiutl and Iroquois peoples.

The Loon's Necklace was produced by Crawley Films with a budget of between $7,000 (equivalent to $97,407 in 2025) and $10,000 (equivalent to $139,153 in 2025). It was made for the National Film Board of Canada (NFB), which rejected it, so Crawley sold the Canadian rights for $5,000. to another of his long-standing clients, Imperial Oil.

== Reception ==
When the NFB rejected the film, Crawley considered it a failure, but it soon garnered critical praise. By 1949, 100 prints were in distribution in Canada, Imperial Oil distributed another 125 prints to the Canadian Education Network, and Encyclopedia Britannica Films was distributing it in the U.S. It was screened at the 1949 Edinburgh Film Festival, the Salzburg Festival, and the International Exhibition of Short Films in Buenos Aires. In 1950, the Canadian Library Association put it on its list of Best Canadian Films 1935-1950; in 1953, William Chapman and Stanley Kuniz, professors at New York's The New School, introduced the film in a 10-week course titled Art in Motion. By 1952, 1.5 million Canadians had seen The Loon's Necklace; over the next 30 years, when the NFB became its distributor, it earned $1.5 million.

== Awards ==
- Canadian Film Award for Film of the Year, 1st Canadian Film Awards 1949.
- Silver Medal (first prize), Venice Film Festival 1949
- First Prize, Art and Music Films, Cleveland Film Festival, Cleveland, Ohio 1949
- Ente del Gera Cup (first prize), Colour Films category, International Cinema Festival, Gardone Riviera 1949
- Best Short Film Exhibited in Canada, New Liberty Magazine Awards 1950
- Best Experimental Film, International Congress of Art Films, Brussels 1950
- Award of Merit, Ten Best Educational Films of the Year, Scholastic Teacher's Annual Film and Filmstrip Awards 1950
- Best North American Film, First International Art Films Festival, Woodstock, New York 1951
- Award for Standards of Excellence, Illinois Institute of Technology 1952
- Diploma of Honour, Locarno Film Festival 1958
- First Award for Entertainment Films, International Film Festival, Victoria, British Columbia 1962

== Works cited ==
- Melnyk, George (2004). One Hundred Years of Canadian Cinema. University of Toronto Press. ISBN 080203568X.
