= Guy Borremans =

Belgian-Canadian cinematographer and photographer

Guy Borremans (July 11, 1934 - December 29, 2012) was a Belgian-Canadian cinematographer and photographer. He was most noted for his work on Clément Perron's film Day After Day (Jour après jour), for which he won the Canadian Film Award for Best Black-and-White Cinematography at the 15th Canadian Film Awards in 1963.

Born and raised in Dinant, Belgium, Borremans moved to Canada with his family in 1951. Strongly influenced by surrealism, he was closely associated with the Les Automatistes arts movement. As a cinematographer, he was associated primarily with documentary films, with other credits including Wealth of a Nation (1964), a production for the US Information Agency directed by William Greaves, À St-Henri le cinq septembre, Golden Gloves, Manouane River Lumberjacks (Bûcherons de la Manouane) and 24 heures ou plus.

He was married to actress Luce Guilbeault. Following her death in 1991, he remarried to Mary Kostman.

He died on December 29, 2012, in Trois-Rivières. In 2016 Ariel Borremans, his son with Guilbeault, published the book Ma mère dans l'oeil de mon père, a collection of his photographs of Guilbeault throughout their marriage.
