= Arthur Chetwynd =

Canadian film producer (1913–2004)

- Born: 28 October 1913; Walhachin, British Columbia, Canada
- Died: 11 July 2004 (aged 90); Cobourg, Ontario, Canada
- Other names: Sir Arthur Ralph Talbot Chetwynd, 8th Baronet of Brocton Hall, Staffordshire
- Occupations: Producer, director
- Years active: 1950–1988
- Parent: Ralph Chetwynd

Arthur Chetwynd (28 October 1913 – 11 July 2004) was a Canadian film producer and founder and president of the pioneering film production company Chetwynd Films. He was an early, prolific producer of high-quality sponsored short documentaries; it has been estimated that he produced as many as 3,000 films.

At the 12th Canadian Film Awards in 1960, Chetwynd was presented with a Special Award "for dedicated service in the interest of Canadian filmmakers as an executive officer of the Association of Motion Picture Producers and Laboratories of Canada". In 1981, the 2nd Genie Awards presented a one-time Chetwynd Award for Business Promotion.

== Early life ==
Arthur Ralph Talbot Chetwynd was born in the ghost town of Walhachin, a once-affluent hamlet in Thompson Country, in the British Columbia Interior. His father, Ralph Chetwynd was an Englishman who had moved to Canada to go into the cattle and fruit-growing business; he became one of the founders of the Pacific Great Eastern Railway as well as a Member of the Legislative Assembly for the Cariboo, and British Columbia's Minister of Trade and Industry, Minister of Railways and Fisheries, and Minister of Agriculture. The city of Chetwynd, British Columbia is named after him.

He grew up in Vernon, in the British Columbia fruit-growing region of Okanagan. After graduating from Vernon Preparatory School, he attended the University of British Columbia. From 1943 to 1945, he was Chief Instructor for Medical Reconditioning for the Royal Canadian Air Force. After the war, he taught Physical and Health Education at the University of Toronto and became Publicity Officer for the University of Toronto Athletic Association, as well as Field Supervisor for the Canadian Red Cross Swimming and Water Safety program. In 1950, he founded Chetwynd Films and formally left the university in 1952.

== Career ==
The first productions of Chetwynd Films' (a.k.a. Chetwynd Productions) were films on coaching, education, and the activities of the Red Cross. These were followed by children's shows for the Canadian Broadcasting Corporation. Beginning in 1947, he produced shows about each Grey Cup championship, as well as shows for the Canadian Football League teams and the CFL's annual Schenley Awards. Beginning in 1952, he produced shows about each Calgary Stampede.

Sports films would account for 30% of Chetwynd's work; the rest was made up by films about accident prevention, medicine and travel. Films were often for, or in co-production with, CTV, the CBC and the National Film Board of Canada, which distributed many of his films. Some of his films were dramatizations (e.g. The Anderson File, 1977); others featured the client—in 1969, hockey great Jean Béliveau paid Chetwynd to make The Jean Béliveau Story, a one-hour special which aired on CTV.

Chetwynd also directed films (Calgary Stampede : Banff Indian Days, 1957) and worked on films for other producers, e.g. he was one of the cinematographers on the 1963 Crawley Films production Repeat Performance.

Chetwynd's award-winning film Jamboree, about the 8th World Scout Jamboree in Niagara-on-the-Lake, was selected for "Significance" by the Canadian government and became one of six films shown at the Canadian Pavilion at Expo 58 in Brussels.

In 1972, Chetwynd succeeded his uncle as 8th Baronet Chetwynd, of Brocton Hall, Staffordshire. In 1977, his son Robin, who had been directing films for the company since the mid-1960s, took over as president of Chetwynd Films. He carried on making promotional films until he closed the company c. 1980.

== Personal life and death ==
Chetwynd was a member, director, president, chair and/or patron of the Empire Club of Canada, the Monarchist League of Canada, the Saint Lazarus Society, Grenville Christian College, the Barbados National Trust. name="legacy_41763553"/>

He died in Cobourg, Ontario in 2004, at age 94,

== Honours ==
- Victory Medal (1945)
- Canadian Volunteer Service Medal (1945)
- Queen Elizabeth II Silver Jubilee Medal (1977)
- Order of Barbados Silver Crown of Merit (1984)
- Freedom of the City of London (1989)
- Queen Elizabeth II Golden Jubilee Medal (2003)
- Knight Commander, Military and Hospitaller Order of Saint Lazarus of Jerusalem
- Society of Motion Picture and Television Engineers, Life Member

== Filmography (partial) ==
Below is a sampling of the films produced by Arthur Chetwynd. Records of approximately 300 can be found at CESIF, Concordia University's Canadian Educational, Sponsored and Industrial Film Project. Records of another 1,300 are in the collection of the Canadian Government.

- Jamboree, for Eaton's 1955
- No Time to Spare (Pas de temps à perdre), for Les Compagnies d'assurance-vie du Canada 1955
- Kinai Chieftainship, for Calgary Brewing and Malting Co., dir. Robert Barclay 1957
- Re-Creation of Art, for the Spanish Consul and Francisco Franco National Foundation, dir. Eric Hagen 1958
- Castle of Learning, for the Spanish Consul and CBC, dir. Eric Hagen 1958
- Football Fever, for the Canadian Broadcasting Corporation, dir. Robert Barclay 1958
- Pursuit of Wisdom, for the University of Toronto, dir. John Rooke 1959
- This is Husky, for Husky Oil, dir. Robert Brooks 1959
- Scotch Cup 1961, for the Scotch Whisky Association, dir. Ross McConnell 1961
- A Look Behind the Big B.A., for British American Oil Company of Canada 1962
- Land of the Blue Tartan, Canadian National Railway 1963
- The Little Grey Cup Game, for Molson Brewery 1963
- Calgary Stampede 1964, for Calgary Exhibition and Stampede, dir. Arthur Chetwynd, 1964
- Barbados: As You Like It, for Barbados Tourism Authority 1964
- Canadian Schenley Football Awards 1964, for Canadian Schenley Distilleries, dir. Ross McConnell 1964
- Some Are Sunfishers, for Molson Brewery, dir. Robert Barclay 1964
- Marine Holiday West Coast Style, for Molson Brewery, dir. Robert Brooks 1965
- Miss Canada Pageant, for Miss Canada, dir. Robin Chetwynd 1965
- Putting on a Front, for General Motors of Canada, dir. Peter Kelly 1965
- University of Windsor : A Place to Live and Learn, for the University of Windsor, dir. Joy Gavill 1966
- Du Maurier International Slalom 1966, for Imperial Tobacco Canada, dir. Robin Chetwynd 1966
- Litton Systems, for Litton Industries, dir. Karl Konnery 1967
- Five Courses for Horses, for the Ontario Jockey Club, dir. Karl Konnery 1967
- The Ileostomist, for the Ileostomy Association of Toronto, dir. Karl Konnery 1968
- Safety Prevents Sorrow, for the Industrial Accident Prevention Association 1969
- Every Square Inch, for the Department of Energy, Mines and Resources, dir. Ross McConnell 1969
- Our Thing, for Labatt Breweries, dir. Robin Chetwynd 1969
- Fashion Council Puppet Show, for Dylex Stores 1969
- Manitoba Festival Country, for the Manitoba Department of Tourism, 1970
- Quarterback, for the Canadian Football League, dir. Robin Chetwynd 1970
- The Money Go Round, for the Canadian Life Insurance Officers Association, dir. Leo Brouse 1970
- Shell Ski Jump 70 Meter, for CTV, dir. Robin Chetwynd 1975
- Motorsport Canada 1975, for Imperial Tobacco Canada, dir. Robin Chetwynd 1975

== Awards ==
- Calgary Stampede, Honourable Mention, 5th Canadian Film Awards 1953
- No Time to Spare, Special Mention, 7th Canadian Film Awards, 1955
- Jamboree, Special Mention, 8th Canadian Film Awards, 1956
- Grey Cup Festival '58, Best Film, Travel and Recreation, 11th Canadian Film Awards, 1959
- Man of Kintail, Best Film, TV Information (tied), 12th Canadian Film Awards, 1960
- Grey Cup Festival '60, Best Film, Travel and Recreation (Recreation), 13th Canadian Film Awards, 1961
- Epidural Anaesthesia for Vaginal Delivery in Obstetrics, Best Film, Training and Instruction, 13th Canadian Film Awards, 1961
- Grey Cup Festival '62, Best Film, Travel and Recreation (Recreation), 15th Canadian Film Awards, 1963
- Stanley Cup Finals 1963, Best Film, Travel and Recreation (Recreation), 16th Canadian Film Awards, 1964
- Some Are Sunfishers, Best Film, General Information (tied), 17th Canadian Film Awards, 1965
- Light for the Mind , Best Film, Public Relations, 18th Canadian Film Awards, 1966
- Driver Training: Life Is Worth the Living, Best Film, Sales Promotion, 20th Canadian Film Awards, 1968
- It Starts at the Top, Best Film, Training and Instruction, 23rd Canadian Film Awards, 1971
