= 9th Canadian Film Awards =

Canadian film awards ceremony

- Date: June 15, 1957
- Location: King Edward Hotel, Toronto, Ontario
- Hosted by: Leonard Brockington

The 9th Canadian Film Awards were held on June 15, 1957 to honour achievements in Canadian film. The ceremony was hosted by Leonard Brockington, the founding Chairman of the Canadian Broadcasting Corporation.

For some time, members of the filmmaking community had been dissatisfied with the administration and structure of the awards. While its management had taken steps to resolve some of the issues, the poor technical quality of the ceremony itself led to media criticism which, many felt, was harming the industry. It was therefore decided that no awards would be presented in the traditional film categories; instead, two amateur awards were presented, and special awards were given to individuals and organizations who had been chosen through a nomination process.

== Winners ==
- John Grierson — "in recognition of his unique contribution to Canada's filmmaking art and industry".
- Yorkton Film Council — "in recognition of its distinguished international film festival, which demonstrates the contribution of the film council movement in Canada".
- Associated Screen Studios — "for its initiative in developing a program of training young personnel to meet the demands of Canada's growing film industry".
- Crawley Films — "in recognition of the company's distinguished production program in the field of educational films".
- Reverend Anson C. Moorehouse, United Church of Canada — "for his pioneering in the inspirational aspects of Canadian filmmaking".
- Frank Radford Crawley and Judith Crawley — "for their unique contribution to Canada's filmmaking art and industry".
- Lew Parry — "for his distinguished leadership in the development of a Canadian film industry".
- Roy Tash — "for more than a quarter century of photographing and editing Canadian newsreels and the only sustained project in theatrical filmmaking in Canada".
- Don Mulholland — "for his notable encouragement of creative Canadian film production".
- Harold P. Brown, E. Fred Holliday and James R. Pollock — "for their pioneering work and their continued devotion to the development of Canadian films in education".
- Amateur: Prelude to Spring — John W. Ruddell director

Honourable Mention: The Sugar Maple, Helen Webb-Smith director
