= Michael Ibrahim =

American conductor

Michael Ibrahim is an American conductor and educator. He is the founder and music director of the National Arab Orchestra (NAO), based in Michigan.

== Career ==
In 2009, Ibrahim founded the National Arab Orchestra, a professional ensemble dedicated to performing and preserving Arab music traditions. Under his direction, the orchestra has performed in cities across the United States and the Arab world, including Michigan, Texas, Doha, Sharjah, and Saudi Arabia.

Ibrahim and the orchestra have been featured in coverage by several independent media outlets, including:

- BBC Arabic – televised segment
- Al Jazeera – article on Arab music and cultural preservation
- Voice of America – feature on outreach and identity
- Saudi Aramco World – article on Arab music in diaspora
- Michigan Public – segment on music and cultural understanding

== Education ==
Ibrahim studied both Western classical and Arab musical traditions. He holds a Bachelor of Music degree from Eastern Michigan University and a Master of Music in conducting from Wayne State University.

== Recognition ==
In 2022, Ibrahim was awarded a Kresge Artist Fellowship in Music Composition.

== Performances and Outreach ==
The National Arab Orchestra, under Ibrahim’s direction, has collaborated with regional symphony orchestras and participated in cultural programming in cities including Flint, Doha, Sharjah, and Riyadh. A noted performance took place at the FIM Capitol Theatre in Flint, Michigan.

Ibrahim has led educational workshops and lectures focused on Arab music fundamentals, including the maqam system. His outreach has included programs conducted with schools and community organizations introducing students to Arab musical structures and oral traditions.
