= Lonely Boy (film) =

- VHS cover
- Directed by: Wolf Koenig; Roman Kroitor
- Produced by: Roman Kroitor; Tom Daly (exec.)
- Starring: Paul Anka
- Narrated by: Strowan Robertson; Jacques Giraldeau (French)
- Edited by: John Spotton; Guy L. Coté; Kathleen Shannon (sound)
- Production company: National Film Board of Canada
- Distributed by: National Film Board of Canada
- Release date: May 25, 1962 (Ann Arbor Film Festival)
- Running time: 27 minutes
- Country: Canada
- Language: English

Lonely Boy is a 1962 Canadian cinéma vérité documentary about the former teen singer Paul Anka. The film takes its name from Anka's hit song, "Lonely Boy", which he performs to screaming fans in the film. This short documentary makes use of hand-held cameras to record intimate backstage moments. It was produced by the National Film Board of Canada and directed by Roman Kroitor and Wolf Koenig.

== Influence ==
Lonely Boy was a substantial influence on the Peter Watkins film Privilege. Watkins had studied it in preparation for filming and his film deals with the phenomenal popularity of a pop singer and its abuse for political motives. One scene showing the central character, Steven Shorter, at a table with a venue owner is virtually a one-to-one reproduction of a scene in Lonely Boy, even using the same name (Uncle Julie) for the like-mannered venue owner. The cinéma verité style of Lonely Boy was also adopted, and one DVD release of Privilege included Lonely Boy as well as an excerpt of an essay on that film as extra features. The film's importance in the evolution of documentary film making was explored in the film Cinéma Vérité: Defining the Moment.

== Awards ==
- Festival dei Popoli, Florence, Italy: Gold Medal, 1960
- International Short Film Festival Oberhausen, Oberhausen, Germany: First Prize, Documentary, 1963
- 15th Canadian Film Awards, Montreal: Film of the Year, 1963
- 15th Canadian Film Awards, Montreal: Best Film, General Information, 1963
- Vancouver International Film Festival, Vancouver: First Prize, Documentary, 1962
- Ann Arbor Film Festival, Ann Arbor, Michigan: The Purchase Prize, 1963
- International Days of Short Films, Tours, France: Special Jury Prize, 1962
- Edinburgh International Film Festival, Edinburgh, Scotland: Honorable Mention, 1962
- 1962 Cannes Film Festival, Cannes, France: Honorable Mention, Documentary Works, 1962
