= I Think of You Often =

1983 film

- Directed by: Scott Barrie
- Produced by: Scott Barrie
- Edited by: Paul Fox
- Production company: Afterimage
- Release date: 1983
- Running time: 10 minutes
- Country: Canada
- Language: English

I Think of You Often is a Canadian short documentary film, directed by Scott Barrie and released in 1983. The film blends archival footage of World War I with narrated excerpts from three letters written by a Canadian soldier to his girlfriend.

The film premiered at the 1983 Yorkton Film Festival, where Paul Fox won the award for Best Editing and Barrie was awarded a certificate of merit. It received a Genie Award nomination for Best Theatrical Short Film at the 6th Genie Awards in 1985.
