= Quickdraw Animation Society =

Canadian nonprofit animation organization

Quickdraw Animation Society (QAS) is a nonprofit organization dedicated to promoting and furthering the art of animation. The organization was founded in 1984 in Calgary, Alberta, Canada.

In 2004, the organization launched the Giant Incandescent Resonating Animation Festival (GIRAF) which is held annually in Calgary and showcases animated films from around the world.

== Notable members ==
- Richard Reeves
- Tank Standing Buffalo
- Wendy Tilby and Amanda Forbis
- Wayne Traut, director of Movements of the Body
