= The Living Stone =

1958 film

- Opening titles
- Directed by: John Feeney
- Written by: John Feeney
- Produced by: Tom Daly
- Narrated by: George Whalley
- Cinematography: Patrick Carey; Wally Gentleman; Colin Low
- Edited by: Stuart Baker; John Feeney
- Music by: Maurice Blackburn
- Distributed by: National Film Board of Canada
- Release date: 1958
- Running time: 32 minutes
- Country: Canada
- Languages: Inuktitut; English

The Living Stone is a 1958 Canadian short documentary film directed by John Feeney and produced by the National Film Board of Canada. It shows the inspiration behind Inuit sculpture, where the aim of the artist is to release the image he or she sees imprisoned in the stone. Among its numerous honours was a nomination, at the 31st Academy Awards, for Best Documentary Short Film.

The 32-minute film is included in the 2011 Inuit film anthology Unikkausivut: Sharing Our Stories, bringing together over 100 films by and about Canadian Inuit, distributed on DVD to Inuit communities across the Canadian North and available online.

== Awards ==
- 11th Canadian Film Awards, Toronto: Award of Merit, General Information, 1959
- Locarno Film Festival, Locarno, Switzerland: Diploma of Honour, 1959
- International Filmfestival Mannheim-Heidelberg, Mannheim: Special Commendation, 1959
- Robert J. Flaherty Film Awards, City College Institute of Film Techniques: Honourable Mention, 1959
- Winnipeg Film Council Annual Film Festival, Winnipeg: Best Canadian Film, Short Subject, 1959
- Festival of Tourist and Folklore Films, Brussels: CIDALC Medal of Honour, 1960
- American Film and Video Festival, New York: Blue Ribbon, Graphic Arts, Sculpture and Architecture, 1960
- Rapallo International Film Festival, Rapallo, Italy: Special Prize, Cup of the Minister of Tourism and Entertainment for Best Foreign Film, 1960
- Rapallo International Film Festival, Rapallo, Italy: Second Prize, Silver Cup of the Province of Genoa, 1960
- SODRE International Festival of Documentary and Experimental Films, Montevideo, Uruguay: Honourable Mention 1960
- International Festival of Films on People and Countries, La Spezia, Italy: Silver Cup for the Most Popular Film of the Festival, 1967
- International Festival of Films on People and Countries, La Spezia, Italy: Medal for Best Ethnological Film, 1967
- International Maritime and Exploration Film Festival, Toulon, France: Ergo Prize of the Presidency of the Republic, 1969
- 31st Academy Awards, Los Angeles: Nominee: Best Documentary Short Film, 1958
