= The Quest (1958 film) =

- Directed by: Stanley Jackson
- Written by: Leslie McFarlane
- Produced by: Nicholas Balla; Stanley Jackson
- Starring: Leo Ciceri; Dennis Stanway; Norman Ettlinger
- Cinematography: Reginald H. Morris
- Edited by: Robert Russell; Bernard Bordeleau (sound)
- Music by: Eldon Rathburn
- Production company: National Film Board of Canada
- Release date: 1958
- Running time: 38:13 minutes
- Country: Canada
- Language: English

The Quest is a 1958 Canadian short drama film, directed by Stanley Jackson for the National Film Board of Canada.

The film is a re-enactment of the critical year in the life of Dr. Frederick Banting, during which he discovered insulin. It dramatizes the odds against which he and his assistant, Charles Best, worked, the skepticism of other doctors at the University of Toronto, and the final victory which gave countless diabetics a new hope of health.

The Quest was one of three co-winners, alongside The Tall Country and Money Minters, of the Canadian Film Award for Best Theatrical Short Film at the 11th Canadian Film Awards in 1959. It also won the Diploma of Merit at the Film Concourse at HYPSA Health & Sports Exhibition in Bern.
