= Day After Day (film) =

1962 film by Clément Perron

- French: Jour après jour
- Directed by: Clément Perron
- Written by: Clément Perron
- Produced by: Fernand Dansereau; Victor Jobin; Hubert Aquin
- Narrated by: Anne Claire Poirier
- Cinematography: Guy Borremans
- Edited by: Anne Claire Poirier
- Music by: Maurice Blackburn
- Production company: National Film Board of Canada
- Release date: 1962
- Running time: 27 minutes and 30 seconds
- Country: Canada
- Language: French

Day After Day (French: Jour après jour) is a 1962 Canadian short documentary film, directed by Clément Perron for the National Film Board of Canada.

The film documents the routines of working-class life in a small paper mill town in Quebec where most of the 6,500 inhabitants derive their livelihood from one industry. Using experimental sound and film editing techniques, it illustrates how much the town's public life is defined by the repetitive rhythms of the machines in the mill.

== Awards ==
- 15th Canadian Film Awards, Montreal: Best Arts and Experimental Film, 1963
- 15th Canadian Film Awards, Montreal: Special Award for Black and White Cinematography to Guy Borremans, 1963
- Midwest Film Festival, University of Chicago: President’s Prize, 1963
- Canadian Cinematography Awards, Montreal: Best Black and White Photography, 1963
- Golden Gate International Film Festival, San Francisco: Silver Award, Films as Art, 1963
- Calvin Workshop Awards, New York: Notable Film Award, 1968
