= Richard Reeves (animator) =

Canadian animated filmmaker (born 1959)

Richard Roger Reeves (born September 21, 1959) is a Canadian animated filmmaker. He is known for his whimsical abstract animated films created using a drawn on film technique.

In many of his films, Reeves creates his soundtracks through graphical sound, drawing directly on the optical sound strip area of the film as well as the visual frames to create a sound painting.

== Biography ==
Richard R. Reeves was born in Weymouth, England and has been living in Canada since 1960. He attended Sault College of Applied Arts & Technology, majoring in printmaking.

His early artwork explored painting, printmaking, photography, and music which led him to combine artistic discipline's and animate directly onto the filmstrip as a long and narrow canvas as 'sound painting' or visual music. His début animation 'Linear Dreams' was produced by drawing both the sound and picture directly onto the film.

Reeves worked at Quickdraw Animation Society as Film Production Coordinator for 8 years. He also taught super 8 and 16mm filmmaking at the Gulf Islands Film and Television School for 10 years. He has mentored and provided workshops in Europe, South America and across Canada.

Richard explores abstract animation as a visual music by drawing both sound and picture onto film. He has collaborated with artists for live performances involving dancing human projection screens, 16mm violin, interactive animation installations, online animation jams and large outdoor projections. He continues exploring film as a space time art form.

== In the media ==
Reeves was the subject of the short documentary Instant Animation, which was directed by Ted Stenton and released in 2024.

== Filmography ==
- 'Story from the Stone'
  1991 / 1 min. / 16mm,
  inspired by pictographs at Writing on Stone Park, pastel on paper.
- 'Major ReBeouf's Lost and Found Film'
  1992 / 3 min. / 16mm,
  mythological story, created specially for “Return to Exceptional Pass”, Whyte Museum of the Canadian Rockies, Banff.
- 'Garbanzo'
  1993 / 2 min. / 16mm,
  abstract colors and forms to original jazz music, painted directly on to film.
- 'Zig Zag'
  1994 / 1 min. / 35mm,
  zig zag pictures dance to zig zag sounds, etched directly on to one piece of film.
- 'Linear Dreams'
  1997 / 7 min. 35mm,
  images from the minds eye, music from the minds ear, sound and picture drawn on film.
- 'Sea Song'
  1999 / 4 min. / 35mm,
  an animated look into the sparkling ocean at night, sound and picture drawn on film.
- 'CFMDC trailer'
  1999 / 30 sec. / 35mm,
  a trailer for the Canadian Filmmakers Distribution Centre made by
  drawing both sound and picture directly onto motion picture film.
- '1:1'
  2001 / 2.5 min. / 35mm,
  exploring the one-to-one relationship between sound and picture as visual music.
- 'O.I.A.F. Signal Film'
  2002 / 24sec. / 35mm,
  Live performance introducing Ottawa International Animation Festival,
  4 animators with 4 film projectors producing optical sound track to cameraless film at the National Arts Centre, Ottawa Canada.
- 'Element of Light'
  2004 / 4.5 min. / 35mm,
  inspired by the elements of nature.
- 'Aura'
  2006 / 2.5min./ 35mm,
  contemplation of aural and visual perceptions,
  commissioned work for the Liaison of Independent Filmmakers of Toronto.
- 'Yarwood Trail'
  2009 / 4 min. / 35mm,
  inspired by the artwork of Walter Yarwood, sound and picture drawn onto film.
  commissioned work for the Toronto Animated Image Society commemorating the Painters 11.
- ‘Once Upon a Mountain’
  2014 / 3min / 16mm,
  based on true story of mountain climbing in the Canadian Rockies. animated watercolour paintings.
- 'Twilight'
  2018 / 2 min. / 35mm, handmade optical sounds and drawing onto film.
  inspired by the two lights (twi-light) found inside of film projectors.
- 'TV'
  2018 / 2 min. / 35mm, handmade optical sounds and drawing onto film.
  transformational vibrations: Inspirational mark making as a visual representation of handmade optical sounds.
- 'Four Elements of Change'
  2019 / 5.5min. / 16mm cameraless and 16mm black+white hand processed film,
  Four short films inspired by theme of climate change created for 'Shifting Ground', group exhibition at Langham Cultural Centre, Kaslo BC, Canada.
- 'Wood and Metal Bars'
  2021 / 10 min./ 16mm cameraless.
  a meditative journey through colour, form and sound. Music video created for chamber music composer Frank Horvat, performed by percussionist Beverly Johnston.
- 'Hot Flashes'
  2022 / 16mm silent film / 1 min. / cameraless.
  a silent flicker film with pulsating frames of red, pink and orange.
- 'Intersextion'
  2022 / 4min. / 35mm, handmade optical sounds and drawing onto film.
  two abstract energies fall in love, unite as one then disappear into a vanishing point.
- 'Fusion'
  2024 / 3:18min. / 35mm, handmade optical sounds and drawing onto film.
  Investigating interplay between sound and picture as visual music.

== Collections ==
Collections of Film Prints :

- National Library and Archives of Canada, Ottawa.
- Academy of Motion Picture Arts and Science Film Archive, Hollywood, USA.
- National Film Board of Canada, Montreal.
- IOTA Centre for Visual Music, Los Angeles, USA.
- Canadian Filmmakers Distribution Centre.
- KurzFilmAgentur Hamburg e.V., Germany.
- Cinematheque Quebecois, Montreal, Canada.
- Newfoundland Filmmakers Coop, Canada.

== Awards ==
- 2025 - Best Animation Technique Award: Ottawa Int. Animation Festival, Canada.
- 2025 - Nominee Cristal Award: Annecy Int. Animation Festival, France.
- 2025 - Audience Award, Best Music: Paris Int. Animation Festival, France.
- 2025 - Jury Choice Award: Thomas Edison Film Festival, USA.
- 2025 - 3rd Prize: Punto y Raya World Festival of Abstract Art in Motion, Sofia Bulgaria.
- 2024 - Best Experimental Animation Award: 62nd Ann Arbor Film Festival, USA.
- 2023 - Jury Award, Best Sound : GIRAF 19, Calgary Canada.
- 2023 - 3rd Prize: Punto y Raya World Festival of Abstract Art in Motion, Lisbon Portugal.
- 2023 - Nominee Cristal Award: Annecy Int. Animation Festival, France.
- 2023 - Jury Choice Award: Thomas Edison Film Festival, USA.
- 2019 - Jury Stellar Award, Experimental Film: Black Maria Film Festival, USA.
- 2018 - Best Non Narrative Animation : GIRAF festival, Canada
- 2005 – Directors Choice Award : Black Maria Film Festival, USA.
- 2003 – Jury Citation Award : Black Maria Film Festival, USA.
- 2001 – Award of Merit : Oberhausen Short Film Festival, Germany.
- 2000 – Directors Choice Award : Black Maria Film Festival, USA.
- 1998 – Best Canadian Animated Film : Ottawa Int. Animation Festival, Canada.
- 1998 – Best Abstract Film : Zagreb Int. Animation Film Festival, Croatia.
- 1998 – Jury Award : Brisbane International Animation Festival, Australia.
- 1998 – Juror's Choice Award : Black Maria Film Festival, USA.
- 1998 – Best Sound Design: Ann Arbor Film Festival, USA.
- 1998 – Award of the Academy of Fine Art: University of Zagreb, Croatia.
- 1998 – Award of the Artiria Gallery: Zagreb, Croatia.
- 1998 – Award of Merit: San Francisco International film Festival, USA.
- 1998 – 2nd Prize Experimental Film: World Animation Celebration, USA.
- 1997 – Best Canadian Short Film: Atlantic Film Festival, Canada.
- 1997 – Best Experimental Film: Sea to Sky Film Festival, Canada.
- 1997 – Best Animated Film: Victoria Independent Film Festival.
- 1997 – Best Animated Film: Alberta Motion Picture Industry Awards, Canada.

== Sources ==
- The Animation Bible : Maureen Furniss : 2008 : ISBN 978-1-85669-550-3. pg.164-165, pg.176-179.https://www.amazon.com/dp/081099545X
- The Film Strip Tells All: (Animation World Network); Dr. William Moritz, Animation Historian and Cal Arts Experimental Animation Instructor, https://www.awn.com/mag/issue3.6/3.6pages/3.6moritzfilms.html
