= Anniversary (1963 film) =

- Opening titles
- Directed by: William Weintraub
- Written by: William Weintraub
- Produced by: William Weintraub; Nicholas Balla (exec.)
- Narrated by: Walter Pidgeon
- Edited by: Tony Lower; Marguerite Payette (sound)
- Music by: Norman Bigras
- Production company: National Film Board of Canada
- Distributed by: National Film Board of Canada
- Release date: 1963
- Running time: 19 minutes
- Country: Canada
- Language: English

Anniversary (Anniversaire) is a 1963 Canadian short documentary film produced by the National Film Board of Canada and directed by William Weintraub.

Created to mark the 60th anniversary of the release of the first Canadian narrative drama film, Hiawatha, the Messiah of the Ojibway (1903), the film presents an overview of the history of Canadian contributions to cinema, including archival footage of Canadian actors such as Mary Pickford, Marie Dressler, Mack Sennett, Norma Shearer, Fay Wray, Deanna Durbin, and Walter Huston. It was narrated by Walter Pidgeon.

The film won the Canadian Film Award for Best Theatrical Short Film at the 16th Canadian Film Awards in 1964.
