= The Tall Country =

- Directed by: Osmond Borradaile
- Written by: Keith Cutler
- Produced by: Lew Parry
- Narrated by: George McLean
- Cinematography: Osmond Borradaile
- Edited by: Shelah Reljic
- Music by: Ricky Hyslop
- Production company: Parry Films
- Distributed by: National Film Board of Canada
- Release date: 1958
- Running time: 24 minutes
- Country: Canada
- Language: English
- Budget: $30,000

The Tall Country is a Canadian short documentary film, directed by Osmond Borradaile and released in 1958. Commissioned by the Government of British Columbia to commemorate the provincial centennial, the film depicts various aspects of life and work in the province. It was narrated by Canadian Broadcasting Corporation announcer George McLean.

The film was one of three co-winners, alongside The Quest and Money Minters, of the Canadian Film Award for Best Theatrical Short Film at the 11th Canadian Film Awards in 1959.
