= Movements of the Body =

- Directed by: Wayne Traudt
- Produced by: Wayne Traudt
- Animation by: Wayne Traudt
- Production company: Quickdraw Animation Society
- Distributed by: National Film Board of Canada
- Country: Canada

Movements of the Body is a Canadian animated film series created by Wayne Traudt, consisting of the films 1st Movement: The Gesture (1994), 2nd Movement: The Drawing (1996) and 3rd Movement: The Coloring (1997). Produced for the Calgary-based Quickdraw Animation Society, the three films each depict the motion of a body through various stages of the figure drawing process.

1st Movement: The Gesture premiered at the 1994 Cinanima festival, where it won the award for best film, and was subsequently screened in the International Critics' Week at the 1995 Cannes Film Festival. It was a Genie Award nominee for Best Theatrical Short Film at the 16th Genie Awards. and won the Rosie Award for Best Animation at the 1995 Alberta Film and Television Awards and the award for Best Animation at the 1995 Yorkton Film Festival.
