= Footsteps (1982 film) =

- Directed by: Scott Barrie
- Produced by: Scott Barrie
- Edited by: Scott Barrie
- Production company: Conestoga College
- Release date: 1982
- Country: Canada
- Language: English

Footsteps is a Canadian drama short film, directed by Scott Barrie and commercially released in 1982. The film centres on the competitors at a trailbiking event.

Barrie made the film in 1978 as his student project in film studies at Conestoga College, and won the award for best student editing at the 1979 Canadian Cinema Editors awards. However, it did not receive commercial distribution until 1982, when it was one of the nine inaugural winners of the Canadian Independent Short Films Showcase, a new Canada Council competition for emerging filmmakers whose prize included having the films blown up to 35 mm format for commercial exhibition, and distributed as the opening films at feature film screenings that summer. It was selected to accompany the feature film Grease 2.

The film was a Genie Award nominee for Best Theatrical Short Film at the 4th Genie Awards in 1983.
