= Royal River (film) =

- Directed by: Gordon Sparling; Roger Blais
- Produced by: Grant McLean; Nicholas Balla (exec.)
- Narrated by: Geoffrey Hogwood
- Production company: National Film Board of Canada
- Release date: 1959
- Running time: 31 minutes
- Country: Canada
- Language: English

Royal River is a 1959 Canadian documentary film directed by Gordon Sparling and Roger Blais for the National Film Board of Canada.

Produced to commemorate the official opening of the St. Lawrence Seaway, the film documents the tour of Queen Elizabeth II and Prince Philip, Duke of Edinburgh aboard the HMY Britannia. It was compiled almost entirely from newsreel footage, including of the royal couple's meetings with John Diefenbaker, Richard Nixon, Dwight Eisenhower and Nelson Rockefeller.

At the 12th Canadian Film Awards in 1960, Royal River won Best Theatrical Short Film.
