= Scott Barrie (filmmaker) =

Canadian film and television director

Scott Barrie is a Canadian film and television director, most noted as a three-time Genie Award nominee for his short films.

Originally from Brantford, Ontario, he graduated from Conestoga College in 1978. In his graduating year, he won the Norman McLaren Award from the Canadian Student Film Festival for his student film Gracie.

Barrie directed episodes of the television series The Edison Twins, and was also a writer for Degrassi High, The Campbells, My Secret Identity, and Mysterious Island.

== Awards ==
Award	Year	Category	Work	Result	Ref(s)
Canadian Student Film Festival	1978	Norman McLaren Award	Gracie	Won	
Genie Awards	1983	Best Theatrical Short Film	Footsteps	Nominated	
Genie Awards	1985	Best Theatrical Short Film	I Think of You Often	Nominated	
Genie Awards	1991	Best Short Documentary	In Search of the Edge	Nominated	
Yorkton Film Festival	1983	Certificate of Merit	I Think of You Often	Won	
