= The Rise and Fall of English Montreal =

Film about English exodus from Montreal

- Directed by: William Weintraub
- Written by: William Weintraub
- Produced by: Bill Brind
- Narrated by: Vlasta Vrána
- Cinematography: Jacques Avoine; Lynda Pelley; Barry Perles
- Edited by: Jeremiah Hayes
- Music by: Eldon Rathburn
- Distributed by: National Film Board of Canada
- Release date: 1993
- Running time: 51 minutes
- Country: Canada
- Language: English

The Rise and Fall of English Montreal is a 1993 Canadian documentary film directed by William Weintraub and produced by the National Film Board of Canada in Montreal.

The film deals with the exodus of English-speaking Quebecers that began in the 1960s and was accelerated by the 1976 Quebec general election.

== Overview ==
The film includes interviews with English-speaking professionals and students who are preparing to leave Montreal, joining an exodus of 300,000 Anglophones that left the province in the last two decades.

This exodus is reflected in over 100 English-speaking schools that have closed in recent years. The students at McGill University and Concordia University cite better work opportunities outside of the province as a reason for leaving. Frequently, the lack of a Francophone background is cited as an obstacle for Anglophones, even for those who are bilingual.

Weintraub also looks at the role that the Office québécois de la langue française plays in making Anglophone businesses comply with language laws, calling for the use of French language signage instead of English.

The film juxtaposes a worried minority's present position with their past in Montreal, where English-speakers once outnumbered Francophones, where the mayor was English-speaking and it was difficult to be served in French in downtown department stores.

The film also addresses key moments of significance to the Anglo community in Montreal, such as the demolition of the Van Horne Mansion in 1973. Weintraub also displays the significant role that Anglo business has played in cultivating Montreal's overseas image as a "North American Paris."

As the Anglo youth leave Montreal and the elderly stay behind, the film poses questions about the future and sustainability of the Anglo community in Montreal and the province itself.

== See also ==
- Legal dispute over Quebec's language policy
- Quebec diaspora
