= 12th Canadian Film Awards =

Award to honour achievements in Canadian film

- Date: June 3, 1960
- Location: King Edward Hotel, Toronto, Ontario
- Hosted by: Albert Trueman

The 12th Canadian Film Awards were held on June 3, 1960, to honour achievements in Canadian film.

This year saw 115 films entered for consideration and the judging panel consisted of 55 people in Toronto, Ottawa and Montreal. The ceremony took the form of an informal luncheon hosted by Albert Trueman, Director of the Canada Council.

== Winners ==
- Film of the Year: Not awarded
- Feature Film: No entries submitted
- Theatrical Short: Royal River — National Film Board of Canada, Grant McLean producer, Gordon Sparling and Roger Blais directors
- Arts and Experimental: Les Bateaux de neige — Studio 7, Jacques Giraldeau director
- TV Information: Bad Medicine — Crawley Films, Harry Horner and F. R. Crawley producers, Don Haldane director

Man of Kintail — Chetwynd Films, Arthur Chetwynd producer

- Films for Children: Tales of the Riverbank — Riverbank Productions, Paul Sutherland director

The Chairmaker and the Boys — National Film Board of Canada, Tim Wilson producer

- Travel and Recreation: Pressure Golf — Crawley Films, F. R. Crawley and Peter Cook producers, Peter Cook director
- General Information: A Is for Architecture — National Film Board of Canada, Tom Daly and Colin Low producers, Gerald Budner and Robert Verrall directors
- Public Relations: It's the People That Count — Crawley Films, F. R. Crawley producer
- Sales Promotion: Hosiery Facts and Fashions — Omega Productions, Richard J. Jarvis producer
- Training and Instruction: An Introduction to Jet Engines — National Film Board of Canada, Frank Spiller producer, René Jodoin director

Radiation — National Film Board of Canada, Hugh O'Connor producer and director

- Filmed Commercial: Duet — Robert Lawrence Productions, John Ross producer
- Amateur: Paperchase — University of British Columbia, Werner Aellen director
- Special Awards:

- Arthur Chetwynd, Chetwynd Films — "for dedicated service in the interest of Canadian filmmakers as an executive officer of the Association of Motion Picture Producers and Laboratories of Canada".
- Joseph Morin, Ciné-Photographic Branch, Government of Quebec — "for over forty years of service to Canadian filmmaking in the fields of production, distribution and exhibition".
