= Eskimo Artist: Kenojuak =

1964 film

- Opening titles
- Directed by: John Feeney
- Written by: John Feeney
- Produced by: Tom Daly
- Cinematography: François Séguillon
- Edited by: John Feeney
- Distributed by: National Film Board of Canada
- Release date: 1964
- Running time: 19 minutes
- Country: Canada
- Languages: English; Inuktitut

Eskimo Artist: Kenojuak is a 1964 Canadian short documentary film about Inuk artist Kenojuak Ashevak, directed by John Feeney and produced by the National Film Board of Canada (NFB).

It won the BAFTA Award for Best Short Film in 1964 and, in 1965, was nominated for the Academy Award for Best Documentary Short Film.

The 19-minute film shows how the drawings of Inuk artist Kenojuak Ashevak are transferred to stone and printed before being sold to museums and collectors. Ashevak was the first woman involved with the printmaking cooperative in Cape Dorset.

The NFB notes: "... this is an archival film that makes use of the word “Eskimo,” an outdated and offensive term. While the origin of the word is a matter of some contention, it is no longer used in Canada. The term was formally rejected by the Inuit Circumpolar Council in 1980 and has subsequently not been in use at the NFB."

Eskimo Artist: Kenojuak found new life again in 1992, when filmmakers Colin Low and Tony Ianzelo combined archival and contemporary footage of Kenojuak in Momentum, Canada's IMAX HD film for Expo '92.

== Awards ==
- 18th British Academy Film Awards, London: BAFTA Award for Best Short Film, 1964
- Cork International Film Festival, Cork, Ireland: Statuette of St. Finbarr - First Prize, Art Films, 1964
- Festival of Tourist and Folklore Films, Brussels: Gold Medal - First Prize, 1965
- Melbourne International Film Festival, Melbourne: Silver Boomerang - Second Prize, 1965
- International Exhibition of Scientific Film, Buenos Aires: Second Prize, Category C, 1965
- Columbus International Film & Animation Festival, Columbus, Ohio: Chris Award, Education & Information, 1966
- American Film and Video Festival, New York: First Prize, Graphic Arts, Sculpture and Architecture, 1967
- Panama International Film Festival, Panama City, Panama: Grand Prize for Best Documentary, 1966
- Thessaloniki International Film Festival, Thessaloniki, Greece: First Prize, Foreign Film, 1967
- Festival of Cultural Films, La Felguera, Spain: Silver Plaque, 1967
- Philadelphia International Festival of Short Films, Philadelphia: Award of Exceptional Merit, 1971
- FIBA International Festival of Buenos Aires, Buenos Aires: Diploma of Honor, 1968
- Tokyo International Film Festival, Tokyo, Japan: Certificate of Merit, 1966
- Vancouver International Film Festival, Vancouver: Certificate of Merit, 1964
- Venice Film Festival, Venice, Italy: Special Mention, 1964
- 37th Academy Awards, Los Angeles: Nominee: Best Documentary Short Subject, 1965
