= Lew Parry =

Canadian film producer

Llewellyn Maddock Parry (October 5, 1905 - May 13, 1993) was a Canadian film producer, commonly credited as the "father" of the film industry in British Columbia. He was a two-time Canadian Film Award winner, receiving a special award at the 9th Canadian Film Awards in 1957 "for his distinguished leadership in the development of a Canadian film industry", and winning a competitive award at the 11th Canadian Film Awards in 1959 as producer of The Tall Country, that year's winner for Best Theatrical Short Film.

Born and raised in Lethbridge, Alberta to immigrant parents from the United Kingdom, Parry worked as a tinsmith and a sign designer, while pursuing interests in theatre as a hobby, in the 1920s and 1930s. He first entered the film industry during World War II when a rapid staffing expansion at his then-employer, Neon Products of Western Canada, necessitated the production of industrial training films. In 1944 he left Neon Products to join the fledgling Vancouver Motion Pictures as a production manager, but declined to transfer to Toronto when that company moved; instead, he purchased VMP's now-vacant studio and established his first production company, Trans-Canada Films. In 1946 he produced his first general-interest documentary film, Vancouver Diamond Jubilee, for the municipal anniversary of Vancouver. In 1948 he sold Trans-Canada Films to new owners who transformed it into a film processing company, and purchased North American Productions, a company which he renamed Lew Parry Film Productions. The company made a few theatrical films, most notably the documentaries Prelude to Kitimat and The Tall Country, but specialized primarily in instructional and informational documentary films for government and corporate clients; however, nearly all of the next generation of British Columbia filmmakers, who were able to start making feature films, got their first experience in the film industry working for Parry Productions.

Parry was also one of the founders of the British Columbia Motion Picture Association and Telefilm Canada.

In his final years before retiring from the film industry, Parry ran the internal film unit at BC Hydro.
