= Bound for Glory (1975 film) =

1975 film

- French: Partis pour la gloire
- Directed by: Clément Perron
- Written by: Clément Perron
- Produced by: Marc Beaudet
- Starring: Serge L'Italien; Rachel Cailhier; Jacques Thisdale; André Melançon
- Cinematography: Georges Dufaux
- Edited by: Pierre Lemelin
- Music by: François Dompierre
- Production company: National Film Board of Canada
- Release date: October 15, 1975
- Running time: 102 minutes
- Country: Canada
- Language: French

Bound for Glory (French: Partis pour la gloire) is a Canadian drama film, directed by Clément Perron and released in 1975.

Set against the backdrop of the 1942 Canadian conscription plebiscite, the film is set in a small town in the Beauce region of Quebec where resistance to the war is high and many men have fled into the woods to escape being conscripted. The film's cast includes Serge L'Italien, Rachel Cailhier, Jacques Thisdale, André Melançon, Yolande Roy, Jean-Marie Lemieux, Louise Ladouceur and Jean-Pierre Masson.

Melançon won the Canadian Film Award for Best Actor at the 27th Canadian Film Awards.
