= The Man Who Skied Down Everest =

1975 film

- Theatrical release poster
- Directed by: F. R. Crawley; Bruce Nyznik
- Written by: Judith Crawley
- Produced by: F. R. Crawley; James Hager; Dale Hartleben
- Starring: Yuichiro Miura
- Narrated by: Douglas Rain
- Cinematography: Mitsuji Kanau
- Edited by: Bob Cooper; Millie Moore
- Music by: Larry Crosley; Nexus
- Production companies: Crawley Films; Ishihara International Productions
- Distributed by: Specialty Films (US)
- Release date: September 19, 1975
- Running time: 84 minutes
- Countries: Canada; Japan; United States
- Language: English
- Budget: C$410,000

The Man Who Skied Down Everest is a Canadian documentary about Yuichiro Miura, a Japanese alpinist who skied down Mount Everest in 1970. It follows a Japanese expedition through the planning, preparation, and execution of a partial ascent and high-speed descent of Everest. The film was produced by Crawley Films' "Budge" Crawley and directed by Crawley and Bruce Nyznik.

Miura skied 2,000 m (6,600 ft) in two minutes and 20 seconds and fell 400 m (1,320 ft) down the steep Lhotse face from the Yellow Band just below the South Col. He used a large parachute to slow his descent. He came to a full stop just 76 m (250 ft) from the edge of a bergschrund, a large, deep crevasse where the flow ice shears away from stable ice on the rock face and begins to move downwards as a glacier.

The ski descent was the objective of The Japanese Everest Skiing Expedition 1970. Six Sherpa porters were killed in a single accident by a collapse of a section of the Khumbu Glacier along the main route to the base of the mountain, as well as a Japanese member who died of a heart attack.

Crawley Films won the Academy Award for Best Documentary Feature for this picture. The Academy Film Archive preserved The Man Who Skied Down Everest in 2010.

== See also ==
- 1970 Mount Everest disaster
