= 16th Canadian Film Awards =

1964 film awards

- Date: May 8, 1964
- Location: Royal York Hotel, Toronto
- Hosted by: Wayne and Shuster

Highlights
- Film of the Year: Pour la suite du monde
- Best Feature Film: À tout prendre

The 16th Canadian Film Awards were held on May 8, 1964, to honour achievements in Canadian film.

This year saw 148 films entered, including five features, and the fact that a French-language film won Film of the Year was a tremendous boost for Francophone film production. The awards' international reputation was also cemented, as the gala was attended by 500 people from all over North America, including a large number of international journalists.

The ceremony was moved back to Toronto; its hosts were comedians Johnny Wayne and Frank Shuster.

== Films ==
- Film of the Year: Pour la suite du monde — National Film Board of Canada, Fernand Dansereau producer, Pierre Perrault and Michel Brault directors
- Feature Film: À tout prendre (aka All Things Considered aka Take it All) — Les Films Cassiopée, Orion Films, Claude Jutra and Robert Hershorn producers, Claude Jutra director
- Theatrical Short: Anniversary — National Film Board of Canada, William Weintraub producer and director
- Arts and Experimental: Not awarded
- TV Information: Cardiac Team — Canadian Broadcasting Corporation, Doug Gillingham producer
- TV Entertainment: The Education of Phyllistine — Canadian Broadcasting Corporation, Philip Keatley producer and director
- Films for Children: The Origins of Weather — National Film Board of Canada, Tom Daly producer, Joe Koenig director
- Travel and Recreation: Rogers Pass — Pageant Productions, Peter J. Elkington producer and director

Stanley Cup Finals 1963 — Chetwynd Films, Arthur Chetwynd producer

- General Information: Fields of Sacrifice — National Film Board of Canada, Donald Brittain producer and director
- Public Relations: Brampton Builds a Car — Crawley Films, James Turpie producer and director
- Sales Promotion: Land on the Move — Westminster Films, Don Haldane producer and director
- Training and Instruction: Mrs. Reynolds Needs a Nurse — Robert Anderson Associates, Robert Anderson producer and director
- Filmed Commercial, Company or Product: Kiln — Williams Drege & Hill, Colin Y. Smith director

Molson Export, Wheels — Film Assistance Productions, A. J. Chesterman producer

- Filmed Commercial, Public Service: What Shall I Be? — Canadian Broadcasting Corporation, Warren Collins producer
- Amateur: House of Toys — London Film Society, Donald Carter director

Certificate of Merit: The Day of the Beginning — John P. FitzGerald director
Certificate of Merit: Fête de nuit — Claude Savard director
Certificate of Merit: Perspective — Derek A. Davy director
Certificate of Merit: Summer's Come to the City — Howard F. Pole director

== Non-Feature Craft Awards ==
- Black and White Cinematography: John Spotton, The Hutterites (NFB)
- Colour Cinematography: Stan Brede, Brampton Builds a Car (Crawley Films)

== Special Award ==
- Pour la suite du monde, National Film Board of Canada, Pierre Perrault and Michel Brault — "in recognition of its visual qualities, perceptions and artistry, which involve the audience in a revival of earlier traditions at Île-aux-Coudres".
