= 13th Canadian Film Awards =

Canadian film awards ceremony

- Date: May 13, 1961
- Location: King Edward Hotel, Toronto, Ontario
- Hosted by: J. Alphonse Ouimet
- Most awards: Universe

The 13th Canadian Film Awards were held on May 13, 1961 to honour achievements in Canadian film.

By now, the young medium of television had dramatically changed the nature of filmmaking in Canada, to the point where the event's host, Canadian Broadcasting Corporation president J. Alphonse Ouimet, felt the need to assure the audience that videotape would not surpass film in importance to the CBC. Television, now occupying filmmakers' attention, brought about a consistent rise in revenue. Its newfound significance prompted the introduction of new CFA awards for TV, with the CBC clinching all the eligible awards.

== Winners ==
=== Films ===
- Film of the Year: Universe — National Film Board of Canada, Tom Daly producer. Colin Low and Roman Kroitor directors
- Feature Film: No entries submitted
- Theatrical Short: Universe — National Film Board of Canada, Tom Daly producer, Colin Low and Roman Kroitor directors
- Arts and Experimental: Lines Vertical — National Film Board of Canada, Norman McLaren producer, Norman McLaren and Evelyn Lambart directors
- TV Information: Armagh — Canadian Broadcasting Corporation, Phillip Hersch director
- TV Entertainment: Field Trip — Canadian Broadcasting Corporation, Frank Goodship producer
- Films for Children: Life in the Woodlot — National Film Board of Canada, Hugh O'Connor producer, Dalton Muir director
- Travel and Recreation: Waters of the Whiteshell — Crawley Films, Peter Cock producer and director

Grey Cup Festival '60 — Chetwynd Films, Arthur Chetwynd producer and director

- General Information: Marsh Harvest — Wildlife Productions, W. H. Carrick producer and director
- Public Relations: Take Four Giant Steps — Pageant Productions, Roy Minter director
- Sales Promotion: Hors-d'oeuvre — National Film Board of Canada, Colin Low and Victor Jobin producers, Gerald Potterton, Robert Verrall, Arthur Lipsett, Derek Lamb, Kaj Pindal and Jeff Hale directors
- Training and Instruction: Epidural Anaesthesia for Vaginal Delivery in Obstetrics — Chetwynd Films, Arthur Chetwynd producer, R.A. Gordon director
- Filmed Commercial, Company or Product: Not awarded
- Filmed Commercial, Public Service: Mad Driver — Canadian Broadcasting Corporation
- Amateur: Ringers Required — Anthony Collins producer and director

Certificate of Merit: Be Prepared — George Gingras director
Certificate of Merit: Floral Capers — John W. Ruddell director
Certificate of Merit: Italian Marble — Fred W. Borgman director
Certificate of Merit: Wake of the Bluenose — Ken Cucksey director

- Special Award:

Dr. Albert Trueman, Director Canada Council — "for his contribution to the art of filmmaking and the distribution of Canadian films"
