= William Weintraub =

Canadian documentarian/filmmaker, journalist and author (1926 – 2017)

- Born: February 19, 1926; Montreal, Quebec
- Died: November 6, 2017 (aged 91); Montreal, Quebec
- Education: McGill University (1947)
- Occupations: writer, producer, director, journalist, novelist
- Awards: Order of Canada see below for professional awards

William Weintraub OC (February 19, 1926 – November 6, 2017) was a Canadian documentarian/filmmaker, journalist and author, best known for his long career with the National Film Board of Canada (NFB).

== Early life ==
Weintraub was born in Montreal, to Louis Weintraub and Mina Blumer Weintraub, and grew up in the blue-collar neighbourhood of Verdun. His father had been a stock broker; he lost everything in the Wall Street Crash of 1929 and worked as the manager of a corner store. William studied English Literature and political science at McGill University, where he had worked on the McGill Daily. In 1947, he took the job of a ski reporter at The Montreal Gazette, from which he was fired for trying to unionize. His time at the Gazette was the basis for his 1961 novel Why Rock the Boat?, which director John Howe turned into a film in 1974.

== Career ==
From 1951 to 1955, Weintraub worked as a copy editor at Weekend Picture Magazine. He became interested in the new medium of television and, in 1955, after taking a two-week course in script-writing, started freelancing as a writer with the CBC and the NFB.

In 1965, he joined the NFB staff and stayed until his retirement in 1987, writing, producing and/or directing 115 documentaries and short films. Productions ranged from Canada: Beef Cattle to historical documentaries to a portrait of Canadian writer Margaret Laurence. His final documentary The Rise and Fall of English Montreal dealt with the second large Quebec diaspora that began in the 1960s and accelerated rapidly after the 1976 Quebec election. The National Post wrote that he said that Torontonians should express their gratitude to a major benefactor of the city and erect a very large heroic statue at the head of Bay Street of former Premier of Quebec René Lévesque.

From 1975 to 1976, Weintraub was the director, National Film Board studio in Nairobi, Kenya. He served on the international jury of the Kraków Film Festival and was on the board of the Quebec Council for the Diffusion of Cinema. He was a member of the Canadian delegation that visited China's film industry in 1977, a delegate to the UNESCO Conference on Film and Television, and was a recipient of a Canada Council Senior Arts Fellowship.

Weintraub published four books after his seventieth birthday, including City Unique (1996), an exploration of English Montreal in the 1940s and 1950s, which received the QSPELL Prize for Non-Fiction from the Quebec Writers' Federation Awards.

Among Weintraub's contemporaries and friends were Mordecai Richler, Mavis Gallant, Norman Levine and Brian Moore. His correspondence with these writers was the basis of his 2001 memoir Getting Started.

Weintraub's satirical 1979 novel The Underdogs provoked controversy by imagining a future socialist republic of Quebec, in which English-speakers were an oppressed minority, complete with a violent resistance movement. One planned stage version was cancelled before its premiere, but another version was later a hit at the Just For Laughs festival.

== Personal life ==
Weintraub's first marriage, to Bernice Grafstein ended in divorce. In 1967, he married Madga Landau, who had emigrated to Canada from Poland; they remained married until her death in 2012. Neither marriage produced children.

From an early age, Weintraub suffered from depression. He dealt with it with Psychoanalysis, Electroconvulsive therapy and, eventually, by abstaining from alcohol.

== Legacy ==
In 2003, Weintraub was invested as an Officer of the Order of Canada.

In 2018, McGill University established the William Weintraub Prize in memory of William and Magda. It is an annual cash award, given by the university's Quebec Studies Program to one undergraduate student exploring the politics and culture of Quebec and Montreal.

== Filmography ==
(All for the National Film Board of Canada)

- Carnival - documentary short, Julian Biggs 1955 - writer
- Road of Iron - documentary short, Walford Hewitson 1955 - writer
- New Hearts for Old - TV series episode, Jean Lenauer 1955 - writer
- Embassy - documentary short, Don Haldane 1956 - writer
- Is It a Woman’s World? - documentary short, Don Haldane 1956 - writer
- Stress - documentary short, Ian MacNeill 1956 - writer
- Canadians Abroad - documentary short, Don Haldane 1956 - writer
- Fighter Wing – documentary short, Don Haldane 1956 - writer
- Saskatchewan Traveller - documentary short, Don Haldane 1956 - writer
- Portrait of the Family - documentary short, Ronald Dick 1957 - writer
- The Invisible Keystone - documentary short, Ronald Dick 1957 - writer
- Four Centuries of Growing Pains - documentary short, Ronald Dick, Nicholas Balla 1957 - writer
- The Colonies Look Ahead - documentary short, Ronald Dick 1957 - writer
- Can It Hold Together? - documentary short, Ronald Dick 1957
- Crisis in Asia - documentary short, Ronald Dick 1957
- The Ghost That Talked - documentary short, Don Haldane 1957 - writer
- A Letter from Oxford - documentary short, Julian Biggs 1957
- Colonialism: Ogre or Angel? - documentary short, John Howe 1957
- Million Dollar Smile - TV series episode, David Boisseau 1957 - writer
- Storm Clouds Over the Colonies - documentary short, Ronald Dick 1957 - writer
- Ten Days That Shook the Commonwealth - documentary short, Ronald Dick 1957 - writer
- Poverty and Plenty - documentary short, John Howe 1957 - writer
- Road to Independence - documentary short, Ronald Dick 1957 - writer
- They Called It White Man’s Burden - documentary short, John Howe 1957 - writer
- Black and White in South Africa - documentary short, John Howe & Ronald Dick 1957 - writer
- First Novel - documentary short, Donald Wilder 1958 - writer
- School for the Stage - documentary short, Julian Biggs 1958 - writer
- Canada: World Citizen - documentary short, Julian Biggs 1959 - writer
- Correlieu - documentary short, Jean Palardy 1959 - writer
- In the Beginning a Wilderness of Air - documentary short, Richard Gilbert 1959 - writer
- Double Heritage - documentary short, Richard Gilbert 1959 - writer
- The Golden Age - documentary short, Richard Gilbert 1959 - writer
- Sunshine and Eclipse (1927-1934) - documentary short 1960 - writer and producer
- The Good, Bright Days (1919-1927) - documentary short 1960 - writer and producer
- Twilight of an Era: 1934-1939 - documentary short 1960 - writer and producer
- Thousand Islands Summer - documentary short, Roger Blais 1960 - writer
- Sun, Sand and Sea: The Region - documentary short, James Beveridge 1961 - writer
- The Awakening - documentary short, James Beveridge 1961 - writer
- Vote for Michalski - documentary short, John Howe 1961 - writer
- Yukon Old, Yukon New - documentary short, John Howe 1962 - writer
- Sun, Sand and Sea - documentary short, James Beveridge 1962 - writer
- Aspirations - documentary short, James Beveridge 1962 - writer
- The Impact of the West - documentary short, James Beveridge 1962 - writer
- Nahanni - documentary short, Donald Wilder 1962 - writer
- The Contest for Power - documentary short, James Beveridge 1962 - writer
- New Voices - documentary short, James Beveridge 1962 - writer
- The Rough Road to Freedom - documentary short, James Beveridge 1961 - writer
- Drylanders - documentary, Don Haldane 1963 - writer
- Fisherman’s Gamble - documentary short, Ray Jones 1963 - writer
- Anniversary - short film 1963 - writer, producer and director
- Background to Latin America - documentary short, James Beveridge 1963 - writer
- Canada Between Two World Wars - documentary short 1963 - writer and producer
- Canada: Human Vaccine - documentary short, Hector Lemieux 1963 - writer
- Canada: Beef Cattle - documentary short, Hector Lemieux 1963 - writer
- Canada: Calf Leather - documentary short, Hector Lemieux 1963 - writer
- Canada: Heating Units - documentary short, Hector Lemieux 1963 - writer
- The Visit - documentary short John Kemeny 1964 - writer
- Turn of the Century - documentary short 1964 - writer and producer
- Haida Carver - documentary short, Richard Gilbert 1964 - writer
- Landfall Asia - documentary short, Gordon Sparling 1964 - writer
- Magic Molecule - documentary short, Hugh O'Connor & Christopher Chapman 1964 - writer
- The Way of Science - documentary short, Guy L. Coté 1965 - writer
- Trans-Canada Journey - documentary short, Graham Parker 1965 - writer
- Celebration - documentary short, 1966 - with Rex Tasker, producer and director
- Reception - documentary short, Douglas Jackson 1967 - writer
- New England and New France: 1490-1763 - documentary, Ronald Dick & Pierre L’Amare 1967 - writer
- Canada and the American Revolution: 1763-1783 - documentary, Ronald Dick & Pierre L’Amare 1967 - writer
- The War of 1812: Causes and Consequences: 1783-1818 - documentary, Ronald Dick & Pierre L’Amare 1967 - writer
- People of the Buffalo - documentary short, Austin Campbell 1968 - writer
- Dangerous Decades: 1818-1846 - documentary, Ronald Dick & Pierre L’Amare 1968 - writer
- The New Equation: Annexationism and Reciprocity: 1840-1860 - documentary, Ronald Dick & Pierre L’Amare 1968 - writer
- The Triumphant Union and the Canadian Confederation: 1863-1867 - documentary, Ronald Dick & Pierre L’Amare 1969 - writer
- The Border Confirmed: The Treaty of Washington: 1867-1871 - documentary, Ronald Dick & Pierre L’Amare 1969 - writer
- A Second Transcontinental Nation: 1872 - documentary, Ronald Dick & Pierre L’Amare 1969 - writer
- The Friendly 50s and the Sinister Sixties: 1850-1863 - documentary, Ronald Dick & Pierre L’Amare 1969 - writer
- Below Zero - documentary 1970, Michel Régnier 1970 - writer
- A Matter of Fat - documentary 1970 - writer and director
- Challenge for the Church - documentary short 1972 - writer and director
- The Aviators of Hudson Strait - documentary short 1973 - writer and producer
- Why Rock the Boat? - feature, John Howe 1974 - writer and producer
- Drylanders, 2-4 - documentary, Don Haldane 1974 - writer
- Seven Shades of Pale - documentary short, Les Rose 1975 - producer
- I’ve Never Walked the Steppes - documentary short, Jerry Krepakevich 1975 - producer
- Kaszuby - documentary short, André Herman 1975 - producer
- The World is Round - documentary short, Ian McLaren 1976 - producer
- The Walls Come Tumbling Down - documentary short 1976. With Pierre Lasry & Michael Rubbo - director
- Fort Good Hope - documentary, Ron Orieux 1977 - writer
- Bekevar Jubilee - documentary short, Albert Kish 1977 - producer
- Hold the Ketchup - documentary short, Albert Kish 1977 - producer
- The Hottest Show on Earth animated short, Wolf Koenig, Derek Lamb & Terence Macartney-Filgate 1977 - writer
- Sub-Igloo - documentary short, James de Beaujeu Domville & Joseph B. MacInnis 1977 - writer
- Our Kinda Talk: An Introduction to Margaret Laurence - documentary short, Robert Duncan 1978 - producer
- Margaret Laurence, First Lady of Manawaka - documentary, Robert Duncan 1978 - producer
- The Point - documentary, Robert Duncan 1978 - producer
- Arthritis: A Dialogue with Pain - documentary, Susan Huycke 1981 - producer
- The Concert Man - documentary short, Tony Ianzelo 1982 - writer
- Learning Ringette - documentary short, Bill Graziadei & Tony Ianzelo 1982 - producer
- Overtime - documentary, Marrin Canell 1984 - producer
- To Set Our House in Order - documentary short, Anne Wheeler 1985 - producer
- Going to War - documentary, Carol Moore-Ede 1985 - producer
- The Concert Stages of Europe - documentary short, Giles Walker 1985 - producer
- The Legs of the Lame - documentary short, Bruce Pittman 1985 - producer
- Uncle T - short film, Douglas Jackson 1985 - producer
- Mortimer Griffin and Shalinsky - short film, Mort Ransen 1985 - producer
- Esso - short film, Don McBrearty 1985 - producer
- The Sight - short film, Francis Mankiewicz 1985 - producer
- Connection - short film, Wolf Koenig 1985 - producer
- Happy Birthday, Hacker John - short film, Michael Keusch 1985 - producer
- Jack of Hearts - short film, Cynthia Scott 1985 - producer
- Red Shoes - short film, Allan Kroeker 1985 - producer
- The Dream and the Triumph - short film, Bruce Pittman 1986 - producer
- The Rebellion of Young David - short film, John N. Smith 1986 - producer
- Hotwalker - short film, Gil Cardinal 1986 - producer
- The Trumpeter - short film, Janice L. Platt 1986 - producer
- The Rise and Fall of English Montreal - documentary 1993 - writer and director

== Awards ==
Anniversary (1963)

- 16th Canadian Film Awards, Toronto: Genie Award for Best Theatrical Short Film, 1964

Celebration (1966)

- La Plata International Children's Film Festival, La Plata, Argentina: First Prize, Special Films, 1967

A Matter of Fat

- 22nd Canadian Film Awards, Toronto: Best Film Over 30 Minutes, 1970
- Atlanta Film Festival, Atlanta: Gold Medal, 1971
- Atlanta Film Festival, Atlanta: Special Jury Award, 1971
- American Film and Video Festival, New York: Blue Ribbon, 1971

Jack of Hearts (1985)

- Chicago International Children's Film Festival, Chicago: Second Prize - Live-Action Film Under 30 Minutes, 1986
- National Educational Media Network Competition, Oakland, California: Honorable Mention, Literary Adaptations, Elementary, 1986

Mortimer Griffin and Shalinsky (1985)

- American Film and Video Festival, New York: Red Ribbon, Literary Adaptations, 1986

Red Shoes (1985)

- Columbus International Film & Animation Festival, Columbus, Ohio: Bronze Plaque - Arts and Culture, 1986.
- Chicago International Children's Film Festival, Chicago: Honorable Mention, Live-Action Film Under 30 Minutes, 1986

== Bibliography ==
- Why Rock the Boat?: A Novel (1961)
- The Underdogs (1979)
- City Unique: Montreal Days and Nights in the 1940s and '50s (1996)
- The Underdogs: A Play (1998)
- Getting Started: A Memoir of the 1950s (2001)
- Crazy About Lili (2005)
