= Osmond Borradaile =

Canadian cinematographer

Osmond H. Borradaile
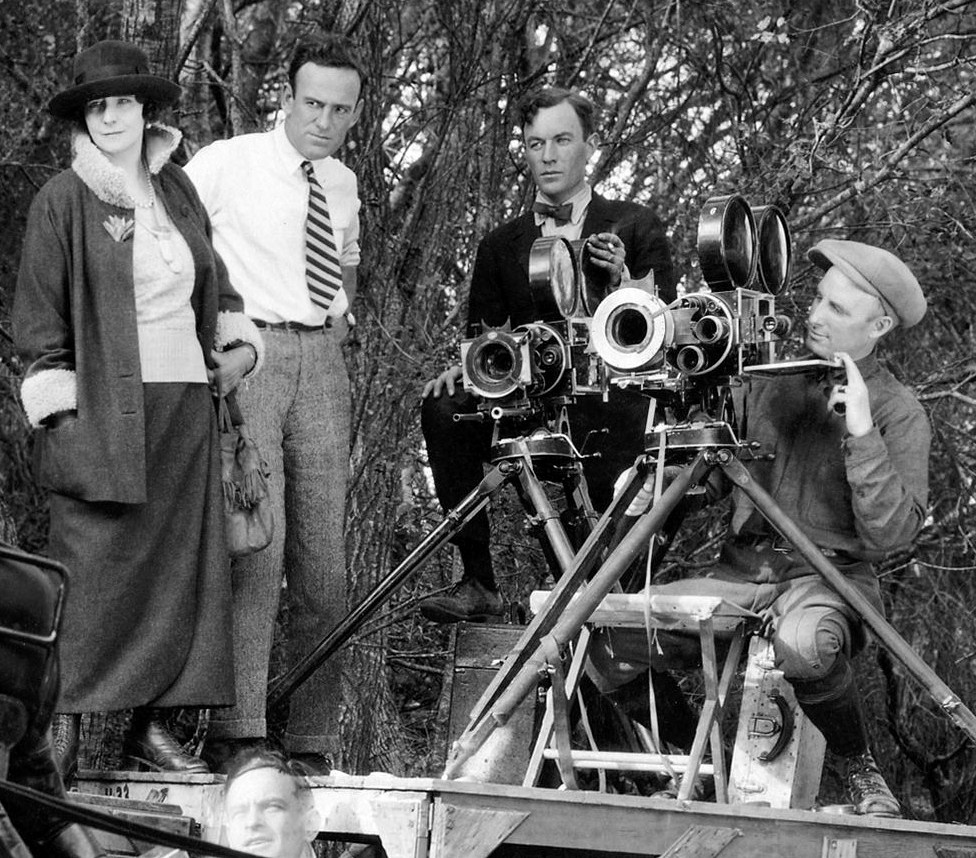
- Edythe Chapman, director Sam Wood, Alfred Gilks, and Osmond Borradaile at right; set of Beyond the Rocks (1922)
- Born: Osmond Hudson Borradaile; 17 July 1898; Winnipeg, Manitoba, Canada
- Died: 23 March 1999 (aged 100); West Vancouver, British Columbia, Canada
- Occupation: cinematographer
- Awards: Order of Canada

Osmond Hudson Borradaile OC (17 July 1898 – 23 March 1999) was a Canadian cameraman, cinematographer, and veteran of World War I and World War II.

== Biography ==
Born in Winnipeg, Osmond Borradaile grew up in Alberta, moving often during his childhood. While living in Medicine Hat, he saw one of his first movies when he was seven years old.

He started in Hollywood filming silent movies during which period he made movies starring, among others, Wallace Reid and legends such as Rudolph Valentino, Gloria Swanson, and Lillian Gish. He then went on to "talkies" working closely on numerous films with Cecil B. DeMille. He filmed the aerial sequences for Howard Hughes' Hell's Angels (Hughes was his pilot), this being a precursor to the location and outdoor shooting that would become his trademark. Borradaile's speciality was filming natural environments to serve as backdrops and stock footage. Much of this footage was taken in Africa, where he met and filmed the rituals and daily lives of several tribes. He was also behind the camera for the films of Sabu, including Elephant Boy, The Drum, and The Four Feathers, which was nominated for the Academy Award for Best Color Cinematography. In the late 1940s, Borradaile travelled to Antarctica to file sequences for Scott of the Antarctic, one of the most ambitious film projects for the time period.

In 1957, he was commissioned by the Government of British Columbia to make a documentary film commemorating the province's upcoming centennial. The Tall Country was released in 1958, and won the Genie Award for Best Theatrical Short Film at the 11th Canadian Film Awards in 1959.

In 1982, he was made an Officer of the Order of Canada, Canada's highest civilian honour.

He died eight months past his 100th birthday in Vancouver.

Borradaile's grandson is former rugby union footballer Norm Hadley.

== Selected filmography ==
- Say It with Music (1932)
- Sanders of the River (1934)
- Elephant Boy (1937)
- The Drum (1938)
- The Lion Has Wings (1939)
- The Overlanders (1946)
- Scott of the Antarctic (1948)
- Saints and Sinners (1949)
- I Was a Male War Bride (1949)
