= Nahanni (film) =

1962 film by Donald Wilder

- Directed by: Donald Wilder
- Written by: William Weintraub
- Produced by: Nicholas Balla
- Cinematography: Donald Wilder
- Edited by: George Kaczender
- Music by: Eldon Rathburn
- Distributed by: National Film Board of Canada
- Release date: 1962
- Running time: 18:23 minutes
- Country: Canada
- Languages: English; French

Nahanni (La Nahanni) is a 1962 short documentary from the National Film Board of Canada directed by Donald Wilder.

The film follows the pioneer explorer and prospector Albert Faille up the South Nahanni River in the Northwest Territories, in his repeated search for gold that is said to lure men to their doom.

Weintraub's narration depicted the popular image of the frontiersman: hardy, courageous, individualistic; life in the north the struggle of man against nature. At the time of this filming, Faille (pr Fay-lee) was 75 and suffered the lingering effects of a severe back injury sustained during WWI which had been re-injured in a fall on his first trip on the Nahanni River, in 1927. Aside from capturing the wild, wondrous beauty of the region, the film shows Faille's dogged dedication to his quest (his boat was named Nahanni or Bust).

At the time of the film's release, the Nahanni was about to undergo government exploration; from 1963-1965, the Geological Survey of Canada undertook 'Operation Nahanni' to map this little-known region of Canada, and the Department of Energy, Mines and Resources explored the area for its hydro-electric power potential. These activities, and the film, reflected the post-WWII "onward and upward" mood of the nation. The river is now the centrepiece of the Nahanni National Park Reserve.

In April 1972, shortly before Faille's death, the Edmonton Chamber of Commerce and Pacific Western Airlines sponsored Faille to fly to Edmonton to present Nahanni to school groups. With the sound off, Faille narrated the film, pausing it to add tales of gold, missing people, headless bodies, hot springs, trapping and wolves.

In 1995, Nahanni was re-released as Part 5 of Planet Earth, a 13-part collection of NFB films on environmental themes.

== Awards ==
- Berlin International Film Festival, Berlin: Silver Bear, Short Subjects, 1962
- World Film Festival Review, Acapulco: Diploma of Honour, 1962
- 15th Canadian Film Awards, Montreal: Best Theatrical Short, 1963
- 15th Canadian Film Awards, Montreal: Best Colour Cinematography to Donald Wilder, 1963
- Canadian Cinematography Awards, Montreal: Best Colour Film Produced in 1962, 1963
- International Festival of Mountain and Exploration Films, Trento: First Prize, Explorations 1963
- Columbus International Film & Animation Festival, Columbus, Ohio: Chris Award, General Information 1963
- Philadelphia International Festival of Short Films, Philadelphia: Award for Exceptional Merit, 1971
