= A Matter of Fat =

- Directed by: William Weintraub
- Written by: William Weintraub
- Produced by: Desmond Dew
- Narrated by: Lorne Greene
- Cinematography: Eugene Boyko; Jacques Fogel; Don Virgo
- Music by: Robert Fleming
- Production company: National Film Board of Canada
- Release date: 1969
- Country: Canada
- Language: English

A Matter of Fat is a 1969 documentary film produced by the National Film Board of Canada and directed by William Weintraub. It chronicles the efforts of a 358-pound man, Gilles Lorrain, to lose half his body weight as part of a hospital supervised weight loss program.

In the film, which is narrated by Lorne Greene, Lorrain recounts his life and experiences, often with humour. In one 21-second time lapse sequence, Weintraub shows Lorrain's 150-pound weight loss, filmed at two frames a day for seven months. The film also shows Lorrain's return to his family after the gruelling program, and his conviction that he will be one of one in four dieters who can keep the weight off.

In addition to focusing on Lorrain's story, the film explores what other obese people are doing to lose weight, and hears from medical authorities on misconceptions and practices in the weight loss industry. A Matter of Fat also motivated the film's director to lose weight.

== Awards ==
- 22nd Canadian Film Awards, Toronto: Best Film Over 30 Minutes, 1970
- Atlanta Film Festival, Atlanta: Gold Medal, 1971
- Atlanta Film Festival, Atlanta: Special Jury Award, 1971
- American Film and Video Festival, New York: Blue Ribbon, 1971

== See also ==
- Fat Chance, a 1994 NFB documentary about obesity
