= Jeanine Beaubien =

Canadian theatre woman

- Born: July 5, 1919; Montreal, Quebec, Canada
- Died: March 3, 2016 (aged 96); Montreal, Quebec, Canada
- Occupation: theatre woman

Jeanine Charbonneau Beaubien (July 5, 1919 – March 3, 2016) was a Canadian theatre woman.

== Biography ==
Born on July 5, 1919, in Montreal, Quebec. She was a daughter of Amanda LaBadie (1893–1979)] and de Jean-Pierre Charbonneau (1893–1970), jurist, President of the Bar of Montreal (1952) and judge of the Superior Court of Montreal (1955–1969), follower of pleasure sailing, like his father Napoléon Charbonneau (1853–1916), lawyer, federal deputy, then second judge of the Superior Court (1903–1916), and like his younger brother, D J. Henri Charbonneau (1901–1975), m.d., pediatrician, infectiologist] (Jules-Henri, uncle de Jeanine), and their descendants: Jeanine Charbonneau graduated in 1937, the year of her 18th birthday, at Villa Maria, in the neighborhood Notre-Dame-de-Grâce, one of the most reputable bilingual Catholic private colleges, then reserved for young girls. She was very interested in the adventure of the theatrical troop Les Compagnons de Saint-Laurent, founded that year.

She married Claude-Panet Beaubien (1908–1986), with whom she had 3 sons and a daughter, and known 8 grandchildren and 7 great-grandchildren. Her husband becomes vice-president of public relations and communications at Alcan – it is to him that we owe the evenings of the Alcan Theatre to CBC Television. She is co-founder of the Dramatic Art Society of Arvida, in Saguenay–Lac-Saint-Jean, where the head office of the Alcan. On leaving Arvida, the family lives in Quebec City, then returns to Montreal.

She admits having had an interest in theatre since the age of four and plays sporadically (notably under the direction of Father Émile Legault) and is a member of the executive committee of the Dramatic Art Festival of Canada. In 1957, on Saint Helen's Island, in Montreal, she founded the International Theatre "La Poudrière" (180 seats), to Montreal. She directed it until its closure in 1982, then publishing a book on the 25th anniversary of this multicultural institution.

She was then co-founder and active member of the Alzheimer Society of Montreal, then judge at the Citizenship Court (1997–2002), after having worked for the National Film Board of Canada and for 20th Century Fox, and is a member of the board of directors of Telefilm Canada (1996–2003).

== Bibliography ==
- Jeanine Charbonneau Beaubien, La Poudrière réincarnée: 25 years of international theatre in Montreal, Les éditions du Méridien. 1982; Miscellaneous, 1997, 210 p.ISBN 2-8941-5197-7, 978-2-8941-5197-6
- Review: Michel Vaïs (2000). "When we played on Île Sainte-Hélène: "La Poudrière réincarnée"". Game, Theatre Review (in French). Vol. 95, no. 2. pp. 58–62.

== Awards ==
- 1960: Member of the Royal Society of Arts of London
- 1974: Member of the order of Canada
- 1975: Doctorate Honoris Causa from Bishop's University
- 2004: Officière of Ordre national du Québec
