= Aramco World =

Magazine about the Arabic and Muslim world

- Founded: November 1949 (as Saudi Aramco World)
- Country: United States
- Based in: Houston
- Website: aramcoworld.com
- ISSN: 2376-1075
- OCLC: 933724912

Aramco World (formerly Saudi Aramco World) is a bi-monthly magazine published by Aramco Services Company, a US-based subsidiary of Saudi Aramco, the state-owned oil company of the Kingdom of Saudi Arabia. The first issue of the magazine appeared in November 1949. The bimonthly magazine is published in Houston, Texas.

The magazine began as an internal company publication, but was expanded to a general interest format with distribution beyond company employees in the first decade of its existence. Published in English under the close editorial supervision of the Saudi authorities, the magazine was in particular intended to foster a sense of belonging at Aramco for employees and their families, as well as to more generally promote the company's interests. Its coverage focuses on the Arab world as a whole, albeit with an emphasis on perspectives thought to be of interest to its primarily American intended audience.

== History ==
Aramco World was founded in 1949 in New York as a publication of the Arabian-American Oil Company (now Saudi Aramco). Originally published to inform American Aramco employees of company activities, the magazine's coverage was expanded over the following decade to a more general interest format, modeled after contemporary US magazines such as Life and The Saturday Evening Post, and covering a wide variety of topics related to the Arab world and oil industry. In 1964, it moved its headquarters to Beirut, and relocated again in 1975 due to the Lebanese Civil War.

Under the close editorial control of the Saudi government, the magazine serves as a public relations effort to promote a "favorable business climate" for the oil industry and in particular to foster a sense of belonging at the company for American employees and their families, as well as to curb negative sentiment against the company both from both employees and the public. The magazine is noted for its inclusion of full-color visual features, and its coverage of film production in Lebanon during the magazine's Beirut residency is a noteworthy resource for area studies, albeit with significant biases towards the interests of US audiences.
