= Judith Crawley =

Canadian film director

Judith Crawley and family
- Judith Crawley and family, c. 1950
- Born: Judith Rosemary Sparks; April 12, 1914; Ottawa, Ontario, Canada
- Died: September 16, 1986 (aged 72); Ottawa, Ontario, Canada
- Other name: Judith Rosemary Sparks Crawley
- Education: McGill University
- Occupation: Filmmaker
- Known for: Filmmaking
- Spouse: Frank Radford "Budge" Crawley
- Children: Michal; Patrick; Roderick; Alexander; Jennifer; Mariah
- Awards: Genie Award for Outstanding Contributions to the Canadian Film Industry

Judith Rosemary (Sparks) Crawley (April 21, 1914 – September 16, 1986) was a Canadian film producer, cinematographer, director, and screenwriter. She and her husband Frank Radford "Budge" Crawley co-founded the production company Crawley Films in 1939.

Crawley is best known for writing the Academy Award-winning documentary The Man Who Skied Down Everest. She is considered to be the first Canadian female filmmaker, and is recognized as being a pioneer for women who work in the film industry.

== Early life ==
Judith "Judy" Sparks was born in Ottawa, Ontario to Roderick Percy Sparks, a prominent tariff counsel and Rheba (Fraser) Sparks. She studied at the Ottawa Ladies' College, and later studying English and economics from 1933 to 1936, graduated from McGill University, having earned a Bachelor of Arts.

After her marriage to her next door neighbour, "Budge" Crawley, on October 1, 1938, Crawley became interested in filmmaking.

== Filmmaking career ==
Crawley wrote the script and edited Île d'Orléans (1938), the first film she worked on with her husband. Shot during their honeymoon, the film won the Hiram Percy Maxim Award from the Royal Canadian Geographical Society for Best Amateur Film in 1939, making their collaboration the first Canadian film to receive this type of recognition.

Crawley and her husband founded Crawley Films in 1939. As her family grew, Crawley became increasingly interested how to properly raise children. In 1947, she wrote, directed and starred in the educational childcare short film Know Your Baby. Despite its financial failure upon release, the film became immensely popular with audiences, and prompted two follow-up series commissioned by McGraw Hill. (Note: From 1949 to 1957, Crawley directed another childcare series entitled Ages and Stages, which featured some of her children.)

From 1941 to 1944, after being hired by renewed Scottish documentary filmmaker John Grierson, Crawley became a freelance cinematographer, screenwriter, editor and director for the National Film Board of Canada (NFB), often working with her husband. During her time at the NFB, Crawley directed Four New Apple Dishes, the first NFB film to be directed by a woman.

As an independent filmmaker on contract to the NFB, the Crawley's The Loon's Necklace (1950) "remains in the national collective unconscious of generations of Canadians.

In 1957, Crawley and her husband were given a joint Canadian Film Award.

After 1961, Crawley elected to focus on producing and writing rather than directing. As a result, Crawley wrote the script for The Man Who Skied Down Everest, which in 1975 won the Academy Award for Best Documentary Feature. This film was the first Canadian-made production to take home the Academy Award for Best Documentary .

After separating from her husband in 1965, Crawley founded another film production company with two of her children, Michal and Jennifer.

From 1979 to 1982, Crawley was the president of the Canadian Film Institute.

In 1986, Crawley and her husband received a joint Special Achievement Genie Award for their continued work in the Canadian film industry.

== Death ==
On September 16, 1986, Crawley died from respiratory disease.

== Partial filmography ==
Year	Title	Credited As
1938	Île d'Orleans	Writer, Editor
1939	A Study of Spring Wild Flowers	Director
1940	Four New Apple Dishes	Director
1941	Ottawa on the River	Director
1941	Who Sheds His Blood	Director, Writer
1943	Terre de nos aieüx (National Film Board)	Cinematograher
1947	Know Your Baby	Director
1948	Holiday Island	Director
1948	Why Won't Tommy Eat?	Director
1949	He Acts His Age	Director
1951	The Terrible Twos and the Trusting Threes	Director
1953	The Frustrating Fours and the Fascinating Fives	Director
1954	Food for Freddy	Director
1954	From Sociable Six to Noisy Nine	Director
1958	Legend of the Raven	Producer
1975	The Man Who Skied Down Everest	Writer
1985	The Start of a Lifetime	Director
