= Donald Wilder =

Cinematographer (1926–2010)

Donald Wilder (October 23, 1926 – December 8, 2010) was a Canadian cinematographer and documentarian. He is most noted as a two-time Canadian Film Award winner for Best Cinematography, winning at the 15th Canadian Film Awards in 1963 for Nahanni and at the 25th Canadian Film Awards in 1973 for Paperback Hero, and as the director of Nahanni, which was also its years Canadian Film Award winner for Best Theatrical Short Film.

His other cinematography credits included the films The Stratford Adventure, When Michael Calls, Meatballs and Lost!.
