= Clément Perron =

Canadian film director and screenwriter

- Born: July 3, 1929; Quebec City, Quebec, Canada
- Died: October 12, 1999 (aged 70); Pointe-Claire, Quebec, Canada
- Occupations: Film director Film producer Screenwriter
- Years active: 1958 - 1994

Clément Perron (July 3, 1929 – October 12, 1999) was a Canadian film director and screenwriter.

== Early life and education ==
Perron was born in Quebec City, Quebec. After graduating from the University of Laval with a Bachelor of Arts in Philosophy Perron went to France to continue his studies with the goal of becoming a teacher. He studied linguistics at the Academie de Portier.

== Career ==
After watching screenings at the Cinémathèque française in Paris, Perron became interested in cinema and on his return to Canada in 1957, he joined the NFB as a writer.

In 1960, he began directing documentary shorts and in 1962, found critical success with his film Day After Day (Jour après jour), which won two Canadian Film Awards. Perron continued to work primarily on documentaries until the NFB decided to make an attempt at a more commercial cinema in the late sixties and early seventies. He directed three fiction feature-length films of moderate success during this time period but his biggest accomplishment was writing the screenplay for Mon oncle Antoine (1971) which was based on his own childhood experiences.

Perron retired from the NFB in 1986 to work in the private sector primarily as a writer. Perron died in 1999 in Pointe-Claire, Quebec.

== Selected filmography ==
=== Fiction ===
- Caroline (Short Co-Directed with Georges Dufaux, 1964) (Re-Released as part of the 1964 anthology film Trois Femmes)
- It Isn't Jacques Cartier's Fault (C'est pas la faute à Jacques Cartier) (Co-Directed with Georges Dufaux, 1968)
- Stop (1971, screenplay)
- Taureau (1973)
- Bound for Glory (Partis pour la gloire) (1975)

=== Documentaries ===
- Georges-P. Vanier: soldat, diplomate, gouverneur général (Short, 1960)
- Crossbreeding for Profit (Short, Co-Directed with Pierre Patry, 1961)
- Loisirs (Short, Co-Directed with Pierre Patry, 1962)
- Les bacheliers de la cinquième (Short Co-Directed with Francis Séguillon, 1962)
- Day After Day (Jour après jour) (Short, 1962)
- Marie-Victorin (Short, 1963)
- Salut Toronto! (Short, 1965)
- Cinéma et réalité (Co-Directed with Georges Dufaux, 1967)
- Fermont, P.Q. (Co-Directed with Monique Fortier, 1980)
