= F. R. Crawley =

Canadian producer and director

- Crawley, c. 1950
- Born: Frank Radford Crawley; November 14, 1911; Ottawa, Ontario, Canada
- Died: May 13, 1987 (aged 75); Toronto, Ontario, Canada
- Other name: "Budge" Crawley
- Occupation: Film producer
- Known for: Filmmaking
- Spouse: Judith Crawley
- Children: 6
- Awards: Order of Canada

Frank Radford "Budge" Crawley, OC (November 14, 1911 – May 13, 1987) was a Canadian film producer, cinematographer and director. Along with his wife Judith Crawley, he co-founded the production company Crawley Films in 1939.

Crawley is best known for producing the Academy Award-winning documentary The Man Who Skied Down Everest. During his 40-year career, he produced hundreds of films. Film historian Peter Morris described Crawley as "the Godfather of Canadian film and Canada's answer to Sam Goldwyn."

== Early life ==
Frank Radford "Budge" Crawley was born November 14, 1911, in Ottawa, Ontario. His early interest in filmmaking was shared by his next-door neighbour, Judith Sparks. The pair married on October 1, 1938, beginning a long working relationship as a filmmaking team.

== Career ==
While on their honeymoon, Judith wrote the script and edited Île d'Orléans (1938), the first film she worked on with her husband. Crawley shot and directed the film that won the Hiram Percy Maxim Award from the Royal Canadian Geographical Society for Best Amateur Film in 1939, making their collaboration the first Canadian film to receive this type of recognition.

Crawley was a pioneer in the creation of an independent Canadian film sector. Although he worked intermittently as an independent filmmaker on contract with the National Film Board of Canada (NFB), Crawley chose to work independently rather than with NFB or the Canadian Broadcasting Corporation. (Note: His wife Judith Crawley also worked for the NFB as a freelancer.)

Crawley was known for making avant-garde films with his wife Judith Crawley. Together they owned the Crawley Films company which produced numerous short films, feature films, television commercials, animated cartoons and other productions. The first Canadian Film Award (a precursor to the contemporary Canadian Screen Awards) in 1949 went to Crawley Films for The Loon's Necklace (1948), a film based on a Tsimshian legend.

After the Second World War, the company grew quickly and provided a great training ground for young Canadian filmmakers eager to launch film careers. At that time, the NFB was the only other major filmmaking body, until CBC television went live in 1952. During the 50 years that the company operated, from 1939 until its sale to Atkinson Film Arts in 1982, Crawley Films made thousands of films and received hundreds of film awards.

After separating from her husband in 1965, Judith Crawley founded another film production company with two of her children, Michal and Jennifer.

== Awards and recognition ==
The Man Who Skied Down Everest won the 1975 Academy Award for Best Documentary Feature, becoming the first Canadian-produced film to win an Oscar in this category.

The Crawleys won several Canadian Film Awards and a Special Achievement Genie for Outstanding Contributions to the Canadian Film Industry in 1986.

In 1977, the City of Ottawa awarded Crawley the Key to the City.

In 1980, Crawley was made an Officer of the Order of Canada "in recognition of a unique contribution to film in Canada".

The Canadian Film Institute in Ottawa premiered Budge: The One True Happiness of F. R. 'Budge' Crawley (2003), a one-hour documentary examining the career of the maverick Canadian film producer, Budge Crawley. The film is based in part on interviews contained in the Information Research Services (IRS) publication: Budge: F. R. Crawley and Crawley Films, 1939-1982. Produced and directed by Michael Ostroff and written by Seaton Findlay, the Cine Metu video was developed in association with Bravo! Canada for broadcast.

== Partial filmography ==
- 1938: Ile d'Orléans
- 1942: Quebec – Path of Conquest
- 1948: The Loon's Necklace
- 1950: Newfoundland Scene
- 1953: The Power Within
- 1958: The Legend of the Raven
- 1961: Tales of the Wizard of Oz (animated series for Videocraft-Rankin/Bass)
- 1963: Amanita Pestilens
- 1963: Nuclear Power Demonstration (NPD)
- 1964: The Luck of Ginger Coffey
- 1964: Return to Oz (television special) (for Videocraft-Rankin/Bass)
- 1966: 1966 Marine Drive
- 1967: The Entertainers
- 1971: Hamlet (television)
- 1972: The Rowdyman (executive producer)
- 1973: August and July
- 1975: The Man Who Skied Down Everest
- 1975: Janis
- 1982: Heartland Reggae
