= 1977 Toronto International Film Festival =

Annual Canadian film festival

- Festival poster
- Opening film: J.A. Martin Photographer
- Location: Toronto, Ontario, Canada
- Hosted by: Toronto International Film Festival Group
- Festival date: September 9, 1977–September 18, 1977
- Language: English
- Website: tiff.net
- 1978 1976

The 2nd Toronto International Film Festival (TIFF) took place in Toronto, Ontario, Canada between September 9 and September 18, 1977. Retrospective of Quebec cinema was introduced and also Greek cinema was emphasized. J.A. Martin Photographer directed by Jean Beaudin was selected as the opening film.

Chantal Akerman's film Je, tu, il, elle was pulled out of the festival by the Ontario Censor Board, over the objections of festival organizers, because of a scene featuring a kiss between two women.

== Programme ==
=== Gala Presentations ===
- The Ascent (Voskhozhdeniye) — Larisa Shepitko (Soviet Union)
- Bobby Deerfield — Sydney Pollack (United States)
- The Innocent (L'Innocente) — Luchino Visconti (Italy)
- J.A. Martin Photographer (J.A. Martin photographe) — Jean Beaudin (Canada)
- Jacob the Liar (Jakob der Lügner) — Frank Beyer (Germany)
- Joseph Andrews — Tony Richardson (United Kingdom)
- One Man — Robin Spry (Canada)
- One Sings, the Other Doesn't (L'une chante, l'autre pas) — Agnès Varda (France)
- Outrageous! — Richard Benner (Canada)
- Solemn Communion (La Communion solemnelle) — René Féret (France)

=== Max Ophüls Retrospective ===
- Caught
- The Earrings of Madame de...
- The Exile
- Letter from an Unknown Woman
- Liebelei
- Lola Montès
- Le Plaisir
- The Reckless Moment
- La Ronde

=== Frank Capra Retrospective ===
- The Bitter Tea of General Yen
- It Happened One Night
- It's a Wonderful Life
- The Miracle Woman
- Mr. Smith Goes to Washington

=== Quebec Retrospective ===
Important historical films from Quebec, curated by Jean-Paul Bastien of the Cinémathèque québécoise.

- 15 novembre — Michel Brault
- À tout prendre — Claude Jutra
- Bar Salon — André Forcier
- The Cat in the Bag (Le Chat dans le sac) — Gilles Groulx
- Don't Let It Kill You (Il ne faut pas mourir pour ça) — Jean Pierre Lefebvre
- The Last Betrothal (Les derniers fiançailles) — Jean Pierre Lefebvre
- Little Tougas (Ti-Cul Tougas) — Jean-Guy Noël
- Manouane River Lumberjacks (Bûcherons de la Manouane) — Arthur Lamothe
- Ordinary Tenderness (Tendresse ordinaire) — Jacques Leduc
- Pour la suite du monde — Michel Brault, Marcel Carrière, Pierre Perrault
- The Rape of a Sweet Young Girl (Le Viol d'une jeune fille douce) — Gilles Carle
- Réjeanne Padovani — Denys Arcand
- The River Schooners (Les Voitures d'eau) — Pierre Perrault
- The True Nature of Bernadette (La Vraie Nature de Bernadette) — Gilles Carle
- The Vultures (Les Vautours) — Jean-Claude Labrecque
- Whispering City (La Forteresse) — Fedor Ozep

=== Buried Treasures ===
- O.K. ... Laliberté — Marcel Carrière

=== Unverified program ===
- Alice or the Last Escapade (Alice ou la dernière fugue) — Claude Chabrol
- The Ambassadors (Les Ambassadeurs) — Naceur Ktari
- Anatomy of a Relationship (Anatomie d'un rapport) — Luc Moullet, Antonietta Pizzorno
- Beluga Days (Le Beau plaisir) — Pierre Perrault, Michel Brault, Bernard Gosselin
- The Best Way to Walk (La meilleure façon de marcher) — Claude Miller
- Between the Lines — Joan Micklin Silver
- Born to Win — Ivan Passer
- Boudu Saved from Drowning (Boudu sauvé des eaux) — Jean Renoir
- Burn! (Queimada) — Gillo Pontecorvo
- But What Do They Want? (Mais qu'est-ce qu'elles veulent) — Coline Serreau
- The Cars That Ate Paris — Peter Weir
- La Cecilia — Jean-Louis Comolli
- Charlie and His Two Chicks (Charlie et ses deux nénettes) — Joël Séria
- Chinese Roulette (Chinesisches Roulette) — Rainer Werner Fassbinder
- The Colors of Iris — Nikos Panayotopoulos
- Dance Squared (Danse carrée) — René Jodoin
- Diary of a Lover (Tagebuch eines Liebenden) — Sohrab Shahid-Saless
- Duel — Steven Spielberg
- Erica Minor — Bertrand Van Effenterre
- Essai à la mille — Jean-Claude Labrecque
- Eugénie de Sade — Jesús Franco
- Father (Apa) — István Szabó
- Gizmo! — Howard Smith
- The Fire Within (Le Feu follet) — Louis Malle
- The Fox and the Crow (Le Corbeau et le renard) — Pierre Hébert, Yves Leduc, Francine Desbiens, Michèle Pauzé
- The Gold of Naples (L'oro di Napoli) — Vittorio De Sica
- Happy Day — Pantelis Voulgaris
- Hell No Longer (Le mépris n'aura qu'un temps) — Arthur Lamothe
- Here Is Your Life (Här har du ditt liv) — Jan Troell
- Hollywood on Trial — David Helpern
- I Wish to Speak (Proshu slova) — Gleb Panfilov
- Images of China (Images de Chine) — Auguste François
- Iphigenia — Michael Cacoyannis
- Jean Carignan, Fiddler (Jean Carignan, violoneux) — Bernard Gosselin
- Jill Johnston October 1975-6 — Kay Armatage, Lydia Wazana
- Judge Fayard Called the Sheriff (Le Juge Fayard dit Le Shériff) — Yves Boisset
- Lions Love — Agnès Varda
- Mindscape (Le Paysagiste) — Jacques Drouin
- The Misfits — John Huston
- Monsieur Pointu — André Leduc, Bernard Longpré
- Mother of Many Children — Alanis Obomsawin
- The Night of Saint-Germain-des-Prés (La Nuit de Saint-Germain-des-Prés) — Bob Swaim
- Nights of Cabiria — Federico Fellini
- Nine Months (Kilenc hónap) — Márta Mészáros
- Op Hop - Hop Op — Pierre Hébert
- Percé on the Rocks — Gilles Carle
- Planet Venus (Pianeta Venere) — Elda Tattoli
- La poulette grise — Norman McLaren
- Québec en silence — Gilles Gascon
- The Reason Why — Tasos Psarras
- Rhapsody in Two Languages — Gordon Sparling
- The Ride — Gerald Potterton
- Serpico — Sidney Lumet
- The Snowshoers (Les Raquetteurs) — Michel Brault, Gilles Groulx
- Steamboat Bill, Jr. — Charles Reisner
- La Strada — Federico Fellini
- Stroszek — Werner Herzog
- The Travelling Players (O Thiasos) — Theo Angelopoulos
- Umberto D. — Vittorio De Sica
- Such a Simple Game (Un jeu si simple) — Gilles Groulx
- Waterloo — Sergei Bondarchuk
- When Joseph Returns (Ha megjön József) — Zsolt Kézdi-Kovács
- When the Poppies Bloom Again (Dokter Pulder zaait papavers) — Bert Haanstra
- Wrestling (La lutte) — Michel Brault, Marcel Carrière, Claude Fournier, Claude Jutra
