= Guy L. Coté =

Canadian filmmaker (1925–1994)

- Born: 30 August 1925; Ottawa, Ontario, Canada
- Died: 12 September 1994 (aged 69); Montreal, Quebec, Canada
- Education: Oxford University; Concordia University; Université Laval; University of Ottawa
- Occupations: Producer, director, editor, archivist, writer
- Years active: 1951–1987

Guy L. Coté PhD (1925–1994) was a Canadian filmmaker with the National Film Board of Canada. He was also founding president of the Canadian Federation of Film Societies, and co-founder of the Cinémathèque québécoise and the Montreal World Film Festival.

== Early life ==
Guy Louis Coté was born in Ottawa in 1925, the eldest child of Louis Côté and Stella Cimon. His was a prominent family; his father was a Senator, his maternal grandfather was the politician and judge Ernest Cimon. After graduating from the University of Ottawa in 1944, he moved to Université Laval, graduating in 1947 with a B.Sc. in chemistry-physics. He also earned a Rhodes Scholarship and, from 1947 to 1952, attended Oxford University (St John's College), graduating with a B.A. (Hons) in chemistry.

While at Oxford, Coté developed his long-held interest in cinema. He wrote about film for the student newspaper Isis, eventually becoming its editor-in-chief. He became president of the Student Film Society, and sat on the committee of the Experimental Film Group (EFG). He wanted to make the Oxford Film Society the largest in the UK, and hoped to allocate more funds to the EFG, whose members were keen to become avant-garde filmmakers.

By 1951, he was captain of the Oxford Ski Team and was asked to make a film about the skiing competition between Oxford and Cambridge University which was to take place in Sestriere, Italy. With a budget of £750, he produced Sestriere, a film of such quality that it was screened in Norway and Canada, and aired on French television.

In 1952, the EFG was looking for a strong subject for a summer film. Fellow EFG member Sam Kaner proposed a ballet film. Resources were begged and borrowed; the result was the first film Coté directed, Between Two Worlds.

== Career ==
In the course of raising funds to make Between Two Worlds, Coté had contacted the London office of the National Film Board of Canada (NFB). James Beveridge was in charge of that office at the time; by now, Coté had given up the idea of becoming a physics professor and, when he graduated in 1952 and was about to return to Canada, Beveridge recommended him to the board. He was hired in 1953, becoming one of the original members of Studio B. He directed his first film, Winter in Canada, and launched Canadian Newsreel, a newsletter for the hundreds of film clubs which had sprung up around the NFB series Canada Carries On and Eye Witness. With Dorothy Burritt of the Toronto Film Society, he also founded the Canadian Federation of Film Societies.

Coté was then sent back to England to run the NFB's London office. He returned in 1955, just as the NFB was moving from Ottawa to Montreal. His filmmaking duties were light; he made one film in 1955, two in 1956 and none in 1957. Instead, he concentrated on archivism. Coté had been collecting cinematic material all of his life—films, posters, press clippings and books, writing in 1964 "It is interesting to collect books. But why make (a collection) like I did? Because it was necessary. I spent a fortune making this library. One day it will go...to a cinematheque".

Coté became involved with the Canadian Film Institute, the Professional Association of Filmmakers, the Knowledge of Cinema Foundation, the Canadian Film Club Federation and the Montreal International Film Festival. One of the festival's founders was his boss at the NFB, Pierre Juneau, who placed him on the board. Much of his time through the late 1950s was spent on organizing the festival, which would launch in 1960 and end, due to in-fighting, ideological differences and politics, in 1967.

In 1962, the Canadian Film Club Federation created a film education committee called "Cognizance du Cinéma". In 1964, it became the Museum of Canadian Cinema, or Cinémathèque Canadienne, with Coté as its president. In 1968, the majority of its board members voted to center the institution's activities around the interests of Quebec and re-name it Cinémathèque Québécoise. Coté strongly opposed this and resigned over the issue. But he was contractually obligated to sell his archival collection to the Cinémathèque, which took possession of it in 1970. The collection became the Documentation Centre at the Cinémathèque Québécoise. The Documentation Centre is now the Médiathèque Guy-L.-Coté and is one of the largest film reference libraries in North America.

As part of Expo 67 celebrations, Coté organized the International Animation Film Exhibition, a retrospective of international animation cinema. In 1969, the NFB created Studio D for French-language production and Coté became its program manager and chief documentary producer. While this position only lasted one year, he was back in the same role from 1985 to 1987. During that time, commissioner François N. Macerola was developing a new five-year plan for the NFB; it was Coté who prepared detailed reports to defend production spending—he also proposed that the provincial governments pay for regional production and the head office pay only for production of films on national issues. While others privately agreed with him, this was considered 'heresy' and the proposal was not accepted.

In 1976, Coté co-organized a film festival for Montreal's Week on Ageing, Age and Life, for which he created four films: Monsieur Journault, Blanche et Claire, Les vieux amis and Rose et Monsieur Charbonneau. In 1979, as part of the NFB's 40th birthday celebrations, he created a trilogy on international cooperation: Marastoon: The Place Where One Is Helped (Afghanistan), Dominga (Bolivia), and Azzel (Niger).

Coté's last films were a series of documentaries about the history of religion in Quebec culture which, with François Brault, Gilles Lenoir and Raymond Gauthier, he produced through 1987.

== Personal life and death ==
Coté met and married Nancy McCallum in England in 1952; they had four children. In 1977, Guy and Nancy returned to school, going to night classes in Sociology at Concordia University before applying to the Master's program at Oxford. Coté took a sabbatical from the NFB and they both earned their Master's degrees in Sociology, graduating in 1982. Guy continued on, studying social mobility, and obtained his doctorate from Oxford in 1983, after which he lectured on sociology at the University of Montreal. In 1987, the NFB offered filmmakers early retirement packages; Coté retired and went to work for Statistics Canada, spending two years on a study of the social positions of occupations.

In 1977, the Cotés bought a second home in Frelighsburg, in Quebec's Eastern Townships. Coté became vice-president of the local historical society and wrote articles about the region for the newspaper La Voix de l'Est. (He was also Treasurer of the Champlain-Adirondack Biosphere Reserve and Vice-President of Parks and Natural Spaces for the Fondation de la faune du Québec.)

Near Frelighsburg is Mount Pinnacle, a pristine mountain favoured by hikers and nature-lovers. In 1987, the provincial government approved a plan to develop Mount Pinnacle into a ski and golf resort. To fight this, Coté helped to mobilize the Association for the Conservation of Mount Pinnacle. The developer's plan was ultimately unsuccessful and Mount Pinnacle is preserved, but the battle became so intense that the developer sued the association, the municipality and Coté, personally.

In the spring of 1993, with the stress of the situation mounting, Coté and his wife traveled to Switzerland, where he suffered a heart attack. They spent seven months in Tourtour, on the French Riviera so Coté could recuperate, but they had to return to Quebec to prepare for the trial. In August 1994, Coté suffered a second heart attack, which left him in a coma. He died in Montreal on September 6, at the age of 69.

Although Coté was fully-bilingual and a French-language producer, it is presumably because he was from Ontario that he was not awarded honours such as the Prix Albert-Tessier.

== Filmography ==
Oxford University Film Society

- Sistrières 1951 – producer, director
- Between Two Worlds 1951 – director

National Film Board of Canada

- Winter in Canada – documentary short, 1953 – writer, director
- Grain Handling in Canada – documentary short, 1955 – writer, director
- Tu enfanteras dans la joie – short film, Bernard Devlin 1956 – animator
- Raw Material – short film, Bernard Devlin 1956 – co-editor with David Mayerovitch
- Canada Carries On: Industrial Canada – documentary short, 1958 – editor, producer, director, co-writer with Gilbert Choquette
- Railroaders – documentary short, 1958 – writer, editor, director
- Fishermen – documentary short, 1959 – writer, editor, director
- Roughnecks: The Story of Oil Drillers – documentary short, 1960 – writer, editor, director
- Cattle Ranch – documentary short, 1961 – writer, editor, director
- Kindergarten – documentary short, 1962 – editor, director
- Runner – documentary short, Don Owen 1962 – co-editor with Don Owen
- Lonely Boy – documentary short, 1962 – co-editor with John Spotton
- The Living Machine – documentary, Roman Kroitor 1962 – co-editor with Robert Russell
- The Persistent Seed – documentary short, Christopher Chapman 1964 – co-editor with Christopher Chapman
- Toronto Jazz – documentary short, Don Owen 1964 – co-editor with Don Owen
- An Essay on Science – documentary short, 1964 – director
- Regards sur l'occultisme: Magie et miracles – documentary, 1965 – director, co-editor with Arthur Lipsett
- Regards sur l'occultisme (2e partie) – Science et esprits – documentary, 1965 – director, co-editor with Arthur Lipsett
- The Waterdevil – short film, Raymond Garceau 1966 – producer
- Harvesting – documentary short, Arthur Lamothe 1966 – co-producer with Marcel Martin
- Big Rock – feature, Raymond Garceau 1967 – producer
- Le règne du jour (The Times That Are) – documentary, Pierre Perrault 1967 – co-producer with Jacques Bobet
- Twenty Million People – documentary short, Arnie Gelbart 1967 – editor
- Chantal: en vrac – short film, Jacques Leduc 1967 – producer
- Masque – documentary short, Jacques Kasma 1968 – producer
- Les voitures d'eau (The River Schooners) – feature, Pierre Perrault 1968 – co-producer with Jacques Bobet
- Nominingue... depuis qu'il existe – documentary, Jacques Leduc 1968 – producer
- Beluga Days – documentary short, Michel Brault, Bernard Gosselin and Pierre Perrault 1968 – co-producer with Jacques Bobet
- Mother-To-Be – documentary, Anne Claire Poirier 1969 – producer
- Éloge du chiac – documentary short, Michel Brault 1969 – producer
- Là ou Ailleurs – documentary short, Jacques Leduc and Pierre Bernier 1969 – producer
- A Total Service – documentary short, Arnie Gelbart and Jacques Leduc 1969 – co-producer with Marc Beaudet
- Where Are You? – feature, Gilles Groulx 1969 – producer
- Wake up, mes bons amis – documentary, Pierre Perrault 1970 – co-producer with Paul Larose and Tom Daly
- Cotton Mill, Treadmill (On est au coton) – documentary, Denys Arcand 1970 – co-producer with Marc Beaudet and Pierre Maheu
- Acadia, Acadia (L'Acadie, L'Acadie?!?) – documentary, Michel Brault and Pierre Perrault 1971 – co-producer with Paul Larose
- Tranquillement, pas vite – documentary, 1972 – editor, director
- Both Sides of the Coin – documentary, 1974 – editor, director
- Monsieur Journault – documentary, 1976 – director
- Blanche et Claire – documentary, 1976 – director
- Les vieux amis – documentary, 1976 – director
- Rose et Monsieur Charbonneau – documentary, 1976 – editor, director
- Marastoon: The Place Where One Is Helped – documentary short, 1979 – director
- Azzel – documentary short, 1979 – director
- Dominga – documentary short, 1979 – director
- Le Combat d'Onésime Tremblay – documentary, Jean-Thomas Bédard 1985 – co-producer with Jean Dansereau
- MenoTango – documentary short, Sylvie Van Brabant 1986 – co-executive producer with Raymond Gauthier
- J'ai pas dit mon dernier mot – documentary, Yvon Provost 1986 – co-producer with Jean Dansereau
- Discussions in Bioethics: The Old Woman – documentary short, Gilles Blais 1986 – producer
- L'Amour en famille – documentary, Francine Prévost 1986 – co-producer with Jean Dansereau
- Nuageux avec éclaircies – documentary, Sylvie Van Brabant 1986 – co-producer with Jean Dansereau and Raymond Gauthier
- Dom Bellot, architecte, 1876–1943 – documentary short, François Brault 1986 – co-producer with Gilles Lenoir and Raymond Gauthier
- Les Anges dans l'art au Québec – documentary short, François Brault 1986 – co-producer with Gilles Lenoir and Raymond Gauthier
- Calvaires et Croix de chemin – documentary short, François Brault 1986 – co-producer with Gilles Lenoir and Raymond Gauthier
- Les Chemins de croix au Québec – documentary short, François Brault 1986 – co-producer with Gilles Lenoir and Raymond Gauthier
- Les Églises protestantes au Québec – documentary short, François Brault 1987 – co-producer with Gilles Lenoir and Raymond Gauthier
- Louis Jobin, sculpteur, 1845–1928 – documentary short, François Brault 1987 – co-producer with Gilles Lenoir and Raymond Gauthier
- Louis-Amable Quévillon, sculpteur et ornemaniste, 1749–1823 – documentary short, François Brault 1987 – co-producer with Gilles Lenoir and Raymond Gauthier
- Napoléon Bourassa (1827–1916) et la décoration d'églises – documentary short, François Brault 1987 – co-producer with Gilles Lenoir and Raymond Gauthier
- Thomas Baillairgé, architecte, 1791–1859 – documentary short, François Brault 1987 – co-producer with Gilles Lenoir and Raymond Gauthier
- La Peinture en Nouvelle-France – documentary short, François Brault 1987 – co-producer with Gilles Lenoir and Raymond Gauthier
- La Statuaire de cire – documentary short, François Brault 1987 – co-producer with Gilles Lenoir and Raymond Gauthier
- Un trésor de la peinture sacrée au Québec: la collection des abbés Desjardins – documentary short, François Brault 1987 – co-producer with Gilles Lenoir and Raymond Gauthier

== Awards ==
Fishermen (1959)

- South African International Film Festival, Bloemfontein: First Prize, Documentary, 1960
- International Agricultural Film Competition, Berlin: Third Prize – Bronze Ear of Grain, 1960
- Columbus International Film & Animation Festival, Columbus, Ohio: Chris Certificate, 1960

Roughnecks: The Story of Oil Drillers (1960)

- San Sebastián International Film Festival, San Sebastián: First Prize, 1960
- Golden Gate International Film Festival, San Francisco: Silver Plaque for Best Industrial Film, 1960
- International Industrial Film Festival, Turin: First Prize in Category, 1961
- Columbus International Film & Animation Festival, Columbus, Ohio: Chris Certificate, Business and Industry, General Information for Public, 1961
- Yorkton Film Festival, Yorkton: First Prize, Industry and Agriculture, 1962
- HEMISFILM, San Antonio TX: Best Film, 1972

Cattle Ranch (1961)

- Locarno Film Festival, Locarno: Diploma of Honour, 1961
- Vancouver International Film Festival, Vancouver: Honourable Mention, Science and Agriculture, 1961
- International Festival of Films for Television, Rome: First Prize, Gold Plaque, Documentary, 1963
- Congrès du spectacle, Montreal: Best Documentary, 1966

Kindergarten (1962)

- International Filmfestival Mannheim-Heidelberg, Mannheim: Special Mention of the International Jury, 1963
- International Educational Film Festival, Tehran: Bronze Delfan, Third Prize, Educational Films, 1964

An Essay on Science (1964)

- International Industrial Film Festival, London: Third Prize, General Information, 1964
- Australian and New Zealand Association for the Advancement of Science (ANZAAS), Sydney: Special Mention, 1964
- International Exhibition of Scientific Film, Buenos Aires: Diploma of Honor, 1966

Chantal: en vrac (1967)

- Montreal International Film Festival, Montreal: First Prize, medium-length films, 1967

Acadia Acadia?!? (1971)

- Festival international du film d'expression française, Dinard, France: L'Émeraude de Dinard – Festival's Grand Prize, 1971

Discussions in Bioethics: The Old Woman (1986)

- Festival Québécois de l'audiovisuel, Montreal: Certificate of Merit, Government Film, 1987

J'ai pas dit mon dernier mot (1986)

- Rendez-vous Québec Cinéma, Montreal: Special mention of the Quebec Association of Film Critics, 1987
