= Arthur Lipsett =

Canadian collage filmmaker

- Arthur Lipsett in the 1960s
- Born: Arthur Harold Lipsett; May 13, 1936; Montreal, Quebec, Canada
- Died: May 1, 1986 (aged 49); Montreal, Quebec, Canada
- Occupations: Film director Film editor Animator
- Years active: 1958–1978

Arthur Lipsett (May 13, 1936 – May 1, 1986) was a Canadian filmmaker with the National Film Board of Canada. His short, avant-garde collage films, which he described as "neither underground nor conventional”, contain elements of narrative, documentary, experimental collage, and visual essay. His first film, Very Nice, Very Nice, was nominated for an Academy Award.

== Early life ==
Lipsett was born in Montreal into a Jewish family. His father was a chemist, his mother was an immigrant from Kyiv who committed suicide in front of Arthur when he was 10. His father remarried without consulting Arthur and his daughter, Marian. Lipsett's teachers recognized him as gifted at age 8 and, after graduating from West Hill High School, he went to the School of Fine Arts in Montreal, where he was named 'best student' three times. His mentor, Group of Seven member Arthur Lismer, recommended him to the National Film Board of Canada (NFB).

== Career ==
Lipsett joined the NFB in 1958 as an editor in the animation department. While he is not credited, two of his earliest projects were as a cameraman on À St-Henri le cinq septembre (Hubert Aquin, 1962) and as a post-production advisor on the 1961 film Wrestling.

== Very Nice, Very Nice and Stanley Kubrick ==
Lipsett's particular passion was sound. He collected pieces of sound from a variety of sources, including garbage bins, and fitted them together to create interesting auditory sensations. After playing one such creation to friends, they suggested that Lipsett combine images with the sound collage. The result was his first short film, a 7-minute film Very Nice, Very Nice which was nominated for the Academy Award for Best Short Subject, Live Action Subjects in 1962. Despite not winning the Oscar, the film brought Lipsett considerable praise from critics and directors. Stanley Kubrick was one of Lipsett's fans, writing him to say that the film was "the most imaginative and brilliant uses of the movie screen and soundtrack that I have ever seen." Kubrick also asked him to create a trailer for his upcoming movie Dr. Strangelove. Lipsett declined Kubrick's offer. Kubrick went on to direct the trailer himself; however, Lipsett's influence on Kubrick is clearly visible in the released trailer.

== 21-87 and George Lucas ==
Lipsett's meticulous editing and combination of audio and visual montage was both groundbreaking and influential. His 1963 film 21-87 had a profound influence on director George Lucas, who said it was "the kind of movie I wanted to make — a very off the wall, abstract kind of film." Lucas used thematic approaches from 21–87 in THX 1138, his Star Wars films and American Graffiti, stating that his use of the term "The Force" in Star Wars was "an echo of that phrase in 21-87". Lucas never met Lipsett, but tributes to 21–87 appear in several places in Star Wars, e.g. the holding cell of Princess Leia in Star Wars Episode IV: A New Hope on the Death Star is cell No. 2187.

== A Trip Down Memory Lane ==
In 1965, Lipsett completed A Trip Down Memory Lane, which used newsreel footage from a fifty-year period, and was intended as a kind of cinematic time capsule. The film won the Lion of St. Mark at the Venice Film Festival.

== Mental illness and death ==
By 1970, Lipsett's mental health had deteriorated to the point where he was forced to resign, citing a phobia of film tape and a loss of creativity. In 1978, he briefly returned to the NFB but, by then, he was chaining up his editing equipment, wearing winter coats in summer and taping his fingers into the Buddhist mantra position for protection from phantom voices. In 1982, he was diagnosed with schizophrenia. After numerous suicide attempts, which he called “little experiments”, he took his own life on May 1, 1986. He was survived by his partner, artist Judith Sandiford.

== Works about Lipsett ==
In 2006, a feature-length documentary about Lipsett, Remembering Arthur, was produced by Public Pictures in association with the NFB, Bravo! and TVOntario. The Arthur Lipsett Project: A Dot on the Histomap is a 2007 NFB documentary directed by Eric Gaucher. In 2010, the NFB produced the short animated documentary Lipsett Diaries, directed by Theodore Ushev and written by Chris Robinson. In 2012, Amelia Does, a consulting producer on Remembering Arthur, published the biography Do Not Look Away: The Life of Arthur Lipsett.

== Legacy ==
In 2014, the Prism Prize inaugurated the Arthur Lipsett Award "for innovative and unique approaches to music video art".

== Filmography ==
All for the National Film Board of Canada

- Men Against the Ice - animated short, David Bairstow 1960 - animator
- Hors-d'oeuvre - animated collection, 1960 - animator, director
- La Conquête de la liberté – documentary short, James Beveridge and Marcel Martin 1961 – co-animator with Pierre L'Amare and Roy Nolan
- Les femmes parmi nous - La dignité – documentary short, Jacques Bobet 1961 - co-animator with Evelyn Lambart
- Les femmes parmi nous - Le bonheur – documentary short, Jacques Bobet 1961 - co-animator with Evelyn Lambart
- Very Nice, Very Nice - short film, 1961 - editor, director
- Collèges Classiques in Quebec - documentary short, Pierre Patry, 1961 - co-editor with Robert Verrall
- 21-87 - documentary short, 1963 - editor, director
- Experimental Film - documentary short, 1963 - editor, director
- Free Fall - documentary short, 1964 - editor, sound editor, cinematographer, director
- Animals and Psychology - documentary short, 1965 - director
- Fear and Horror - documentary short, 1965 - director
- Animal Altruism - documentary short, 1965 - director
- A Trip Down Memory Lane - documentary short, 1965 - editor, producer, director
- Perceptual Learning - documentary short, 1965 - director
- The Puzzle of Pain - documentary short, 1965 - director
- Regards sur l'occultisme - Magie et Miracles – documentary, Guy L. Coté 1965 – co-editor with Guy L. Coté
- Regards sur l'occultisme - Science et esprits – documentary, Guy L. Coté 1965 – co-editor with Guy L. Coté
- The Continuing Past - documentary short, Stephen Ford 1966 - editor
- The Invention of the Adolescent - documentary short, Patricia Watson 1967 - editor, animator
- North - documentary short, Josef Reeve 1968 - editor
- Imperial North - documentary short, Josef Reeve 1968 - editor
- Fluxes - documentary short, 1968 - editor, sound editor, director
- Data for Decision - documentary short, David Millar, 1968 - editor
- N-Zone - experimental film, 1970 - writer, editor, cinematographer, director

== Awards ==
Very Nice, Very Nice (1961)

- 34th Academy Awards, Los Angeles: Nominee, Academy Award for Best Live Action Short Film, 1962

21-87 (1963)

- Ann Arbor Film Festival, Ann Arbor, Michigan: First Prize, 1964
- Palo Alto Filmmakers’ Festival, Palo Alto: Second Prize, 1964
- Midwest Film Festival, University of Chicago, Chicago: Most Popular Film, 1964

Free Fall (1964)

- Golden Gate International Film Festival, San Francisco: Award of Merit, 1964
- Montreal International Film Festival, Montreal: Honorable Mention, Shorts, 1964

A Trip Down Memory Lane (1965)

- Venice Film Festival, Venice, Italy: Plaque of the Lion of St. Mark, Teledocumentary, 1966
- Golden Gate International Film Festival, San Francisco: Certificate of Motion Picture Excellence, 1966

Fluxes (1968)

- Chicago International Film Festival, Chicago: Certificate of Merit, 1969
