= 24 heures ou plus =

- Directed by: Gilles Groulx
- Written by: Gilles Groulx; Jean-Marc Piotte
- Produced by: Paul Larose
- Narrated by: Jean-Marc Piotte
- Cinematography: Guy Borremans; Serge Giguère
- Edited by: Gilles Groulx; Jacques Kasma
- Music by: Offenbach
- Distributed by: National Film Board of Canada
- Release date: February 10, 1977
- Running time: 113 minutes
- Country: Canada
- Language: French

24 heures ou plus (also written as 24 heures ou plus... or Vingt-quatre heures ou plus...) is a radical political documentary about Quebec society, shot in 1971 and completed by director by Gilles Groulx by mid-January 1973. However, the film was initially suppressed by producer National Film Board of Canada and not released until February 1977.

== Synopsis ==
A Marxist critique of the capitalist system, Gilles Groulx filmed Quebec society as he saw it in the fall of 1971. Shot only a year after the events of October 1970, while Quebec was still in turmoil, the film denounces the alienation of the masses and exalts the optimistic progressives who want to awaken the people of Quebec to their cultural and political oppression.

Alternating between colour and black and white, the film combines actuality footage, graffiti, didactic texts, live sequences, various interviews, newspaper articles and television extracts, edited into a structure whose form and commentary offer both an analysis of society and the necessity and hope of social change. The political analysis made by Groulx and the political scientist/narrator Jean-Marc Piotte testifies to an unequivocal desire to make a real film of confrontation.

== Production and release ==
The film was originally titled 1461 jours, but was changed to 24 heures ou plus following a call for a twenty-four hour general strike by unions in Quebec. National Film Board of Canada Commissioner Sydney Newman halted production on the movie and made efforts to prevent bootleg recordings from spreading. In 1973, Gilles Groulx stated that he would not alter the film. The NFB's Board of Governors considered suing him for violating his contract, but chose not to. The film was officially cancelled in June 1973, and Groulx offered to buy its rights, but was denied. The ban was lifted in 1976. The film received a "for all" rating from the Bureau de surveillance du cinéma on February 8, 1977, and was shown for the first time on February 10 at the Cinémathèque québécoise.

== Works cited ==
- Evans, Gary (1991). In the National Interest: A Chronicle of the National Film Board of Canada from 1949 to 1989. University of Toronto Press. ISBN 0802027849.
