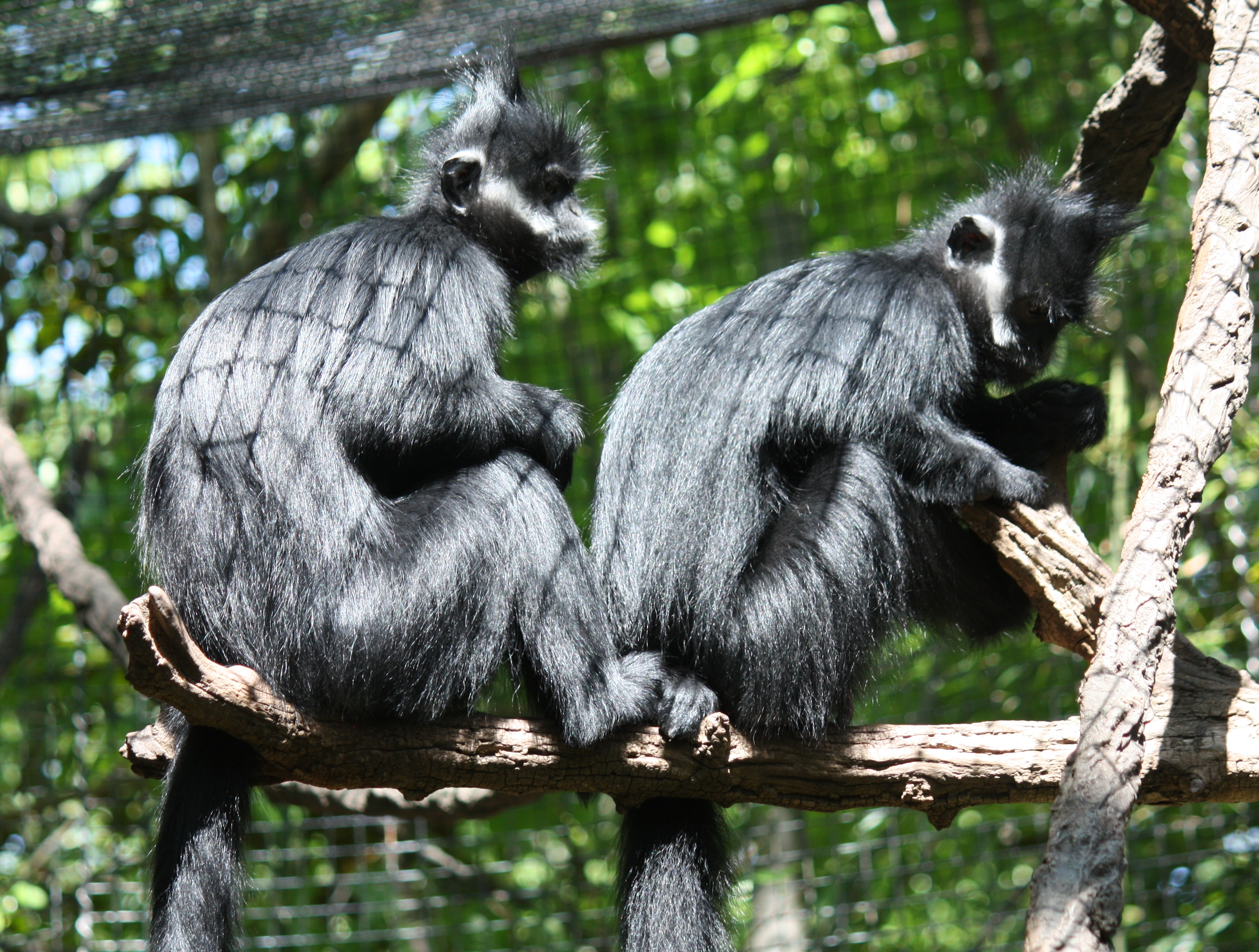
- François' langurs at the Cincinnati Zoo

Conservation status
- Endangered (IUCN 3.1)

Scientific classification
- Kingdom: Animalia
- Phylum: Chordata
- Class: Mammalia
- Infraclass: Placentalia
- Order: Primates
- Family: Cercopithecidae
- Genus: Trachypithecus
- Species group: Trachypithecus francoisi group
- Species: T. francoisi

Binomial name
- Trachypithecus francoisi (de Pousargues, 1898)
- Geographic range

= François' langur =

Species of Old World monkey

François' langur (Trachypithecus francoisi), also known as Francois' leaf monkey, the Tonkin leaf monkey, or the white side-burned black langur is a species of Old World monkey and the type species of its species group. It is one of the least studied of the species belonging to the Colobinae subfamily.

The species is distributed from Southwestern China to northeastern Vietnam. The total number of wild individuals is unknown, but fewer than 500 are believed to be left in Vietnam and 1,400–1,650 in China. About 60 langurs are in captivity in North American zoos. The species is named after Auguste François (1857–1935), who was the French Consul at Lungchow in southern China.

== Physical description ==
François' langur is a medium-sized primate with black, silky hair. It has very distinct white sideburns that grow down from its ears to the corners of its cheeks. A morphological specialization of François' langur is its complex stomach, made up of four separate chambers. This is a necessary adaptation for the digestion of its folivorous diet.

This species shows sexual dimorphism in its size. Males have a head-body length of 55–64 cm (22–25 in), while females are only 47–59 cm (19–23 in) in length. Males likewise have longer tails of 82–96 cm (32–38 in) compared to the 74–89 cm (29–35 in) for females. Males are significantly heavier than females, weighing 6.5–7.2 kg (14–16 lb) compared to 5.5–5.9 kg (12–13 lb) for females. Infants weigh 0.45–0.50 kg (16–18 oz) at birth.

Infants are born with bright orange coloured fur, which fades to black throughout the period of infancy lasting several months. It is not known why their coats are so conspicuous, but current hypotheses suggest it may elicit attention, protection and caregiving by adults.

François' langur has large salivary glands to begin the digestion of tough leaf fibers. A more notable evolutionary adaptation seen in this langur is the sacculated stomach with two chambers. In the upper chamber, bacteria help to continue the breakdown of fibers started by the saliva. The upper chamber has a relatively normal pH, to create favorable conditions for bacterial growth. The lower chamber is similar to that of other mammals, in that it contains the acids that finish the breakdown of food components.

== Behavior ==
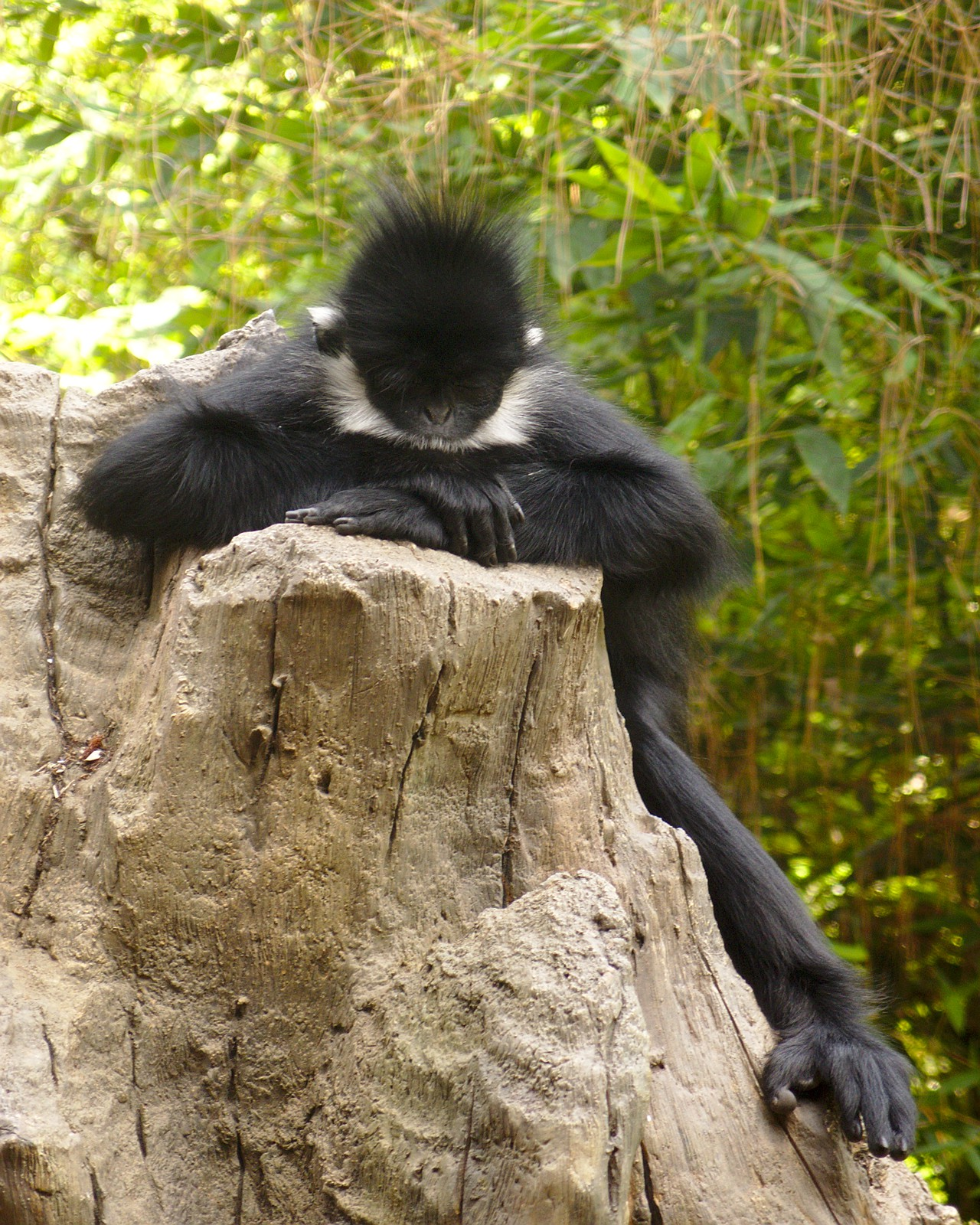
T. francoisi relaxing on a stump at the Los Angeles Zoo

François' langur is diurnal and spends most of the day resting and foraging. One study investigated time distribution across activities in a disturbed environment, showing resting 35.41%, foraging 31.67%, traveling 14.44%, huddling 9.61%, playing 8.54%, and grooming 0.33%. Traveling, playing, grooming and huddling are more dependent on the season. Grooming has been found to occur in all seasons but spring. François' langur spends a greater part of its day travelling during the winter (20.12%) and huddling in the spring (14.62%).

François' langur lives in groups of 4 to 27 langurs, but will usually be found in groups around 12. It lives in a matriarchal society where the females lead the group. Within the society, the females share parenting responsibilities with one another, and are philopatric to the group. Males within the group take no part in the raising of the young, and the young males leave the group before reaching sexual maturity. Young langurs are nursed up to two years before being weaned, and once weaned, the relationship amongst the relatives becomes that of any other member of a given group.

Over 50% of François' langur's diet is made up of leaves. It also consumes fruits (17.2%), seeds (14.2%), flowers, stems, roots, bark, and occasionally minerals and insects from rock surfaces and cliffs. This langur consumes its favorite food, young leaves, at the highest rate during the dry season, April through September; between October and March when young leaves are less common, the langur supplements its diet with seeds, petioles, and stems.

François' langur is selective in its diet, in Nonggang Nature Reserve, China, it primarily eats the young leaves of 10 different species of plants, only two of which are common within the reserve. Its diet includes Pithecellobium clypearia, Ficus nervosa, Garcinia pauncinervis, Sinosideroxylon pedunculatum, F. microcarpa, Miliusa chunni, Securidaca inappendiculata, Bauhinia sp., and Canthium dicoccum. Though these are the preferred plant species, it still consumes other plant species opportunistically. Another study on François' langur in a fragmented habitat found that it preferred on just four plant species: litse, Litsea glutinosa; seatung, Pittosporum glabratum; Cipadessa cinerascens; and Chinese desmos, Desmos chinensis. The study showed that the langur spent 61.6% of its feeding time on these four plant species, and 38.4% of its time on 36 other known species.

== Habitat and distribution ==
The preferred habitat of François' langur is a karst topography; limestone cliffs and caves of tropical and subtropical zones. By living on these limestone cliffs, the langur is at an advantage when it comes to sleeping arrangements. It sleeps either on ledges or in caves, with its preference being in the cave. François' langur has also been known to find sleeping sites in areas where the terrain is above 60 °F (16 °C), within evergreen forests. By living and sleeping in these limestone caves and cliffs, far from flat land, the langur has greatly reduced its rate of predation. It exhibits cryptic behavior and becomes very vigilant upon entry to the cave for final resting as a tactic to avoid any predators. In addition, it demonstrates a loud call to declare its territorial spacing. François' langur also chooses its sleeping habitat depending upon foraging availability. It chooses sleeping sites that are close to potential foraging sites, to conserve energy and reduce travel costs. Sleeping sites are not located in the heart of foraging sites, but are within reasonable proximity, as the preferred nesting and foraging sites do not completely line up with one another. When it does go to forage, it tends to travel along the same route and returns to the same sleeping site consecutive nights to avoid predation. François' langur has been known to have approximately 6–10 regularly used sleeping sites that are used at various points throughout the year as water and food resources fluctuate.

François' langur has a restricted range of areas in which it can inhabit. It is primarily found in Southwest China and northern Vietnam. The majority of scientific studies of François' langur in the wild take place in the Nonggang Nature Reserve and the Fusui Nature Reserve in Guangxi Province, China. The average home range size of this species is 19 hectares (230,000 yd^{2}) and its day range size is 341–577 square metres (3,670–6,210 ft^{2}). In general, the low quality of its folivorous diet leads to nutritional stress, a smaller home range size and reduced daily travel time. The largest group of langurs reported numbered 500–600 individuals, and was found in the Mayanghe National Nature Reserve. The average group size ranges from four to 27. The Fusui Nature Reserve reported in 2009 that François' langur population had declined 73% in the previous five years, thus lessening their distribution even more. Recent census numbers have concluded it is now limited to 14 localities in 10 different counties.

== Conservation status ==
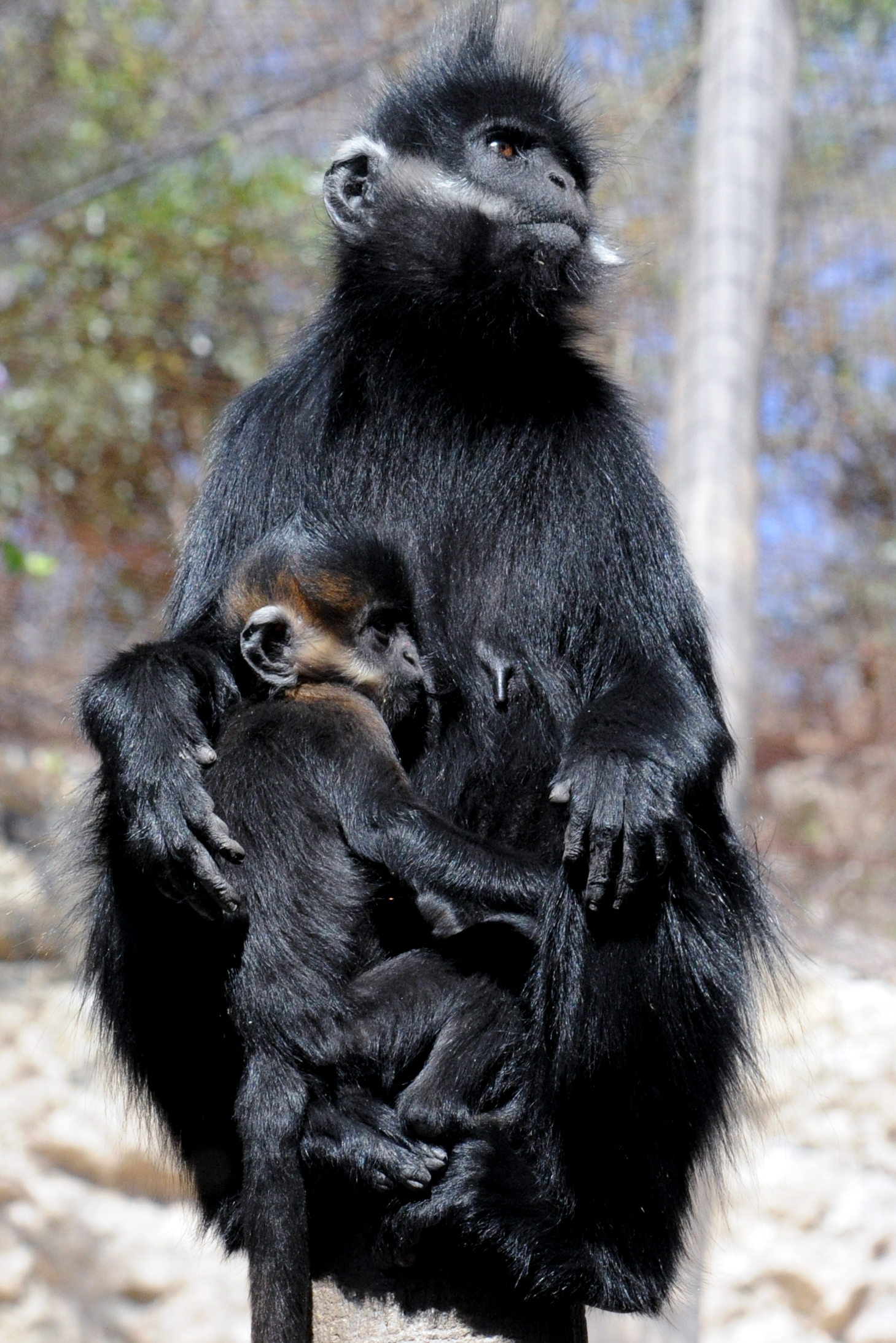
François' langur at the San Antonio Zoo and Aquarium

The population of François' langur has been on a steady decline for the past 30 years. Of the many factors threatening their survival today, hunting has had one of the largest impacts. In Nonggang, where it is most prevalent, the natives believe that the langur has medicinal values, and have hunted them to make wine out of their bones, which they believe could cure fatigue and rheumatism. In Guangxi province, an estimated 90% decline in numbers has occurred since the 1980s; a 2002–2003 survey found 307 individuals in 14 populations remained. In 1983, the estimated population of François' langur was 4,000–5,000. In the 1970s, hunting records recorded more than 1,400 langurs killed and in the 1980s more than 1,500 were killed.

Another threat to François' langur is the destruction of its habitat. The langur lives on limestone cliffs, and when farmers look to cultivate their land, they light fires on the lower slopes. Limestone is particularly susceptible to fire; therefore, this practice not only destroys its habitats, but also causes major food shortages for the langur because its diet is primarily foliage. The primary predators of François' langur are both terrestrial and aerial. The clouded leopard is a potential predator, but its numbers are low enough that it is not the langur's greatest threat. Aerial predators such as the crested serpent eagle and the mountain hawk-eagle are a greater threat to François' langurs of Nonggang, especially to their young.

Despite the extreme and continuing decline in the Francois' langur population, the actions being taken towards the conservation of this species and its habitat are still somewhat minimal. Its current population size is less than 2,500 individuals. A plan to protect the forest and ban hunting, called the Conservation Action Plan, was drafted in 1996, but has yet to be implemented. To protect the langur, not only does protection from hunting need to be implemented, but its habitats must be protected as well. In 2003, the National Forestry Bureau acknowledged the rapid decline in François' langur and agreed to increase law enforcement in this area to help protect them from hunters. In addition, the Asia Developmental Bank has begun helping the residents who live in close proximity to langur habitats build biogas facilities to reduce the fuel wood collection, thus possibly reducing the number of fires. Finally, a current project is underway by the Global Environmental facility to protect the Nonggang National and Dmingshan Natural Reserves and the langurs living within.
