= Games of the XXI Olympiad (film) =

1977 Canadian documentary film

- French: Jeux de la XXIème olympiade
- Directed by: Jean Beaudin; Marcel Carrière; Georges Dufaux; Jean-Claude Labrecque
- Written by: Georges Seltzer
- Produced by: Jacques Bobet
- Narrated by: Georges Seltzer
- Cinematography: Pierre Letarte; Pierre Mignot
- Edited by: François Labonté; Claude Langlois; Werner Nold; Alain Sauvé
- Music by: André Gagnon; Art Phillips; Vic Vogel
- Production company: National Film Board of Canada
- Release date: April 21, 1977
- Running time: 118 minutes
- Country: Canada
- Language: French
- Budget: $1.37 million

Games of the XXI Olympiad (French: Jeux de la XXIème olympiade) is a Canadian documentary film, directed by Jean Beaudin, Marcel Carrière, Georges Dufaux and Jean-Claude Labrecque and released in 1977. The film compiles highlights of the 1976 Summer Olympics in Montreal, Quebec.

The film's 168-member crew shot 100 kilometres of film. The film had a budget of $1.37 million (equivalent to $7,233,248 in 2025) with $470,000 (equivalent to $2,481,479 in 2025) coming from the NFB.

The film premiered at the National Film Board theatre in Montreal on April 21, 1977, before receiving a television broadcast on May 29 on both CBC Television in English and Télévision de Radio-Canada in French.

The film received a Canadian Film Award nomination for Best Feature Length Documentary at the 28th Canadian Film Awards in 1977.

== Works cited ==
- Evans, Gary (1991). In the National Interest: A Chronicle of the National Film Board of Canada from 1949 to 1989. University of Toronto Press. ISBN 0802027849.
