= Pour la suite du monde =

1963 film

- Title card
- Directed by: Michel Brault; Marcel Carrière; Pierre Perrault
- Written by: Michel Brault; Pierre Perrault
- Produced by: Fernand Dansereau; Jacques Bobet
- Narrated by: Stanley Jackson
- Cinematography: Michel Brault; Bernard Gosselin
- Edited by: Werner Nold
- Distributed by: National Film Board of Canada
- Release date: August 4, 1963
- Running time: 105 minutes
- Country: Canada
- Language: French
- Budget: $80,000

Pour la suite du monde (French pronunciation: [puʁ la sɥit dy mɔ̃d], transl. "So That the World May Go On", also known as Of Whales, the Moon, and Men; For Those Who Will Follow, and The Moontrap in English) is a 1963 Canadian documentary film produced by the National Film Board of Canada and directed by Michel Brault, Marcel Carrière and Pierre Perrault. It is the first of Perrault's Isle-aux-Coudres Trilogy, followed by The Times That Are (Le règne du jour) in 1967, and The River Schooners (Les voitures d'eau) in 1968.

== Synopsis ==
The film is a work of ethnofiction. It shows life in a small isolated community, when the influence of the Catholic Church in Quebec was still strong.

For centuries the inhabitants of Isle-aux-Coudres, a small island in the St. Lawrence River, trapped beluga whales by sinking a weir of saplings into the offshore mud at low tide. After 1920, the practice was abandoned. In 1962, a team of National Film Board of Canada filmmakers led by director Perrault and cinematographer Brault arrived on the island to make a cinéma-vérité documentary about the people and their isolated life. They encouraged the islanders to revive the practice of beluga fishing. The live animal they caught was then driven on a truck to an aquarium in New York City.

The film also shows the daily life of the islanders, and their celebrations, such as the festival at mid-Lent (mi-carême).

== Cast ==
- Léopold Tremblay as Marchand and president of the new beluga fishing co.
- Alexis Tremblay as Cultivateur et politicien
- Abel Harvey as Capitaine et maître de pêche
- Louis Harvey as Cultivateur et chantre d'église
- Joachim Harvey as Capitaine du Nord de l'Île
- Stanley Jackson as Narrator

== Production ==
The film was shot in L'Isle-aux-Coudres and New York between 1961 and 1962, on a budget of $80,000 (equivalent to $826,164 in 2025).

== Alternate English versions and titles ==
The film has been screened in various versions and with no less than four English-language titles. At its 1963 Cannes premiere, it was billed as For Those Who Will Follow. The NFB has also promoted the film in English as Of Whales, the Moon and Men or The Moontrap, depending upon whether it was the 105-minute or 84-minute version, respectively. The release of a 2007 "Île-aux-Coudres Trilogy" DVD trilogy also translates the film title as For the Ones to Come.

The film is commonly referred to simply as Pour la suite du monde in both French and English.

== Reception ==
The film premiered at the Loew's International Film Festival on 4 August 1963. It was hugely popular in Quebec, and today is recognized as a classic of Canadian cinema. Pour la suite du monde has been consistently ranked by critics as one of the best ever made and it represents a major development in the direct cinema movement, moving away from simple observation to a more immediate participation and a great emphasis on the words of the people portrayed.

It was the first Canadian film to be shown at competition at the Cannes Film Festival. It was also the first Quebec film shown at the festival.

Quebecois filmmaker Denis Villeneuve declares that Perrault's "Île-aux-Coudres Trilogy" is "amongst the most beautiful films he has ever seen". It remains a major source of inspiration and influence for him.

== Accolades ==
Award	Date of ceremony	Category	Recipient(s)	Result	Ref.
Canadian Film Awards	8 May 1964	Film of the Year	Pour la suite du monde	Won	

== Awards ==
- Ibero-American-Filipino Documentary Film Contest, Bilbao, Spain: First Prize, Gold Medal, 1963
- Évreux International Short Film Festival, Évreux, France: Grand Prize, Golden Viking, 1964
- Columbus International Film & Animation Festival, Columbus, Ohio: Chris Award, First Prize 1966
- Melbourne Film Festival, Melbourne: Diploma of Merit, 1966
- Sardinia International Ethnographic Film Festival, Nuoro, Italy: Special Mention, 1994
- Toronto International Film Festival, Toronto: Canada's Ten-Best Films, 8th Place, 1984

== See also ==
- Docufiction
- List of docufiction films
- Man of Aran, a 1934 film centred around reviving a shark fishing tradition

== Works cited ==
- Melnyk, George (2004). One Hundred Years of Canadian Cinema. University of Toronto Press. ISBN 080203568X.
- Pallister, Janis (1995). The Cinema of Quebec: Masters in Their Own House. Associated University Presses. ISBN 0838635628.
- Turner, D. John, ed. (1987). Canadian Feature Film Index: 1913-1985. Canadian Film Institute. ISBN 0660533642.
