= St. Lawrence North =

Canadian documentary television series

- Genre: Documentary
- Written by: Pierre Perrault; Judith Crawley
- Directed by: Rene Bonniere; Pierre Perrault
- Narrated by: Lloyd Bochner; Donald David (2 episodes)
- Composer: Larry Crosley
- Country of origin: Canada
- Original language: English
- No. of seasons: 1
- No. of episodes: 13

Production
- Producer: Pierre Perrault
- Editor: Rene Bonniere
- Running time: 30 minutes
- Production companies: National Film Board of Canada; Crawley Films

Original release
- Network: CBC Television
- Release: 2 July – 24 September 1960

St. Lawrence North is a Canadian documentary television series that first aired on CBC Television. It was produced by the National Film Board of Canada, which contracted Crawley Films to produce the English version. The first nine episodes aired in 1960; four films produced in 1963 were added and it was released as a full documentary in 1998.

== Premise ==
This series of documentaries concerns the life and land north of the Saint Lawrence River, particularly in northern Quebec and Labrador. Topics include hunting, First Nations lifestyles and the effects of industries such as mining in this region.

== Scheduling ==
This half-hour series was first broadcast on Saturdays at 5:00 p.m. from 2 July to 24 September 1960. It was rebroadcast at various times throughout the 1960s.

== Episodes ==
- Canadian Diamonds (1960)
- Ka Ke Ki Ku (1960)
- The Land of Jacques Cartier (1960)
- On the Sea (1960)
- Soirée at St. Hilarion (1960)
- Three Seasons (1960)
- Turlutte (1960)
- White-Whale Hunters of Anse-Aux-Basques(1960)
- Winter Crossing at L'Isle-Aux-Coudres (1960)
- Attiuk (1963)
- The Jean Richard (1963)
- Whalehead (1963)
- Winter Sealing at La Tabatière (1963)

== Reception ==
St. Lawrence North was sold to broadcasters in Australia, Italy and West Germany.
