= The Shimmering Beast =

1982 film

- French: La bête lumineuse
- Directed by: Pierre Perrault
- Produced by: Jacques Bobet
- Cinematography: Martin Leclerc
- Edited by: Suzanne Allard
- Distributed by: National Film Board of Canada
- Release date: 15 October 1982
- Running time: 128 minutes
- Country: Canada
- Language: French

The Shimmering Beast (French: La bête lumineuse) is a 1982 Canadian documentary film produced by the National Film Board of Canada and directed by Pierre Perrault. It is about a group of hunters who gather annually to hunt moose near Maniwaki, Quebec. It was screened in the Un Certain Regard section at the 1983 Cannes Film Festival.

== Cast ==
- Louis-Philippe Lécuyer as Canotier
- Philippe Cross as Canotier
- Stéphane-Albert Boulais as Archer
- Maurice Chaillot as Archer
- Bernard L'Heureux as Orignal
- Michel Guyot as Orignal
- Maurice Aumont as Chasseur d'ours
- Claude Lauriault as Chasseur d'ours
