= The Christmas Martian =

- Original film poster
- French: Le Martien de Noël
- Directed by: Bernard Gosselin
- Written by: Roch Carrier
- Produced by: Rock Demers
- Starring: Marcel Sabourin
- Cinematography: Alain Dostie
- Edited by: André Corriveau
- Music by: Jacques Perron
- Production companies: Faroun Films; Les Cinéastes Associés
- Release date: 1971
- Running time: 65 minutes
- Country: Canada
- Language: French

The Christmas Martian (French: Le Martien de Noël) is a Canadian children's Christmas comedy film, directed by Bernard Gosselin and released in 1971. The film stars Marcel Sabourin as Poo Flower, an extraterrestrial being from Mars who lands his spaceship near a small town in Northern Quebec during the Christmas season, befriending the local children but alarming their parents.

The film's cast also includes Catherine Leduc, François Gosselin, Guy L'Écuyer, Roland Chenail, Paul Hébert, Louise Poulin-Roy, Paul Berval, Ernest Guimond, Yvan Canuel, Yvon Leroux and Reine Malo, as well as narration by Marc-André Coallier.

It was the first children's film ever made in Canada by a commercial studio independently of either the National Film Board of Canada or the Canadian Broadcasting Corporation. After producer Rock Demers launched the Tales for All series of children's films in the 1980s, the film was retroactively incorporated into that series.

== Reception ==
Canuxploitation, a film blog devoted to Canadian B-movies, wrote that the film was "easily the most insane example of Canadian children's cinema ever conceived. Nonsensical and embarrassingly low-budget, Le Martien de Noël wildly bounces from wacky action sequences to unrelated tangents, all highlighted by special effects even the most distracted seven year-old could see through. In other words, it's great!".

== Availability ==
The film has occasionally been rebroadcast on television during the Christmas season, most commonly on science fiction channels. RiffTrax released a version with a mocking audio commentary track on December 15, 2023.

== See also ==
- List of Christmas films
