= Istituto superiore regionale etnografico =

The Istituto superiore regionale etnografico (ISRE; English: Sardinian Regional Institute of Ethnography) is an institution based in Nuoro (Sardinia), established in 1972 by the Regional Council of Sardinia.

== Short story ==
The institution was established concurrently with the centenary of the birth of the writer Grazia Deledda, to promote the ''study and documentation of the social and cultural life of Sardinia in its traditional manifestations and its transformations, as set out in article 1 of the by-laws.

The newborn Institute was added to the pre-existing "Museo del costume di Nuoro", which was renamed "Museo della vita e delle tradizioni popolari sarde" (Museum of Sardinian Folk Life and Traditions). In 1978 the municipality of Nuoro ceded to ISRE the house of Grazia Deledda and the institute set up the Museo Deleddiano which was opened to the public in 1983.

On July 20, 2023, the new "Museo della Ceramica" (Museum of Ceramics) was inaugurated within the premises of the historic Casa Chironi, donated to the institute by the Municipality of Nuoro.

== Functions and activities ==
ISRE currently manages a range of public and private facilities, libraries and collections. Among these:

- the demo-ethno-anthropological library and the editorial activities and the management of the Museo deleddiano in Nuoro, including the Deledda Fund
- The Luigi Cocco Collection located inside the Cittadella dei Musei in Cagliari.
- The Cineteca and the Photographic Archive of visual anthropology that consists of films made and / or produced by the Institute itself, containing studies and documentation related to the popular life of Sardinia and works that are sent to the Sardinia International Ethnographic Film Festival, docufilm coming from Worldwide.
- The photo library that collects over 40,000 images on Sardinia, among the main collections are the funds Giuseppe Costa, Piero Pirari, Giulio Pili, Wolfgang Suschitzky, Jean Dieuzaide, Pablo Volta. These materials are a considerable part of the digital library Sardegna Digital Library
- The library specialized in the collection of demo-ethno-anthropological documentation. The library is currently about 24,000 titles for monographic publications and over 1,000 titles related to magazines. The library is part of the circuit of the Sardinian Regional System SBN (National Library Service); therefore, the OPAC catalog of a large part of the book heritage is available on the internet.

== Ethnographic festivals ==
- The Sardinia International Ethnographic Film Festival (SIEFF), born in 1982, a biennial international festival on the international productions of ethnographic cinema, which is hosted at the Auditorium of the Ethnographic Museum. The films come from all over the world and the prizes are awarded by an international jury.
- The Festival Biennale Italiano dell’Etnografia (ETNU) (Italian Biennial Festival of Ethnography), established in 2007, which hosts exhibitions of ethnography, craft and design, conferences, workshops, concerts, film screenings, book presentations and more.
