= Sardegna Digital Library =

The Sardegna Digital Library (SDL) is an online digital library created and managed by the Council of the Sardinia Region. The site was designed and created during the period when it was governor of the Sardinia region Renato Soru, and was put online in April 2008. The library is made up of multimedia materials designed to represent Sardinia in its many aspects: cultural, historical, artistic, landscape and environmental. The Digital Library is a portal containing a constantly updated archive of digital contents of the Sardinia Region. For the first time, an institution makes available online a consistent variety of cataloged multimedia documents. The contents come from the regional thematic sites and from Italian national archives: among these ISRE, Istituto Luce, Rai and from individual contributions by Sardinian authors.

At present, more than 33,000 images, 5,600 audio tracks, 2,000 videos and 2,600 publications are available for consultation. The contents, classified according to national and international archival and cataloging standards, are made available to users, in order to allow free and open consultation.

== Contents ==
The site collects and makes available to all the most significant contents of the Region's heritage; the thematic sites become a source and a partial exhibitors of the same contents of the Digital Library. Il portale contiene materiale e documentazione sulla Sardegna di vario genere: video, file audio, testi e immagini. L'archivio viene continuamente aggiornato con nuovi materiali provenienti dai siti tematici della Regione e con contributi di vari autori. The archive is divided into five sections: Videos, Images, Audio, Texts, Arguments. The site is also equipped with a web search engine capable of interrogating sections individually. All materials, audio, video, photographic have been digitized and can be used directly on the site in FLV and MP3 mode; they are also downloadable in podcast mode in WMV, iPod-MP4, MP3 formats.
