= Yvan Canuel =

Canadian actor

Yvan Canuel (April 8, 1935 – December 26, 1999) was a Canadian actor from Quebec. He was most noted for his role in the 1993 film La Florida, for which he was a Genie Award nominee for Best Supporting Actor at the 14th Genie Awards in 1993.

Originally from Mont-Joli, Quebec, he began his career as a radio actor in the 1950s, soon branching out into television roles. On television he was best known for his roles in the series Mont-Joye, Terre humaine, Duplessis, L'Héritage and Scoop; in film, his performances included The Christmas Martian, Taureau, J.A. Martin Photographer (J.A. Martin photographe) and The Alley Cat (Le Matou).

He was the husband of actress Lucille Papineau, and the father of actor Nicolas Canuel and filmmaker Érik Canuel.
