= A Trip Down Memory Lane =

1965 short film by Arthur Lipsett

- Directed by: Arthur Lipsett
- Produced by: Arthur Lipsett; Donald Brittain
- Edited by: Arthur Lipsett
- Production company: National Film Board of Canada
- Release date: 1965
- Running time: 12 minutes
- Country: Canada

A Trip Down Memory Lane is a 1965 experimental collage film by Arthur Lipsett, created by editing together images and sound clips from over 50 years of newsreel footage.

== Summary ==
The film was intended as an audiovisual tour of the post-war technocracy. In his notes for producer Donald Brittain about the film, Lipsett wrote that "as science grows, religious belief seems to have diminished... The new machines (of every description) are now invested with spiritual qualities. They have become ritualistic implements." Lipsett envisioned his film as a kind of cinematic time capsule for future generations, and sub-titled the film accordingly, as "Additional Material for a Time-Capsule."

A Trip Down Memory Lane combines footage from a beauty contest, religious procession, failed airflight, automotive and science experiments, animal experimentation, skyscraper construction, military paraphernalia, John D. Rockefeller and scenes of leisure, Richard Nixon and scenes of war, blimps and hot air balloons, and a sword swallower.

== Production ==
To create the film, Lipsett travelled from Montreal to New York City to obtain stock footage in 35mm which he had reduced to 16mm. He then drew new edge code on it by hand. Finally, he had it blown up to 35mm for release.

== Awards ==
- Venice Film Festival, Venice, Italy: Plaque of the Lion of St. Mark, Teledocumentary, 1966
- Golden Gate International Film Festival, San Francisco: Certificate of Motion Picture Excellence, 1966

== See also ==
- Technophobia
- Modernist film
