= The River Schooners =

- French: Les Voitures d'eau
- Directed by: Pierre Perrault
- Produced by: Jacques Bobet; Guy L. Coté
- Starring: Alexis Tremblay; Marie Tremblay
- Cinematography: Bernard Gosselin
- Edited by: Monique Fortier
- Production company: National Film Board of Canada
- Release date: 1968
- Running time: 110 minutes
- Country: Canada
- Language: French

The River Schooners (French: Les Voitures d'eau) is a 1968 Canadian documentary, produced by the National Film Board of Canada and directed by Pierre Perrault. The third and final film in his "Île-aux-Coudres Trilogy" after Pour la suite du monde and The Times That Are (Le règne du jour), the film portrays workers in L'Isle-aux-Coudres, Quebec, who are employed in the traditional but fading art of building wooden schooners.

The film was released theatrically in 1968. In 1972, it was screened at the Museum of Modern Art in New York City, as part of the New Cinema from Quebec program of 11 theatrical films from the province made between 1968 and 1971.

It was later screened at the 1984 Festival of Festivals as part of Front & Centre, a special retrospective program of artistically and culturally significant films in the history of Canadian cinema.

The three films in the trilogy were released as a DVD box set in 2007.
