= Very Nice, Very Nice =

1961 film by Arthur Lipsett

- Directed by: Arthur Lipsett
- Produced by: Tom Daly; Colin Low
- Edited by: Arthur Lipsett
- Distributed by: National Film Board of Canada
- Release date: 1961
- Running time: 7 minutes
- Country: Canada
- Language: English

Very Nice, Very Nice is a Canadian avant-garde collage film made by Arthur Lipsett in 1961, and produced by the National Film Board of Canada.

== Plot ==
Thoughts about the day-to-day life interpreted through snapshots and sound collages pondering if life is better than it was thirty years ago.

== Production ==
While working at the National Film Board, Lipsett collected pieces of audio from the waste bins and pieced them together as a hobby. When his friends heard the product of this they suggested that he add images to it. The result was this film.

== Reception ==
Very Nice, Very Nice was nominated for the Academy Award for Best Live Action Short Film at the 34th Academy Awards.

== Legacy ==
Stanley Kubrick praised Very Nice, Very Nice to Lipsett, describing it as "one of the most imaginative and brilliant uses of the movie screen and soundtrack that I have ever seen". Although Lipset declined Kubrick's invitation to create trailer for Dr. Strangelove, his influence remains clearly visible in the final trailer directed by Pablo Ferro.

By 1970, the film had 200 prints in circulation. It is often shown at film festivals and in film schools. American experimental filmmaker Stan Brakhage was given a copy of the film at one point.

== See also ==
- Modernist film
- Conformity
- United States in the 1950s
