= The Times That Are =

- French: Le règne du jour
- Directed by: Pierre Perrault
- Produced by: Jacques Bobet; Guy L. Coté
- Starring: Alexis Tremblay; Marie Tremblay
- Cinematography: Bernard Gosselin; Jean-Claude Labrecque
- Edited by: Yves Leduc
- Music by: Jean-Marie Cloutier
- Production company: National Film Board of Canada
- Release date: 12 August 1967
- Running time: 118 minutes
- Country: Canada
- Language: French

The Times That Are (French: Le règne du jour) is a 1967 Canadian documentary film, which was produced by the National Film Board of Canada and directed by Pierre Perrault. A sequel to his 1963 film Pour la suite du monde, the film follows Alexis Tremblay and his family on a trip to France to visit their ancestral roots in Normandy and Brittany.

The film was a Canadian Film Award finalist for Best Feature Film at the 20th Canadian Film Awards in 1968, but did not win, although Bernard Gosselin won the award for Best Black and White Cinematography and Serge Beauchemin and Alain Dostie won the Genie for Best Sound.

The Times That Are was followed in 1968 by The River Schooners (Les voitures d'eau), the final film of Perrault's Île-aux-Coudres Trilogy.

It was later screened at the 1984 Festival of Festivals as part of Front & Centre, a special retrospective program of artistically and culturally significant films in the history of Canadian cinema.
