= Bernie and the Gang =

- French: Ti-Mine, Bernie pis la gang...
- Directed by: Marcel Carrière
- Produced by: Marc Beaudet; Robert Forget
- Starring: Marcel Sabourin; Jean Lapointe
- Cinematography: Jean-Pierre Lachapelle
- Edited by: Werner Nold
- Music by: François Dompierre
- Production company: National Film Board of Canada
- Release date: January 13, 1977
- Running time: 124 minutes
- Country: Canada
- Language: French

Bernie and the Gang (French: Ti-Mine, Bernie pis la gang...) is a Canadian comedy-drama film, directed by Marcel Carrière and released in 1977. The film centres on two brothers, Ti-Mine (Marcel Sabourin) and Bernie (Jean Lapointe), who concoct a get-rich-quick scheme in the hope of moving their family to Florida.

The cast also includes Rita Lafontaine, Anne-Marie Ducharme, Raymond Lévesque, Denise Proulx and Guy L'Écuyer.
