= Golden Gloves (1961 film) =

1961 documentary directed by Gilles Groulx

- Directed by: Gilles Groulx
- Written by: Jean Le Moyne
- Produced by: Victor Jobin; Fernand Dansereau
- Narrated by: Claude Jutra
- Cinematography: Guy Borremans
- Edited by: Gilles Groulx
- Music by: Les Jérolas
- Production company: National Film Board of Canada
- Release date: 1961
- Running time: 27 minutes and 43 seconds
- Country: Canada
- Languages: English; French

Golden Gloves is a 1961 Direct Cinema documentary directed by Gilles Groulx about boxers preparing for a Golden Gloves tournament in Montreal. The film is narrated by Claude Jutra.

Golden Gloves focuses on three Montreal boxers in training, exploring their lives and hopes. The 1961 film marked a shift among French-Canadian filmmakers at the NFB away from folkloric films towards works that dealt with contemporary Quebec society.

One of the featured fighters, Black Canadian Ronald Jones, was later cast in a small role in Michel Brault's 1967 drama Entre la mer et l'eau douce. A sequence with Jones and his brother was also used in the 2008 production The Memories of Angels.

== Release ==
During its 1964–1965 season, CBC Television aired Golden Gloves as part of its NFB Presents series of short films.
