= René Bonnière =

French Canadian film director

- Born: 10 March 1928 (age 98); Lyon, France
- Occupations: Film director, editor
- Years active: 1956–present
- Spouse: Claude Bonnière

René Gabriel Bonnière (born 10 March 1928) is a Canadian film director and editor, originally from France. He has had a prolific career, working in television and film in both French and English productions.

== Biography ==
Bonnière was born in Lyon, France. He first began his film career in France as a director for the French army, working alongside Henri Colpi and composer Georges Delerue. He then worked as an assistant to filmmaking pioneer Marcel L'Herbier.

He emigrated from France in May 1955, arriving in New York City with his wife, Claude, on the SS Flandre. Bonnière spent six months working at a bank on Wall Street before looking north for a return to the film industry. He contacted filmmaker F. R. Crawley and the National Film Board of Canada (NFB); Crawley met him in New York and invited him to move to Canada.

From 1956 to 1971, Bonnière worked for Crawley Films, directing dozens of films. His first works were Beaver Dam (short), Maîtres artisans du Canada and The Legend of the Raven. He also collaborated with Pierre Perrault, considered one of Canada's finest filmmakers.

In 1963, he directed Amanita Pestilens, the first Canadian film in colour and the first to be shot simultaneously in English and French.

In a profile on Bonnière, Cinémathèque québécoise notes that his work for Crawley helped bridge the gap between Canada's French- and English-language films.

He also worked for the NFB, producing several documentaries, many about Canada's indigenous communities.

== Personal life ==
Bonnière is married to artist Claude Bonnière, who won a 1982 Daytime Emmy Award for art direction for the ABC Afterschool Special, My Mother Was Never a Kid.

== Filmography ==
Bonnière has worked as a director and editor in both television and film.

=== Television ===
- Wojeck (1966)
- Vicky (1973)
- Matt and Jenny (nine episodes, 1979–1980)
- Hide and Seek (1984)
- The Edison Twins (1984)
- Night Heat (15 episodes, 1985–1988)
- The Little Vampire (1986)
- Perfect Timing (1986)
- Alfred Hitchcock Presents (six episodes, 1988–1989)
- The Twilight Zone (three episodes, 1988–1989)
  - The Curious Case of Edgar Witherspoon
  - Rendezvous in a Dark Place
  - Appointment on Route 17
- Labor of Love (1990)
- Road to Avonlea (four episodes, 1990–1991)
- Forever Knight (1992)
- Johann's Gift to Christmas (1991)
- Kung Fu: The Legend Continues (five episodes, 1994)
- The Odyssey (five episodes, 1994)
  - Under the Bed (1995)
- Outer Limits (1995)
- Goosebumps (two episodes, 1996)
- Side Effects (1996)
- The Halfback of Notre Dame (1996)
- La Femme Nikita (21 episodes, 1997–2001)
- Lassie (1997)
- Dead Man's Gun (two episodes, 1997–1998)
- Eerie, Indiana: The Other Dimension (1998)
- Highlander: The Raven (two episodes, 1998)
- Code Name: Eternity (five episodes, 2000)
- Elizabeth I – Red Rose of the House of Tudor (2000)
- Haven't We Met Before? (2002)
- Pretend You Don't See Her (2002)
- Mutant X (two episodes, 2003–2004)

=== Films ===
- Winter Crossing at l'Isle-aux-Coudres (La Traversée d'hiver à l'Île aux Coudres), 1960
- White-Whale Hunters of Anse-aux-Basques, 1960
- Turlutte (La riviere du Gouffre), 1960
- Three Seasons (La Pitoune), 1960
- Soiree at St. Hilarion (En Revenant de St-Hilarion), 1960
- On the Sea (Les Goelettes), 1960
- The Land of Jacques Cartier (Toutesisles), 1960
- Ka Ke Ki Ku, 1960
- Canadian Diamonds (Les Diamants du Canada), 1960
- Winter Sealing at La Tabatiere (L'anse Tabatiere), 1963
- Whalehead (Tete-a-le-baleine), 1963
- The Jean Richard (Le Jean Richard), 1963
- Attiuk, 1963
- Amanita Pestilens, 1963
- Les Annanacks, 1964
- The Discoverers, 1972
- Hamlet, 1973
- A Sense of Place (Une Place au Monde), 1976
- Twelve and a Half Cents, 1977
- The War Is Over (Elle est Finie, la Guerre), 1978
- Voice of the Fugitive (Frontière de la Liberté), 1978
- Dream Man, 1995
- Au Pays de Neufve-France, Volumes I-IV, 1997
