= List of La Femme Nikita episodes =

This is a list of episodes in La Femme Nikita, a television series from Warner Bros. and Fireworks Entertainment. The series premiered on USA Network on January 13, 1997, and ran from 1997 to 2001.

== Series overview ==
Season	Episodes	Originally released	
Season	Episodes	First released	Last released
1	22	January 13, 1997	October 5, 1997
2	22	January 4, 1998	August 30, 1998
3	22	January 3, 1999	August 29, 1999
4	22	January 9, 2000	August 27, 2000
5	8	January 7, 2001	March 4, 2001

== Episodes ==
=== Season 1 (1997) ===
No. overall	No. in season	Title	Directed by	Written by	Original release date
1	1	"Nikita"	Jon Cassar	Cyrus Nowrasteh	January 13, 1997
Young Nikita is falsely accused of murder; while in prison a secretive agency makes her an offer she cannot refuse.
2	2	"Friend"	Guy Magar	Naomi Janzen	January 20, 1997
An old friend of Nikita recognizes her while she is in a mission; danger threatens now both of them.
3	3	"Simone"	Jerry Ciccoritti	Michael Loceff	January 27, 1997
Section One is fighting the terrorist organization that assassinated Simone, Michael's late wife.
4	4	"Charity"	Kari Skogland	Robert Cochran	February 3, 1997
Nikita is supposed to seduce Alec Chandler for reasons unknown; when she starts to fall for him she discovers something unexpected.
5	5	"Mother"	Guy Magar	Naomi Janzen	February 10, 1997
A nuclear trigger is in the hands of two criminals, husband and wife, who intend to sell it to the highest bidder. Nikita has to get creative in order to infiltrate the criminal group.
6	6	"Love"	Jon Cassar	Michael Loceff	February 17, 1997
Section One needs to obtain information on the next terrorist attack planned by some Eric Webber. Michael and Nikita, to infiltrate that terror cell, pose as the husband and wife bodyguards that Webber has hired.
7	7	"Treason"	Jerry Ciccoritti	Robert Cochran	February 24, 1997
When things go awry in a mission, Nikita suspects there is a traitor in Section One.
8	8	"Escape"	George Bloomfield	Andrew Dettmann & Daniel Truly	March 3, 1997
Eric Webber, a Section One operative, proposes NIkita to escape together from Section One; however Nikita is apprehensive whether she can really trust him.
9	9	"Gray"	Ken Girotti	Robert Cochran	March 10, 1997
Section One's computer infrastructure is hacked and someone stole the directory listing all operatives in Section One. Then, a secret auction is organized by criminal mastermind Harding, and Section One has to outbid a terrorist network intended in obtaining that directory.
10	10	"Choice"	George Bloomfield	Michael Loceff	April 7, 1997
Section One is tasked to investigate a drug deal gone wrong that caused many deaths. Among the dead is a CIA agent that was undercover in a drug network that distributes heroin in Europe and North America.
11	11	"Rescue"	Ken Girotti	Peter Bellwood	April 14, 1997
Michael is wounded and left behind during a mission to destroy a chemical weapons installation; Nikita frantically tries to rescue him.
12	12	"Innocent"	George Bloomfield	Michael Loceff	April 21, 1997
While Section One focuses on a man being involved on a terrorist operation, Nikita comes to believe it's a misunderstanding and that he is innocent.
13	13	"Recruit"	Reza Badiyi	Larry Raskin	June 22, 1997
Nikita feels disquieted by Karyn, a new recruit who flirts with Michael. However, there may be deeper troubles than personal disaffection.
14	14	"Gambit"	Jon Cassar	Michael Loceff	June 29, 1997
Madeline may have found her match when Section One goes after Kessler, a cold-blooded assassin, and master of disguise, hired by a terrorist network to contaminate the water supply of a major city.
15	15	"Obsessed"	T.J. Scott	Robert Cochran	July 20, 1997
Lisa, a married woman, is befriended by Nikita and seduced by Michael in order to obtain the computer files of her husband's computer; Nikita is anguished by the way she and Michael are deceiving Lisa.
16	16	"Noise"	Reza Badiyi & T.J. Scott	Michael Loceff	July 27, 1997
Birkoff kills a person during a mission. Nikita sees Birkoff seems distressed after that and tries to help him without Section One noticing Birkoff's problems.
17	17	"War"	René Bonnière	Maurice Hurley	August 3, 1997
When all-out war between Section One and Red Cell is triggered, Nikita and Michael are captured and tortured for information.
18	18	"Missing"	Reza Badiyi	Naomi Janzen	August 10, 1997
Operations promises Nikita her freedom in exchange of keeping his son, an arms dealer, alive.
19	19	"Voices"	David Warry-Smith	Maurice Hurley	August 17, 1997
A serial killer haphazardly attacks Nikita, who foils him. Then, a cop pursues her afterward as a key witness of those crimes.
20	20	"Brainwash"	René Bonnière	Peter Bellwood	September 21, 1997
Nikita tries a VR headset but gets brainwashed into performing a murder.
21	21	"Verdict"	René Bonnière & Gilbert M. Shilton	Peter Bellwood & Robert Cochran	September 28, 1997
Nikita is the bodyguard of Jovan Mijovoch, a foreign premier that is in danger of being murdered. However, the unsavory past of Jovan Mijovoch makes Nikita doubt whether he is worse than his would be assassin.
22	22	"Mercy"	Joseph Scanlan	Michael Loceff	October 5, 1997
Nikita makes an irreparable decision on a mission; Section One seems weary of her and Michael unable to further protect her.

=== Season 2 (1998) ===
No. overall	No. in season	Title	Directed by	Written by	Original release date
23	1	"Hard Landing"	Jon Cassar	Michael Loceff	January 4, 1998
Nikita escaped Section One and is believed to be dead; while working as a waitress she is kidnapped by the Freedom League, a terrorist group that locks her up in their HQ.
24	2	"Spec Ops"	T.J. Scott	Robert Cochran	January 11, 1998
Nikita is afraid Section One may discovers her deceitfulness when she is assigned to Jurgen, an agent who will evaluate her psychological and emotional fitness.
25	3	"Third Person"	Jon Cassar	Michael Loceff	January 18, 1998
Jurgen keeps training and monitoring Nikita and they start to share a bond; Michael is distrustful and Jurgens fears Michael wants to kill him.
26	4	"Approaching Zero"	René Bonnière	Michael Loceff	February 1, 1998
Jurgen invites Nikita to his country house; when they are to make love Section One interrupts them with an important assignment. Jurgen accepts to run in a suicide mission. Unbeknownst to Nikita, Jurgen is blackmailing Section One.
27	5	"New Regime"	Jon Cassar	Robert Cochran	March 1, 1998
The new chief of Section One, Egran Petrosian, begins to perform significant changes to the agency while Operations is in recovery of an assassination attempt. Petrosian offers Nikita to be his right hand, which diminishes Madelaine's role.
28	6	"Mandatory Refusal"	Ken Girotti	David Ehrman	March 8, 1998
Michael is sent to kill a terrorist called Dorian Enquist, but the mission goes wrong. As Enquist captures Madeline, she uses her to blackmail Operations into stopping Michael, who keeps trying to accomplish his original mission.
29	7	"Half Life"	René Bonnière	Maurice Hurley	March 22, 1998
Michael meets again Rene Denon, the leader of a terrorist group, and an old friend of his. Rene Denon looked after Michael's sister after Section One faked Michael's arrest and death, and now Michael tries to return the favor by helping Rene to escape from Section One.
30	8	"Darkness Visible"	Ken Girotti	David Ehrman	March 29, 1998
While in a mission in the Balkans to stop an international arms dealer to procure weapons for a rebel force, Michael and Nikita help two kids to escape the country.
31	9	"Open Heart"	René Bonnière	Elliot Stern	April 5, 1998
Red Cell uses a surgeon to implant a bomb in the abdomen of a person. Nikita has to contact Jenna Vogler, the only person who can identify the human bomb, and purposefully lets herself be arrested for hashish smuggling.
32	10	"First Mission"	Guy Magar	Peter Mohan & Jim Henshaw	April 12, 1998
Operations has many active missions and not enough team leaders, so Michael designates Nikita as team leader. Nikita has to choose her own team to capture Phillip Stark, who has been acquiring worn out fuel rods from Eastern Europe nuclear reactors.
33	11	"Psychic Pilgrim"	René Bonnière	Michael Loceff	April 19, 1998
Michael and Nikita pretend to be a married couple to gather information from Roland Armel, the lawyer of the leader of First Flag, a terrorist group.
34	12	"Soul Sacrifice"	David Warry-Smith	Michael Loceff	June 14, 1998
Terry is an operative that, being pregnant, decides to escape Section One to save her unborn child. Michael and Nikita bring her back to Section One and, to save her life, do not report her transgression.
35	13	"Not Was"	René Bonnière	Michael Loceff	June 21, 1998
Section One steals some secret files from a high level operative of Red Cell. Later, Michael is kidnapped by Red Cell, interrogated and injected with a drug that ends up erasing his memory.
36	14	"Double Date"	Jon Cassar	Robert Cochran	June 28, 1998
David Fanning, that was supposed to have been assassinated by Section One, comes back to work for Section because of his knowledge on Nikolai Kusto, the next target and former head of the Romanian Secret Police. However, David Fanning is a psychopath, an assassin and a brutal wife-beater.
37	15	"Fuzzy Logic"	Ken Girotti	Michael Loceff	July 5, 1998
A new terrorist group causing small bombings is detected by Section One, that suspects they are preparing for an attack of mass destruction. Section One needs to uncover the computer cipher the group is using to have any chance of stopping them.
38	16	"Old Habits"	Terry Ingram	Maurice Hurley	July 12, 1998
Nikita sees a bus depot exploding while full of people, and swears to herself to stop Bright Star, the culprit terrorist group. Section One has found out that Gregory Formitz is who forges the passports and visas used by the group, and they try to recruit him for a mission targeting Bright Star.
39	17	"Inside Out"	Ken Girotti	Maurice Hurley	July 26, 1998
Section One identifies a possible munitions depot of Red Cell near Glasgow and sends a team to attack and destroy the depot. However, when Mowen returns to Section he is infected with a deadly virus.
40	18	"Off Profile"	John Fawcett	David Ehrman	August 2, 1998
Andrea Karsov, a beautiful and snotty mission profiler, is assigned to Michael's team to gain field experience.
41	19	"Last Night"	Clark Johnson	Robert Cochran	August 9, 1998
Nikita is searching for Julia, a nine year old girl she met during a mission to capture Jaochin Beeka, a mercenary demolitions expert hired by a terror group.
42	20	"In Between"	Joseph Scanlan	Michael Loceff	August 16, 1998
Oligarch Abel Goellner uses his huge financial assets to destabilize Third World countries aligned with the West. Nikita and Michael pose as money brokers to meet with Goellner.
43	21	"Adrian's Garden"	Brad Turner	Michael Loceff	August 23, 1998
Nikita is kidnapped by Carla, her former neighbor, together with her boyfriend Steven, and taken to the country house of Adrian, founder of Section One and the only person alive who has been able to leave it.
44	22	"End Game"	Joseph Scanlan	Robert Cochran & David Ehrman	August 30, 1998
Adrian convinces Nikita that she wants to destroy Section One. Adrian instructs her how to obtain compromising files from privy areas in Section that would incriminate the agency, but Operations and Madeline are suspicious of Nikita concerning several security breaks that have been detected in Section.

=== Season 3 (1999) ===
No. overall	No. in season	Title	Directed by	Written by	Original release date
45	1	"Looking for Michael"	Jon Cassar	Michael Loceff	January 3, 1999
Nikita is desperately seeking Michael while Operations and Madeline are setting up a plan to kill her. Nikita meets Michael's wife and son.
46	2	"Someone Else's Shadow"	René Bonnière	Michael Loceff	January 10, 1999
Section One captures and tortures a friend of Salla Vacek to gather information about his terrorist plans, while Nikita moves closer to Elena, his daughter.
47	3	"Opening Night Jitters"	Jon Cassar	David J. Burke	January 17, 1999
Michael poisons his wife Elena, as he was ordered by Section One in order to trap her father, terrorist Salla Vacek.
48	4	"Gates of Hell"	René Bonnière	Robert Cochran	January 24, 1999
Michael considers suicide after he is forbidden to have any contact with his son. Nikita is kidnapped during a mission with Michael and he tries to rescue her without any regards for his own life.
49	5	"Imitation of Death"	Brad Turner	Cyrus Nowrasteh	March 7, 1999
Section One wipes out a genetics lab created to produce perfect terrorists. Nikita has a suspicion on Section One having a similar lab, but Michael remains unconvinced.
50	6	"Love and Country"	Ted Hanlan	Laurence Hertzog	March 21, 1999
Madeline tries to convince the wife of a South American politician to kill his husband; she is also a former wife of Operations.
51	7	"Cat and Mouse"	Terry Ingram	Ed Horowitz	March 28, 1999
During an operation Nikita is kidnapped and, unbeknown to all others, supplanted by a terrorist made to look exactly like her.
52	8	"Outside the Box"	Gord Langevin	Jim Korris	April 4, 1999
Benjamin Kruger, a man with eidetic memory, is kidnapped by Section One, but refuses to cooperate. Madeline, to threaten him, shows Kruger a fake tape of him murdering someone.
53	9	"Slipping Into Darkness"	Rick Jacobson	Peter M. Lenkov	April 11, 1999
Michael slips a psychotropic agent into Operation's coffee. As Operation's mind breaks apart into paranoia and delusions he sends several operatives to apprehend a man who has been dead for years.
54	10	"Under the Influence"	Rick Jacobson	Peter M. Lenkov	April 18, 1999
Section One tries to find anthrax rockets that two terrorist brothers stole. A risky plan with Nikita posing as the wife of one of the brothers is put into effect by erasing his memory.
55	11	"Walk on By"	René Bonnière	Michael Loceff	April 25, 1999
An old acquaintance of Nikita tells her where is Nikita's mother. As she realizes her mother does not believe Nikita is dead, and wants to hire a private eye to find her, she asks Michael to pose as a private detective.
56	12	"Threshold of Pain"	Terry Ingram	Michael Sloan	June 6, 1999
Nikita and two operatives are captured when Section One attacks a terrorist network called Blak March. One operative gives out the location of a Section substation to save his lover; later, he blames Nikita for the unveiling.
57	13	"Beyond the Pale"	René Bonnière	Lawrence Hertzog	June 13, 1999
Zalman gets promoted to head strategist instead of Michael. Nikita and Michael escape from Section, but he is captured. Michael resists torture but when Zalman threatens his son he reveals Nikita's location.
58	14	"Hand to Hand"	T.J. Scott	Ed Horowitz	June 20, 1999
Nikita infiltrates a white slavery ring while Michael poses as a business man in order to take out a terrorist that is a client of the ring.
59	15	"Before I Sleep"	Joel Surnow	Peter M. Lenkov	June 27, 1999
60	16	"I Remember Paris"	Terry Ingram	Michael Loceff	July 18, 1999
61	17	"All Good Things"	Terry Ingram	Ed Horowitz	July 25, 1999
62	18	"Third Party Ripoff"	T.J. Scott	Michael Loceff	August 1, 1999
63	19	"Any Means Necessary"	David Straiton	Lawrence Hertzog	August 8, 1999
64	20	"Three Eyed Turtle"	Jon Cassar	Maurice Hurley	August 15, 1999
65	21	"Playing With Fire"	Joseph Scanlan	Peter M. Lenkov	August 22, 1999
66	22	"On Borrowed Time"	Ted Hanlan	Peter M. Lenkov	August 29, 1999

=== Season 4 (2000) ===
No. overall	No. in season	Title	Directed by	Written by	Original release date
67	1	"Getting Out of Reverse"	Jon Cassar	Michael Loceff	January 9, 2000
68	2	"There Are No Missions"	René Bonnière	Michael Loceff	January 9, 2000
69	3	"View of the Garden"	Jon Cassar	Robert Cochran	January 16, 2000
70	4	"Into the Looking Glass"	René Bonnière	Peter M. Lenkov	January 23, 2000
71	5	"Man in the Middle"	Ted Hanlan	Lawrence Hertzog	February 20, 2000
72	6	"Love, Honor and Cherish"	Terry Ingram	Lawrence Hertzog	February 27, 2000
73	7	"Sympathy for the Devil"	Brad Turner	Lawrence Hertzog	March 5, 2000
74	8	"No One Lives Forever"	Brad Turner	Peter M. Lenkov	March 12, 2000
75	9	"Down A Crooked Path"	Terry Ingram	Peter M. Lenkov	March 19, 2000
76	10	"He Came From Four"	René Bonnière	Ed Horowitz	April 2, 2000
77	11	"Time to be Heroes"	Jerry Ciccoritti	Peter M. Lenkov	April 16, 2000
78	12	"Hell Hath No Fury"	René Bonnière	Lawrence Hertzog	April 23, 2000
79	13	"Kiss the Past Goodbye"	Brad Turner	Frederick Rappaport	June 25, 2000
80	14	"Line in the Sand"	Joel Surnow	Peter M. Lenkov	July 2, 2000
81	15	"Abort, Fail, Retry, Terminate"	Brad Turner	Peter M. Lenkov	July 16, 2000
82	16	"Catch A Falling Star"	Joseph Scanlan	Lawrence Hertzog	July 23, 2000
83	17	"Sleeping With the Enemy"	Jon Cassar	Erica Byrne	July 30, 2000
84	18	"Toys in the Basement"	René Bonnière	Lawrence Hertzog	August 6, 2000
85	19	"Time Out of Mind"	Brad Turner	David Ehrman	August 13, 2000
86	20	"Face in the Mirror"	René Bonnière	Peter M. Lenkov & Lawrence Hertzog	August 20, 2000
87	21	"Up the Rabbit Hole"	Terry Ingram	Lawrence Hertzog & Peter M. Lenkov	August 27, 2000
88	22	"Four Light Years Farther"	Joseph Scanlan	Michael Loceff	August 27, 2000

=== Season 5 (2001) ===
No. overall	No. in season	Title	Directed by	Written by	Original release date
89	1	"Déjà Vu All Over Again"	Jon Cassar	Robert Cochran	January 7, 2001
90	2	"A Girl Who Wasn't There"	Terry Ingram	Lawrence Hertzog	January 14, 2001
91	3	"In Through the Out Door"	René Bonnière	David Wolkove	January 21, 2001
92	4	"All the World's A Stage"	Joel Surnow	David Wolkove	February 4, 2001
93	5	"The Man Behind the Curtain"	René Bonnière	Lawrence Hertzog	February 11, 2001
94	6	"The Evil That Men Do"	Roy Dupuis	Andrew J. Horne & Katherine Tomlinson	February 18, 2001
95	7	"Let No Man Put Asunder"	René Bonnière	Lawrence Hertzog	February 25, 2001
96	8	"A Time For Every Purpose"	Brad Turner	Michael Loceff	March 4, 2001
