= Acadia, Acadia =

Acadia, Acadia?!?
- French: L'Acadie, L'Acadie?!?
- Directed by: Michel Brault; Pierre Perrault
- Produced by: Guy L. Coté; Paul Larose
- Starring: Irène Doiron; Michel Blanchard; Bernard Gauvin; Blondine Maurice; Régis Brun; Jean Cormier
- Cinematography: Michel Brault; Alain Dostie; Guy Dufaux; André-Luc Dupont; Pierre Mignot
- Edited by: Monique Fortier
- Music by: Valère Blais; Majorique Duguay
- Production company: National Film Board of Canada
- Release date: May 1971 (Cannes)
- Running time: 117 minutes
- Country: Canada
- Language: French

Acadia, Acadia?!? (French: L'Acadie, L'Acadie?!?) is a Canadian documentary film, directed by Michel Brault and Pierre Perrault and released in 1971. The film documents the student protests that rocked the Université de Moncton in 1968, ostensibly over a proposed tuition hike but augmented by simmering linguistic and political tensions between anglophone and francophone residents of the Canadian province of New Brunswick, which would ultimately come to be recognized as an important watershed moment in the history of Acadian culture.

The film premiered in the Directors' Fortnight program at the 1971 Cannes Film Festival.
