= Gilles Groulx =

Canadian filmmaker (1931–1994)

- Born: August 30, 1931; Montreal, Quebec, Canada
- Died: August 22, 1994 (aged 63); Longueuil, Quebec, Canada
- Occupations: Film director Film editor Screenwriter
- Years active: 1958 - 1983
- Spouse: Barbara Ulrich

Gilles Groulx (August 30, 1931 in Montreal, Quebec – August 22, 1994) was a Canadian film director. He grew up in a working-class family with 14 children. After studying business in school, he went to work in an office but found the white-collar environment wasn't for him. He attended the École du meuble de Montréal for a time and was a supporter of Borduas' automatiste movement. His 8 mm amateur films, landed him a job as picture editor in the news department of the CBC. He was later hired by the National Film Board (NFB) during the beginning of the candid eye movement in 1956.

== National Film Board ==
His first film with the NFB was The Snowshoers (Les Raquetteurs) in 1958. Co-directed with Michel Brault, it included contributions of sound recordist Marcel Carrière. The documentary followed the celebration of a snowshoe competition in Quebec. Focusing on capturing reality as it is, the film is considered one of the precursors of direct cinema.

In 1961, Groulx's focus shifted from the crowd to the individual, with his short documentary, Golden Gloves. In 1962 he shifted away from documentaries and directed Seeing Miami (Voir Miami) a poetic film allegory of the U.S. during the Cuban Missile Crisis.

In 1964, Groulx turned to a highly social and political type of filmmaking, which would be characteristic of his work to the very end. The Cat in the Bag (Le Chat dans le sac), his first feature-length drama, is about coming of age: for the protagonists as they face difficult political choices, and in an allegory for the people of Quebec. Groulx wrote, directed the film, and did his own editing (as he would for all subsequent films). In his dramas, Groulx liked to film non-professionals who were the real characters in the story or who were very similar to them and could improvise within a given situation.

Before undertaking another feature, Groulx made the documentary short Such a Simple Game (Un jeu si simple) in 1965, a dramatic look at the sport of hockey in the province of Quebec, specifically the Montreal Canadiens teams of 1950-1960.

This was followed in 1969 by the film Where Are You? (Où êtes-vous donc ?), an experimental film reflecting the daily lives of Quebeckers in the late 60's. The film explores the daily lives of three main characters who embody different attitudes about consumerism. Barraging the spectators with a disturbing mix of chanting voices, songs, quotations and advertisements from the mass media, the film is a protest against the consumer society, a denunciation of the dehumanizing mechanisms created and used by man against man.

Continuing on this vein, Groulx made 24 heures ou plus, which was censored by the NFB. Shot at the end of 1971, the film was not officially released until 1977.

In 1977, he directed the feature-length documentary Première question sur le bonheur, a Mexico-Canada co-production which centers on the land reform in Mexico at the end of the 1970's.

In 1980, Groulx was involved in an automobile accident that almost put an end to his career. He managed to come back in 1982 and complete the feature film he had been working on. Au Pays de Zom is a film opera that satirizes the modern world of finance. Joseph Rouleau, an opera singer, plays the role of a financier.

== Legacy ==
Groulx's films explored different aspects of Quebec society. He was one of the first Quebec filmmakers to make auteur films, both documentary and drama.

The Cat in the Bag (Le Chat dans le sac) (1964) remains his best known film and played a seminal role in the development of Quebec cinema. In 1985, the Government of Quebec presented Groulx with the Prix Albert-Tessier for lifetime achievement.

Si mes films défendent la liberté des peuples, comme créateur je me dois de lutter pour ma propre liberté.

If my films are defending the freedom of peoples, as a creator I must fight for my own freedom.

— Gilles Groulx

His widow Barbara Ulrich, who had been one of the stars of The Cat in the Bag but did not maintain a significant acting career afterward, remained an active spokesperson for Groulx's cinematic legacy following his death.

== Filmography ==
Documentary film

- Les héritiers (Short, 1954)
- The Snowshoers (Les Raquetteurs) (Short Co-Directed with Michel Brault, 1958)
- Normétal (Short, 1959)
- La France sur un caillou (Short Co-Directed with Claude Fournier, 1960)
- Golden Gloves (Short, 1961)
- Seeing Miami (Voir Miami) (Short, 1962)
- Such a Simple Game (Un jeu si simple) (Short, 1966)
- Québec...? (Short, 1967)
- Place de l'équation (1973)
- 24 heures ou plus (1976)
- Première question sur le bonheur (1977)

Feature film

- The Cat in the Bag (Le Chat dans le sac) (1964)
- Where Are You Then? (Où êtes-vous donc?) (1970)
- Entre tu et vous (1970)
- Au pays de Zom (1982)

== See also ==
- Direct Cinema
- Cinema of Quebec
