= Pierre Perrault =

Canadian film director

- Born: 29 June 1927; Montreal, Quebec, Canada
- Died: 23 June 1999 (aged 71); L'Isle-aux-Coudres, Canada
- Occupations: Director, producer, writer, poet
- Years active: 1957-1997

Pierre Perrault OQ (29 June 1927 – 23 June 1999) was a Canadian documentary film director with the National Film Board of Canada. Over his 40-year career, he directed 32 films and was one of Canada's most important filmmakers, although he is largely unknown outside of Québec.

== Early life ==
Perrault was born and raised in Montreal, the son of a prosperous lumber merchant, and attended the most prestigious private schools in the city. Due to rebellious behaviour, he was expelled from Collège de Montréal, and Collège André-Grasset before graduating from Collège Sainte-Marie de Montréal. While there, with Hubert Aquin and Marcel Dubé, he founded the student journal Cahiers d’Arlequin, in which he published his first play, Pierre en vrac.

In 1948, he entered the Université de Montréal Law School, where he was editor of the student journal and won three hockey championships. From there, he studied the history of law at the University of Paris and international law at the University of Toronto. He was called to the bar in 1954 but he had already realized that the law was not his calling.

== Career ==
In 1955, Perrault began writing a weekly radio show at Radio Canada. In 1956, he permanently left the law and began writing for Le chant des hommes, a daily Radio Canada series about folk music. By then, he had married archaeologist Yolande Simard, who was from the Charlevoix region, on the north shore of the St. Lawrence River. In 1956, with French folk singer Jacques Douai, the couple traveled through Charlevoix, interviewing locals and recording their music. These interviews and recordings became the basis of his weekly radio series, Au pays de Neufve-France which, in turn, was the inspiration for a CBC television series of the same name.

On that trip through Charlevoix, Perrault had met many artists and artisans, and he pitched the National Film Board of Canada (NFB) on the idea of doing a film about them. The result, Master Artisans of Canada, was Perrault's first film, and it would introduce Perrault to the director, producer and cinematographer Judith Crawley, who handled the English versions of his work for the rest of his career. Crawley and her husband, Budge Crawley owned a film production company which employed the French director René Bonnière. Perrault and Bonnière came up with the idea of turning the Charlevoix interviews and recordings, and the resultant radio show scripts, into documentary shorts. From 1960 to 1963, the two would create 14 films, 13 of which would become the NFB (and CBC) series St. Lawrence North.

After his next film for the NFB, the critically acclaimed Pour la suite du monde Perrault became a full-time employee of the NFB in 1965. He went on to create another 16 films, most relating to Quebec's culture, society and environment. He retired in 1996 and died three years later, survived by his wife Yolande Simard Perrault (1928–2019) and their two children.

== Legacy ==
Canadian film historian Peter Morris wrote this about Perrault in his 1984 book The Film Companion: "The most famous direct cinema filmmaker in Quebec, who developed a unique 'cinema of speech' that has 'spoken' about Quebec, its land and its people, and that has been at once witness of its past and often prophecy of its future. His approach involves close collaboration with his cinematographers (Michel Brault and Bernard Gosselin, who often co-direct), direct involvement with the people or events, and later, a careful construction of scenes in the editing room. From the 1960s and early 1970s (on Pour la suite du monde, The Times That Are, The River Schooners and Acadia, Acadia) through his later films on Abitibi and First Nations people, he expressed the concept of 'ethnic class' that some feel avoids more basic issues, even though it gave voice to long-buried cultural aspirations."

Perrault's life and work were analyzed by Jean-Daniel Lafond in the 1986 documentary Dream Tracks (Les Traces du rêve).

The Rendez-vous Québec Cinéma film festival has established the Prix Pierre et Yolande Perrault for Best Documentary.

Perrault's papers are held in the Pierre Perrault Archives at Université Laval.

== Honours ==
- Ludger-Duvernay Prize, Saint-Jean-Baptiste Society: Laureate (1968)
- Honorary Doctorate, Laval University (1986)
- Prix Albert-Tessier, Government of Québec (1994)
- Honorary Doctorate, Lumière University Lyon 2 (1996)
- Honorary Doctorate, Université de Sherbrooke (1997)
- Officer, National Order of Québec (1998)

== Filmography ==
All National Film Board of Canada

- Master Artisans of Canada - documentary short 1957 - co-writer with Judith Crawley
- Toutes Isles (All the Islands) - documentary short 1960 - writer, producer, co-director with René Bonnière
- St. Lawrence North: Winter Crossing at L'Isle-Aux-Coudres - documentary short 1960 - writer, producer, co-director with René Bonnière
- St. Lawrence North: White-Whale Hunters of Anse-Aux-Basques - documentary short 1960 - writer, producer, co-director with René Bonnière
- St. Lawrence North: Turlutte - documentary short 1960 - writer, producer, co-director with René Bonnière
- St. Lawrence North: Three Seasons - documentary short 1960 - writer, producer, co-director with René Bonnière
- St. Lawrence North: Soiree at St. Hilarion - documentary short 1960 - writer, producer, co-director with René Bonnière
- St. Lawrence North: On the Sea - documentary short 1960 - writer, producer, co-director with René Bonnière
- St. Lawrence North: The Land of Jacques Cartier - documentary short 1960 - writer, producer, co-director with René Bonnière
- St. Lawrence North: Ka Ke Ki Ku - documentary short 1960 - writer, producer, co-director with René Bonnière
- St. Lawrence North: Canadian Diamonds - documentary short 1960 - writer, producer, co-director with René Bonnière
- St. Lawrence North: The Jean Richard - documentary short 1963 - writer, producer, co-director with René Bonnière
- St. Lawrence North: Whalehead - documentary short 1963 - writer, producer, co-director with René Bonnière
- St. Lawrence North: Attiuk - documentary short 1963 - writer, producer, co-director with René Bonnière
- St. Lawrence North: Winter Sealing at La Tabatière - documentary short 1963 - writer, producer, co-director with René Bonnière
- Pour la suite du monde (aka For the Ones to Come, For Those Who Will Follow, Of Whales, the Moon, and Men and The Moontrap) - documentary 1963 - co-director with Michel Brault
- The Times That Are (Le Règne du jour) - documentary 1967 - director
- The River Schooners (Les Voitures d'eau) - documentary short 1968 - writer, co-director with René Bonnière
- Beluga Days (aka Le Beau plaisir) - documentary short 1968 -co-director with Michel Brault and Bernard Gosselin
- Wake Up, mes bons amis (aka Un Pays sans bon sens) - documentary 1970 - director
- Acadia, Acadia (L'Acadie, L'Acadie?!?) - documentary 1971 - co-director with Michel Brault
- Tickets s.v.p. - animated short film 1973 - writer and director
- Un royaume vous attend (A Kingdom Awaits) - documentary 1976 - director
- Le retour à la terre (Return to Earth) - documentary 1976 - director
- Le goût de la farine - documentary 1977 - director
- Gens d'Abitibi - documentary, 1980 - writer and director
- The Shimmering Beast - documentary 1982 - director
- Land Without Trees, or the Mouchouânipi - documentary 1983 - director
- Les voiles bas et en travers - documentary 1983 - director
- La grande allure - documentary (2 parts) 1985 - writer, director
- Oumigmag or the Fickle Art of Documentary Filmmaking - documentary short 1993 - director
- Icewarrior (aka Cornouailles) - documentary 1996 - writer, director

== Film Awards ==
Winter Crossing at L'Isle-Aux-Coudres (1960)

- 11th Canadian Film Awards, Toronto: Best Film, TV Information, 1959

Pour la suite du monde (1963)

- Ibero-American-Filipino Documentary Film Contest, Bilbao, Spain: First Prize, Gold Medal, 1963
- 16th Canadian Film Awards, Toronto: Film of the Year, 1964
- 16th Canadian Film Awards, Toronto: Special Award "in recognition of its visual qualities, perceptions and artistry”, 1964
- Évreux International Short Film Festival, Évreux, France: Grand Prize, Golden Viking, 1964
- Columbus International Film & Animation Festival, Columbus, Ohio: Chris Award, First Prize 1966
- Melbourne Film Festival, Melbourne: Diploma of Merit, 1966
- Sardinia International Ethnographic Film Festival, Nuoro, Italy: Special Mention, 1994
- Toronto International Film Festival, Toronto: Canada's Ten-Best Films, 8th Place, 1984

Acadia Acadia?!? (1971)

- Festival international du film d'expression française, Dinard, France: L'Émeraude de Dinard - Festival's Grand Prize, 1971

Oumigmag or the Fickle Art of Documentary Filmmaking (1993)

- New York EXPO of Short Film and Video, New York: Gold Medal, Animation, 1993
- International Wildlife Film Festival, Albert, Somme, France: Jury Mention 1994
- Alberta Film & Television Awards, Calgary: Jury Mention 1994

Icewarrior (1996)

- Festival du Film des Diablerets, Les Diablerets, Switzerland: Diable d'Or Award, Safety of Mountain Environment, 1996
- European Nature Film Festival Valvert, Brussels: Third Place

== Bibliography ==
Most of Perrault's writings were adapted from his radio programs and films. The poems in his first two books of poetry, Portulan and Ballades du temps précieux were adapted from his radio scripts. Many of the prose poems in Toutes Isles: chroniques de terre et de mer, and the poems in En déspesoir de cause: poèms de circonstances atténuantes were from his films. Works from these three collections formed the basis of Chouennes: poems, 1961–71.

Perrault's books of prose writing, Le Mal du nord and Nous autres icitte à l’île, included writings by Jacques Cartier and other explorers, as well as oral histories of the people Perrault had interviewed over the years. He published three volumes of poetry in the late 1990s—Jusqu’à plus oultre…, Irréconciliabules and La visage humain d’un fleuve sans estuaire, and the notes he had compiled for a book he was writing about the St Lawrence River, Partismes, were published posthumously in 2001. The notes he kept about the city of Montreal, and interviews he had done with Montrealers, were published in 2009 as J'habite une ville. Two other posthumously published books are from dozens of interviews with Perrault conducted by the film scholar Simone Suchet.

- Imagerie sur ma ville (1961)
- Portulan (1961)
- Ballades du temps précieux (1963)
- Toutes Isles: chroniques de terre et de mer (1963)
- En déspesoir de cause: poèms de circonstances atténuantes (1971)
- Chouennes: poems, 1961–71 (1975)
- De la parole aux actes (1985)
- La Grande Allure: Recit de Voyage 1991
- Le Mal du nord (1991)
- Caméramages (1991)
- Jusqu’à plus oultre… (1997)
- Irréconciliabules (1998)
- La visage humain d’un fleuve sans estuaire (1998)
- Nous autres icitte à l’île (1999)
- Partismes (2001)
- J'habite une ville (2009)
- Activiste poétique: Filmer le Québec (as told to Simone Suchet) (2014)
- Pierre Perrault, un homme debout (as told to Simone Suchet) (2015)

== Literary Awards ==
- Grand Jury Prize for Canadian Letters: Portulan, 1961
- Governor General's Literary Award: Au coeur de la rose, 1964
- Governor General's Literary Award: Chouennes: poems, 1961–71, 1975
- Prix Victor-Barbeau, Académie des lettres du Québec: L’oumigmatique ou l’objectif documentaire, 1996
- Governor General's Literary Award: Le Mal du Nord, 1999
