= Marcel Carrière =

Canadian film director and sound engineer

- Born: April 16, 1935 (age 91); Bouchette, Quebec, Canada
- Occupations: Film director Sound engineer
- Years active: 1955–1980

Marcel Carrière (born April 16, 1935) is a Canadian film director and sound engineer.

== Biography ==
Marcel Carrière joined the NFB in 1955 after studying electronic engineering and developed his skills as a sound engineer while working on wildlife films, the Candid Eye series and the work of the newly formed French Unit. On The Snowshoers (Les Raquetteurs), his love of experimenting led him to devise a way to record synchronized sound before it was technically possible for sound to be synched with the camera. This flexibility and resourcefulness led him to doing sound engineering for the landmark documentary film Pour la suite du monde (1963) in which the sound was a pivotal element. He went on to participate on the sound in more than one hundred productions at the NFB.

Carrière first began to dabble in directing on several shorts with other directors. His first solo effort was Villeneuve, peintre-barbier (1964) but it was the documentary short Avec tambours et trompettes (1968) that was his first great success and drew critical acclaim. In 1973 he directed his first feature film, O.K. ... Laliberté, a major work of Québécois cinema. The film is a comical social satire about a jobless and penniless middle-aged man who has a brief romance with a young woman before being caught by his creditors. Carrière excelled at spotlighting everyday characters not often seen in films.

Carrière was nominated in 1978 as director of the NFB's Program Committee for French Productions and later as director of Technical Services, Distribution, Research and Development. No other French Canadian had before reached such a high position in the hierarchy of the NFB and he held the position until his retirement in 1994. He then had an active role in founding INIS and the Phonothèque québécoise and still offers his services as a consultant on documentary films.

== Filmography ==
=== Fiction ===
- St-Denis dans le temps... - 1969
- O.K. ... Laliberté - 1973
- Le grand voyage - 1974, short film
- Bernie and the Gang (Ti-Mine, Bernie, pis la gang...) - 1976
- La bataille de la Châteauguay - 1978, short film

=== Documentaries ===
- La lutte (Short film Co-Directed with Michel Brault, Claude Fournier and Claude Jutra, 1961)
- Recontres à Mitzic (Short film Co-Directed with Georges Dufaux, 1963)
- Villeneuve, peintre-barbier (Short film, 1964)
- Bois-Francs (Short film, 1966)
- In Search of Medea: The Art of Sylvia Lefkovitz (Short film Co-Directed with Arthur Samuels, 1966)
- La Colombie-Britannique et l'habitation (Short film, 1967)
- L'Indien parle (Short film, 1967)
- With Drums and Trumpets (Avec tambours et trompettes) (Short film, 1968)
- Épisode (Short film, 1968)
- 10 milles/heure/10 Miles/Hour (Short film, 1970)
- Hôtel-Château (Short film, 1970)
- Chez nous, c'est chez nous (1972)
- Images de Chine (1974)
- Ping-pong (Short film, 1974)
- Games of the XXI Olympiad (Jeux de la XXIe olympiade) (Co-Directed with Jean-Claude Labrecque, Jean Beaudin and Georges Dufaux, 1977)
- De grâce et d'embarras (1979)
