= O.K. ... Laliberté =

- Directed by: Marcel Carrière
- Written by: Marcel Carrière; Jean Morin
- Produced by: Marc Beaudet
- Starring: Jacques Godin; Luce Guilbeault; Jean Lapointe
- Cinematography: Thomas Vámos
- Edited by: Werner Nold
- Music by: François Dompierre
- Production company: National Film Board of Canada
- Release date: November 1, 1973
- Running time: 113 minutes
- Country: Canada
- Language: French

O.K. ... Laliberté is a Canadian comedy-drama film, directed by Marcel Carrière and released in 1973. Godin won the Canadian Film Award for Best Actor for his performance.

== Plot ==
The film stars Jacques Godin as Paul Laliberté, a 40-year-old man in Montreal who is embarking on the process of rebuilding his life after a midlife crisis has led him to leave his wife and quit his job. Moving into a rooming house, he takes a new job as a pest exterminator, begins a new romantic relationship with Yvonne (Luce Guilbeault) and reconnects with his old drinking buddy Louis (Jean Lapointe), but soon finds that his new life is no more fulfilling than what he has left behind.
