= Sardinia International Ethnographic Film Festival =

- Location: main location: Nuoro, Italy
- Founded: 1982
- Festival date: second half of September
- Website: http://sieff.isresardegna.it/

Sardinia International Ethnographic Film Festival (SIEFF) is an International Ethnographic film Festival based in Nuoro (Sardinia - Italy) organized by the Istituto superiore regionale etnografico (the Sardinian Regional Institute of Ethnography). The festival, born in 1982 (with the name Festival Internazionale Biennale di Film Etnografici) in conjunction with the Bilan du Film Ethnographique by Jean Rouch, (now Jean Rouch Festival) housed in the Musée de l'Homme in Paris, is the oldest ethnographic cinema festival in Europe. The event is held every two years and takes place in the Auditorium of Museo della vita e delle tradizioni popolari sarde (Museum of Sardinian folk life and traditions) in Nuoro. From 1982 to 2006 the exhibition was dedicated from time to time to a specific theme; since 2006 the Festival has abandoned the traditional monothematic characterization and has focused its program on a selection of recent films, guided by an ethno-anthropological perspective.

The festival has an international character and for the selection the films come from all over the world. As well as the committee for the selection of films, which is regularly composed of representatives of various institutions, which in the world deal with visual anthropology.
