= The Snowshoers =

- French: Les raquetteurs
- Directed by: Michel Brault; Gilles Groulx
- Written by: Michel Brault; Gilles Groulx
- Cinematography: Michel Brault; Gilles Groulx
- Production company: National Film Board of Canada
- Release date: 1958
- Running time: 14 minutes 37 seconds
- Country: Canada
- Language: French

The Snowshoers (French: Les Raquetteurs) is a 1958 Direct Cinema documentary film co-directed by Michel Brault and Gilles Groulx. The film explores life in rural Quebec, at a convention of snowshoers in Sherbrooke, Quebec in February 1958. The film is notable for helping to establish the then-nascent French language production unit at the National Film Board of Canada, and more importantly, the development of a uniquely Quebec style of direct cinema.

The film incorporates agile camera work and a largely synchronous soundtrack, uninterrupted by any narration, in keeping with the ethos of direct cinema to avoid any imposed "truth" on events onscreen.

== Production ==
Grant McLean, then head of production for the NFB, had been angry that what was to have been a three-minute vignette had quadrupled in length and ordered the film to be used for stock footage. However, NFB producers Tom Daly and Guy Glover interceded on the young filmmakers' behalf.

== Release ==
At the time of its release, Les raquetteurs raised some concerns about its "nonofficial" style, and ruffled some feathers in Quebec for its portrayal of rural Quebecers.
