= Bernard Gosselin =

Canadian cinematographer (1934–2006)

- Born: October 5, 1934; Drummondville, Quebec, Canada
- Died: March 20, 2006 (aged 71); Saint-Bernard-de-Lacolle, Quebec, Canada
- Occupations: Cinematographer; Film director Actor
- Years active: 1960 - 1996

Bernard Gosselin (October 5, 1934 – March 20, 2006) was a Canadian cinematographer and documentary film director. He is known for his work with the National Film Board of Canada. He was an early adopter of the direct cinema documentary style.

== Early life and education ==
Gosselin was born in Drummondville, Quebec. He studied at the Institut des arts graphiques in Montreal.

== Career ==
Gosselin worked as a printer. He joined the National Film Board's title department in 1956 to design titles and credits. The French team was in the process of expanding, and he met with many of the filmmakers and technicians working there. He then worked as an assistant cameraman, location manager and assistant editor before photographing his first film, Gilles Groulx's Golden Gloves, in 1961.

After photographing many Quebec films in the 1960s, he directed his first feature film, the children's science fiction movie The Christmas Martian (Le martien de Noël), in 1971; it was his only fiction film outside of his documentary output. He worked as cinematographer on many films by Pierre Perrault, including Pour la suite du monde and Un royaume vous attend. He developed a special interest in the Aboriginal and folk cultures of Quebec, which led to his two best-known important films as a director: César et son canot d'écorce (1971) and Jean Carignan, violoneux (1975). From 1977 to 1980 Gosselin in collaboration with Léo Plamondon photographed and/or directed a series of short films on traditional Quebecois craftspeople for the NFB titled La belle ouvrage.

Gosselin won a Canadian Film Award in 1968 for Best Black-and-White Cinematography, for his work on Perrault's The Times That Are (Le Règne du jour). He died on March 20, 2006, in Saint-Bernard-de-Lacolle, Quebec

== Filmography ==
Short film

- Le jeu de l'hiver (Co-Directed with Jean Dansereau, 1961)
- Les voyageurs (1964)
- Le beau plaisir (Co-Directed with Pierre Perrault and Michel Brault, 1968)
- Capture (a.k.a. The Catch, 1969)
- L'odyssée du Manhattan (1970)
- Passage au Nord-Ouest (1970)
- César et son canot d'écorce (1971)
- Les raquettes des Atcikameg (1973)
- Les boeufs de labour (Co-Directed with Léo Plamondon, 1977) (La Belle Ouvrage series)
- Le pain d'habitant (1re partie) - Construction du four (Co-Directed with Léo Plamondon, 1977) (La Belle Ouvrage series)
- Le pain d'habitant (2e partie) - La caisson (Co-Directed with Léo Plamondon, 1977) (La Belle Ouvrage series)
- Armand Hardy, menuisier-tonnelier (Co-Directed with Léo Plamondon, 1978) (La Belle Ouvrage series)
- Le discours de l'armoire (1978) (La Belle Ouvrage series)
- La fonderie artisanale (1978) (La Belle Ouvrage series)
- Léo Corriveau, maréchal-ferrant (Co-Directed with Léo Plamondon, 1978) (La Belle Ouvrage series)
- Les meuniers de Saint-Eustache (Co-Directed with Léo Plamondon, 1978) (La Belle Ouvrage series)
- Les bottes sauvages (1980) (La Belle Ouvrage series)
- Le canot à Renald à Thomas (1980) (La Belle Ouvrage series)
- Extraits de la veillée des veillées (1980) (La Belle Ouvrage series)
- Vues de l'île d'Anticosti (1987)
- Dire de compagnons (1989)
- En r'montant l'escalier (1989)
- L'aventure Biodôme (1995) (Abridged version of L'arche de verre)

Feature film

- The Christmas Martian (Le martien de Noël) - 1971
- Jean Carignan, violoneux - 1975
- Un royaume vous attend - 1975, co-directed with Pierre Perrault
- La veillée des veillées - 1976
- L'Anticoste - 1986
- L'arche de verre - 1994
