= Wrestling (1961 film) =

- Directed by: Michel Brault; Marcel Carrière; Claude Fournier; Claude Jutra
- Produced by: Jacques Bobet
- Production company: National Film Board of Canada
- Release date: 1961
- Country: Canada
- Language: French

Wrestling (Original French title: La lutte) is a 1961 documentary film about professional wrestling in Montreal. It was produced by Jacques Bobet for the French program branch of the National Film Board of Canada (NFB).

The film was co-directed by Michel Brault, Marcel Carrière, Claude Fournier and Claude Jutra, with Jutra and Fournier as cinematographers. (Due to confusion with the wrestling promotor Don Owen, film scholars have incorrectly credited the NFB's Don Owen as being the cinematographer or assistant director on Wrestling; the latter did not work on the film.)

== Production ==
Wrestling was shot in the Montreal Forum, where major bouts were staged, as well as wrestling parlors where would be wrestlers learned and practiced their craft.

The filmmakers had intended to make a film exposing, in slow motion, the fakery of professional wrestling, until a chance encounter with French philosopher Roland Barthes changed their minds. Barthes was appalled by what they were planning to do, and spoke urgently about the beauty and social role of pro wrestling in the lives of ordinary people. Persuaded by Barthes, the filmmakers set out to make a film that captured the spectacle of the sport, without judging it. And The film shows the wrestling arena to be a sort of modern-day shrine, with wrestling and its rituals taking the place of religion in the then-recently secularized Quebec.

== Awards ==
- American Film and Video Festival, New York: Blue Ribbon, Sports, Recreation, Physical Education, 1962
- Electronic, Nuclear and Teleradio Cinematographic Review, Rome: Second Prize, Documentary 1962
- International Sports Films Festival, Cortina d'Ampezzo, Italy: Diploma of Honour, 1962
- The Flaherty Film Seminar, New York: Honorable Mention, 1962

== See also ==
- Professional wrestling in Canada
