= Auguste François =

Auguste François/ (French pronunciation: [oɡyst fʁɑ̃swa]; 20 August 1857 – 4 July 1935) was a French consul first in Paraguay between 1893 and 1895 then in southern China between 1896 and 1904, first in Longzhou in Guangxi province and Kunming in Yunnan. In China, he is known as Fang Suya (方苏雅).

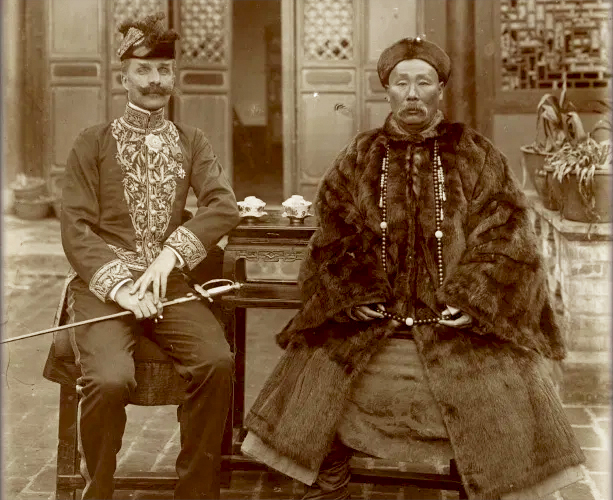
Auguste François, French consul and General Su. Yunnanfu, 1902.

Kunming was then known as Yunnan-fu (云南府), and François spent time there and elsewhere in Yunnan working on obtaining a concession from the government to build the rail line from Vietnam to Kunming.

He also undertook several exploration trips on major rivers and in eastern Tibet. He extensively photographed places and people, from officials to labourers and actors. About an hour of movie footage has also survived.

In retirement, he wrote texts elucidating his images. François's work has been an invaluable means of documenting China's state palaces in the last decade of the empire. His photography is the earliest, largest and most extensive and complete collection of photographs documenting Chinese society at the end of the Qing dynasty. Armed with what was then state-of-the-art photographic and cinematic equipment, François traveled extensively throughout southern China and eventually followed the Yangtze from Yunnan to its terminus in Shanghai. His photographs are some of the earliest and most thorough photographic records of China and the motion pictures he took are thought to be the earliest motion pictures taken in China.

His photo archive is held in France by Guimet Museum and the Association Auguste François. Film archives are held by Gaumont-Pathe Archives, Cinémathèque française, SOAS, Pitt Rivers Museum and BFI.
