= Cinémathèque québécoise =

Film conservatory in Quebec, Canada

Coordinates: 45°30′50″N 73°33′45″W

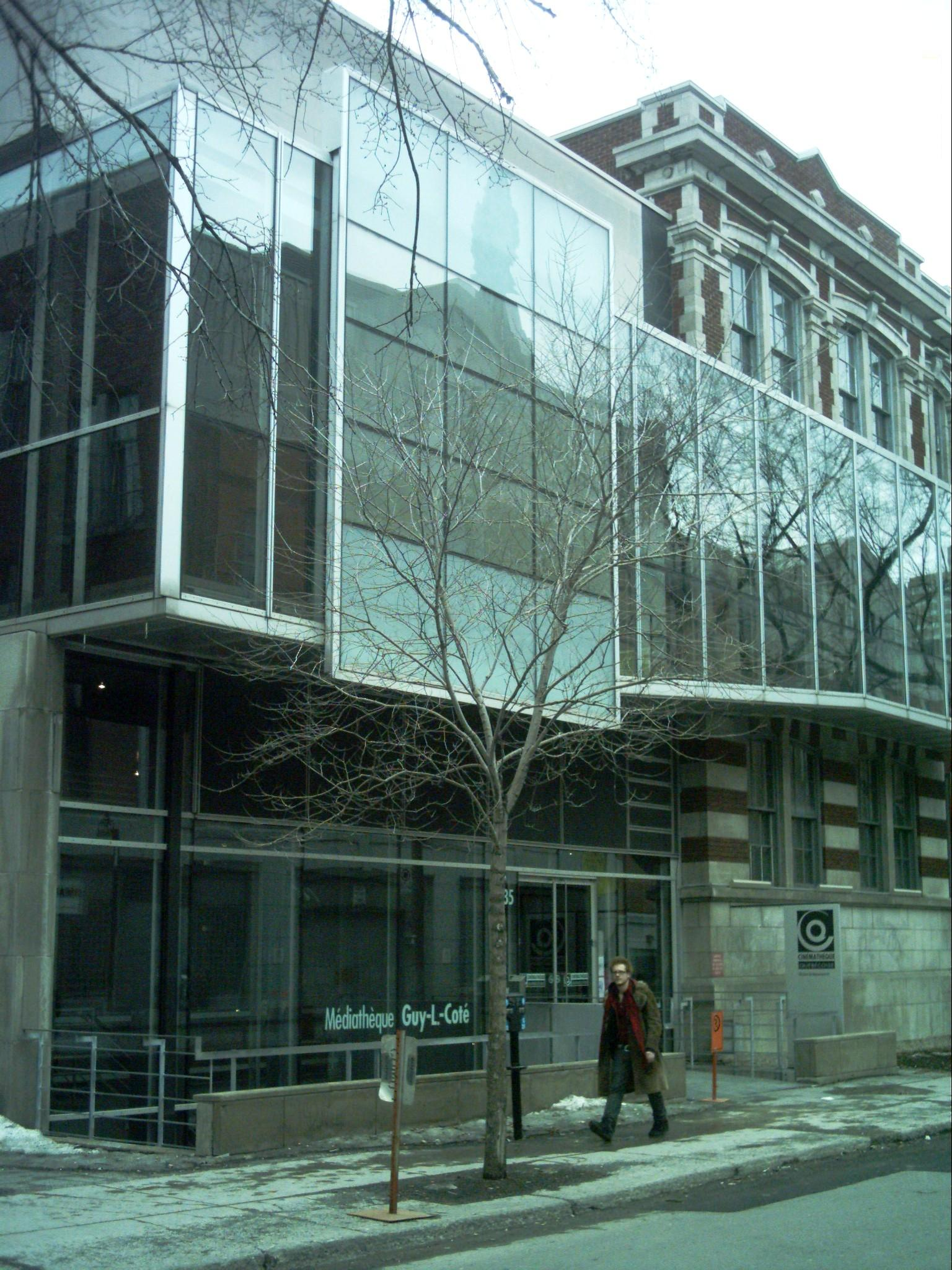
The Cinémathèque québécoise.

The Cinémathèque québécoise (French pronunciation: [sinematɛk kebekwaz]) is a film conservatory in Montreal, Quebec, Canada. Its purpose is to preserve and document film and television footage and related documents and artifacts for future use by the public. The Cinémathèque's collections include over 35,000 films from all eras and countries, 25,000 television programmes, 28,000 posters, 600,000 photos, 2,000 pieces of historical equipment, 15,000 scripts and production documents, 45,000 books, 3,000 magazine titles, thousands of files, as well as objects, props, and costumes. The conservatory also includes a film theatre, which screens rarely seen films and videos.

It is located at 355, boulevard De Maisonneuve (355, De Maisonneuve Boulevard East), in the city's Quartier Latin. The Institut national de l'image et du son is located next door.

== History ==
The Connaissance du cinéma, soon after renamed the Cinémathèque canadienne, was founded in 1963.

In 1971 the institution was renamed Cinémathèque québécoise.

The Cinémathèque complex was extensively redesigned from 1994 to 1997 by the architectural firm of Saucier + Perrotte. Awards for the design included the 1999 Governor General's Award for Architecture.

In 2017 the Cinémathèque québécoise collaborated with the Vancouver Cinematheque, the Toronto International Film Festival and Library and Archives Canada mounted a retrospective of 150 culturally significant films.

== Status and Organization ==
=== Mission ===
The Cinémathèque québécoise is a nonprofit organization dedicated to the cinematographic, televisual, and audiovisual heritage of Quebec, as well as international animated cinema.

For these two fields of expertise, the organization's mission is to acquire, document, preserve, and showcase audiovisual works in and of themselves as well as all the related elements that shed light on their artistic, aesthetic, sociological, economic, and technical contexts (e.g., production documents, scripts, photographs, press articles, scientific and historical documentation, etc.).

The Cinémathèque québécoise also seeks to collect significant works of Canadian and world cinema in order to make them accessible in a cultural and educational aim.

== Collections ==
=== History ===
The Cinémathèque's collections truly began to take shape in 1967 following two events organized by the institution. First, a retrospective of Canadian cinema, which took place during the festivities of the Canadian Centennial, projected copies of films that formed the core of the Cinémathèque's collections. A few months later, a world retrospective of animated cinema was held at the 1967 International and Universal Exposition. For this event, the institution acquired 250 silent animated films by American pioneers in the medium, which formed the base of its animation collection.

In order to pursue the development of its animation collection, the Cinémathèque signed an agreement with the Canadian Broadcasting Corporation in 1968 according to which the animated films produced by the network would be given to the Cinémathèque, accompanied by documents such as the negatives and positives of the films, storyboards, cut-outs, drawings and soundtracks.

In 1969, the Cinémathèque acquired the library of Canadian filmmaker Guy L. Coté, composed of books, periodicals, and press clippings. The collection was managed by the Bibliotheque nationale du Quebec so that it could be accessible to the public via its location at 360 rue McGill. In 1981, the collection was moved to the current Cinémathèque building, where it became part of the Médiathèque Guy-L.-Coté.

During the 1970s, the Cinémathèque sought to raise awareness among Québécois filmmakers of the value of the preservation of their films and related documents. In 1974, an inventory of the institution's photography collection revealed the presence of 5,000 photographs related to international films, 460 related to Canadian cinema, 300 related to animated films, and 1,500 related to important personalities in film.

The 1980s would see a sustained growth in the Cinémathèque's catalogue, with several hundred films coming in each month. When the Cinémathèque moved to a new location in 1982, the National Film Board of Canada donated most of the animated films that it had produced to the institution. The Cinémathèque also kept nearly 1000 scripts and agreed with the Société générale du cinéma in 1985 to receive all of its scripts three years after their releases. Between 1984 and 1988, France Film, Prisma Film, Jacques Lamoureux, Daniel Kieffer, and Bertrand Carrière all made significant donations of their photography to the institution.

In 1992, a donation made by Camille Moulatlet, technician for Radio Canada, significantly enriched the institution's collection of equipment with a contribution of 63 cameras and 200 projectors.

In 1994, the Cinémathèque officially expanded its mission to include television and thus decided to acquire programs produced by independent producers for its collections.

In the late 1990s, the Cinémathèque adopted acquisition politics according to which its collections would only accept donations, not deposits, and its film collections would no longer accept film positives and magnetic scraps, becoming more restrictive in terms of the types of production materials it would accept into its vaults (workprints, film negatives, etc.).

Moses Znaimer's donations between 2003 and 2007, composed of 289 old television sets, also marked an important moment in the Cinémathèque's collection of equipment.

In 2008, the Cinémathèque's mission was further expanded to include other new forms of media. Three years later, in 2011, the institution acquired the Centre de recherche et de documentation of the Daniel Langlois Foundation.
