= Michel Brault =

Canadian filmmaker

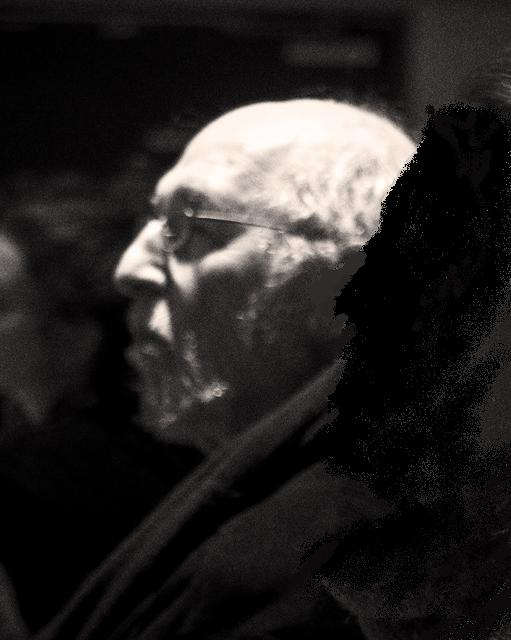
- Born: 25 June 1928; Montreal, Quebec, Canada
- Died: 21 September 2013 (aged 85); Toronto, Ontario, Canada
- Occupations: Cinematographer, film director, screenwriter
- Years active: 1958–2013

Michel Brault, OQ (25 June 1928 – 21 September 2013) was a Canadian cinematographer, cameraman, film director, screenwriter, and film producer. He was a leading figure of direct cinema, characteristic of the French branch of the National Film Board of Canada in the 1960s. Brault was a pioneer of the hand-held camera aesthetic.

== Career ==
His early cameraman work with Gilles Groulx on The Snowshoers (Les Raquetteurs), Claude Jutra's À tout prendre and Mon oncle Antoine, and Pierre Perrault's Pour la suite du monde virtually defines the look of classic Quebec cinema. He became involved with filmmaking while still at university and joined the National Film Board of Canada in 1956, working on the celebrated Candid Eye series. From 1961 to 1962 he was in France, where he worked with directors such as Jean Rouch and Mario Ruspoli and shot the influential Chronique d’un été with Raoul Coutard and others. In France, he is considered an originator and one of the purist practitioners of cinéma-vérité.

Brault returned to Quebec and the NFB but quit it in 1965 when Pierre Juneau, the director of French production, rejected his first fiction feature, Entre la mer et l'eau douce. He then enjoyed a successful freelance career in feature films, documentaries, shorts and television. His cinematography ranged from the gritty cinéma-vérité style of À tout prendre to the lyricism of Kamouraska, and his directorial work from the terse documentary stylings of La lutte to smoothly-proficient television dramas such as Les noces de papier, which was entered into the 40th Berlin International Film Festival. He won Canadian Film Awards for lensing Mon oncle Antoine and The Time of the Hunt (Le Temps d'une chasse), and Genie Awards for his work on Good Riddance (Les Bons débarras) and Threshold. Orders (Les Ordres) (1974), which he directed, shot, and wrote, won for him the CFA for direction and he shared the best director award at the 1975 Cannes Film Festival. The film seamlessly fuses documentary and fiction styles while dramatizing the trauma of innocent people caught up in the October Crisis of 1970. It is still regarded as a masterpiece of Canadian cinema.

== Death ==
Brault died of a heart attack on the afternoon of 21 September 2013 while en route to the Film North – Huntsville International Film Festival, where he was to receive a Lifetime Achievement Award. According to festival founder Lucy Wing, Brault had arrived at Pearson International Airport after a flight from his home in Montreal, accompanied by his son, Sylvain. Brault had begun the drive north to Huntsville by limousine when he began to feel ill approximately one hour after his arrival in Toronto. A ceremony of commemoration was held for Brault on 4 October 2013 at the Église Saint-Mathieu in Beloeil, Quebec. Among those present for this homage were the provincial premier, Pauline Marois, and Brault's leading lady from Entre la mer et l'eau douce, Genevieve Bujold.

== Personal life ==
His son, Sylvain Brault, is one of Quebec's top cameramen, and his daughter, Anouk, is a producer.

== Honours and distinctions ==
- 1964 - Film of the Year, Canadian Film Awards
- 1974 - Prix L.-E.-Ouimet-Molson
- 1975 - Prix Victor-Morin
- 1975 - Best Director, Canadian Film Awards
- 1975 - Best Director Award (Cannes Film Festival)
- 1980 - Molson Prize
- 1981 and 1983 Genie Award for Best Achievement in Cinematography (also nominated in 1988)
- 1986 - Prix Albert-Tessier
- 1990 - Best director prize at the Flanders International Film Festival
- 1993 - Prix Luce-Guilbeault
- 1996 - Governor General's Performing Arts Award
- 2003 - Prix Guy-L'Écuyer
- 2003 - Officer of the Ordre national du Québec
- 2005 - Prix Jutra lifetime achievement award
- 2013 - Bull's Eye Lifetime Achievement Award, Film North – Huntsville International Film Festival

== Selected films ==
Over the course of his career, Brault worked as a director or cinematographer on over 200 films. Some of the most notable of these films include:

Documentary

- Chèvres (Short film Co-Directed with Claude Sylvestre, 1954)
- La Mattawin, rivière sauvage (Short film Co-Directed with Claude Sylvestre, 1954)
- The Snowshoers (Les Raquetteurs) (Short film Co-Directed with Gilles Groulx, 1958)
- Eye Witness No. 101 (Documentary series Co-Directed with Grant Crabtree, 1958)
- Wrestling (La lutte) (Short film Co-Directed with Marcel Carrière, Claude Fournier and Claude Jutra, 1961)
- Québec-U.S.A. ou l'invasion pacifique (Short film Co-Directed with Claude Jutra, 1962)
- Les enfants du silence (Short film, 1962)
- Pour la suite du monde (Co-Directed with Marcel Carrière and Pierre Perrault, 1963)
- Le temps perdu (Short film, 1964)
- Conflicts (Short film, 1967)
- Settlement and Conflict (Short film, 1967)
- Le beau plaisir (Short film Co-Directed with Pierre Perrault and Bernard Gosselin, 1968)
- Les enfants de Néant (Short film, 1968)
- Éloge du chiac (Short film, 1969)
- René Lévesque vous parlez: les 6 milliards (Short film, 1969)
- Acadia, Acadia (L'Acadie, l'Acadie?!?) (Co-Directed with Pierre Perrault, 1971)
- René Lévesque pour le vrai (Short film, 1973)
- Le bras de levier et la rivière (Short film, 1973)
- René Lévesque: un vrai chef (Short film, 1976)
- Les gens de plaisir (Short film, 1979)
- Il faut continuer (Short film, 1979)
- Le p'tit Canada (Short film, 1979)
- A Freedom to Move (Short film, 1985)
- Campaign 1986 (Short film, 1986)
- Tu m'aimes-tu (Video, 1991)
- Ozias Leduc, comme l'espace et le temps (Short film, 1996)
- La manic (Short film, 2002)
- Une chanson qui vient de loin (portrait de Claude Gauthier) (Short film, 2008)

Fiction

- Matin - 1960 (short film)
- Geneviève - 1964 (short film, also released as part of the anthology film The Adolescents (La Fleur de l'âge, ou Les adolescentes))
- Between Salt and Sweet Water (Entre la mer et l'eau douce) - 1967
- Orders (Les ordres) - 1974
- Le son des français d'Amérique - 1974-1980 (TV series)
- La belle ouvrage - 1977-1980 (TV series)
- L'emprise - 1988 (short film)
- The Paper Wedding (Les noces de papier) - 1989 (TV movie)
- Diogène - 1990 (short film)
- Montreal Stories (Montréal vu par...) - 1992 (segment "La dernière partie")
- Shabbat Shalom! - 1992 (TV movie)
- My Friend Max (Mon amie Max) - 1994 (TV movie)
- The Long Winter (Quand je serai parti... vous vivrez encore) - 1999
- 30 vies - 2011 (TV series)

Cinematographer credits

- Chronique d'un été - 1961
- À St-Henri le cinq septembre - 1962
- Mon Oncle Antoine - 1971
- The Time of the Hunt (Le Temps d'une chasse) - 1972
- Kamouraska - 1973
- Before the Time Comes (Le Temps de l'avant) - 1975
- Good Riddance (Les Bons débarras) - 1980
- Beyond Forty (La Quarantaine) - 1982
- No Mercy - 1985
- The Great Land of Small - 1987
