= Jacques Bobet =

French filmmaker

Jacques Bobet OC (June 29, 1919, in Saumur, France – March 7, 1996, in Montreal, Canada) was a French filmmaker who played a key role in the National Film Board of Canada's move into French language filmmaking.

Following a brief stint teaching literature and philosophy in France, Jacques Bobet immigrated to Canada and joined the NFB in 1947 as a writer at a time when 90 percent of the staff was English-speaking and its French Unit found it hard to retain French Canadian filmmakers. Bobet worked to strengthen the French Unit and retain French talent, and was appointed producer of French versions in 1951. By 1956, when he was named executive producer of the newly created Versions Unit, he had been involved in versioning approximately 500 films. That same year, the NFB's headquarters was relocated from Ottawa to Montreal, improving the NFB's reputation in French Canada and making the NFB more attractive to French-speaking filmmakers. In 1959, Bobet assumed responsibility for producing more original French-language films. In 1964, a separate French production branch was finally established, with Bobet as one of the four executive producers.

He oversaw the production of some of the most important films made in Quebec during the 1960s: La lutte', The Cat in the Bag (Le Chat dans le sac), Pour la suite du monde, The Times That Are (Le Règne du jour) and The River Schooners (Les Voitures d'eau). His personal favourite was the mammoth project (more than 100 kilometres of film was shot) Games of the XXI Olympiad, the official film of the 1976 Montreal Olympics.

In 1982 Bobet was appointed head of NFB/private-industry co-productions, and in 1983 became executive producer of Studio C (French-language feature production). He retired from the board in 1984 but continued to teach and he co-wrote the script for The Tadpole and the Whale. Bobet once said the job of a producer was 'to do all those little things that you don't see in bringing a movie to the screen.'
