= Eye Witness (Canadian film series) =

Canadian current events film series, 1947-1958

- Country of origin: Canada
- No. of episodes: 101

Production
- Executive producers: Tom Daly (1947-1952); Nicholas Balla (1952-1958)
- Producers: Don Mulholland (1947-1950); Gordon Burwash (1951-1952; David Bairstow (1952-1954); Jack Olsen (1954-1955); Peter Jones (1956-1957); Tim Wilson (1957-1958)
- Running time: 9-12 minutes
- Production company: National Film Board of Canada

Original release
- Release: November 1, 1947 – February 1, 1958

Related
- Canada Carries On; Candid Eye

Eye Witness is a current events film series produced by the National Film Board of Canada that ran from 1947 to 1958. It ran concurrently in Quebec as Coup d'oeil.

In 1940, the National Film Board (NFB) created the morale-boosting propaganda series Canada Carries On, which was funded by the Wartime Information Board. When the war ended in 1945, the series lost its funding from that source, but the NFB continued with it until 1959.

At the time, Canada had a huge theatre-going public, and one theatre show would normally be a cartoon, a sponsored, promotional or informational film, and then the main feature. Canada Carries On was supplied for inclusion in the shows of all Famous Players theatres. In the mid-1940s, with heavy investment from The Rank Organisation of Britain, Odeon Cinemas came into being. It also needed content and, in 1947, the NFB answered with Eye Witness.

Eye Witness was less about propaganda and more about the NFB's mandate to show Canada to Canadians, and foster a greater sense of unity. It was also distributed by Columbia Pictures, which included Eye Witness in its international offerings. The show was issued monthly, with each reel lasting from nine to twelve minutes and, for the most part, containing three distinct stories. They were vignettes covering various aspects of Canadian life, and/or issues that Canadians cared about, and could take place anywhere in the country.

The show's first producer was Don Mulholland, who managed its difficult logistics by dispatching cameramen, rather than entire teams, to film stories. As time went on, and budgets were increased, production could include an entire crew. Until 1952, Lorne Greene was the narrator; from then on, narration was handled, mainly, by Budd Knapp, Fred Davis, Elwood Glover and Geoffrey Hogwood.

By 1958, an ever-increasing number of Canadians had televisions in their homes and theatres were running features. The NFB commissioner Guy Roberge cancelled Eye Witness and replaced it with the short-lived series Candid Eye.

== Episodes ==
=== 1947 ===
Number	Title	Director/Camera	Producer	Length
0	Shipping Milk to Europe, Tuna Fishing, Shipping Grain to Britain, Garden Seed Industry		Don Mulholland	11 min.
1	Chalk River, Industrialization in South Africa		Don Mulholland	11 min.

=== 1948 ===
Number	Title	Director/Camera	Producer	Length
2	Canada at the U.N. Security Council, Harvesting Hemlock in B.C.		Don Mulholland	10 min.
3	European Immigrants Arrive in Halifax, Population Explosion in Yellowknife		Don Mulholland	11 min.
4	Commercial Ice Fishing in Manitoba, Indian Health Service Doctor, Banff Winter Carnival, Barbara Ann Scott		Don Mulholland	13 min.
5	Mass Housing Construction in Ottawa, Logs Head to Pulp Mills		Don Mulholland	11 min.
6	Liberal Convention, Valleyfield Regatta		Don Mulholland	11 min.
7	Co-operative Commonwealth Federation, Antgonish Highland Festival		Don Mulholland	9 min.
8	Progressive Conservative Convention, Bird Dog Trials		Don Mulholland	11 min.
9	Mackenzie King Retires, Crossroads for Ducks, Whaling Begins Again on the British Columbia Coast, Pennies from Canada		Don Mulholland	15 min.
10	Gréber Plan, Terrace Bay, Floating Village		Don Mulholland	10 min.

=== 1949 ===
Number	Title	Director/Camera	Producer	Length
11	Classroom on Rails, Disabled Civilians Workshop		Don Mulholland	11 min.
12	The Opening of Canada's Parliament		Don Mulholland	20 min.
13	Lumber Tugs Buck Flood-Swollen Fraser, Spring Round-up in B.C.		Don Mulholland	10 min.
14	Man-Made Desert, Police Boys' Club		Don Mulholland	11 min.
15	Man-Made Niagara, Irrigation Revitalizes Dust Bowl, Underwater Harvest		Don Mulholland	11 min.
16	Art in the Park, Billions in Black Oil, The Friendly Tides of Fundy	Nathan Clavier, Gordon Burwash	Don Mulholland	11 min.

=== 1950 ===
Number	Title	Director/Camera	Producer	Length
17	Modern Magic with Liquid Air, Canada's Biggest Bird House, City Mobilizes for Crippled Children		Don Mulholland	11 min.
18	Salt Water Farmers Grow Fancy Crops, Regina Rainmaker, Springtime in the Sugar Bush		Don Mulholland	11 min.
19	Flying Farmers, Miser Makes Money for Others, Toronto Curbs Jay-Walkers feat. Edward Everett Horton, Landlubbers Become Salty Sailors		Don Mulholland	11 min.
20	Hunting the Rare Snow Goose, Slum Dwellers Get New Homes for Old, Mighty Men Match Muscle Magic		Don Mulholland	10 min.
21	B.C.'s Lady Legislator, Researchers Pave Skyways for Canada's Plane Makers, Cow Collects Currency, Then Caches Cash, Skiers Travel 5000 Miles to Challenge Famous Hill		Don Mulholland	11 min.
22	Alberta's Blood Indians, Music Master, Sky Sentries		Don Mulholland	11 min.
23	The Magic Isle in Toronto Bay, Nature Conscripted in War on Worms, Students Learn Lessons in the Sky	Grant McLean, Hector Lemieux, Maurice Constant	Don Mulholland	11 min.
24	The Fine Art of Making Money, Sable Island: Graveyard of the Atlantic, B.C. Develops Schoolboy Rangers	John Foster	Don Mulholland	11 min.
25	New Methods Feed the North, A Brain, a Voice - and Courage, From Ivy Walls to Sea and Squalls	Hector Lemieux, John Foster, Osmond Borradaile	Don Mulholland	11 min.

=== 1951 ===
Number	Title	Director/Camera	Producer	Length
26	Their Hobby Is Saving Lives, Diana Discovers the Drama, Man-Made Hades - The Steel Mill	Hector Lemieux, Lorne C. Batchelor	Gordon Burwash	10 min.
27	Halifax's Junior Bengal Lancers, Where the Big Ones Grow Bigger and Bigger, From Jobs and Schools to Swimming Pools, Alberta Blitzes Prairie Killers	Jean-Marie Couture, John Foster	Gordon Burwash	11 min.
28	New Look on Rails, Dedication to the Dance, Fun in Fur Land	Ron Weyman, Allen Stark, Gordon Burwash	Gordon Burwash	11 min.
29	Pied Piper of the Three R's, Radio Runs Water War, Church of the Open Road, Down-Under with Toronto's Subway Builders	Osmond Borradaile, Robert Humble, Lorne C. Batchelor, Jean-Marie Couture	Gordon Burwash	9 min.
30	Still Gold in Them Thar Hills, Canada's New State Residence, Sister Pelagie, Trapping the Sea Lamprey, Flying Fashions	Julien St-Georges, Lorne C. Batchelor, Jean Roy, Hector Lemieux	Gordon Burwash	11 min.
31	unknown			
32	Show World's Show Place, Nipissing's Net Prophet, Sarnia Unlimited	Hector Lemieux, Thomas Farley, Gordon Burwash	Gordon Burwash	11 min.
33	The Ship that Never Sails, Freedom Jamboree, A Metal Mountain	John Foster, Walter A. Sutton, Walford Hewitson	Gordon Burwash	11 min.
34	The Fireman Is a Grocer, Artistry in Clay and Cloth, Winter Morning	Grant McLean, Walford Hewitson, Hector Lemieux, Lorne C. Batchelor	Gordon Burwash	11 min.
35	The Lonely Age: Sixty, Operation Niagara, Weekend in Herring Neck		Gordon Burwash	11 min.

=== 1952 ===
Number	Title	Director/Camera	Producer	Length
36	Cosmic Clock, Downtown Mountain, Grand Champs	Gordon Burwash, John Foster, Hector Lemieux, Gil LaRoche, Roger Racine	Gordon Burwash	11 min.
37	Queer Careers, Defeating Delinquency, Tomorrow's Favourites		Don Mulholland	11 min.
38	Sea-Coast Service, White Water Highways, Fun and Fine Arts	Hector Lemieux, Walford Hewitson, E. Wilson	Gordon Burwash	11 min.
39	Riches to Burn, Old Art--New Mould, Arctic Lifeline	Walford Hewitson, Don Peters, John Spotton, Douglas Wilkinson Jean Roy	Gordon Burwash	11 min.
40	The Port of Flowing Grain, Modern Miracle: Surgery Is Safe, Home-Made Community	Walford Hewitson, Robert Humble	Gordon Burwash	11 min.
41	Sabres at the Ready, Midnight Sculptors, Crime Detection at the Double	Thomas Farley, Walford Hewitson	David Bairstow	11 min.
42	27th Canadian Infantry Brigade at Hanover	Grant McLean	David Bairstow	11 min.
43	Traffic Cops in Jumpers and Jeans, Gill Netters by the Dozen, A 'Canadien' in Paris	Walford Hewitson, Stanley Clinton, Jack Long, Grant McLean	David Bairstow	11 min.
44	Whittlers' Village, Flying Farmer, The Children's Own Hospital	Gil LaRoche, John Foster, Thomas Farley, Walter A. Sutton, John Spotton	David Bairstow	11 min.
45	Laval Keeps Up with the Times, Luxury Crop from Northern Lakes, Allied Airmen Train in Canada	Roger Blais, Lorne C. Batchelor, Walford Hewitson, Thomas Farley, Walter A. Sutton	David Bairstow	10 min.
46	Gadget Ship Aids Mariners, Canadian Soldiers See Normandy Today, Maple Leaf Gardens Merry-Go-Round	Thomas Farley, Walter Sutton, Grant McLean, Gordon Burwash, John Foster	David Bairstow	11 min.
47	Their Clinic's the World, Home on the Campus, The Plane that Beats the Bush	Grant McLean, Gordon Burwash, Walford Hewitson	David Bairstow	11 min.

=== 1953 ===
Number	Title	Director/Camera	Producer	Length
48	Modes by Mail, Sentinel in the Gulf, School for Test Pilots	Grant McLean, Gordon Burwash, Jean Roy, Jacques Giraldeau, John Foster	David Bairstow	10 min.
49	Backstage Artists, Bird Man of Grand Manan, The Looms That Crossed the Sea	Walford Hewitson, Lorne C. Batchelor, Thomas Farley, Walter A. Sutton, Gil LaRoche, John Spotton	David Bairstow	11 min.
50	The Glass Makers, Return of the Beaver, Uranium City	John Spotton, Stephen Greenlees, Gil LaRoche, Lorne C. Batchelor	David Bairstow	11 min.
51	Royal Ontario Museum Is a Popular Classroom, R.C.A.F. Teaches Wilderness Survival, Getting Together with Overseas Friends		David Bairstow	11 min.
52	Next Year's Newsprint on Its Way, Moppet Models	Jean Palardy, Hector Lemieux	David Bairstow	9 min.
53	Immigrants from Holland	Grant McLean	David Bairstow	11 min.
54	Ball Stars Start Young, An Auto a Minute, A Railroad Goes to Sea	Daryl Duke, Felix Lazarus, Jack Long	David Bairstow	11 min.
55	Indian Canoe Experts Shoot White Water, Low-Cost College Stresses Books, Not Buildings, Canada's First Five-Pin 'Grey Cup'	Stephen Greenlees, John Foster, Gordon Burwash	David Bairstow	11 min.
56	Scottish Shepherd Tries New Pastures, Outdoor Classrooms Help Children Catch Up, Canadian Experts Help Arab Farmers	Hector Lemieux, Ron Weyman, Grant McLean	David Bairstow	11 min.
57	Light Plane Armada Makes Friendly Invasion, Canada's Vegetable Garden Beats the Season, Canadian Experts Help Arab Farmers	Julian Biggs, Grant McLean	David Bairstow	11 min.
58	Canadian Works with U.N.'s Problem Refugees, Tractor Train Pushes Through Northern Wilderness	Ron Weyman, Grant McLean	David Bairstow	11 min.
59	Bridging the Gap, Ancient Art, Modern Sport, V.O.N.: Everybody's Nurse	David Bairstow	David Bairstow	11 min.
60	Tomorrow's Officers, This Unseen World, Scientists Uncover Prehistoric Alberta	Raymond Garceau, Lorne C. Batchelor, Maurice Constant, Jack Long	David Bairstow	11 min.

=== 1954 ===
Number	Title	Director/s	Producer	Length
61	R.C.A.F. Keeps Watch on the Moselle, New NATO Brigade Takes Up Position	Robert Humble, David Bairstow	David Bairstow	11 min.
62	All-Girl Chorus Makes Fine Music, First Cruise for a New Supply Ship	David Bairstow, Hector Lemieux	David Bairstow	11 min.
63	Veteran Steamer Ends Record Service, Inside Story of a Lady's Mink Coat	Jack Long, Walford Hewitson	David Bairstow	11 min.
64	A New Life for the Handicapped, Fishermen Hunt Battling Broadbills	Hector Lemieux, Walford Hewitson	Jack Olsen	11 min.
65	Old Glory Weather Station, Easter in Jerusalem	Hector Lemieux, Ron Weyman	Jack Olsen	11 min.
66	Canada Helps Pakistan Bridge the Gap of Centuries of Economic Adversity	Gordon Burwash	Jack Olsen	11 min.
67	Apprentices Learn While Building School, Aerial Attack on Spruce Budworm	Fernand Ménard, Robert Anderson	Jack Olsen	11 min.
68	Birth of a Book, Eskimos Work Arctic Coal Mine, Dispatch Riders Perform Cycle Capers	Walford Hewitson, Douglas Wilkinson, Peter Jones	Jack Olsen	11 min.

=== 1955 ===
Number	Title	Director/s	Producer	Length
69	Spanish Decoys Curious Ducks, Snowmobile: Winter Transport, Maid of the Mist	Grant Crabtree, Hector Lemieux	Jack Olsen	11 min.
70	Blessing of the Fleet, Canadian Singers Study Opera at La Scala	Allan Wargon, Ron Weyman	Jack Olsen	10 min.
71	Connie MacFarlane: Seaweed Scientist, Capilano Western Railroad Appoints New President, Arctic Stone Carvers	Grant Crabtree, Hector Lemieux, Jean Palardy	Jack Olsen	11 min.
72	The Salvation Army	William Davidson	Jack Olsen	11 min.
73	Musical Holiday, Arctic Easter	Peter Jones, Douglas Wilkinson	Jack Olsen	11 min.
74	Scientists of the Sea, Alcoholism: A New Approach	Jack Long, William Davidson	Jack Olsen	11 min.
75	Army Trains Student Cooks, R.C.A.F. Re-supplies Arctic Weather Stations	Grant Crabtree, Wilfred Doucette	Jack Olsen	11 min.
76	Valley of Contrasts, Noise!	Gordon Burwash, Peter Jones	Jack Olsen	11 min.
77	Eating Is Their Business, Face-off for Future Hockey Stars, Boom Town Settles Down	Stephen Greenlees, Grant Crabtree, Hector Lemieux	Jack Olsen	11 min.
78	Montrealers Take Molière to Paris, Sealing - Still a Dangerous Gamble	Bernard d'Aillencourt, Wilfred Doucette	Peter Jones	11 min.
79	Ferries, Tankers, Frigates: Made in Canada, Caviar Comes from Canada's Queerest Fish, New Aircraft Joins Maritime Command	Walter A. Sutton, Grant Crabtree, Hector Lemieux	Peter Jones	11 min.
80	Tired of Traffic? Try Motor Sport, John Furch: Glass Craftsman, Water Highway Supplies the North	Norman Klenman, Hector Lemieux	Peter Jones	11 min.
81	New Life for Ghost Town Miners, School for Frogmen	Alvin Goldman, Hector Lemieux	Peter Jones	11 min.
82	Canadian Artists In Paris, Dude Ranch Holiday	Felix Lazarus, Hector Lemieux	Peter Jones	11 min.

=== 1956 ===
Number	Title	Director/s	Producer	Length
83	Vancouver Turns Out Expert and Responsible Motorists	Hector Lemieux	Peter Jones	11 min.
84	Boy Pipers of the Black Watch, Consumers Unite to Solve Shopping Problems	Hector Lemieux, Tim Wilson	Peter Jones	11 min.
85	Designer Captures Canada on Fabric, School for Sailors	Walter A. Sutton, Grant Crabtree	Peter Jones	11 min.
86	Bar Mitzvah	Alvin Goldman	Peter Jones	15 min.
87	Winter Dogs Days, Steelworkers Go To Press	Walter A. Sutton, Alvin Goldman	Peter Jones	11 min.
88	The River Pilot - A Shepherd for Shipping, Featherland, Seminar on Skis	Grant Crabtree, Hector Lemieux	Peter Jones	11 min.

=== 1957 ===
Number	Title	Director/s	Producer	Length
89	Star Gazers Explore the Heavens, Science Exploits the Woodlot, Adventure Aboard a Brigantine	Peter Jones	Peter Jones	11 min.
90	Apple Garden of Québec, A Great Inventor Is Remembered	Maurice Blackburn, Grant Crabtree	Peter Jones	11 min.
91	A Quarter Century of Cellophane, Eagle Evangelist	Maurice Blackburn, William H. Carrick	Peter Jones	11 min.
92	Transport on Trial, Cape Breton's Contented Chairmaker	Hector Lemieux, Grant Crabtree	Peter Jones	10 min.
93	Inside the Trucking Business	Hector Lemieux	Peter Jones	11 min.
94	House of Straw, Acadian Artistry in Rugs, Gibraltar of America	Hector Lemieux, Grant Crabtree, Maurice Blackburn	Peter Jones	10 min.
95	How to Retire and Start Living, The Story of a Stamp	Hector Lemieux, Grant Crabtree	Peter Jones	11 min.
96	School Timetable Suits Rural Students, Where Old Dolls Never Die, Nothing Stops the Scoot	Tim Wilson, Hector Lemieux, Irving Dooh	Tim Wilson	10 min.
97	The Making of an Airline Stewardess	Hector Lemieux	Tim Wilson	10 min.
98	Beauty Makes Business, Meeting of Minds, McGill Winter Carnival	Hector Lemieux, Tim Wilson	Tim Wilson	10 min.

=== 1958 ===
Number	Title	Director/s	Producer	Length
99	Canada's Caribbean Campus, Playhouse in the Park	Hector Lemieux, Pierre Patry	Tim Wilson	10 min.
100	Water Safety with the R.C.M.P.	Irving Dooh	Tim Wilson	10 min.
101	Learning the Textile Trade, Island Heritage	Michel Brault, Grant Crabtree	Tim Wilson	10 min.
