= Don Mulholland =

Canadian producer and director (1910–1960)

- Born: 1 January 1910; Viola, Minnesota
- Died: 22 August 1960 (aged 50); Saint-Augustin, Côte-Nord, Quebec
- Occupations: Producer, director
- Years active: 1946–1960

Don Mulholland (1910-1960) was a film producer and director with the National Film Board of Canada (NFB). He was the NFB's first Director of Production, and the founding producer of the series Eye Witness. He was the first director to blend fiction and documentary, and is credited with shaping the course of Canadian film in the 1950s.

== Early life ==
Donald Colpitts Mulholland was born in Viola, Minnesota in 1910. It is unclear why or when he moved to Canada but, by 1936, he and his wife Ruth had built a house in Toronto's wealthy Forest Hill neighbourhood and he was working as an advertising executive. With the outbreak of World War II, Mulholland joined the Royal Canadian Air Force; when the war ended, he joined the National Film Board of Canada.

== Career ==
Mulholland was put to work making training films; these led him to make the award-winning short film Safe Clothing. In 1948, he became the first director to blend fiction with documentary when, using non-professional actors and locations rather than sets, he made R.C.M.P. File 1365 - The Connors Case, a dramatization of a real-life murder which achieved theatrical success.

In 1940, the NFB had created the series Canada Carries On, a highly successful newsmagazine created by Stuart Legg. The board decided to produce a second, similar, series, Eye Witness, and Mulholland was given the job of producing it. Eye Witness was a monthly series distributed, by Columbia Pictures, to theatres nationwide. Each 9-15-minute episode covered 3-4 topics, pertaining to various points throughout the country. Perhaps as a result of his training in advertising and the military, Mulholland was known to be ultra-efficient and clear-headed; the right person to coordinate the logistical and creative challenges of the show. Mulholland was its producer from its inception in 1947 through 1949 (the show ran until 1957); he was also simultaneously producing films for Canada Carries On.

In 1950, the NFB underwent a restructuring, which included improved procedures in staffing, financing and accounting, centralization, and modernization of facilities. It was deemed necessary that there should be one executive to manage overall production. There were two candidates: Mulholland and James Beveridge. Beveridge was a mild-mannered, friendly fellow who had been trained by John Grierson; Mulholland was an elegant, aloof boss known for his sharp tongue. Mulholland was chosen and became the NFB's first Director of Production.

There was a storm of protest; some people preferred to work under Beveridge, others didn't want any hierarchy at all. It was not long, however, before Mulholland won over his colleagues, particularly when the NFB announced that it would be moving its head office from Ottawa to Montreal. This was an unpopular decision and Mulholland led the fight against it. But when it became clear that the move would happen, he studied French and became the overall coordinator of the move.

Mulholland was also publicly accused of being a ‘Franchophobe’ who ignored French-language film production. The case actually appeared to be that, with limited budgets, he was following demand instead of trying to create it. In fact, most programming was released in French and, under Mulholland, Francophone filmmakers were kept very busy, particularly Bernard Devlin, Roger Blais, Jean Palardy, Hector Lemieux and Jacques Bobet.

It was also under Mulholland's supervision that such films as Royal Journey (1951), Neighbours (1952), The Romance of Transportation in Canada (1952), City of Gold (1957), The Living Stone (1958), Universe (1960), and a A Chairy Tale (1957) were produced. At the 9th Canadian Film Awards in 1957, Mulholland was presented with a special Genie Award for his "notable encouragement of creative Canadian film production". In 1964, John Grierson stated that the previous decade was the board's “most creative and productive”.

In 1958, Grant McLean became Head of Production. Mulholland was Director of Operations, Research, Planning, Industry Relations and Technical Services. His rise in the board has been called ‘meteoric’ and it was no secret that he hoped to become commissioner; he was deputy commissioner in all but name. But his ambitions were not to come to fruition. In 1958, he was diagnosed with cancer; he continued working but died in August 1960, at age 50.

== Filmography ==
National Film Board of Canada

- Falls - training film, 1946 - writer, director
- Handling - training film, 1946 - writer, director
- Machines - training film, 1946 - writer, director
- Organization - training film, 1946 - writer, director
- Safe Clothing – short film, David Bairstow 1946 - writer, producer
- Photo Canada - documentary short, 1946 - writer, director
- Winter Fair - documentary short, 1947 - writer, producer, director
- R.C.M.P. File 1365 - The Connors Case short film 1947 - writer, producer, director
- Eye Witness 0: Shipping Milk to Europe, Tuna Fishing, Shipping Grain to Britain, Garden Seed Industry - documentary short, 1947 - producer
- Eye Witness No. 1: Chalk River, Industrialization in South Africa - documentary short, 1947 - co-producer with Tom Daly
- Eye Witness No. 2: U.N Security Council, Harvesting Hemlock - documentary short, 1948 - producer
- Eye Witness No. 3: Immigrants Arrive in Halifax, Population Explosion in Yellowknife - documentary short, 1948 - producer
- Eye Witness No. 4: Commercial Ice Fishing, Doctor of the Indian Health Service, Barbara Ann Scott, Banff Winter Carnival - documentary short, 1948 - producer
- Eye Witness No. 5: Ottawa's Building Boom, Logs to Pulp Mills - documentary short, 1948 - producer
- Eye Witness No. 6: Liberal Convention, Valleyfield Regatta - documentary short, 1948 - producer
- Eye Witness No. 7: Co-operative Commonwealth Federation, Antigonish Highland Festival- documentary short, 1948 - producer
- Eye Witness No. 8: Progressive Conservative Convention, Bird Dog Trials - documentary short, 1948 - producer
- Eye Witness No. 9: Mackenzie King Retires, Crossroads for Ducks, Whaling Begins Again on the B.C. Coast, Pennies from Canada - documentary short, 1948 - producer
- Eye Witness No. 10: Gréber Plan for Ottawa, Terrace Bay Power Plant, Floating Village - documentary short, 1948 - producer
- Eye Witness No. 11: Classroom on Rails, Disabled Civilians Workshop - documentary short, 1948 - producer
- Eye Witness No. 12: Opening of Canada's Parliament - documentary short, 1949 - producer
- Eye Witness No. 13: Hauling Lumber on the Fraser River, Spring Lambs - documentary short, 1949 - producer
- Eye Witness No. 14: Man-Made Desert, Montreal Police Boys' Club - documentary short, 1949 - producer
- Eye Witness No. 15: Lobster Season in New Brunswick, Construction of the Des Joachims Hydro Plant, Irrigation Revitalizes Alberta Dust Bowl - documentary short, 1949 - producer
- Eye Witness No. 16: Art in the Park, The Friendly Tides of Fundy, Alberta's Oil Boom - documentary short, Gordon Burwash and Nathan Clavier 1949 - producer
- Canada Carries On: White Fortress - documentary short, Ron Weyman and Leslie McFarlane 1949 - producer
- Canada Carries On: What’s Under the Label - documentary short, Ron Weyman 1949 - producer
- Canada Carries On: Sight and Sound documentary short, Gudrun Parker and Nathan Clavier 1949 - producer
- Canada Carries On: Valley of Gold - documentary short, David Bairstow 1949 - producer
- Canada Carries On: Ballet Festival - documentary short, Roger Blais 1949 - producer
- Canada Carries On: Unto the Hundredth Generation - documentary short, Donald Fraser 1950 - producer
- Canada Carries On: Life Under a Leaf - documentary short, Ron Weyman 1950 - producer
- Old Songs, Young Hearts - documentary short, Gil LaRoche 1950 - producer
- Canada Carries On: Our Town Is the World - short film, Stanley Jackson 1950 - producer
- Canada Carries On: Cliff Hangers - documentary short 1950 - producer
- Canada Carries On: Hunters of the North Pole - documentary short, Nils Rasmussen 1950 - writer, producer
- Canada Carries On: Gentleman Jekyll and Driver Hyde - documentary short, David Bairstow 1950 - writer, producer
- Eye Witness No. 17: Modern Magic with Liquid Air, Canada's Biggest Bird House, Sudbury Mobilizes for Crippled Children - documentary short, 1950 - producer
- Eye Witness No. 18: Salt Water Farmers, Regina Rainmaker, Springtime in the Sugar Bush - documentary short, 1950 - producer
- Eye Witness No. 19: Flying Farmers, Miser Makes Money for Others, Toronto Curbs Jay-Walkers, Landlubbers Become Salty Sailors - documentary short, 1950 - producer
- Eye Witness No. 20: Hunting the Rare Snow Goose, Slum Dwellers Get New Homes for Old, Mighty Men Match Muscle Magic - documentary short, 1950 - producer
- Eye Witness No. 21: B.C.'s Lady Legislator, Researchers Pave Skyways, Cow Collects Currency, Norwegian Skiers Challenge Revelstoke - documentary short, 1950 - producer
- Eye Witness No. 22: Alberta's Blood Indians, Blind Piano Virtuoso Paul Doyon, R.C.A.F. 401 Squadron - documentary short, 1950 - producer
- Eye Witness No. 23: The Magic Isle in Toronto Bay, Nature Conscripted in War on Worms, Lessons in the Sky- documentary short, 1950 – producer
- Eye Witness No. 24: The Fine Art of Making Money, Sable Island: Graveyard of the Atlantic, B.C.'s Schoolboy Rangers - documentary short, 1950 - producer
- Eye Witness No. 25: New Methods Feed the North, A Brain, a Voice - and Courage, From Ivy Walls to Sea and Squalls - documentary short, 1950 - producer
- Royal Journey - documentary, David Bairstow, Roger Blais and Gudrun Parker 1951 - executive producer
- Eye Witness No. 37: Queer Careers and Unusual Occupations, Defeating Delinquency, Training B.C.'s Thoroughbreds - documentary short, 1952 - producer
- Anti-submarine Mortar Mark 10 - documentary short, 1955 - director
- Automation - documentary short, Clifford Brown 1960 - producer
