= David Bairstow (filmmaker) =

Canadian producer and director (1921–1985)

- Born: 27 April 1921; Toronto
- Died: 10 May 1985 (aged 64); Montreal
- Occupations: Producer, director
- Years active: 1946–1974

David Bairstow (1921–1985) was a Canadian producer and director and one of the most prolific filmmakers at the National Film Board of Canada.

Over the course of his career, he made 200 films, notably the critically-acclaimed Morning on the Lièvre (1961) as well as Royal Journey (1951) and Grierson (1973), both of which won the BAFTA Award for Best Documentary.

== Early life ==
David Steele Bairstow was born in Toronto in 1921, the only child of William Bairstow and Florence Steele, both of whom were immigrants—William from England, Florence from the United States. Bairstow successfully competed to attend University of Toronto Schools, and then went to University College, Toronto, graduating with an Honours degree in Sociology in 1944. In university, he was a member of the Sociology Club and the Historical Club, and was keenly interested in the arts. He was the Literary Director of the University College Literary and Athletic Society, through which he wrote and produced plays and musicals. He was a member of the Glee Club, the Music Club, the Victoria College Bob Committee and the Toronto Mendelssohn Choir. In 1946, he moved to Ottawa and joined the National Film Board of Canada.

== Career ==
Bairstow was placed in the NFB’s storied Studio B, where his first film, Safe Clothing, was an award-winning comedic short film about the importance of wearing appropriate clothing. He moved through the 1940s with a long list of documentaries, and then spent 1951 through 1957 making scientific films, and training films and sponsored documentaries involving the Royal Canadian Air Force and Royal Canadian Navy.

In the early 1960s, Bairstow became very interested in environmental issues. He believed that humans inadvertently disturb the environment when they try to control it. But as to solving the problem of pollution, he agreed with the government’s solutions; just after making Morning on the Lièvre, Bairstow made a film about the 'national disgrace' that was the heavily-polluted Ottawa River. In River with a Problem (1961), he and director Graham Parker proposed that state experts and scientists should solve the problems of the past. Their position was that government funding, specialist knowledge and waste management were vital to restoring the balance of nature, and that economic growth was not incompatible with environmental protection.

Bairstow’s views, and those of colleagues such as Parker and Larry Gosnell, though slightly different, had a tremendous impact on how nature was represented in NFB cinema. The approach became more sophisticated and journalistic, as interviews about the effects of pollution became spontaneous, and cinematographers equipped with lightweight gear could record instances of ecological destruction at a moment’s notice. In some cases, the camera mimicked the perspective of wildlife. These filmmakers often went off-script, looking at the root causes of environmental destruction without the blessing of the government or sponsors. Poison, Pests, and People (1960), illustrated that uses of nature, and solutions for pollution, had to be addressed based on individual communities, an approach that was new at the time.

In the mid-1960s, Bairstow worked with Laurence Hyde to produce a 13-film series on the traditional Inuit way of life, using footage of the Netsilik people of Pelly Bay, Nunavut to illustrate the tales told by Tuktu, a fictional elder.

In 1970, Bairstow spent a year producing films for the Australian Commonwealth Film Unit. Upon his return, now as Executive Producer of Studio B, he created the board’s Multiculturalism Program, which was seen as an innovative response to discursive racism and a way of increasing racial diversity among the NFB’s films. Some of the films to come out of this program are The People of the Book (Felix Lazarus, 1973), Kaszuby (André Herman, 1975), I've Never Walked the Steppes (Jerry Krepakevich 1975), Seven Shades of Pale (Les Rose, 1975), a 1977 trilogy from Beverly Shaffer—Gurdeep Singh Bains, Kevin Alec and Veronica, and three 1977 films from Albert Kish: Bekevar Jubilee, Our Street Was Paved with Gold, and Hold the Ketchup.

Bairstow also produced Who Were the Ones?, a Challenge for Change film directed by Mike Kanentakeron Mitchell for the NFB’s Indian Film Crew. His last two films, Tomorrow Is Too Late and the award-winning Oceans of Science were about fisheries depletion and species survival.

Bairstow retired in 1974 and died in Montreal in 1985. He was survived by his wife Frances and two sons.

== Filmography ==
National Film Board of Canada

- Safe Clothing - short film, 1946 - editor, director
- Building for Tomorrow - documentary short 1947 - director
- Abitibi - documentary short 1949 - director
- Valley of Gold - documentary short 1949 - director
- Gentleman Jekyll and Driver Hyde - documentary short 1950 - director
- Holiday at Waskesiu - documentary short 1950 - director
- Cadet Holiday - documentary short, 1951 - writer, co-director with Robert Humble and Douglas Wilkinson
- Shawinigan - documentary short 1951 - writer, director
- Royal Canadian Army Cadets - documentary short 1951 - co-director with Douglas Wilkinson
- Royal Journey - documentary 1951 - co-director with Gudrun Parker and Roger Blais
- Wings for N. A. T. O. - documentary short 1951 - director
- Powertown Story - documentary short 1952 - writer, director
- Horizons of Quebec - documentary short, Raymond Garceau 1952 - editor
- Eye Witness No. 40: Port of Flowing Grain, Surgery Is Safe, Home-Made Community, 1952 - producer, director
- Eye Witness No. 41: Sabres at the Ready, Midnight Sculptors, Montreal Crime Lab, 1952 - writer, producer, co-director with Thomas Farley
- Eye Witness No. 42: Royal Canadian 27th Infantry Brigade in Germany - documentary short, 1952 - writer, producer, director
- Eye Witness No. 43: School Safety Patrol, Gil Netters, Canadien in Paris, 1952 - writer, producer, director
- Eye Witness No. 44: Whittlers' Village, Flying Farmer, Children’s Hospital, 1952 - writer, producer, director
- Eye Witness No. 45: Laval Keeps Up, Northern Lakes Luxury Crop, Allied Airmen, 1952 - writer, producer, director
- Eye Witness No. 46: Gadget Ship, Canadian Soldiers See Normandy, Maple Leaf Gardens, 1952 - producer, director
- Eye Witness No. 47: WHO Clinic, Campus Home, Bush Plane, 1952 - producer, director
- Eye Witness No. 48: Mail Order, Sentinel in the Gulf, School for Test Pilots 1953 - director
- Eye Witness No. 49: Backstage Artists, Bird Man, Looms That Crossed the Sea, 1953 - producer, director
- Eye Witness No. 50: Glass Makers, Return of the Beaver, Uranium City, 1953 - producer, director
- Eye Witness No. 51: Royal Ontario Museum, R.C.A.F. Wilderness Survival, Overseas Friends, 1953 - writer, producer, director
- Eye Witness No. 52: Next Year's Newsprint, Moppet Models, Jean Palardy and Hector Lemieux 1953 - writer, producer
- Eye Witness No. 53: Immigrants from Holland, Grant McLean 1953 - producer
- Eye Witness No. 54: Little League, An Auto a Minute, A Railroad Goes to Sea, Daryl Duke, Felix Lazarus and Jack Long 1953 - producer
- Eye Witness No. 55: Indian Canoe Experts, Low-Cost College, Five-Pin Grey Cup, Stephen Greenlees, Gordon Burwash and John Foster 1953 - writer, producer
- Eye Witness No. 56: Scottish Shepherd, Outdoor Classrooms, Canadians Help Arab Farmers, Hector Lemieux, Ron Weyman and Grant McLean 1953 - producer
- Eye Witness No. 57: Light Plane Armada, Canada's Vegetable Garden, Julian Biggs and Grant McLean 1953 - producer
- Eye Witness No. 58: U.N.'s Problem Refugees, Tractor Train Through Northern Wilderness, Ron Weyman and Grant McLean 1953 - writer, producer
- Eye Witness No. 59: Bridging the Gap, Ancient Art; Modern Sport, Northern Wilderness, V.O.N., 1953 - producer, director
- Eye Witness No. 60: Tomorrow's Officers, This Unseen World, Prehistoric Alberta, 1953 - producer, director
- Eye Witness No. 61: R.C.A.F. on the Mosell, New NATO Brigade, 1954 - writer, producer, director
- Eye Witness No. 62: All-Girl Chorus, New Supply Ship d'Iberville, 1954 - writer, producer, co-director with Hector Lemieux
- Eye Witness No. 63: Veteran Steamer, Inside Story of a Lady's Mink Coat, Jack Long and Walford Hewitson 1954 - producer
- Dues and the Union - documentary short 1953 - director
- Highlights from Royal Journey - documentary short 1953 - co-director with Gudrun Parker and Roger Blais
- Aircrew - documentary short, Thomas Farley 1954 - executive producer
- Aviation Fuel Handling - documentary short 1954 - producer, director
- Basic Rescue No. 1 - Five Basic Knots - training film 1954 - co-producer and -director with Julian Biggs
- Basic Rescue No. 2 - The Use of Levers - training film 1954 - co-producer and -director with Julian Biggs
- Basic Rescue No. 3 - The Use of Jacks - training film 1954 - co-producer and -director with Julian Biggs
- Basic Rescue No. 4 - The Single Ladder - training film 1954 - co-producer and -director with Julian Biggs
- Basic Rescue No. 5 - The Extension Ladder - training film 1954 - co-producer and -director with Julian Biggs
- Flying Instruction Technique - training film, Thomas Farley 1954 - executive producer
- More Dollars in the Pasture - documentary short 1954 - producer, director
- Harvest in the Valley - documentary short, Larry Gosnell 1955 - executive producer
- Hybrid Corn - documentary short, Larry Gosnell 1955 - executive producer
- Raising the Hogs the Market Wants - documentary short, Julian Biggs 1955 - executive producer
- Anti-submarine Mortar Mark 10 - documentary short, Don Mulholland 1955 - producer
- The Automatic Radio Compass, Part I - documentary short, Frank Spiller 1955 - executive producer
- Daily Inspection Procedures for the T33 - documentary short 1955 - producer, director
- Early Handling of Spinal Injuries - documentary short, Walford Hewitson 1955 - producer
- First Aid for Aircrew - training film, Walford Hewitson 1955 - producer
- Navy Goes North - documentary short 1955 - producer, director
- Operation Eclipse II - documentary short 1955 - producer
- Road of Iron - documentary short, Walford Hewitson 1955 - producer
- Supply Depot to Flight Line - training film, Alvin Goldman 1955 - executive producer
- Prepare for Advancement - training film, William Davidson 1955 - executive producer
- Air Survey - documentary short 1956 - producer, director
- Chemical Conquest - documentary short, Larry Gosnell 1956 - executive producer
- The Flight Commander - training film, Thomas Farley 1956 - executive producer
- Crash Rescue and Fire Fighting - training film, Fergus McDonell 1956 - producer
- Emergency Rescue - T33 Jet Aircraft - training film, Terence Macartney-Filgate 1956 - producer
- Fish Spoilage Control - animated short 1956 - producer
- Gyro Steering - training film 1956 - producer
- H Bomb - documentary short 1956 - producer, director
- An Introduction to the Radio Range - training film, Frank Spiller 1956 - executive producer
- Methods of Instruction - training film Fergus McDonell 1956 - producer
- Arrival - short film, Donald Ginsberg 1957 - producer
- Aural Null - documentary short, Michael Birch and René Jodoin 1957 - producer
- The Automatic Radio Compass, Part II - training film, Michael Birch and René Jodoin 1957 - executive producer
- Battalion Intelligence Section - documentary short, Walford Hewitson 1957 - executive producer
- Mapping for Defence - documentary short, Lawrence Cherry and Michael Birch 1957 - executive producer
- The Standard Range Approach - training film, Michael Birch and René Jodoin 1957 - executive producer
- Coming to Single Anchor - training film 1957 - producer, director
- Aye Follow Your Own - short film, Julian Biggs 1957 - producer
- Birth of a Giant - documentary short Hugh O'Connor 1957 - producer
- Call it ... Rehabilitation - documentary short, Ernest Reid 1957 - producer
- First Adventure - documentary short 1957 - producer, director
- Flagged for Action - documentary short, Fergus McDonell 1957 - producer
- Flash Up - St. Laurent Class Ships: Parts 1 and 2 - documentary short 1957 - producer, director
- Honey Bees and Pollination - documentary short, Larry Gosnell and J.V. Durden 1957 - co-producer with Larry Gosnell and J.V. Durden
- Island Romance - short film, Donald Ginsberg 1957 - producer
- A Letter from Oxford - documentary short, Julian Biggs 1957 - producer
- Log Drive - documentary short, Raymond Garceau 1957 - producer
- Pierrot in Montreal - documentary short, Donald Ginsberg 1957 - producer
- The Salmon's Struggle for Survival - documentary short Walford Hewitson 1957 - producer
- Staff of Life - documentary short, Donald Ginsberg 1957 - producer
- The Two Kingstons - documentary short, Fergus McDonell 1957 - producer
- Conquest of Cold - documentary, Walford Hewitson 1958 - producer
- Evidence for the Crown - documentary short, Hugh O'Connor 1958 - producer
- First Novel - short film, Donald Wilder 1958 - producer
- The Golden Age - documentary short, Gordon Burwash 1958 - producer
- Home Landscaping - documentary short, Larry Gosnell 1958 - producer, director
- Journey from Etsa - documentary short, Julian Biggs 1958 - producer
- The Legendary Judge - documentary short, Donald Wilder 1958 - producer
- Men and Automation - documentary short, Donald Fraser 1958 - producer
- Men and Mechanization - documentary short, Donald Fraser 1958 - producer
- Neptune Mission - documentary short, Walford Hewitson 1958 - producer
- Northwest Neighbours - documentary short, Julian Biggs 1958 - producer
- One Day's Poison - documentary short, Donald Wilder 1958 - producer
- Ottawa, Canada's Capital - documentary short 1958 - producer, director
- People of the Peace - documentary short, Julian Biggs 1958 - producer
- River of Wood - documentary short, Raymond Garceau 1958 - producer
- School for the Stage - documentary short, Julian Biggs 1958 - producer
- The Story of H. M. S. Shannon - animated short 1958 - producer, director
- Student Nurse - documentary short, Donald Ginsberg 1958 - producer
- Tales out of School - animated short, Hugh O'Connor 1958 - producer
- The Ticket - documentary short Fergus McDonell 1958 - producer
- The Editor - short film, Donald Wilder 1958 - producer
- Train 406 - documentary short, Fergus McDonell 1958 - producer
- Western Brigade - documentary short, Fergus McDonell 1958 - producer
- 1,500,000 of Us - documentary short, Julian Biggs 1959 - producer
- Bacon - documentary short, Grant Crabtree 1959 - producer
- Canada - World Citizen - documentary short, Julian Biggs 1959 - producer
- Dykes for Dry Land - documentary short, Donald Wilder 1959 - producer
- Eternal Children - documentary short, Don Haldane 1959 - producer
- The Gifted Ones - documentary short, Don Haldane 1959 - producer
- Grassland Farming - documentary short, Donald Wilder 1959 - executive producer
- The Inquiring Mind - documentary short 1959 - producer, director
- The Mine Makers - documentary short, George Bloomfield 1959 - producer
- The Performer - documentary, Donald Ginsberg 1959 - producer
- Prairie Bonanza - documentary short, Julian Biggs 1959 - producer
- Report on Cancer - documentary short, Julian Biggs 1959 - producer
- Teamwork in Farm Research - documentary short, George Bloomfield 1959 - executive producer
- U. N. in the Classroom - documentary short Don Haldane 1959 - executive producer
- Automation - documentary short, Clifford Brown 1960 - producer
- Life and Radiation - documentary short, Hugh O'Connor 1960 - executive producer
- Men Against the Ice - documentary short 1960 - producer, director
- On Prescription Only - documentary short, Julian Biggs 1960 - producer
- Poisons, Pests and People - documentary short, Larry Gosnell 1960 - producer
- The Power of Matter - documentary, Graham Parker 1960 - producer
- Steering North - documentary short 1960 - producer, director
- This Electronic World - documentary short, Julian Biggs 1960 - producer
- The First Mile Up - documentary short, 1961 - writer, producer, director
- A Lake for the Prairie - documentary short, 1961 - writer, producer, director
- Morning on the Lièvre – short film, 1961 - editor, producer, director
- On Their Merit - documentary short, Donald Wilder 1961 - writer
- River with a Problem - documentary short, Graham Parker 1961 - writer, producer
- Henry Larsen's Northwest Passages - documentary short 1962 - producer, director
- The Early Journeys of Vilhjalmur Stefansson - documentary short 1963 - producer, director
- The Later Journeys of Vilhjalmur Stefansson - documentary short 1963 - producer, director
- Music from Montreal - documentary short 1963 - director
- Memories and Predictions - documentary short 1963 - producer, director
- Along Uncharted Shores - documentary short 1964 - producer, director
- Selections from the Christmas Oratorio by J. S. Bach - documentary short 1964 - director
- Alexander Mackenzie: The Lord of the North - documentary short 1964 - writer, director
- Autobiographical by A.M. Klein - documentary short, Richard Notkin 1965 - producer
- Instant French - short film, 1965 - writer, producer, director
- Judoka - documentary short, Josef Reeve 1965 - co-producer with Bernard Devlin
- Max in the Morning - documentary short 1965 - producer, director
- Long Ways to Go - short film, John Howe 1966 - producer
- Once upon a Prime Time - short film, Bernard Devlin 1966 - producer
- The Accessible Arctic - documentary short 1967 - producer, director
- The North Has Changed - documentary short 1967 - producer, director
- Tuktu and His Eskimo Dogs - documentary short, Laurence Hyde 1967 - producer
- Tuktu and His Animal Friends - documentary short, Laurence Hyde 1967 - producer
- Tuktu and the Big Kayak - documentary short, Laurence Hyde 1967 - producer
- Tuktu and the Big Seal - documentary short, Laurence Hyde 1967 - producer
- Tuktu and the Caribou Hunt - documentary short, Laurence Hyde 1967 - producer
- Tuktu and the Indoor Games - documentary short, Laurence Hyde 1967 - producer
- Tuktu and the Magic Spear - documentary short, Laurence Hyde 1967 - producer
- Tuktu and the Snow Palace - documentary short, Laurence Hyde 1967 - producer
- Tuktu and the Ten Thousand Fishes - documentary short, Laurence Hyde 1967 - producer
- Tuktu and the Trials of Strength - documentary short, Laurence Hyde 1967 - producer
- Tuktu and the Clever Hands - documentary short, Laurence Hyde 1967 - producer
- Tuktu and the Magic Bow - documentary short, Laurence Hyde 1967 - producer
- Tuktu and His Nice New Clothes - documentary short, Laurence Hyde 1967 - producer
- Twenty-four Hours in Czechoslovakia - documentary short 1968 - director
- City Limits - documentary short, Laurence Hyde 1971 - executive producer
- Total Approach - documentary short, Roger Blais 1971 - executive producer
- A Little Summermusik - documentary short, Bill Davies 1972 - executive producer
- Script to Screen - documentary short, Claude Delorme 1972 - co-producer with Daisy De Bellefeuille
- The Second Arctic Winter Games - documentary short, Dennis Sawyer 1972 - executive producer
- The Sunny Munchy Crunchy Natural Food Shop - documentary short, Richard Todd 1973 - producer
- Who Were the Ones? - documentary short, Mike Kanentakeron Mitchell 1972 - executive producer
- 28° Above Below - documentary short, Bané Jovanovic and Ken Page 1973 - executive producer
- A Great Little Artist - short film, Martin Defalco 1973 - producer
- Duty Free - short film, F. Whitman Trecartin 1973 - executive producer
- Grierson - documentary, Roger Blais 1973 - executive producer
- Our Street Was Paved with Gold - documentary short, Albert Kish 1973 - producer
- The People of the Book - documentary short Felix Lazarus 1973 - executive producer
- Oceans of Science - documentary short, Bané Jovanovic, Douglas Kiefer and Jean-Pierre Lachapelle 1974 - writer, producer
- Tomorrow Is Too Late - documentary short, Bané Jovanovic, Douglas Kiefer and Don Virgo 1974 - writer, producer

Australian Commonwealth Film Unit

- Better Pastures, Better Beef - documentary short, Alan Anderson 1970 -producer
- Paddington Lace - documentary short, Chris McCullough 1970 - producer
- Marsupials, Naturally - The Numbat - documentary short, John Shaw 1970 - producer
- Kangaroos - documentary short, John Shaw 1970 - co-producer with Joe Scully
- Kangaroos - Biography - documentary short, John Shaw 1970 - co-producer with Joe Scully
- Kangaroos - Varieties - documentary short, John Shaw 1970 - co-producer with Joe Scully
- Sheltered Workshops - documentary short, Kit Guyatt 1970 - producer
- Desert Landforms - documentary short, Keith Gow 1970 - producer
- Australian Geography: Faces of the City - documentary short, Malcolm Smith 1970 - producer
- Australian Geography: Urban Patterns - documentary short, Arch Nicholson 1970 - producer
- Australian Geography: Man in the Desert - documentary short, Edwin Moses and Keith Gow 1970 - producer

== Awards ==
Safe Clothing (1946)

- National Committee on Films for Safety, Chicago: Outstanding Non-Theatrical Motion Picture, 1949

Royal Journey (1951)

- 6th British Academy Film Awards, London: BAFTA Award for Best Documentary, 1953
- 4th Canadian Film Awards, Toronto: Best Theatrical Feature, Documentary, 1952

Aircrew (1954)

- International Sports Film Festival, Cortina d'Ampezzo: Diploma of Honour, 1956

Early Handling of Spinal Injuries (1955)

- Cleveland International Film Festival, Cleveland, Ohio: Certificate of Merit, Safety, Industrial and General, 1956

First Aid for Aircrew (1955)

- 8th Canadian Film Awards, Stratford, Ontario: Best Non-Theatrical Film, Government-Sponsored, 1956
- National Committee on Films for Safety, Chicago: Bronze Plaque/First Award, Institutional and Occupational, 1957

Road of Iron (1955)

- Kootenay Film Festival, Nelson, British Columbia: First Prize for Achievement, 1956

Harvest in the Valley (1955)

- 8th Canadian Film Awards, Stratford, Ontario: Honourable Mention, Non-Theatrical Film, Government-Sponsored, 1956

Fish Spoilage Control (1956)

- Golden Reel International Film Festival, Film Council of America, New York: Golden Reel, 1957

Log Drive (1957)

- Rapallo International Film Festival, Rapallo, Italy: Fourth Prize, Art Film, 1958

Flagged for Action (1957)

- National Committee on Films for Safety, Chicago: Bronze Plaque/First Prize, 1958

The Salmon's Struggle for Survival (1957)

- Okanagan Film Film Festival, Kelowna: First Prize, Science: 1958

One Day's Poison (1958)

- 11th Canadian Film Awards, Toronto: Award of Merit, TV Information, 1959

Eternal Children (1959)

- American Film and Video Festival, New York: Blue Ribbon, 1960
- Columbus International Film & Animation Festival, Columbus, Ohio - Chris Statuette, 1960

Morning on the Lièvre (1961)

- Berlin International Film Festival, Berlin: Silver Bear, 1961
- Edinburgh International Film Festival, Edinburgh, Scotland: Diploma of Merit, 1961
- 14th Canadian Film Awards, Toronto: Best Theatrical Short, 1962
- Boston Film Festival, Boston: Award of the Jury "For excellence in successful creative exploration of the film medium", 1962
- Columbus International Film & Animation Festival, Columbus, Ohio - Chris Statuette, 1962
- Festival of Tourist and Folklore Films, Brussels: Prize of the General Commission of France, 1963

Music from Montreal (1963)

- Columbus International Film & Animation Festival, Columbus, Ohio - Chris Certificate, Music, 1963

Autobiographical by A.M. Klein (1965)

- HEMISFILM, San Antonio TX: Honourable Mention - Bronze Plaque, 1968

Tuktu and the Indoor Games (1967)

- International Children's Film Exhibition, Venice: Silver Medal, 1969

Total Approach (1971)

- U.S. Industrial Film Festival, Chicago: Certificate of Creative Excellence, 1972

28° Above Below (1973)

- MIFED (Mercato internazionale del film e del documentario), Milan: Diploma and Trophy, 1974

Grierson (1973)

- 27th British Academy Film Awards, London: BAFTA/Robert Flaherty Award for Best Documentary, 1974
- 25th Canadian Film Awards, Montreal: Best Documentary (tied), 1973
- Festival of World Television, Los Angeles: Best Profile Documentary, 1973
- Golden Gate International Film Festival, San Francisco: First Prize, Personality, 1973
- Golden Gate International Film Festival, San Francisco: Bronze Reel Award for Third Best Film, 1973
- Melbourne Film Festival, Melbourne: Diploma of Merit, 1974

The Sunny Munchy Crunchy Natural Food Shop (1973)

- International Green Film Week, Berlin, Germany: Diploma of Merit, 1974

Tomorrow Is Too Late (1974)

- International Professional Fishing Film Festival, Marseille: Silver Fish, 1974

Oceans of Science (1974)

- International Documentary Film Days on the Environment, Ouistreham Riva-Bella: Honorable Mention, 1976
- International Science and Technology Film Contest, Tokyo: Bronze Prize, Higher Education, 1976
