= Jacques Giraldeau =

Canadian documentary filmmaker (1927–2015)

- Born: 16 July 1927; Montreal, Canada
- Died: 28 February 2015 (aged 87); Montreal, Canada
- Occupations: Director, cinematographer, animator, producer, writer, artist
- Years active: 1951–2007
- Awards: Prix Albert-Tessier 1996; Governor General's Award in Visual and Media Arts

Jacques Giraldeau (1927-2015) was a Canadian documentary filmmaker from Quebec. He spent most of his career at the National Film Board of Canada and became known primarily for his films about the history of Quebec as seen through the eyes of its artists. He had a fondness for the avant-garde and many of his films are considered to be experimental.

== Biography ==
Giraldeau was born and raised in Montreal, and studied sociology and philosophy at the Université de Montréal where, with Jacques Parent, he co-founded Quebec's first film club. He also co-founded the Student Film Commission, acted as editor of the magazine Découpages and contributed film criticism to the newspaper Le Front Ouvrier.

Upon graduation, Giraldeau moved to Ottawa and joined the National Film Board of Canada (NFB), where he became friends with Michel Brault. In 1953, he left the NFB and set up his own company, Studio 7, through which he produced programming for Radio-Canada (CBC Quebec), including the 39-episode series for young people, Petites Médisances, which he and Brault created in the Direct Cinema style—Giraldeau called it "image journalism". In 1962, he returned to the NFB and remained there until his retirement in 1995, returning in 2007 for an NFB co-production, The Fleeting Shadow of Things, which is one of his best-known films.

With Guy L. Coté, and others, Giraldeau co-founded the Association of Quebec Directors and, in 1964, the Museum of Canadian Cinema, a.k.a. "Cinémathèque Canadienne", which would become the Cinémathèque Québécoise. Also in 1964, Giraldeau organized North America's first international symposium on sculpture; the Montreal event became his award-winning film The Shape of Things.

At the 1995 International Festival of Films on Art, a formal tribute was paid to Giraldeau. It was also the occasion of the NFB's release of many of Giraldeau's films in a VHS compilation; an expanded, 13-DVD compilation was released in 2009.

In 1996, Giraldeau was awarded the Prix Albert-Tessier, the lifetime achievement award in cinema from the Quebec government's Prix du Québec. In 2000, the Canada Council awarded him the Governor General's Award in Visual and Media Arts

== Filmography ==
National Film Board of Canada

- La neige a neigé - documentary short 1951 - director, co-editor with Douglas Tunstell
- Monastery - documentary short, Roger Blais 1951 - writer, French script
- The Puppeteers - documentary short 1952 - director
- Eye Witness No. 48: Modes by Mail, Sentinel in the Gulf, School for Test Pilots 1953 - co-cinematographer with Gordon Burwash, Jean Roy, Grant McLean and John Foster
- The Gold Seekers (La soif d’or) - documentary short, Robert Russell 1962 - co-cinematographer with Gilles Gascon and Jim Wilson
- La soif d’or - documentary short, 1962 - directed the French version of The Gold Seekers
- Le vieil âge - documentary short 1962 - director
- Lonely Boy - documentary short, Roman Kroitor and Wolf Koenig 1962 - narrator (French)
- Lewis Mumford on the City, Part 3: The City and Its Region - documentary short 1963 - co-cinematographer and co-director with 8 others
- Lewis Mumford on the City, Part 4: The Heart of the City - documentary short 1963 - co-cinematographer and co-director with 15 others
- Lewis Mumford on the City, Part 5: The City as Man’s Home - documentary short 1963 - co-cinematographer and co-director with 6 others
- Lewis Mumford on the City, Part 6: The City as Man’s Home - documentary short 1963 - co-cinematographer and co-director with 13 others
- Down Through the Years - documentary short 1964 - writer, director
- Le diable est dans la ferme - short film, Hubert Fielden 1964 - co-producer with Jacques Bobet
- The Shape of Things - documentary short 1965 - writer, director, co-editor with Marc Beaudet
- Give Me a Hand - short film 1965 - editor, director
- Element 3 - documentary 1966 - writer, director
- Gros-Morne - documentary 1967 - director
- Les fleurs c'est pour Rosemont - documentary 1969 - director
- We Are All... Picasso! - documentary 1969 - director
- Faut-il se couper l'oreille? - documentary short 1970 - director
- Zoopsie - experimental short 1973 - writer, editor, animator, producer, director
- La fougère et la rouille ou Collage 2 - documentary 1974 - director
- Puzzle - animated short 1976, writer, animator, director
- La Toile d'araignée - documentary feature 1979 - photography, graphics, writer, director, co-cinematographer with Thomas Vámos and Pierre Mignot, co-producer with Marc Beaudet
- A Québécois Rediscovered: Joseph Légaré 1795-1855 - Raymond Brousseau 1980 - producer
- Opéra zéro - animated short 1984 - animator, director
- Moving Picture - short film 1988 - writer, director
- Le Tableau noir - documentary feature 1989 - director
- La Toile blanche - documentary feature 1989 - director
- The Irises - animated short 1991 - co-director with Suzanne Gervais
- Les amoureux de Montréal - documentary feature 1992 - writer, cinematographer, director
- Blanc de mémoire - documentary feature 1995 - director
- The Fleeting Shadow of Things - documentary feature 2007 - writer, cinematographer, director, co-producer with Yves Bisaillon

Studio 7

- Petites Médisances - TV series, 39 episodes, 1954-1955 - producer and director
- Les Bateaux de Neige - TV film 1956 - director
- En Roulant Ma Boule - short film 1956 - cinematographer, director
- Viendra le Jour - short film 1957 - producer, director

== Awards ==
- Les Bateaux de neige (1956)

12th Canadian Film Awards, Toronto: Best Film, Arts and Experimental, 1960

- The Shape of Things (1965)

Festival of Cultural Films, La Felguera: Silver Panera – Best Documentary Film, 1966

- Element 3 (1966)

Electronic, Nuclear and Teleradio Cinematographic Review, Rome: Grand Prize for Cinematographic Technique 1967
Salerno Film Festival, Salerno: First Prize – Trophy of the Festival, 1970

- We Are All... Picasso! (1969)

Venice Film Festival, Venice: Bronze Medal, Films on Art, 1970
National Festival of Films about Art, National Museum in Kielce Poland, Second Prize, 1972

- Moving Picture (1988)

International Association of Printing House Craftsmen, Montreal: Gutenberg Award, First Prize, 1988

- The Irises (1991)

Montreal World Film Festival, Montreal: Jury Award, Short Films, 1991

- Blanc de mémoire (1995)

Hot Docs Canadian International Documentary Festival, Toronto: Best Direction, 1996
