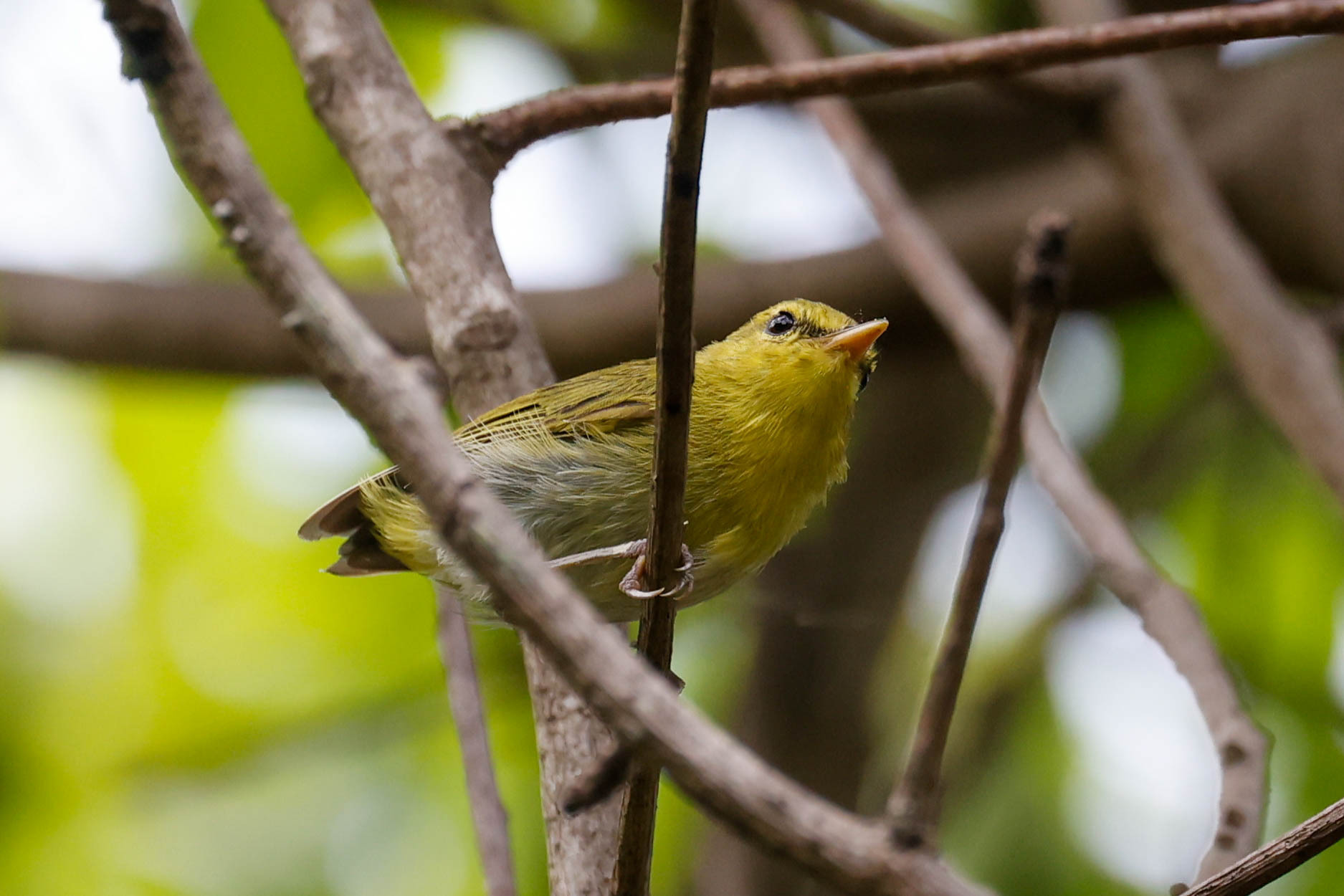

Conservation status
- Least Concern (IUCN 3.1)

Scientific classification
- Kingdom: Animalia
- Phylum: Chordata
- Class: Aves
- Order: Passeriformes
- Family: Phylloscopidae
- Genus: Phylloscopus
- Species: P. laurae

Binomial name
- Phylloscopus laurae (Boulton, 1931)

= Laura's woodland warbler =

Species of bird

Laura's woodland warbler (Phylloscopus laurae) is a species of Old World warbler in the family Phylloscopidae. It is found in Angola, Democratic Republic of the Congo, Tanzania, and Zambia. It is named in honour of Laura Boulton, an American ethnomusicologist.

Its natural habitats are subtropical or tropical dry forests and subtropical or tropical swamps.
