= Target - Berlin =

- DVD cover art
- Directed by: Ernest Borneman
- Written by: Leslie McFarlane
- Produced by: Raymond Spottiswoode
- Narrated by: Lorne Greene
- Cinematography: Grant McLean; Samuel Orleans; Donald Fraser; Gordon Fraser; (sound)
- Music by: Louis Applebaum
- Production company: National Film Board of Canada
- Distributed by: Columbia Pictures of Canada
- Release date: 1944
- Running time: 15 minutes
- Country: Canada
- Language: English

Target - Berlin is a 15-minute 1944 Canadian documentary film, made by the National Film Board of Canada (NFB) as part of the wartime Canada Carries On series. The film was produced by Raymond Spottiswoode and directed by Ernest Borneman, from a story by Leslie McFarlane, based on the industrial production of the Avro Lancaster in Canada, from initial production to the first example taking part in a raid on Berlin. The film's French version title was Objectif Berlin.

== Synopsis ==
In 1942, the Victory Aircraft company in Canada received notice that the Avro Lancaster heavy bomber would be built at their Malton, Ontario factory. After creating a supply chain of materials and components that can be obtained through Canadian sources, the factory ramps up by hiring nearly 10,000 workers and providing the specialized training and equipment necessary to turn out the largest aircraft ever produced in Canada.

When the blueprints arrive on microfilm, the factory begins to train the toolmakers needed to manufacture the 55,000 components to build the first Canadian prototype Lancaster, Coded KB700 and named the "Ruhr Express". The bomber rolled out to much publicity. After its maiden flight by an all-Canadian Royal Canadian Air Force (RCAF) flight crew, the "Ruhr Express" takes off for England. Completing its ferry mission successfully, the Canadian Lancaster joins an operational squadron preparing for a raid on Berlin.

The harrowing mission undertaken by the "Ruhr Express" is relayed all the way back to the Victory factory where workers pause to hear a radio broadcast of the Berlin attack. Despite heavy anti-aircraft fire, the Canadian Lancaster and its crew successfully complete their bombing mission.

== Production ==
Typical of the NFB's Canada Carries On series of documentary short films, Target - Berlin incorporated filming at the Victory plant with combat footage from overseas. The film was "... aimed at giving Canadians a sense of pride in their new industrial capacity, in particular, to build the big Lancaster bomber which would bring Germany to its knees through bombing raids on its cities. The challenge of finding workers, particularly toolmakers, to produce the 55,000 parts needed to produce this splendid weapon was integrated with dramatic footage of a raid punctuated by the savage sounds of anti-aircraft guns and exploding bombs." Relying heavily on the cooperation of the Royal Canadian Air Force, additional combat footage came from the Royal Air Force and the United States Army Air Forces.

Future NFB director and producer Grant McLean was the cinematographer on the documentary, later filming aboard the "Ruhr Express" on its bombing mission over Berlin.

Also notable was the involvement of composer Louis Applebaum whose martial score at times, merged "industrial noise" with symphonic music. He "... integrated with dramatic footage of a raid punctuated by the savage sounds of anti-aircraft guns and exploding bombs. By this point, Louis had learned how to use industrial noise along with the roaring sound of war machines, but his music was mainly martial in nature — a glorious fanfare when the first Lancaster emerged from the hangar, a brass accompaniment as the first plane struggled into the sky, and a string intervention to signal the soaring triumph of successful flight. Louis had learned how to reach the emotional needs of his audience."

== Reception ==
As part of the Canada Carries On series, Target - Berlin was produced in 35 mm for the theatrical market. Each film was shown over a six-month period as part of the shorts or newsreel segments in approximately 800 theatres across Canada. The NFB had an arrangement with Famous Players theatres to ensure that Canadians from coast-to-coast could see them, with further distribution by Columbia Pictures.

After the six-month theatrical tour ended, individual films were made available on 16 mm to schools, libraries, churches and factories, extending the life of these films for another year or two. They were also made available to film libraries operated by university and provincial authorities. A total of 199 films were produced before the series was canceled in 1959.

Film historian Malek Khouri in his book, Filming Politics: Communism and the Portrayal of the Working Class at the National Film Board of Canada, 1939-46, saw significant parallels to the NFB's Keep 'em Flying (1942) and Ferry Pilot (1942) that also showed the vital part that aircraft workers played in the war effort. "The film describes how the plane's construction relies on the work of an army of 'thousands of people'. Once again, the emphasis is on the collective contribution made by working people in different stations of work."

Scenes from Target - Berlin later appeared in Brian McKenna's Death by Moonlight: Bomber Command (1991). Target - Berlin is also available in DVD format from the NFB.
