= Royal Journey =

- Film poster
- Directed by: David Bairstow; Gudrun Parker; Roger Blais
- Written by: Leslie McFarlane
- Produced by: Tom Daly; Don Mulholland (exec.)
- Starring: The Princess Elizabeth; Philip, Duke of Edinburgh
- Narrated by: Elwood Glover
- Cinematography: Osmond Borradaile; Grant McLean
- Edited by: Ronald Dick; Victor Jobin; Betty Brunke
- Music by: Louis Applebaum
- Production company: National Film Board of Canada
- Release date: 21 December 1951 (Ottawa)
- Running time: 54 mins.
- Country: Canada
- Language: English

Royal Journey is a 1951 National Film Board of Canada documentary chronicling a five-week Royal visit by The Princess Elizabeth (later Queen Elizabeth II) and her husband, The Duke of Edinburgh, to Canada and the United States in the fall of 1951.

Directed by David Bairstow, Gudrun Parker and Roger Blais and produced by Tom Daly, it won the 1953 BAFTA Award for Best Documentary, and the Best Feature-Length Documentary award at the 1952 Canadian Film Awards. It is also notable for being the first commercial feature film in Eastmancolor.

Royal Journey features sequences from Quebec City, the National War Memorial in Ottawa, RCAF Station Trenton and a performance of the Royal Winnipeg Ballet, as well as sequences in Toronto, Regina, Saskatchewan, Calgary, and Edmonton.

The film also shows the couple crossing the Rocky Mountains by rail and making stops in several towns. In Vancouver, they board HMCS Crusader then attend native dances in Victoria's Thunderbird Park. The action then briefly shifts to the U.S., where they are welcomed by President Harry S. Truman. The remainder of the journey includes visits to Montreal, the University of New Brunswick in Fredericton, Halifax, Charlottetown, a steel mill in Sydney and, finally. Portugal Cove, Newfoundland.

In 1953, the NFB released Highlights from Royal Journey, a 22-minute reel of highlights from the film.

== See also ==
- A Queen Is Crowned
