= Northland (film) =

- Directed by: Ernest Borneman
- Cinematography: Ernest Wilson
- Release date: 1942
- Running time: 20 min.
- Country: Canada

Northland is a brief (approximately 20 minutes running time) 1942 Canadian documentary film on the life of miners, which was directed by the expatriate German crime writer, jazz critic, jazz musician, and sexologist Ernest Borneman. It is a production of the National Film Board of Canada.
