= Grierson (film) =

- Directed by: Roger Blais
- Written by: Donald Brittain
- Produced by: Roger Blais; David Bairstow
- Narrated by: Michael Kane (English); Monique Miller (French); Donald Brittain
- Cinematography: Eugene Boyko; Jacques Fogel; Lewis McLeod; Michel Thomas-d'Hoste; Magí Torruella; Raymond Dumas (animation camera)
- Edited by: Annick de Bellefeuille; Les Halman; John Kramer; André Galbrand (sound); Bernard Bordeleau (sound)
- Production company: National Film Board of Canada
- Release date: 1973
- Running time: 58 minutes
- Country: Canada
- Languages: English; French
- Budget: $242,725

Grierson is a 1973 documentary directed by Roger Blais for the National Film Board of Canada (NFB). It won, among other awards, the 1974 BAFTA Award for Best Documentary.

John Grierson, who is known as the father of documentary film and coined the term 'documentary', became the first Canadian Government Film Commissioner, and founded the NFB, in 1939. He believed that filmmakers have a social responsibility, and that film should help society realize democratic ideals. His faith in the value of capturing everyday life influenced generations of filmmakers all over the world.

Grierson, which cost $242,725 (equivalent to $1,688,790 in 2025) to make, includes archival footage and interviews with Grierson and people who knew him. It was released in English and French, with commentary by Donald Brittain; the English version was narrated by Michael Kane, the French version by Monique Miller.

== Awards ==
- 27th British Academy Film Awards, London: BAFTA Award for Best Documentary, 1974
- 25th Canadian Film Awards, Montreal: Best Documentary (tied), 1973
- Festival of World Television, Los Angeles: Best Profile Documentary, 1973
- Golden Gate International Film Festival, San Francisco: First Prize, Personality, 1973
- Golden Gate International Film Festival, San Francisco: Bronze Reel Award for Third Best Film, 1973
- Melbourne Film Festival, Melbourne: Diploma of Merit, 1974

== Works cited ==
- Evans, Gary (1991). In the National Interest: A Chronicle of the National Film Board of Canada from 1949 to 1989. University of Toronto Press. ISBN 0802027849.
