= The Face on the Cutting-Room Floor =

1937 crime novel by Ernest Borneman writing as Cameron McCabe

- First edition
- Author: Cameron McCabe
- Language: English
- Genre: Mystery fiction
- Publisher: Victor Gollancz Ltd
- Publication date: 1937
- Publication place: United Kingdom
- Media type: Print (Hardback & Paperback)
- OCLC: 15617413

The Face on the Cutting-Room Floor is a 1937 crime novel by Ernest Borneman writing as Cameron McCabe. It was first published in London. The book makes use of the false document technique: It pretends to be the true story of a 38-year-old Scotsman called Cameron McCabe who writes about a crucial period of his own life, during which several people close to him are murdered.

== Plot introduction ==
Borneman began working on his first novel shortly after arriving in England from Nazi Germany in 1933 with practically no command of the English language. However, he was a quick learner, considered the detective story he was writing "no more than a finger exercise on the keyboard of a new language", and had finished it when he was not yet 20 years old.

=== Explanation of the novel's title ===
The proverbial "face on the cutting room floor" is a character in a movie who, after the shooting is completed, is completely removed from the film, for whatever reason. The same idea also holds true for documentaries, where in the editing process the large amount of raw footage is cut down to a manageable size and where it can happen that a particular part of the film is completely removed from the final version.

== Plot summary ==
The novel, written in the first person in the form of Cameron McCabe's confession, is set in London in the mid-1930s. McCabe works in the film industry and has made himself a name as a supervising film editor working mainly on feature films. One day his boss, Isador Bloom, orders him to cut out altogether a young aspiring actress, Estella Lamare, from a movie which has just been produced. As the picture is about a love triangle McCabe does not see the point in doing as he was told and immediately suspects some foul business. He does not know then that this is in fact Bloom's revenge on Lamare for "showing him a cold shoulder" when he made a pass at her.

One Friday morning soon afterwards, Lamare's body is found on the floor of John Robertson's workplace at the studio, which happens to be a state-of-the-art cutting room. The place is equipped with an automatic camera which, once it has been set, starts recording the moment the door to the room is opened. Estella Lamare has died from stab wounds, and although the roll of film showing her slow death can be found it cannot be decided exactly how she died. On the film Ian Jensen, her partner in her last movie (from which she was to be cut out), can be seen struggling with Lamare, but the cause of her death may have been either an accident or suicide, or murder.

As Jensen is nowhere to be found Scotland Yard assumes that he is Lamare's murderer and that he has escaped to his native Norway. However, four days later, on December 3, 1935, his body is found in a shabby rented room in a cheap boarding house in London. Jensen has been poisoned and then, after his death, shot in the head.

The police investigations are conducted by Detective Inspector Smith of Scotland Yard. Right from the start there is antagonism between Smith and McCabe: Each suspects the other of knowing more about the case than he admits, with McCabe repeatedly assuming the role of detective while Smith seemingly has no idea how to solve the crime. Eventually the confrontation between the two antagonists escalates—their "game" turns into a "fight"—when Smith has McCabe arrested for the murder of Ian Jensen. McCabe refuses to be represented by a lawyer during his trial ("a layman conducting his own defence"), and systematically tries to break down the case against his person and to win over the jury to his cause.

In the course of the trial a number of facts about the people involved in the two deaths are revealed. For example, we learn that McCabe himself is a "morally uprooted" man who has replaced "eternal values" with "values of the moment". Until his arrest he has a relationship with Maria Ray, the actress who, together with Lamare and Jensen, forms the love triangle in the recently completed film. Although Maria Ray is the love of his life, McCabe cannot help starting an affair with Dinah Lee, his secretary, and, by carrying on two relationships at the same time, double-crossing both women. In his defence he even goes so far as to use Ray's own promiscuity—she has had affairs with both McCabe and Jensen—to question her credibility as a witness for the prosecution. He also insinuates that Smith has used doctored evidence to build up his case against him.

The members of the jury are impressed, pronounce a verdict of "Not guilty", and McCabe is acquitted. Smith now turns out to be a policeman who cannot lose but who actually loses his job as a result of McCabe's acquittal. When McCabe eventually tells him that he is Jensen's murderer after all it is because he realizes that he has irrevocably lost Maria (as well as Dinah), who would not even speak to him on the phone, and that there is not anything left in this world that might keep him alive. Now that he has written his story down for posterity he no longer minds being the target of Smith's revenge, who thinks McCabe's belated confession is the last straw. McCabe posts his manuscript to an old journalist called A.B.C. Müller whose acquaintance he has recently made and immediately afterwards is found shot. Smith is arrested, tried, and hanged.

With Cameron McCabe dead, the addressee of his manuscript continues the narrative, a part of the book which is entitled "An Epilogue by A.B.C. Müller as Epitaph for Cameron McCabe". Müller sees to the proof reading and the publication of The Face on the Cutting-Room Floor and becomes an avid collector of reviews of the book, comparing it with the fiction of Hemingway, Dashiell Hammett, and even James Joyce. At the same time he deplores, and condemns, the "arrested development of the criminal mind", in particular of course McCabe's.

One day in London Müller bumps into Maria Ray, whom he has not seen again since the trial, and they have a talk. To Müller's surprise, she claims that McCabe committed suicide—as an act of revenge, in order to get Smith convicted for murder. She also tells Müller that Smith was in love with her. At the end of the novel, Müller on the spur of the moment wants to propose to Maria Ray but then decides instead to "shoot her dead".

Thus, in Borneman's novel, Estella Lamare is "the face on the cutting-room floor", both literally and metaphorically.

== Characters in "The Face on the Cutting-Room Floor" ==
- Cameron McCabe – hardworking film editor
- Estella Lamare – a young aspiring actress
- John Robertson – who has a cutting room where the victim is found
- Isador Bloom – whom McCabe works for
- Ian Jensen – Lamare's co-star
- Inspector Smith – Detective from Scotland Yard
- Maria Ray – the actress who, together with Lamare and Jensen, forms the love triangle in the film

== Literary significance and criticism ==
When the book was eventually published in 1937, traditionalists and purists of crime fiction felt rather cheated while critics and reviewers such as Milward Kennedy, E. R. Punshon, Ross McLaren and Sir Herbert Read liked the novel for its ingenuity ("a detective story with a difference"). Eric Partridge considered it a mine of information on contemporary English slang and quoted extensively from it in his dictionaries. The Face on the Cutting-Room Floor saw eight reprints in various pocket editions and also appeared in French and German translations but was never brought out in the United States.

Forgotten for decades, Borneman's first novel was rediscovered in the 1960s by Ordean A. Hagen, who praised it as one of the milestones of crime fiction in his Who Done It?. In the early 1970s Julian Symons, in his history of crime fiction entitled Bloody Murder, famously referred to The Face as "the detective story to end detective stories".

However, the identity of the author was a mystery itself. Neither Symons nor the Gollancz publishing house knew anything about a Cameron McCabe, not even whether he was still alive or not. Accordingly, when Gollancz brought out their 1974 facsimile edition, only a few months after Symons had mentioned the novel, they advertised for McCabe's heirs and placed the royalties in a trust fund.

Two months later, still in 1974, Julian Symons reviewed the Gollancz reprint, revealing, after some research, the real name of the author as a certain Ernst Wilhelm Julius Bornemann, a man about whom he said he knew nothing except his name ("More information from readers would be welcome"). Another reviewer, British novelist and screenwriter Frederic Raphael, also admitted having no idea who the author was. Only then was it found out that Bornemann was the Borneman, the famous sexologist who was alive and well, living in the small Austrian village of Scharten, and teaching at several universities both in Austria and his native Germany.

== Release details ==
There have been four important editions of The Face on the Cutting-Room Floor:

1. the first edition, published in 1937 by Victor Gollancz Ltd with their trademark bright yellow dust jacket;
2. a 1974 facsimile reprint by Gollancz of their 1937 edition;
3. a 1981 edition by Gregg Press (a division of G. K. Hall & Co.), Boston, containing an extensive Afterword which includes the typescript of a long interview with Borneman conducted in 1979 by Reinhold Aman, the editor of the scholarly U.S. periodical Maledicta (Waukesha, Wisconsin); and, finally,
4. a 1986 Penguin edition (in the "Classic Crime" series), which also includes the Afterword of the 1981 edition (ISBN 0-14-008085-6).

== Read on ==
- Francis Iles's Malice Aforethought (1931) is a psychological thriller where the identity of the murderer is revealed right at the beginning of the novel and where the reader is granted insight into the workings of a criminal mind.
- Freeman Wills Crofts's The 12.30 from Croydon (1934) is written in a similar vein, with the protagonist awaiting trial but unable to assess his chances of being acquitted.
- Raymond Postgate's Verdict of Twelve (1940) is a mystery novel that draws on the author's socialist beliefs to set crime, detection and punishment within a broader social and economic context.
- Budd Schulberg's What Makes Sammy Run? (1941) looks behind the scenes of the film industry and of individual people working in that business in Hollywood rather than England.
- Ben Elton's Dead Famous (2001) is another example of a story where a murder is captured on film while the identity of the perpetrator remains in the dark, here in a late 20th-century Big Brother-type reality television setting.
