= Face the Music (film) =

1954 British crime drama by Terence Fisher

- American Theatrical release poster
- Directed by: Terence Fisher
- Screenplay by: Ernest Borneman
- Based on: Face the Music (novel) by Ernest Borneman
- Produced by: Michael Carreras
- Starring: Alex Nicol; Eleanor Summerfield; Paul Carpenter
- Cinematography: Walter J. Harvey; Len Harris
- Edited by: Maurice Rootes
- Music by: Ivor Slaney; Kenny Baker (trumpet solos)
- Production company: Hammer Film Productions
- Distributed by: Exclusive Films (UK); Lippert Pictures (US)
- Release date: 22 February 1954
- Running time: 84 minutes
- Country: United Kingdom
- Language: English

Face the Music (U.S. title: The Black Glove) is a 1954 British second feature ('B') crime drama film directed by Terence Fisher and starring Alex Nicol, Eleanor Summerfield and Paul Carpenter. It was written by Ernest Borneman based on his 1954 novel of the same title. J. Elder Wills was art director, Jimmy Sangster was assistant director and Phil Leakey did Makeup. Michael Carreras, who loved jazz music, was able to hire trumpeter Kenny Baker to coach Alex Nicol in how to play the trumpet. The film was released in the United States by Lippert Pictures. Filming ran from June 22nd to July 20th, 1953, and the film was trade shown at the Hammer Theatre on Feb. 2, 1954 and released on Feb. 22.

== Plot ==
Maxine Halbard, a London nightclub blues singer, is murdered. American trumpeter James Bradley, who was with her on the final night she was alive, is implicated in the crime, but innocent, and sets out to clear his name. In the course of his enquiries, he meets Maurice Green, who runs a recording studio. It turns out that Green is mentally unstable, and Bradley exposes him as the real murderer.

== Cast ==
- Alex Nicol as James Bradley
- Eleanor Summerfield as Barbara Quigley
- John Salew as Maxie Maguilies
- Paul Carpenter as Johnny Sutherland
- Geoffrey Keen as Maurie Green
- Ann Hanslip as Maxine Halbard
- Fred Johnson as Detective Sergeant MacKenzie
- Martin Boddey as Inspector Mulrooney
- Arthur Lane as Jeff Colt
- Paula Byrne as Gloria Lewis Colt
- Leo Phillips as dresser
- Freddie Tripp as stage manager
- Ben Williams as gatekeeper
- Frank Birch as trumpet salesman
- Jeremy Hawk as recording technician
- Melvyn Hayes as hotel bellhop

== Production ==
It was produced by Hammer Films and shot at Bray Studios outside London with sets designed by the art director J. Elder Wills.

== Critical reception ==
The Monthly Film Bulletin wrote: "Though this highly involved and improbable affair is given a contain gloss by slick camera work and competent direction, nothing could bring an essentially unconvincing story to life, The denizens of Archer Street and Soho are well portrayed, but Alex Nicol seems uneasy in the leading role. Some shots of the show at the Palladium are interesting, and the music, particularly Kenny Baker's trumpet playing, is very effective."

Kine Weekly wrote: "Who-dunnit generously interspersed with hot rhythm. Its tale of an American musician who solves a tricky murder mystery during his stay in London is a bit involved, but the types are convincing and the climax exciting. Moreover, the jam 'sessions' are long enough to please bobbysox fans, without irritating grown-ups. Showmanlike, comprehensive and abounding with exploitation angles, it's a sound proposition for the crowd."

Allmovie wrote: "Not one of Fisher's more rousing films."

In The Radio Times Guide to Films David Parkinson gave the film 2/5 stars, writing: "This adequate mystery offers a rare nice guy outing to soulless screen villain Alex Nicol, slumming in Britain after his Hollywood career went into a decline. Looking nothing like a trumpeter, he goes underground to prove his innocence when he is accused of murdering a singer. In one of his last assignments before becoming Hammer's horror maestro, director Terence Fisher never manages to intrigue."

In British Sound Films: The Studio Years 1928–1959 David Quinlan rated the film as "mediocre", writing: "Slow-paced whodunnit with phoney showbiz atmosphere. Star seems ill-at-ease."
