= Rudyerd Boulton =

American ornithologist

- Born: April 5, 1901; Beaver, Pennsylvania, US
- Died: January 24, 1983 (aged 81); Zimbabwe
- Other name: "Rud"
- Education: Amherst College; University of Pittsburgh
- Scientific career
- Fields: Ornithology
- Workplaces: American Museum of Natural History; Carnegie Museum of Natural History; Field Museum of Natural History

Wolfrid Rudyerd Boulton (April 5, 1901 – January 24, 1983) was an American ornithologist who worked extensively in Africa. Boulton held positions at the American Museum of Natural History and the Carnegie Museum of Natural History and traveled widely on expeditions to Africa. With his first wife, ethnomusicologist Laura Boulton, he made the first recordings of African tropical bird calls. Boulton was recruited into the Office of Strategic Services (OSS) during the Second World War because of his knowledge of Africa and his experience in foreign travel. He was responsible for monitoring the supply of uranium ore from the Belgian Congo for the Manhattan Project. Boulton transferred to the Central Intelligence Agency (CIA) in 1947 and resigned in 1958.

Boulton moved to Southern Rhodesia in 1959 with his third wife and established the Atlantica Foundation, a charitable organization to encourage the study of African birds. Atlantica's connection with the CIA was never established, although Boulton was interviewed by Rhodesia's Central Intelligence Organisation over his links to the organization. Atlantica lost much of its funding following Rhodesia's Unilateral Declaration of Independence in 1965 and Boulton closed the foundation in 1978. He died in Zimbabwe (Rhodesia).

== Early life and career ==
W. Rudyerd Boulton was born in Beaver, Pennsylvania, on April 5, 1901. His first name is given variously as Wolfrid and Wilfred but was generally not used, being known as "W. Rudyerd Boulton", "Rudyerd Boulton" or "Rud". He joined the American Ornithologists' Union at around the age of 15 – he would remain a member for the whole of his life. He attended Amherst College and then the University of Pittsburgh, from which he graduated with Bachelor of Science degree in 1924. Immediately after graduation Boulton was made research assistant at the American Museum of Natural History's ornithology department. He was a participant of Arthur Stannard Vernay's 1925 expedition to Angola and in the same year married the ethnomusicologist Laura Boulton (née Crayton).

Boulton transferred to the Carnegie Museum of Natural History in 1926 as assistant curator of birds and in 1929 joined the Sarah Lavanburg Straus expedition to Nyasaland (Malawi), Uganda and Kenya. In the course of this, with his wife, he made the first ever recordings of the calls of African tropical birds. Boulton was also a member of the 1929–30 Carnegie Museum African expedition and the 1930-31 Vernay-Lang Kalahari Expedition. In 1931 Boulton was appointed assistant curator at the Field Museum of Natural History and, the same year, accompanied Ralph Pulitzer on his expedition to Angola. During the expedition he discovered a previously unknown species of warbler that he named in honour of his wife. In 1933 he published a children's book entitled Travelling with the Birds. Boulton was a member of the 1934 Field Museum-Straus expedition that traveled 12,900 km from Dakar to Cameroon via Nigeria and later took part in expeditions to Panama, the West Indies and the Galapagos Islands. Boulton was promoted to curator of birds in 1937, a position he retained until 1946. He separated from his wife in 1938 and remarried four years later to Inez Cunningham Stark, an heiress, poet and patron of the arts. In 1948 he donated extensive film documentation of his research expeditions to the Field Museum.

== OSS/CIA career ==
Boulton was recruited into the Office of Strategic Services, which was then the US intelligence agency, in 1942 due to his knowledge of Africa and overseas experience. He was appointed divisional deputy for Africa in the Secret Intelligence Branch. Boulton was responsible, from 1943, for co-coordinating a joint program with the X-2 Counter Espionage Branch to monitor the supply of uranium ore, vital to the success of the Manhattan Project, which was primarily obtained from the Belgian Congo. Despite his experience, Boulton was based primarily in Washington, DC, only once leaving the country – to visit North Africa in 1944. During the war Adolph W. Schmidt, later to be the American ambassador to Canada, served as one of his intelligence officers.

By February 1946 Boulton had to resign from his position at the Carnegie so that he could focus on his work for the government, although he remained a research associate of the museum. He transferred to the Central Intelligence Agency when it was established as the successor to the OSS in 1947. An ornithological expedition Boulton undertook in North Africa in 1952 may have been funded by the CIA as cover for an operation, or if not, by his second wife. A further expedition to Southern Rhodesia and Angola in 1957 was funded by the Carnegie Museum. Boulton resigned from the CIA in April 1958, the same year his wife died.

== Rhodesia ==
Boulton married for the third and final time in April 1959 to Louise Rehm, the widow of a former OSS colleague. Within months the couple had moved to Southern Rhodesia where they founded the Atlantica Foundation, a charitable organization to encourage ornithologists, particularly students, to study the birds of Africa. Boulton had a farm near Lake McIlwaine which housed an extensive art collection that was exhibited at the Rhodes National Gallery in December 1960. He sold some of his art, including works by Pablo Picasso, Marc Chagall, Wassily Kandinsky and Paul Klee to fund the work of Atlantica. Boulton and his wife made frequent donations to the organization, contributing fully one third of their wealth to it. Although there were suspicions, it has never been documented that Atlantica received financial support from the CIA. The foundation funded scholarships at Nyatsime College and donated books to more than 100 educational establishments.

In addition to his work at the foundation Boulton was managing editor of Rhodesia Science News and president of the Rhodesia Scientific Association. He also assisted with early conservation projects in the region to the south-west of Lusaka, which was established as Lochinvar National Park in 1972, and experimented with farming termites as a nutritional foodstuff. Boulton carried out expeditions with a mobile laboratory to the Kalahari Desert in Tanzania. The laboratory included advanced listening equipment and map-making tools, which he may well have used to carry out surveys for the CIA. Rhodesia's Central Intelligence Organisation was suspicious of Boulton's CIA connections and advanced equipment and he was interviewed by them.

Boulton lost his international funding following Rhodesia's Unilateral Declaration of Independence in 1965 and the introduction of US sanctions in 1967. As a result, Atlantica was forced to heavily reduce its programs. It may well be that the Boultons would have left the increasingly isolated Rhodesia if Louise was able to, but she was struck by blindness and senility and required 24-hour care. Louise died in 1974 and two years later Boulton returned to the United States to manage the process of closing Atlantica. He transferred the remaining funds to the Conservation Trust of Rhodesia in 1978. The Atlantica properties were used to educate students from within the country and from Mozambique by the new black-majority government of Zimbabwe (which Rhodesia had been renamed).

Boulton had two strokes in later life and was a wheelchair user. He died on January 24, 1983, in Zimbabwe.

A species of African gecko, Rhoptropus boultoni, is named in honour of Rudyerd Boulton.

== See also ==
- Category:Taxa named by Rudyerd Boulton
