= After Prison, What? =

- Directed by: Ron Weyman
- Written by: Ron Weyman
- Produced by: Sydney Newman
- Narrated by: Lorne Greene
- Cinematography: Lorne C. Batchelor
- Edited by: Nicholas Balla; Margaret Coventry
- Production company: National Film Board of Canada
- Release date: 1951
- Running time: 11:29 minutes
- Country: Canada
- Languages: English; French

After Prison, What? (Après le bagne) is a 1951 Canadian dramatized short documentary film directed by Ron Weyman for the National Film Board of Canada as part of its Canada Carries On series.

== Plot ==
The film, narrated by Lorne Greene, centres on Charles Brown, a man who is struggling to adjust back to society after being released from Kingston Penitentiary. He can't find a job because he has a criminal record. He is beset by fear and doubt; he has learned a trade in prison but prospective employers view him with suspicion. Finally, the John Howard Society steps in, securing a job for him where he can take his place in society and regain his self-respect.

== Awards ==
The film won the Canadian Film Award for Best Theatrical Short Film at the 3rd Canadian Film Awards in 1951.
