= Morning on the Lièvre =

- Directed by: David Bairstow
- Written by: Archibald Lampman (original text)
- Produced by: David Bairstow; Guy Glover
- Narrated by: George Whalley
- Cinematography: Grant Crabtree
- Edited by: David Bairstow
- Music by: Eldon Rathburn
- Production company: National Film Board of Canada
- Release date: June 1961 (Berlin International Film Festival)
- Running time: 13 minutes
- Country: Canada
- Language: English

Morning on the Lièvre is a 1961 short film, directed by David Bairstow for the National Film Board of Canada.

The film depicts two men canoeing on the Lièvre River near Notre-Dame-de-la-Salette, Quebec. Five poems by the Canadian poet Archibald Lampman –Solitude, After Mist, Ambition, A Dawn on the Lièvre, and the 1888 classic Morning on the Lièvre, are narrated by broadcaster and poet George Whalley. The poems give a detailed description of the forest, providing a narrative timeline progressing from dawn to full day. Ambition closes the film by asserting Lampman's rejection of contemporary society and his choice to remain in nature.

The scene was inspired by Lampman's friendship with civil servant and poet Duncan Campbell Scott; Scott had introduced Lampman to camping and the appreciation of nature, while Lampman inspired Scott to begin writing poetry.

Due to poor weather and spoiled footage, Bairstow shot the film over two seasons, and in autumn, rather than in the spring, when Lampman actually took the trip that inspired the poem. He wanted the scenes to be linked by a recurring musical motif and commissioned original work from Eldon Rathburn. He took the advice of assistant director Stephen Greenlees, who had commented that the original footage was "monotonous", and added staged footage of the river's rapids. He also emphasized the colours of the leaves, which are a defining element of the landscape tradition of the Group of Seven; the images in the film specifically recall paintings by the Group, such as The Red Maple by A. Y. Jackson, J. E. H. MacDonald's Falls, Montreal River, and Tom Thomson's In the Northland.

The choice to adapt Morning on the Lièvre to film was a significant departure from the National Film Board of Canada's previous literary adaptations, but it was a familiar poem to students of the time and fit the board's mandate to make educational films that could be used in classrooms, and that were visually artistic and experimental.

== Awards ==
- Berlin International Film Festival, Berlin: Silver Bear, 1961
- Edinburgh International Film Festival, Edinburgh, Scotland: Diploma of Merit, 1961
- 14th Canadian Film Awards, Toronto: Best Theatrical Short, 1962
- Boston Film Festival, Boston: Award of the Jury "For excellence in successful creative exploration of the film medium", 1962
- Columbus International Film & Animation Festival, Columbus, Ohio - Chris Statuette, 1962
- Festival of Tourist and Folklore Films, Brussels: Prize of the General Commission of France, 1963
