= Hugo McPherson =

Canadian lecturer

Hugh Archibald McPherson (August 28, 1921 – 1999), better known as Hugo McPherson, was a Canadian professor, who served as Canada's Government Film Commissioner from 1967 until 1970. In this position he was the Chairman of the National Film Board of Canada.

McPherson was born in Sioux Lookout, Ontario in August 1921 to Peter Gordon McPherson and Nettie Louella McPherson (née Perrin). He was educated at the Provincial Normal School in Edmonton, Alberta, and later at the University of Manitoba, The University of Western Ontario and the University of Toronto.

McPherson was a lecturer at several academic institutions: McGill University, the University of Manitoba, the University of British Columbia, the University of Toronto, Yale University and the University of Western Ontario. He also worked in radio, hosting the programme CJBC Views the Shows on the Toronto-based Canadian Broadcasting Corporation station CJBC.

When he was working at the University of Toronto he had an office near Phyllis Grosskurth, who later remembered McPherson and recommended him to Secretary of State for Canada Judy LaMarsh when LaMarsh was selecting a new Government Film Commissioner in 1967. McPherson was an admirer of the media theory of Marshall McLuhan, whose work he praised during his interview for the National Film Board (NFB) role. McPherson was offered and accepted the role, although some staff at the NFB were suspicious of their new chairman, thinking that he had only been appointed due to political connections.

During his time at the NFB, McPherson initiated the "Challenge for Change" series of socially activist productions. However, it was also under his aegis that the NFB began to censor some controversial productions, particularly those from French Canadian filmmakers based in Quebec. Some of the French-speaking filmmakers did not trust McPherson, as they saw him as coming from a literary and not a filmic background.

McPherson resigned from his role at the NFB in July 1970. Earlier that year, the Canadian government had publicly criticised the NFB, and some employees had demonstrated on Parliament Hill to protest against staff cuts. McPherson's time at the NFB is generally seen as having been unsuccessful, although McPherson himself was frustrated at what he saw as the government's low priority for filmmaking.

In 1976 he was appointed to the position of John Grierson Chair of Communications at McGill University. He died at a hospital in Montreal in 1999.

== Footnotes ==
Cultural offices
| Preceded by Grant McLean (interim) | Government Film Commissioner and Chairperson of the National Film Board of Canada; 1967-1970 | Succeeded by Sydney Newman |
