= Farewell Oak Street =

- Directed by: Grant McLean
- Written by: Gordon Burwash
- Produced by: Gordon Burwash; Guy Glover (exec.)
- Narrated by: Lorne Greene
- Cinematography: Robert Humble
- Edited by: Fergus McDonell
- Music by: Eldon Rathburn
- Production company: National Film Board of Canada
- Release date: 1953
- Running time: 17 minutes
- Country: Canada
- Language: English

Farewell Oak Street is a 1953 Canadian docudrama short film, directed by Grant McLean for the National Film Board of Canada (NFB).

The film, which is part of the NFB's Canada Carries On series, is about the late-1940s demolition of the run-down Oak Street homes in Toronto's Cabbagetown neighbourhood, in favour of the new Regent Park housing development. The story is told through narration by Lorne Greene, the use of documentary footage, and a dramatization of the story of a family whose lives are transformed for the better by the project.

Farewell Oak Street was controversial with residents of the Oak Street/Regent Park area, several of whom filed complaints objecting to being characterized as slum dwellers, and alleged that the film vastly overstated the dangers of life in the old neighbourhood prior to the redevelopment. Charles Henry, the area's Member of Parliament, spoke against the film in the Canadian House of Commons, calling it offensive to the dignity of the residents and demanding that citizenship minister Walter Edward Harris restrict the film's distribution. Harris declined to restrict the film.

The film received renewed attention in the early 2010s when Regent Park was again redeveloped, as the continued social problems in the community were contrasted against the film's overly optimistic thesis that the original post-war redevelopment was certain to solve them.

== Cast ==
- Roxana Bond
- Bonnie Brooks
- Gerald Campbell
- Eric Clavering
- Ruth Davis
- Andy Halmay
- Cosette Lee
- Edgar Marshall
- Douglas Masters
- Jim McRae
- Kate Reid

== Awards ==
- 6th Canadian Film Awards, Montreal: Canadian Film Award for Best Theatrical Short, 1954
- Golden Reel Film Festival, Film Council of America, New York: Recognition of Merit, 1955
- International Congress of Housing and Town Planning, Vienna: First Prize, 1956
