= Louis Applebaum =

Canadian film score composer

Louis Applebaum CC OOnt FRCMT(hon)
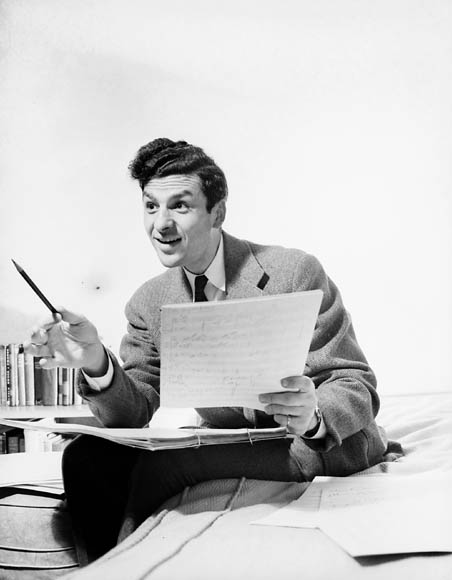
- Applebaum in December 1945
- Born: April 3, 1918; Toronto, Ontario, Canada
- Died: April 19, 2000 (aged 82); Toronto, Ontario, Canada
- Known for: Composer, administrator, conductor
- Awards: Order of Canada; Order of Ontario

Louis Applebaum CC OOnt FRCMT(hon) (April 3, 1918 – April 19, 2000) was a Canadian film score composer, administrator, and conductor.

== Early life ==
He was born in Toronto, Ontario, and studied at the Toronto Conservatory of Music with Leo Smith and the University of Toronto with Boris Berlin, Healey Willan and Ernest MacMillan. He also studied composition privately in New York.

== Film composition ==
Applebaum composed approximately 250 film scores for the National Film Board of Canada (NFB) between 1942 and 1960, serving as its music director from 1942 to 1948, then as a consultant from 1949 to 1953. His NFB credits include Royal Journey (1951), The Stratford Adventure (1954) and Paddle to the Sea (1966).

He was nominated, along with co-composer Ann Ronell, for an Academy Award for the score of the 1945 war film, The Story of G.I. Joe. He won a 1968 Canadian Film Award for his non-feature music score of Athabasca. He won a 1989 Gemini Award in the category Best Original Music Score for a Program or Mini-Series for Glory Enough for All.

== Other work ==
He was the first music director of the Stratford Festival and in 1955 established the Stratford Music Festival as an offshoot of the then two-year-old theatre festival. He resigned from his administrative duties at Stratford in 1960 though he continued until 1999 to provide incidental music for festival productions. He was composer, music director or sound designer for 70 productions over 46 years. His fanfares have been played prior to every performance at Stratford's main stage since 1953.

After resigning from Stratford in 1960, he served as president of Group Four Productions, a documentary and television production company, until 1966. He was a music consultant from 1960 to 1963 for CBC Television, chairman of the music, opera and ballet advisory committee for the National Arts Centre from 1963 to 1966, and wrote a 1965 government-commissioned report which led to the formation of the National Arts Centre Orchestra, as well as a plan for the establishment of a department of music at the University of Ottawa. He served as chairman of a Composers, Authors and Publishers Association of Canada (CAPAC)/Canadian Association of Broadcasters committee for the promotion of Canadian music from 1965 to 1970, and was in charge of member relations for CAPAC (1968–1971) and served on its board. He served on an advisory arts panel and was a jury member for the Canada Council from 1970 to 1971 and was a consultant for the St. Lawrence Centre for the Arts from 1968 to 70.

He was executive director of the Ontario Arts Council from 1971 to 1980. Working on behalf of the Government of Canada as chairman of the Federal Cultural Policy Review Committee, he co-authored with Jacques Hébert the influential Applebaum-Hébert Report, the first review of Canadian cultural institutions and federal cultural policy since 1951. He also served as vice-president of the Canadian League of Composers.

== Honours ==
In 1976 he was made an Officer of the Order of Canada. Applebaum was appointed to the Order of Ontario in 1989. He was appointed to the Companion of the Order of Canada 15 November 1995.

In 1997, Applebaum was awarded the inaugural Special Achievement Award at the SOCAN Awards in Toronto.

In 1998, the Ontario Arts Foundation established the Louis Applebaum Composers Award. Originally created to honour excellence in music composition for theatre, music theatre, dance or opera, as of 2014 it is presented to recognize "excellence in a body of work by an artist in the field of music composition for film and television."
