= Grant Crabtree =

Canadian cinematographer and film director

Grant H. Crabtree
- Born: Grant Holland Crabtree; June 10, 1913; Ottawa, Ontario, Canada
- Died: October 14, 2008 (aged 95); Sydney, Nova Scotia, Canada
- Occupations: Cinematographer, director, photographer

Grant Holland Crabtree (June 10, 1913 – October 14, 2008) was a Canadian cinematographer, director, and photographer who worked during the early years of the Canadian film industry, first for Crawley Films, then for the National Film Board and the National Research Council. His work includes the highly touted The Loon's Necklace, The Chairmaker and the Boys, Morning on the Lièvre, and Song of Seasons.

== Early life ==
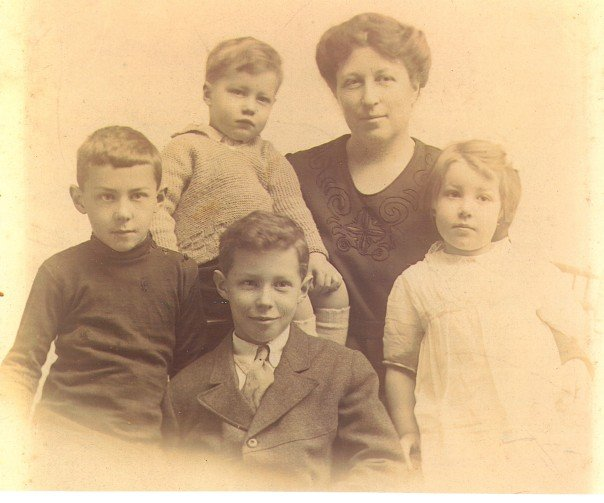
Crabtree Family circa 1920.

Crabtree was born in Ottawa, Ontario, Canada, the son of Charles Archie Crabtree and Elvina Kennedy Greenham. Raised in the family home on 95 Mackinnon Road in Rockliffe Park with siblings John, Betty, and Graham, Crabtree was born into a family of artists. His father, an art department head at William Notman’s photographic studio in Montreal and later owner and operator of Crabtree Gravure Limited, an engraving business; his mother, an artist and cartoonist, was a student of painter John Singer Sargent, and graduated from the Royal Academy in 1903.

Crabtree attended Rockliffe Park School, followed by Lisgar Collegiate, where he was a member of the school's hockey team. In addition to playing for the Lisgar team, Crabtree was a member of the New Edinburgh Intermediate City Hockey League and the New Edinburgh Canoe Club. Following high school and during the Great Depression, Crabtree helped his father in his business, working with plates and developing prints, and learning how to produce quality images.

Crabtree's interest in photography began in 1928, when he obtained his first postcard print-size Kodak Camera. He soon joined a local camera club, where his annual contest submission, a portrait of his brother Graham, won first prize. Inspired by Edward Steichen’s Vanity Fair portraits, and encouraged by positive reaction to his work, Crabtree began his long career in photography, film and much more to be listed here.

== Career ==
Crabtree's foray into the film business came in 1939 when he met John Grierson, founder and head of the National Film Board of Canada, and received an offer from filmmaker Budge Crawley to shoot Bacon For Britain, a work highlighting the contributions of the country's agriculturalists to the war effort. Crabtree continued work for Crawley Films until 1950, and remained a freelancer with the NFB until the late 1970s. In 1969, Crabtree joined the National Research Council of Canada, producing images and films of scientific endeavors. Over the course of his career, Crabtree was involved in the making of more than 70 films, many of which were award-winning.

== Personal life ==
Crabtree married Marjorie Dean Morse (September 9, 1921 – March 19, 2000) of Toronto in July 1950. The couple had two daughters, Lauren and Carla. In 1973, Crabtree purchased a farmhouse in East Margaree, Cape Breton Island, where he spent most of his time in the remainder of his life. An avid outdoorsman, Crabtree was an award-winning rower and downhill skier. In retirement, he continued his artistic pursuits, taking keen interest in nature and landscape photography and woodworking, producing furniture and crafts. He also produced his own maple syrup and assortment of jams, marmalade, and jellies. Crabtree was widowed following his wife's death in 2000. He continued to live in Cape Breton with his family until his death on October 14, 2008, after a four-month battle with illness. His two daughters, eight grandchildren, and four great-grandchildren survive him.

== Selected filmography ==
=== The Loon’s Necklace (1950) ===
A film about the Tsimshian legend of the blind Chief Kelora and the loon that magically restores his eyesight, The Loon's Necklace is a classic in Canadian film history. Produced by Crawley Films, directed by Budge Crawley, filmed by Crabtree, and with art by Graham Crabtree, The Loon's Necklace runs 11 minutes 6 seconds and earned the honour of Film of the Year at the Canadian Film Awards in 1949.

=== The Chairmaker and the Boys (1959) ===
A safety film chronicling the dangers of play around a water mill, The Chairmaker and the Boys is the story of Ernest Hart, carpenter and blacksmith of the Margaree Valley, and his two troublesome grandsons. Written and shot by Crabtree and produced by Tim Wilson, the film runs just over 20 minutes and won numerous awards, including the Certificate of Merit in the Films for Children category at the Genie Awards in 1960 and the Diploma of Honour at the International Meeting of Films for Youth in Cannes in 1962.

=== Morning on the Lievre (1961) ===
Depicting Archibald Lampman’s popular poem describing Quebec's Lievre River in late September, Morning on the Lievre is a testament to the beauty of the Canadian Shield wilderness. Directed by David Bairstow and shot by Crabtree, Morning on the Lievre runs 13 minutes and earned several awards, including the Diploma of Merit at the International Film Festival in Boston in 1962, and the Award of Merit in the "Theatrical Short" category at the Genie Awards in 1962.

=== Song of Seasons (1977) ===
An exploration of the changing seasons and changes in the way of life on Cape Breton Island, Song of Seasons was filmed and written by Crabtree. Commissioned by DEVCO, a narrative of the film centres around the importation of sheep from Scotland to Cape Breton as part of a community economic development initiative undertaken by the corporation.

== Awards ==
Bronze Medal, International Festival of Didactic Films, Beirut Lebanon, 1979, for He Acts His Age (1949), produced by Crawley Films. Director Judith Crawley; Photographer Grant Crabtree.

Film of the Year, Canadian Film Awards, 1949; Institute of Design, Illinois Institute of Technology Award for Standard of Excellence in Audio-Visual Communication, 1952, for The Loon's Necklace (1950), produced by Crawley Films. Director Budge Crawley; Photography Grant Crabtree.

Honourable Mention, Non-theatrical Government Sponsored Films, Genie Awards, Montreal, 1953, for Western Wheat (1951), produced by the NFB. Director Larry Gosnell; Photography Grant Crabtree.

Blue Ribbon Award, Graphic Arts, Itinerant-American Film and Video Festival, New York City, 1963; First Prize, International Festival of Films for Children, Mar de Plata, 1960; First Award, Non-theatrical Government Sponsored Films, Genie Awards, Montreal, for The World at Your Feet (1953), produced by the NFB. Director Larry Gosnell; Photography Grant Crabtree.

First Prize, Children's Films, International Film Festival, Kelowna, 1958; Honourable Mention: Golden Sheaf Awards, Short Film and Video Festival, Yorkton, 1954, for Ti-Jean Goes Lumbering (1953), produced by the NFB. Director Jean Palardy; Photography Grant Crabtree.

First Prize, Science Category, International Film Festival, Kelowna, 1958, for The Salmon's Struggle for Survival (1957), produced by the NFB. Director Walford Hewitson; Photography Grant Crabtree.

Honourable Mention: Recreation Films, International Children’s Film Festival, La Plata, Argentina, 1967; Diploma of Honour, International Meeting of Films for Youth, Cannes, France, 1962; Silver Plaque Second Prize, Films for Children, Electronic, Nuclear and Teleradio Cinematographic Review, Rome, Italy, 1962; Certificate of Merit, Films for Children, Genie Awards, Toronto, 1960; Diploma, Film Festival, Vienna, Austria, 1960; Certificate of Merit, Canadian Film Awards, 1960, for The Chairmaker and the Boys (1959), produced by the NFB. Script and Photography by Grant Crabtree.

Prize of the General Commission of France, Festival of Tourist and Folklore Films, Brussels, Belgium, 1963; Chris Statuette Award, International Film and Video Festival, 1962; Award of Merit; Award of the Jury, Theatrical Short, Genie Awards, Toronto, 1962; Diploma of Merit, International Film Festival, Boston, 1962; Silver Bear, International Film Festival, Edinburgh, 1961; Participant, International Film Festival, Berlin, for Morning on the Lievre (1961), produced for the NFB. Director David Bairstow; Photography Grant Crabtree.

Silver, International Agrarfilm Awards, Berlin, 1972, for Seaweeds, produced for the National Research Council.

== Filmography ==
=== As director ===
- Painters of Quebec (1944)
- Klee Wyck (1946)
- From Tee To Green (1950)
- Eye Witness No. 69 (1955)
- Eye Witness No. 71 (1955)
- Eye Witness No. 75 (1955)
- Eye Witness No. 77 (1955)
- Eye Witness No. 79 (1955)
- Eye Witness No. 85 (1956)
- Eye Witness No. 88 (1955)
- Eye Witness No. 90 (1957)
- Eye Witness No. 92 (1957)
- Eye Witness No. 94 (1957)
- Eye Witness No. 95 (1957)
- Eye Witness No. 101 (1958)
- Songs of Nova Scotia (1958)
- Pick a Ham (1959)
- Let's Look at Weeds (1959)
- Bacon (1959)
- The Stowaway (1960)
- The Saddlemaker (1961)
- Auroral Rocket (1964)
- To The Edge of the Universe (1969)
- To The Edge of the Universe (1974)
- Song of Seasons (1977)
- Discover Your Own Special Place (1987)

=== As cinematographer ===
- Bacon For Britain (1939)
- Who Sheds His Blood (1941)
- La Cite de Notre-Dame (1942)
- The Face of Time (1942)
- Ukrainian Winter Holidays (1942)
- Ukrainian Dance (1943)
- Wartime Housing (1943)
- Ski in the Valley of the Saints (1944)
- Montreal (1944)
- Four Seasons (1944)
- Trappers of the Sea (1945)
- Holiday at School (1946)
- Mother and Her Child (1947)
- The Mother of Rivers (1947)
- Ticket to Jasper (1947)
- He Acts His Age (1949)
- Come to the Fair (1949)
- The Loon's Necklace (1950)
- Milk-Made (1951)
- Western Wheat (1952)
- The World at Your Feet (1953)
- Ti-Jean Goes Lumbering (1953)
- Les Deux Pieds Sur Terre (1953)
- Eye Witness No. 52 (1953)
- Pole Barns and Milking Parlours (1953)
- Man Against a Fungus (1955)
- Farm Calendar (1955)
- Harvest in the Valley (1955)
- Eye Witness No. 72 (1955)
- Eye Witness No. 73 (1955)
- Eye Witness No. 74 (1955)
- Eye Witness No. 76 (1955)
- Chemical Conquest (1956)
- La Recolte des Pommes de Terre (1956)
- Camera on Labour No. 3 (1956)
- The Salmon's Struggle for Survival (1957)
- Eye Witness No. 86: Bar Mitzvah (1957)
- Eye Witness No. 89 (1957)
- L’Annee a la Ferme (1957)
- Women at Work (1958)
- Wheat Rust (1958)
- Rabies in Your Community (1958)
- The Decision (1958)
- The Changing Forest (1958)
- Teamwork in Farm Research (1959)
- How Do You Drive? (1959)
- The Chairmaker and the Boys (1959)
- 5BX Plan For Physical Fitness (1959)
- A Lake for the Prairie (1961)
- Crossbreeding for Profit (1961)
- Morning on the Lievre (1961)
- Science for the Farmer (1964)
- A Tree is a Living Thing (1964)
- About Flowers (1964)
- Seaweeds (1972)
- A Research Brief #1 (1974)
- A Research Brief #2 (1976)
- Moses Coady (1976)
- Song of Seasons (1977)
- Celtic Spirits (1978)
