= Grant McLean (filmmaker) =

Canadian filmmaker

- Born: April 7, 1921; Yorkton, Saskatchewan
- Died: December 19, 2002 (aged 81); Toronto
- Education: University of Toronto
- Occupations: Cinematographer, Producer, Director
- Years active: 1942 – c 1980
- Awards: Member of the Order of Canada

Grant McLean, CM (April 7, 1921 – December 19, 2002) was a Canadian filmmaker, working as a cinematographer, film director and producer for the National Film Board of Canada (NFB), and serving as its Acting Commissioner through 1966 and 1967.

== Early life ==
Charles Grant McLean was born in Yorkton, Saskatchewan. His father, Allan Grant McLean, was head of the Canadian Grain Commission and chairman of the Liberal Party of Canada. His uncle, Ross McLean, was Commissioner of the NFB from 1945 to 1950. McLean studied at the University of Toronto and joined the NFB in 1941 as a cameraman.

== Career ==
One of the notable productions he worked on during World War II was the documentary Target - Berlin for the Canada Carries On series, which showed the building of the first Lancaster bomber to be made in Canada, with McLean later flying in the plane to capture footage of a bombing raid over Berlin in Germany. He became a film director in 1947, with his first production in this capacity being The People Between, a documentary about the Chinese Civil War. For this film he became the first Western cameraman to film Mao Zedong. He later claimed that he had not liked Mao, although he had been friendly with Zhou Enlai, whose support had been vital in enabling him to travel freely across China in the making of the film. However, The People Between was banned by the Canadian government, under pressure from the Government of the United States, due to its balanced portrayal of Communism. Some of the footage was used in the NFB documentary China in Need, and the film itself received a limited release in Europe.

McLean continued to direct films for the NFB into the 1950s, and two of his documentaries won Canadian Film Awards; 1953's Farewell Oak Street and 1955's High Tide in Newfoundland. He then became a producer, working on the Perspective series of documentaries.

In 1957 he was appointed as Assistant Film Commissioner and Director of Production; he remained in the latter role for 11 years. In this capacity he was responsible, in the early 1960s, for the NFB creating its first regional offices across Canada. In 1961 took the decision to assign four controversial French Canadian filmmakers who had previously been dismissed from Board by Fernand Dansereau, the executive producer of French language productions, to work together in the NFB's Studio G unit. These filmmakers were Claude Fournier, Michel Brault, Gilles Carle and Gilles Groulx.

In March 1966, the Government Film Commissioner and Chairman of the NFB Guy Roberge resigned from his position. Judy LaMarsh, the Secretary of State, appointed McLean as his acting replacement. When LaMarsh sought the advice of NFB founder John Grierson as to who should succeed Roberge on a full-time basis, he suggested that either McLean or Sydney Newman were the only viable replacements. However, Marsh instead chose to give the job to Hugo McPherson, who was appointed in May 1967.

During McLean's brief time in charge of the NFB, the Board's most noted achievement was the production of the innovative multi-screen film In the Labyrinth for the Expo 67 exhibition in Montreal. Soon after McPherson's arrival as head of the NFB, however, the new Commissioner announced plans to restructure senior levels of the organisation and replace his two assistants; McLean, one of these two assistants, resigned from the NFB.

After leaving the NFB in 1967, McLean and his NFB colleague Donald Wilder established McLean-Wilder Associates, a distribution company; this was later renamed the Visual Education Centre.

In 2002 he was appointed a Member of the Order of Canada; he died in Toronto later that year. He was survived by his second wife, Betty, and daughter Lenore, from his first marriage to Frances Keith McLean.

== Filmography ==
- Voice of Action - documentary short, James Beveridge 1942 - cinematographer
- Eskimo Arts and Crafts - documentary short, Laura Boulton 1943 - cinematographer
- Eskimo Summer - documentary short, Laura Boulton 1943 - cinematographer
- Arctic Hunters - documentary short, Laura Boulton 1944 - cinematographer
- Target - Berlin - documentary short, Ernest Borneman 1944 - co-cinematographer with Samuel Orleans and Donald Fraser
- Use Your Head: The Tump-Line Principle of Carrying Loads - documentary short, Robert Anderson 1944 - cinematographer
- Atlantic Crossroads - documentary short, Canada Carries On series, Tom Daly 1945 - co-producer with Tom Daly
- China's Need - documentary short, Fred Lasse 1947 - cinematographer
- The People Between - documentary short 1947 - cinematographer, director, co-writer with Tom Daly
- Who Will Teach Your Child? - documentary short, Stanley Jackson 1948 - cinematographer
- Arctic Jungle - documentary short, Sydney Newman 1948 - co-cinematographer with Laura Bolton
- Family Circles - documentary short, Morten Parker 1949 - cinematographer
- The Fight: Science Against Cancer - documentary short, Morten Parker 1950 - cinematographer
- Challenge: Science Against Cancer - documentary short, Morten Parker 1950 - cinematographer
- Canadian Talent Showcase: Sing With the Commodores - documentary short, Roger Blais and Douglas Tunstell 1951 - cinematographer
- Canadian Talent Showcase: Songs by Gisele with Gisele MacKenzie - documentary short, Sydney Newman 1951 - co-cinematographer with Lorne C. Batchelor
- Meet Gisele - documentary short, Sydney Newman 1951 - cinematographer
- The Outlaw Within documentary short, Morten Parker 1951 - cinematographer
- Tropical Lament - documentary short, Roger Blais 1951 - cinematographer
- Royal Journey - documentary, David Bairstow, Gudrun Parker, Roger Blais 1951 - co-cinematographer with Osmond Borradaile
- Eye Witness No. 23 - documentary short 1950 - cinematographer
- Eye Witness No. 34 - documentary short 1951 - cinematographer
- Eye Witness No. 42: 27th Canadian Infantry Brigade at Hanover - documentary short, 1952 - cinematographer
- Farewell Oak Street - documentary short, Canada Carries On series, 1953 - director
- The Ballot-o-Maniac - short film, Stanley Jackson 1953 - co-cinematographer with Osmond Borradaile
- Eye Witness No. 43 - documentary short 1952 - cinematographer
- Eye Witness No. 46 - documentary short 1953 - cinematographer
- Eye Witness No. 47 - documentary short - cinematographer
- Eye Witness No. 48 - documentary short - cinematographer
- Eye Witness No. 53: Immigrants from Holland - documentary short, 1953 - cinematographer, director
- Eye Witness No. 56 - documentary short 1953 - cinematographer, director
- Eye Witness No. 57 - documentary short 1953 - cinematographer, director
- Eye Witness No. 58 - documentary short 1953 - cinematographer, director
- Workshop for Science - documentary short 1954 - cinematographer, co-director and co-producer with Gordon Burwash
- Dresden Story - documentary short, Julian Biggs 1954 - co-editor with Gordon Burwash, co-producer with Gordon Burwash and Julian Biggs
- Diggers of the Deeps - documentary short, Canada Carries On series, 1954 - writer, director co-producer with Nicholas Balla
- Return of the Indian - documentary short, Canada Carries On series, 1955 - writer, cinematographer, director
- The Bird Fancier - documentary short, Bernard Devlin and Jean Palardy 1955 - cinematographer
- High Tide in Newfoundland - documentary short, Canada Carries On series, 1955 - writer, director
- Routine Flight - documentary short 1955 - cinematographer, co-director and co-producer with Gordon Burwash
- Vertical Flight - documentary short 1955 - writer, producer, director
- Christmas Comes Twice - documentary short 1955 - cinematographer, co-producer with Gordon Burwash
- No Longer Vanishing - documentary short 1955 - writer, cinematographer, director
- Raw Material - short film, Perspective series, Julian Biggs 1955 - producer
- Carnival - documentary short, Perspective series, Julian Biggs 1955 producer
- Coal at the Crossroads - documentary short, Perspective series, Jean Lenauer and Don Haldane 1955 - producer
- In this Dark World - documentary short, Perspective series, Jean Lenauer 1955 - producer
- New Hearts for Old - documentary short, Perspective series, Jean Lenauer 1955 - producer
- Prairie Profile - documentary short, Perspective series, Gordon Burwash 1955 - producer
- Invasion from the South - documentary short, Perspective series, John Howe 1956 - producer, executive producer
- Is It a Woman's World? - short film, Perspective series, Don Haldane 1956 - producer
- Monkey on the Back - short film, Perspective series, Julian Biggs 1956 - producer
- Are People Sheep? - documentary short, Perspective series, Julian Biggs 1956 - producer
- Railroad Town - documentary short, Perspective series, Don Haldane 1956 - producer
- Saskatchewan Traveller - short film, Perspective series, Don Haldane 1956 - producer
- Ship in Harbour - documentary short, Perspective series, Don Haldane 1956 - producer
- Woman Alone - documentary short, Perspective series, Julian Biggs 1956 - producer
- Elder Citizen - documentary short, Perspective series, Don Haldane 1956 - producer
- The Deserter - documentary short, Perspective series, Julian Biggs 1956 - producer
- Curtain at Noon - documentary short, Perspective series, Don Haldane 1956 - producer
- Case of Conscience - short film, Perspective series, Don Haldane 1956 - producer
- Night Shift - documentary short, Perspective series, Don Haldane 1956 - producer
- North of 60 - documentary short, Perspective series, John Howe 1956 - producer, executive producer
- Our Northern Citizen - documentary short, Perspective series, John Howe 1956 - producer, executive producer
- Submarine Hunt - documentary short, Perspective series, Jean Lenauer 1956 - producer
- The Tenth Frontier - documentary short, Perspective series, Thomas Farley 1956 - producer
- Win, Place or Show - documentary short, Perspective series, Don Haldane 1956 - producer
- Borderline - documentary short, Perspective series, Fergus McDonell 1957 - producer
- Royal Occasion - documentary short, 1957 - director
- Royal River - documentary short, Gordon Sparling and Roger Blais 1959 - producer
- The Atom: Servant of Man - documentary short, Canada Carries On series, Edmund Reid 1959 - co-producer with Nicholas Balla
- La guerre nucléaire, biologique et chimique - documentary short 1960 - documentary
- Help for the Homeless - documentary short, 1962 - director
- Aero 1B Operational Test Kit: Model 7042 - training film 1963 - director
- Redevelopment in Four Cities - compilation 1965 - executive producer

== Footnotes ==
Cultural offices
Preceded by Guy Roberge	Government Film Commissioner and Chairperson of the National Film Board of Canada; 1966-1967 (interim)	Succeeded by Hugo McPherson
