= Ernest Borneman =

German writer (1915–1995)

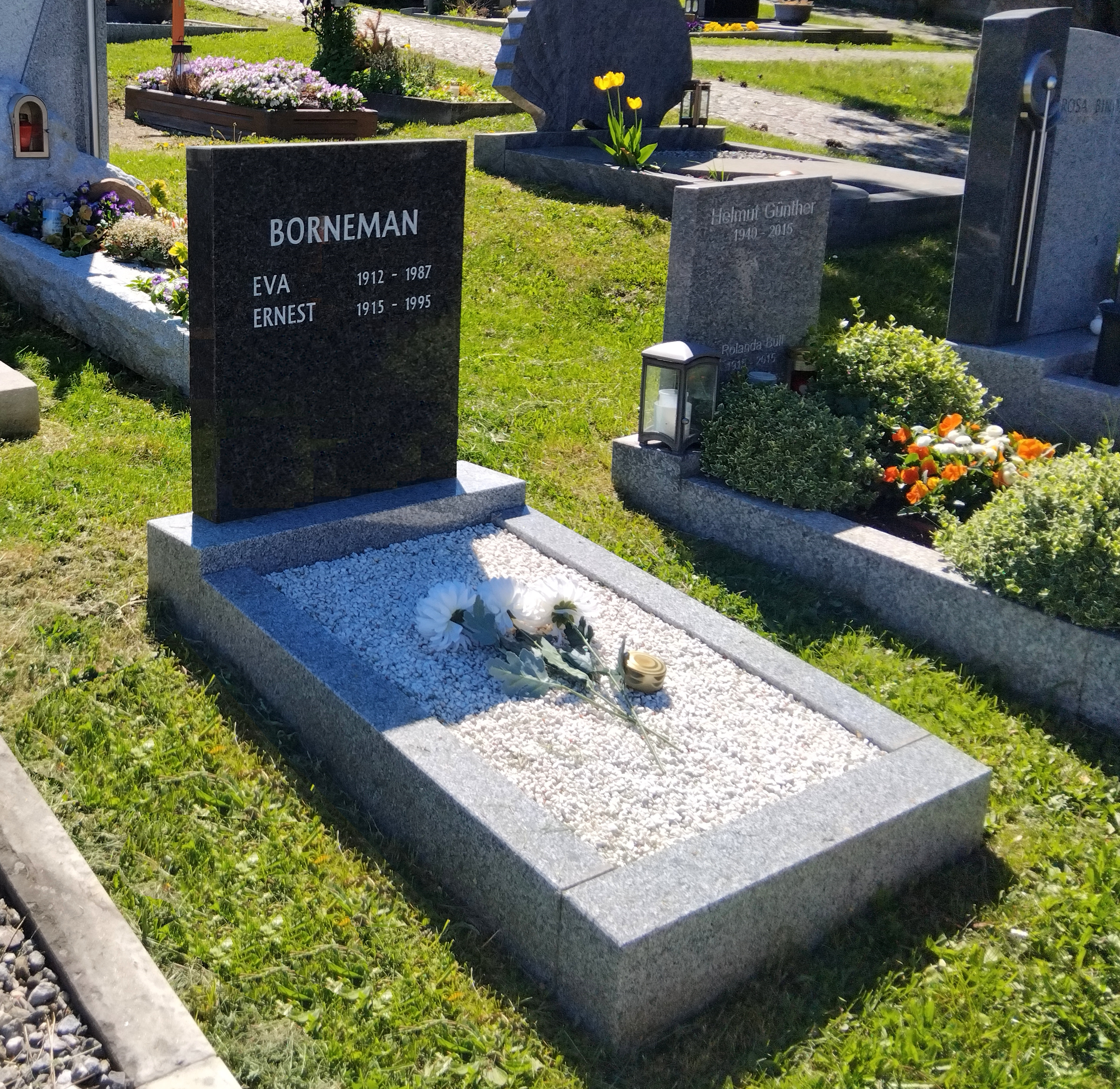
Scharten, grave of Ernest and Eva Borneman

Ernst Wilhelm Julius Bornemann (12 April 1915 – 4 June 1995), also known by his self-chosen anglicisation Ernest Borneman, was a German crime writer, filmmaker, anthropologist, ethnomusicologist, psychoanalyst, sexologist, communist agitator, jazz musician and critic.

In 1988, Ernest Bornemann argued that pedophilic acts involving neither physical nor psychological violence did not necessarily have negative consequences for the child.

== Works ==
=== Novels ===
- The Face on the Cutting-Room Floor (1937) (as Cameron McCabe); London : Picador Classic, 2016 (with an introduction by Jonathan Coe), ISBN 978-1-5098-2981-1
- Tremolo (1938)
- Face the Music (1954)
- Tomorrow Is Now (1959)
- The Compromisers (1961)
- The Man Who Loved Women (aka Landscape with Nudes) (1968)

=== Screenplays ===
- Face the Music (1954), a.k.a. The Black Glove in the U.S.
- Bang, You're Dead (1954), co-written with Guy Elmes, a.k.a. Game of Danger

=== Jazz writings ===
- "Swing Music. An Encyclopaedia of Jazz" (unpublished typescript, 580pp., 1940)
- A Critic Looks at Jazz (1946; collected criticism from his column in the jazz periodical The Record Changer, "An Anthropologist Looks at Jazz"; the only jazz book ever published by Borneman)
- "The Roots of Jazz", in Nat Hentoff and Albert J. McCarthy, eds., Jazz (New York: Rinehart, 1959)

=== Non-fiction ===
- Lexikon der Liebe und Erotik (1968)
- Psychoanalyse des Geldes. Eine kritische Untersuchung psychoanalytischer Geldtheorien (1973)
- Studien zu Befreiung des Kindes, 3 vols. (1973)
- Der obszöne Wortschatz der Deutschen—Sex im Volksmund (1974)
- Das Patriarchat. Ursprung und Zukunft unseres Gesellschaftssystems (1975)
- Die Ur-Szene. Eine Selbstanalyse (autobiographical, 1977)
- Reifungsphasen der Kindheit. Sexuelle Entwicklungspsychologie (1981)
- Die Welt der Erwachsenen in den verbotenen Reimen deutschsprachiger Stadtkinder (1982)
- Rot-weiß-rote Herzen. Das Liebes-, Ehe- und Geschlechtsleben der Alpenrepublik (1984)
- Das Geschlechtsleben des Kindes. Beiträge zur Kinderanalyse und Sexualpädologie (1985)
- Die neue Eifersucht. Starke Männer zeigen Schwäche: Sie werden eifersüchtig (1986)
- Ullstein Enzyklopädie der Sexualität (1990)
- Sexuelle Marktwirtschaft. Vom Waren- und Geschlechtsverkehr in der bürgerlichen Gesellschaft (1992)
- Die Zukunft der Liebe (2001) (his last book)

Borneman was also a scriptwriter for the British TV series The Adventures of Aggie (1956) about the adventures of a fashion designer on international assignments. Borneman directed the 20 minute Canadian documentary Northland (1942) and also the 15 minute documentary written by Leslie McFarlane, Target - Berlin (Objectif Berlin) (1944).
