= RMS Empress of Scotland =

Empress of Scotland may refer to one of these Canadian Pacific Steamships ocean liners:

- RMS Empress of Scotland (1906), 24,581-gross ton ship capable of 18 knots; scrapped in 1930
- RMS Empress of Scotland (1930), 30,030-gross ton ship capable of 22 knots; scrapped 1966
