= Jarko Zavi =

Canadian artist (1907–1987)

Jarko Zavi (1907–1987) was a Czech-born Canadian ceramist and sculptor who lived and worked principally in Ontario. After attending art college in Czechoslovakia, he worked producing fine china at the Terra Company for twelve years, rising to head of ceramics design. Zavi fled to Canada just five days before the outbreak of World War II. Soon after emigrating, he married Nunzia D'Angelo (1900–1968), a maker of majolica and folk pottery, and they had two daughters together. First located on Gerrard Street in Toronto, the couple renamed their kitchen factory the Ceramic Art Studio. During the war years they produced a large array of ornamental pieces, sought after by buyers. Their output included ceramic fish, prancing horses, vases, candle holders, bowls, teapots and earrings. Zavi diligently experimented with glazes, and he was able to produce colours that included Chinese red. In 1945, he sculpted a bust of Tomáš Masaryk, the first president of Czechoslovakia, which was unveiled at a public ceremony with the mayor of Toronto present.

Zavi and D'Angelo relocated in 1946 to a rural setting outside Cobourg, where Zavi wanted to establish a ceramic arts centre. In the same year, he was the subject of two features by the National Film Board. His wife gave up studio work, although she appeared in public as a demonstrator and teacher for a few years at the Canadian National Exposition. In 1959, they moved to Brighton. Zavi maintained his studio practice as a lone artist, isolated from the craft community and museums and galleries. He built his ceramic structures with his hands, without wire or papier-mâché molds. For his base material he used farm tile clay found in deposits near Arnprior. Zavi's works were not universally praised; one reviewer of an Ottawa exhibit found the pieces on display to be rather commercial and unexceptional, despite their beautiful execution. Somewhat unusually for a Canadian artist, he made his living entirely by his chosen art form. In 2014, some 40 to 50 of his pieces were displayed in a solo exhibition at a gallery in Brighton.
