= Laura Boulton =

American ethnomusicologist

- Laura Boulton c.1942
- Born: January 4, 1899; Conneaut, Ohio
- Died: October 16, 1980 (aged 81); Scottsdale, Arizona
- Other names: Laura Theresa Craytor; Laura Craytor Boulton
- Education: Denison University
- Occupations: Researcher; Filmmaker
- Known for: Ornithology; Filmmaking
- Spouse(s): Wolfrid Rudyerd Boulton, Jr. (1925–1941)

Laura Boulton née Craytor (January 4, 1899 – October 16, 1980) was an American ethnomusicologist. She is known for the many field recordings, films and photographs of traditional music and its performances and practitioners from Egypt, the Sudan, Uganda, Kenya and Tanganyika. Boulton also collected traditional musical instruments around the world. In her work with the National Film Board of Canada (NFB) during the Second World War, she is recognized as being a pioneer for women who work in the film industry.

== Early life ==
Laura Theresa Craytor was born in Conneaut, Ohio on January 4, 1899. She studied voice at Western Reserve University and obtained a B.A. degree from Denison University. In 1925, she married Wolfrid Rudyerd Boulton, Jr., who was an ornithologist and lecturer at the Carnegie Museums of Pittsburgh in Pittsburgh, Pennsylvania, on the ornithological staff of which she served in the early 1920s.

== Expeditions ==
In 1929 Boulton began graduate studies at the University of Chicago's anthropology department. In January 1929, Boulton began the first of a series of research expeditions which she was to accompany or lead over the next 50 years, and brought with her a cylinder recorder in order to record folk music as well as bird calls. This trip to Africa under the auspices of the American Museum of Natural History, which lasted approximately three months, allowed Boulton to collect musical instruments and recordings from the indigenous populations of Egypt, The Sudan, Uganda, Kenya and Tanganyika.

Over the next 50 years, Boulton participated in dozens of international expeditions, compiling extensive collections of field recordings, films, photographs, and musical instruments. Her autobiography, titled The Music Hunter documents these travels, but offers little additional information. As stated in The Music Hunter, Boulton's mission was, "To capture, absorb, and bring back the world's music; not the music of the concert hall or the opera house, but the music of the people ..."

Boulton visited and collected musical data and instruments from (in addition to the aforementioned localities) Mozambique, Nyasaland, Rhodesia, Transvaal, Cape Province, Sierra Leone, Liberia, Angola, Nigeria, Senegal, the Colony of Niger, Dahomey and other parts of French Equatorial Africa, the British Cameroons, the Belgian Congo, Ethiopia and Ghana.

Boulton was to publish many articles and films, and helped to produce a multitude of museum exhibits related to the artifacts and data she gathered during her research. She also presented a large number of illustrated educational lectures for students of music and anthropology at the University of Chicago's anthropology department.

== Filmmaking ==
In 1941, John Grierson, the head of the National Film Board of Canada contracted Boulton as a "freelancer" to make a series of films on Canadian cultural communities. Fellow women filmmakers also at the NFB like Judith Crawley was also hired on the same basis, while Evelyn Spice Cherry, Jane Smart and Gudrun Bjerring Parker were hired as permanent employees.

Although Boulton was originally only contracted for six weeks to make one film, her work at the NFB turned into a series called Peoples of Canada, consisting of 15 films. The goal of the wartime series was as a morale booster, that would "... broaden awareness of Canada's cultural mosaic, in order to create a feeling of national unity." Although Boulton had little film experience, she collaborated with a number of experienced cinematographers, including Judith Crawley. (Note: Although Boulton did not have a filmmaking background, Grierson was intrigued with her interest in aboriginal cultures.)

Robert Flaherty, the American filmmaker, and director of Nanook of the North (1922), served as a consultant on Boulton's three Baffin Island films. Postwar, Boulton's films would meet with great acclaim in Canada, the United States and Europe, contributing significantly to the growth of the NFB's international reputation.

== Filmography ==
- Ukrainian Winter Holidays (Un Noël ukrainien) - documentary short, 1942 - musical director, director
- Eskimo Arts and Crafts (L'artisanat esquimau) - documentary short, 1943 - producer, director
- New Scotland - documentary short, 1943 - producer, director
- Ukrainian Dance (Danse ukrainienne) - documentary short, 1943 - producer, director
- Arctic Hunters (La chasse aux phoques) - documentary short, 1944 - producer, director
- Eskimo Summer (L'été chez les Esquimaux) - documentary short, 1944 - producer, director
- Habitant Arts and Crafts - documentary short, 1944 - producer, director
- Land of Quebec (Le Pays de Québec) - documentary short, 1944 - producer, director
- People of the Potlatch (Les Indiens de la côte ouest) - documentary short, 1944 - producer, director
- Poland on the Prairies - documentary short, 1944 - producer, director
- Polish Dance - documentary short, 1944 - producer, director
- Totems - documentary short, 1944 - producer, director
- Arctic Jungle (Carnet de voyage)- documentary short, Sydney Newman 1948 - co-cinematographer with Grant McLean
- Across Wartime Canada (silent lecture film)
- Canadians All (silent Lecture film)
- Canadian Design (silent lecture film)

== Legacy ==
Today Boulton's large collections of traditional music materials are found at several institutions. The Columbia University Center for Ethnomusicology has the Laura Boulton Collection of Traditional Music, with approximately 30,000 field recordings and accompanying documentation, purchased for Columbia in 1964. Boulton served as curator of this collection from 1962 to 1972. Boulton's liturgical music collection is found today at the Harvard University Archive of World Music, part of the Eda Kuhn Loeb Music Library. The Music Library has digitized this collection and made it available on the World Wide Web.

The Archive of Folk Culture at the Library of Congress contains wax cylinders, aluminum discs and reel-to-reel tapes of Boulton's field recordings of traditional vocal and instrumental music worldwide, with accompanying catalogs and commentaries. The Smithsonian Institution Film Archives contains the originals of her film footage from 1934 to 1979, including collaborative films with the National Film Board of Canada. Smithsonian Folkways has the originals of recordings Boulton made for Folkways Records.

From 1972 to 1977, Boulton took her personal collection with her to teach at Arizona State University. This collection, later named "The Laura Boulton Collection of World Music and Musical Instruments" came to Indiana University, Bloomington in 1996 from Arizona State and the Laura Boulton Foundation. The musical instruments are housed at the Mathers Museum of World Cultures, while the remaining materials are at the Archives of Traditional Music.

In 1977, Boulton started the Laura Boulton Foundation in New York City, a non-profit institution dedicated to supporting ethnomusicological research. Through the Foundation, Indiana University awards junior and senior Laura Boulton fellowships, designed for researchers to work with these materials.
