= Ron Weyman =

British-Canadian film and television director

Ronald Charles Tosh Weyman (December 13, 1915 – June 26, 2007) was a British-born Canadian film and television director and producer. A documentary film director for the National Film Board of Canada from 1946 to 1953, and a director and producer of drama television programming for CBC Television from 1954 to 1980, he was most noted as director of the Canadian Film Award-winning documentary film After Prison, What?, and as a producer of The Serial, a CBC drama anthology series which spun off many of Canadian television's most important drama series of the 1960s.

== Background ==
Born in Erith, Kent in 1915, Weyman emigrated to St. Catharines, Ontario with his family in 1923. By the time he was a teenager the family had moved to Toronto, where Weyman attended high school. He served in the Royal Canadian Navy during World War II, attaining the rank of lieutenant commander. He married Alison Alford, the daughter of University of Toronto fine arts professor John Alford, while on leave in 1941, although she died of an epileptic seizure in 1943 while Weyman was on duty. A hobby painter, he painted several war scenes during this time which were subsequently acquired by the collections of the National Gallery of Canada and the Canadian War Museum.

== Career ==
After the war ended, Weyman went to Ottawa to consult with a curator at the National Gallery about becoming a professional artist, but on the same trip he met Sydney Newman and was convinced to work for the National Film Board. He made more than 20 films for the National Film Board, including After Prison, What?, the war documentary Out of the Ruins, and the workplace safety film The Safety Supervisor. During this time he remarried to Vanna Alford, Alison's sister.

He left formal employment at the NFB in 1953, and spent some time working in Italy on a documentary film for the United Nations. The following year he joined CBC Television after his sister, writer and One of a Kind panelist Rita Greer Allen, married early CBC producer Robert Allen.

For the CBC, Weyman directed and produced a number of television films, but became most noted as the creator and producer of The Serial, an anthology series which ran from 1963 to 1966. Initially created to dramatize Canadian novels such as Thomas Head Raddall's The Wings of the Night, Thomas B. Costain's The Son of a Hundred Kings and Morley Callaghan's More Joy in Heaven, in its later years the series expanded its focus when Weyman, drawing on his background in documentary film, began commissioning original television films which incorporated some documentary techniques into gritty, contemporary stories that addressed serious political and social issues. The most noted of these were Tell Them the Streets Are Dancing, which became the pilot for the television series Wojeck, and Mr. Member of Parliament, a limited series which became Quentin Durgens, M.P.. Following the end of The Serial, he used a similar model to develop the series McQueen and Corwin, and directed episodes of the comedy series Hatch's Mill.

In the 1970s, he continued to produce and direct television films for the CBC, including the miniseries The Albertans and adaptations of Margaret Laurence's novels The Fire-Dwellers and A Bird in the House.

After retiring from the CBC in 1980, he wrote and published the memoir In Love and War, as well as three mystery novels which reimagined Sherlock Holmes as having been sent to Canada after surviving Reichenbach Falls. He suffered a stroke in 2003 which left him partially paralyzed and unable to speak, and died on June 26, 2007, at his home in Flesherton, Ontario.
