= Roger Blais (filmmaker) =

Canadian film director and producer (1917–2012)

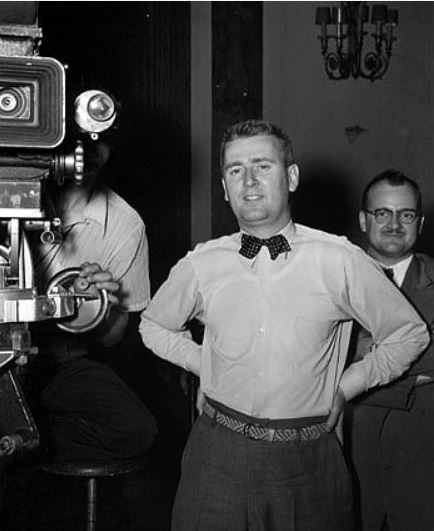
- Born: February 6, 1917; Giffard, Quebec, Canada
- Died: November 9, 2012 (aged 95); Sainte-Anne-de-Bellevue, Quebec, Canada
- Occupation: Documentary filmmaker
- Known for: Fridolinons, Royal Journey, Grierson

Roger Blais (February 6, 1917 – November 9, 2012) was a Canadian film director and producer, who played a key role in the development and expansion of the Quebec division of the National Film Board of Canada. As a filmmaker, he was most noted for the films Royal Journey and Grierson, both of which won the Canadian Film Award for Best Feature Length Documentary in 1952 and 1973, respectively.

== Background ==
Born in Giffard, Quebec, he studied painting at the École des Beaux-Arts in Quebec City before enlisting as a war artist during World War II; however, he actually spent much of the war as a non-combatant soldier in the English countryside after the general of the regiment to which he had been assigned refused to have an artist under his command on the grounds that the war would be won with guns rather than paintbrushes. When he returned to Canada, he married Louise Bellavance, and joined the National Film Board as an animator.

== NFB career ==
With the National Film Board, he began to transition from animation to the documentary department. His first significant NFB work was Fridolinons, a 1945 short film of three sketches performed by Gratien Gélinas as his comedic character Fridolin.

In 1964, he was selected as head of audiovisual production for Expo 67, overseeing all film and television aspects of the event. He held this role until the fair ended, before returning to the National Film Board.

In 1973 Blais released his most famous film, Grierson, a documentary portrait of NFB founder and documentary film innovator John Grierson.

== Honours ==
He was named an Officer of the Order of Canada in 2000, and a Knight of the Order of Quebec in 2005.
