= 21st Canadian Film Awards =

Canadian film awards ceremony

- Date: October 4, 1969
- Location: Royal York Hotel, Toronto, Ontario
- Hosted by: Fred Davis

Highlights
- Most awards: The Best Damn Fiddler from Calabogie to Kaladar
- Film of the Year: The Best Damn Fiddler from Calabogie to Kaladar

The 21st Canadian Film Awards were held on October 4, 1969 to honour achievements in Canadian film. The ceremony, attended by 1,200 people, was hosted by broadcaster Fred Davis.

As a result of 1968's selection process controversy, the judging process was revamped again. The pre-selection committees were dropped and one jury composed of an appointed member from each participating industry organization selected three nominees in each category, with the exception of Feature Films and Feature Crafts, which were chosen by an international jury.

The most unusual characteristic of this year's competition was that no theatrical feature film was awarded. Several films whose directors had intended to submit them were not completed by the submission deadline, the few features which were submitted were deemed not of award-worthy quality. There were many other Canadian features which could have been eligible but, due to cynicism, apathy and politics, they were not entered.

== Winners ==
=== Films ===
- Film of the Year: The Best Damn Fiddler from Calabogie to Kaladar - National Film Board of Canada, John Kemeny and Barrie Howells producers, Peter Pearson director
- Feature Film: Not awarded
- Film Under 30 Minutes: At Home - Allan King Associates, Martin Lavut director
- Film Over 30 Minutes: Vertige - National Film Board of Canada, Gilles Boivin and Clément Perron producers, Jean Beaudin director
- Documentary Under 30 Minutes: Juggernaut - National Film Board of Canada, Walford Hewitson producer, Eugene Boyko director
- Documentary Over 30 Minutes: Good Times Bad Times - Canadian Broadcasting Corporation, Donald Shebib producer and director
- Animated: Walking - National Film Board of Canada, Ryan Larkin producer and director
- TV Drama: The Best Damn Fiddler from Calabogie to Kaladar - National Film Board of Canada, John Kemeny and Barrie Howells producers, Peter Pearson director
- TV Information: The Style Is The Man Himself - Canadian Broadcasting Corporation, Cameron Graham producer
- Sports and Recreation: Les canots de glace (Ice Rally in Quebec) - Office du Film du Québec, Jean-Claude Labrecque producer
- Public Relations: Rye on the Rocks - Westminster Films, Don Haldane producer
- Sales Promotion: More Logs Follow the Leader - Peterson Productions, S. Dean Peterson producer

=== Technical Development and Innovation Awards ===
- Warren Collins for Musical Chairs
- Kar Liang and John Pley "for the application of computer control to animation stand cinematography".

=== Non-Feature Craft Awards ===
- Performance by a Lead Actor: Chris Wiggins - The Best Damn Fiddler from Calabogie to Kaladar (NFB)
- Performance by a Lead Actress: Jackie Burroughs - Dulcima (CBC)
- Supporting Actor: Michael Posner - And No Birds Sing (University of Manitoba Students' Union, Pasquefilm)
- Supporting Actress: Ruth Springford - Corwin: Does Anybody Here Know Denny? (CBC)
- Art Direction: Michael Milne - The Best Damn Fiddler from Calabogie to Kaladar (NFB)
- Black-and-White Cinematography: Tony Ianzelo - The Best Damn Fiddler from Calabogie to Kaladar (NFB)
- Colour Cinematography: Réo Grégoire - Là ou Ailleurs (No Matter Where) (NFB)
- Direction: Peter Pearson - The Best Damn Fiddler from Calabogie to Kaladar (NFB)
- Film Editing: Michael McKennirey - The Best Damn Fiddler from Calabogie to Kaladar (NFB)
- Sound Editing: Donald Shebib - Good Times Bad Times (CBC)
- Screenplay: Joan Finnigan - The Best Damn Fiddler from Calabogie to Kaladar (NFB)
- Written Commentary: James Carney - In One Day (NFB)
- Sound Recording: Hans Oomes - Saul Alinsky Went to War (NFB)
- Sound Re-Recording: Ron Alexander - Les canots de glace (Office du Film du Québec)

== Special awards ==
- Margot Kidder, "in recognition of an outstanding new talent for Corwin: Does Anybody Here Know Denny? (CBC)
- Serge Gerand, "for outstanding original achievement in Motion Pictures scoring in Vertige".
- John Drainie Award: Andrew Allan, for "distinguished service to broadcasting".
- Wendy Michener Award: Jean-Claude Labrecque "for outstanding artistic achievement".
