= Tony Ianzelo =

Canadian documentary film director (born 1935)

- Born: June 13, 1935; Toronto, Ontario
- Education: Ryerson Institute of Technology
- Occupations: cinematographer, director
- Awards: Order of Canada; Royal Canadian Academy of Arts

Tony Ianzelo OC RCA (born June 13, 1935) is a Canadian documentary director and cinematographer.

== Career ==
Ianzelo was born in Toronto, Ontario, and attended Toronto's Ryerson Institute of Technology. His career at the National Film Board of Canada was characterized by an empathic portrayal of his subjects, and he gained a reputation for compassion and honesty through sensitive films and unobtrusive cinematography.

He joined the NFB in 1960 as a camera assistant and, in 1966, made his first film, Antonio. This short piece, which uses his own father as a subject to explore the themes of family, immigration and alienation, was shown in schools and institutions for three decades after its release. A prolific and innovative artist, he retired in the late 1990s with over one hundred film credits.

Best known for his quiet empathy and unobtrusive camera-work, he worked with the NFB program Challenge for Change, where he used his skills on such films as Cree Hunters of Mistassini with Boyce Richardson, and other projects in Canada's Far North. In 1986, with Colin Low, he co-directed Transitions, the first-ever 3D IMAX film, which premiered at Expo 86 in Vancouver.

Ianzelo was one of the first cinematographers to become a member of the Royal Canadian Academy of Arts, and received numerous awards and commendations, including the 1975 BAFTA Award for Best Documentary (for Cree Hunters of Mistassini) and two Academy Award nominations (for Blackwood in 1976 and High Grass Circus in 1977). In 2004, in recognition of his lifetime contribution to documentary cinema, he was invested as Member of the Order of Canada

== Filmography ==
(All for the National Film Board of Canada)

- Antonio - documentary short 1966 - director, cinematographer, editor
- The Ever-Changing Lowlands - documentary short 1966 - director, cinematographer
- All Systems Go - documentary short, Richard Gilbert 1966 - cinematographer
- The Long Haul Men - documentary short, Richard Gilbert 1966 - cinematographer
- Canada and the American Revolution: 1763-1783 - documentary, Ronald Dick and Pierre L’Amare 1967 - cinematographer
- The Accessible Arctic - documentary short, David Bairstow 1967 - cinematographer
- Inmate Training - training film, Peter Pearson 1967 - cinematographer
- A Question of Priority - training film, Peter Pearson 1967 - cinematographer
- Chain of Command - training film, Peter Pearson 1967 - cinematographer
- Compassionate Leave? - training film, Peter Pearson 1967 - cinematographer
- The Tactless One - training film, Peter Pearson 1967 - cinematographer
- The Defaulter - training film, Peter Pearson 1967 - cinematographer
- Impressions of Expo ‘67 - documentary short, William Brind 1967 - cinematographer
- Isotopes in Action - documentary short, Kenneth McCready 1967 - cinematographer
- The North Has Changed - documentary short, David Bairstow 1967 - cinematographer
- We’re Gonna Have Recess - documentary short, Michael J.F. Scott 1967 - cinematographer
- New England and New France: 1490-1763 - documentary, Ronald Dick and Pierre L’Amare 1967 - cinematographer
- Oskee Wee Wee - documentary short, William Pettigrew 1968 - cinematographer
- Saul Alinksy Went to War - documentary, Peter Pearson and Donald Brittain 1968 - cinematographer
- Cosmic Zoom - documentary short, Robert Verrall 1968 - cinematographer
- Flight in White - documentary short, William Canning 1968 - cinematographer
- The New Equation: Annexationism and Reciprocity: 1840-1860 - documentary, Ronald Dick and Pierre L’Amare 1968 - cinematographer
- Dangerous Decades: 1818-1846 - documentary, Ronald Dick and Pierre L’Amare 1968 - cinematographer
- People and Power - documentary short, Bonnie Sherr Klein and Peter Pearson 1968 - cinematographer
- Building an Organization - documentary short, Bonnie Sherr Klein and Peter Pearson 1968 - cinematographer
- A Continuing Responsibility - documentary short, Bonnie Sherr Klein 1968 - cinematographer
- Deciding to Organize - documentary short, Bonnie Sherr Klein and Peter Pearson 1968 - cinematographer
- Through Conflict to Negotiation - documentary, Bonnie Sherr Klein and Peter Pearson 1968 - cinematographer
- They’re Putting Us Off the Map - documentary short, Michael J.F. Scott 1968 - cinematographer
- Mrs. Ryan’s Drama Class - documentary short, Michael Rubbo 1969 - cinematographer
- The Dowry - short film, Peter Pearson 1969 - cinematographer
- Altitude Zero to Infinity - documentary short, Richard Gilbert 1969 - cinematographer
- Bing Bang Boom - documentary short, Joan Henson 1969 - cinematographer
- You Are on Indian Land - documentary short, Mike Kanentakeron Mitchell 1969 - cinematographer
- The Best Damn Fiddler from Calabogie to Kaladar - documentary, Peter Pearson 1969 - cinematographer
- The War of 1812: Causes and Consequences: 1783-1818 - documentary, Ronald Dick and Pierre L’Amare 1967 - cinematographer
- The Friendly 50s and the Sinister Sixties: 1850-1863 - documentary, Ronald Dick and Pierre L’Amare 1969 - cinematographer
- The Triumphant Union and the Canadian Confederation: 1863-1867 - documentary, Ronald Dick and Pierre L’Amare 1969 - cinematographer
- The Border Confirmed: The Treaty of Washington: 1867-1871 - documentary, Ronald Dick and Pierre L’Amare 1969 - cinematographer
- A Second Transcontinental Nation: 1872 - documentary, Ronald Dick and Pierre L’Amare 1969 - cinematographer
- Go With Us - documentary short, William Canning 1970 - cinematographer
- Freud: The Hidden Nature of Man - documentary short (non-NFB), George Kaczender 1970 - cinematographer
- Don't Knock the Ox - documentary short 1970 - director, cinematographer
- Fort Who? - documentary short, William Brind 1970 - cinematographer
- Here’s to Harry’s Grandfather - documentary, Michael Rubbo 1970 - cinematographer
- Tee-Won Short - documentary short, Michael J.F. Scott 1970 - cinematographer
- That’s the Price - documentary, Michael J.F. Scott 1970 - cinematographer
- Temples of Time - documentary, William Canning 1971 - cinematographer
- The Unplanned - documentary short, Andy Thomson 1971 - cinematographer
- Angus - documentary short, Andy Thomson and Michael J.F. Scott 1971 - cinematographer
- Don Messer - His Land and His Music - documentary, Martin Defalco 1971 - cinematographer
- En Garde - documentary short, William Canning 1971 - cinematographer
- God Help the Man Who Would Part with His Land - documentary short, George C. Stoney 1971 - cinematographer
- Here is Canada - documentary short 1972 - director, cinematographer
- A Bus - For Us - documentary short, Rex Tasker 1972 - cinematographer
- Goodbye Sousa - documentary short 1973 - director, cinematographer
- Our Land is Our Life - documentary 1974 - cinematographer and, with Boyce Richardson, director
- Bate's Car: Sweet as a Nut - documentary short 1974 - director, cinematographer
- Cree Hunters of Mistassini - documentary 1974 - cinematographer and, with Boyce Richardson, director
- Ready When You Are - documentary short, John N. Smith and Douglas Kiefer 1975 - cinematographer
- Bill Loosely’s Heat Pump - documentary short, Kenneth McCready 1975 - cinematographer
- Cold Journey - feature, Martin Defalco 1975 - cinematographer
- Alberta Girls - documentary 1975 - cinematographer, editor and, with Malca Gillson, director
- Musicanada - documentary short 1975 - cinematographer and, with Malca Gillson, director
- Blackwood - documentary short 1976 - director, cinematographer
- High Grass Circus - documentary short 1976 - cinematographer and, with Torben Schioler, director
- Striker - documentary short, Robert Nichol 1976 - cinematographer
- The Whales Are Waiting - documentary short 1976 - cinematographer and, with Strowen Robertson and Andy Thomson, director
- Cree Way - documentary short 1977 - director, cinematographer
- Little Big Top - documentary short 1977 - cinematographer, editor and, with Torben Schioler, director
- Games of the XXI Olympiad - documentary, Jean-Claude Labrecque, Jean Beaudin, Marcel Carrière and Georges Dufaux 1977
- The Mighty Steam Calliope - documentary short 1978 - cinematographer and director
- Viking Visitors to North America - documentary short 1979 - cinematographer and, with Anthony Kent, director
- Canada Vignettes: Don Messer - His Land and His Music - Don Messer 1910-1973 - documentary short, Martin Defalco 1979 - cinematographer
- Canada Vignettes: Don Messer - His Land and His Music - Charlie Chamberlain 1911-1972, Marg Osburne 1927-1977 - documentary short, Martin Defalco 1979 - cinematographer
- Canada Vignettes: Don Messer - His Land and His Music - Charlie Chamberlain 1911-1972 - two documentary shorts, Martin Defalco 1979 - cinematographer
- Canada Vignettes: Don Messer - His Land and His Music - Marg Osburne 1927-1977 - two documentary shorts, Martin Defalco 1979 - cinematographer
- Canada Vignettes: Cree Hunters - documentary short 1979 - director, cinematographer
- Canada Vignettes: Breadmakers - documentary short 1980 - director, cinematographer
- Canada Vignettes: Calliope - documentary short 1980 - director, cinematographer
- China: A Land Transformed - documentary short 1980 - cinematographer and, with Boyce Richardson, director
- North China Commune - documentary 1980 - cinematographer and, with Boyce Richardson, director
- North China Factory - documentary 1980 - cinematographer and, with Boyce Richardson, director
- Wuxing People’s Commune - documentary 1980 - cinematographer and, with Boyce Richardson, director
- Canada Vignettes: Celebration - documentary short 1981 - director, cinematographer
- In Search of Farley Mowat - documentary, William Brind 1981 - cinematographer
- Gala - documentary, John N. Smith and Michael McKennirey 1982 - cinematographer
- The Concert Man - documentary short 1982 - director, cinematographer
- Learning Ringette - documentary short 1982 - cinematographer and, with Bill Graziadei, director
- Singing: A Joy in Any Language - documentary 1983 - cinematographer and, with Malca Gillson, director
- Musical Magic: Gilbert and Sullivan in Stratford - documentary, Malca Gillson 1984 - cinematographer
- From Ashes to Forest - documentary 1984 - director, cinematographer
- Max Ward - documentary, William Canning 1984 - cinematographer
- Overtime - documentary, Marrin Canell 1984 - cinematographer
- Transitions - documentary short 1986 - director, with Colin Low
- Making Transitions - documentary short 1986 - director
- Feeding and Clothing China's Millions - documentary short, Dennis Sawyer 1986 - cinematographer
- School in the Bush - documentary short, Dennis Sawyer 1986 - cinematographer
- Give Me Your Answer True - documentary 1987 - director, with Stefan Wodoslawsky
- Tiger Emperor - documentary short 1988 - director
- Emergency - documentary short 1988 - director, with Colin Low
- The First Emperor of China - documentary 1989 - director, with Liu Hao Xue
- Momentum - documentary short 1992 - director, with Colin Low
- The Art of the Animator - documentary series 1993 - director, cinematographer
- Eldon Rathburn: They Shoot... He Scores - documentary short, Louis Hone 1995 - cinematographer
- Making Momentum - documentary short 1996 - director, with Colin Low
- Louisbourg Under Siege - documentary, Albert Kish 1997 - cinematographer
- Postcards from Canada - documentary 2000 - director, cinematographer

== Awards ==
Cosmic Zoom (1968)

- Berlin International Film Festival – UNIATEC Award of Excellence, 1972

The Best Damn Fiddler from Calabogie to Kaladar (1969)

- 21st Canadian Film Awards, Toronto: Genie Award for Best Black and White Cinematography, 1969

Don't Knock the Ox (1970)

- Canadian Film Awards, Toronto – Genie Award for Best Theatrical Short Film, 1971
- Film Critics and Journalists Association of Ceylon, Sri Lanka – Certificate of Merit, 1971

Here is Canada (1972)

- Festival of Tourist and Folklore Films, Brussels - Award of the Ministry of National Education, 1973
- Golden Gate Awards Competition & International Film Festival, San Francisco – Special Jury Award, 1973

Goodbye Sousa (1973)

- Canadian Film Awards, Montreal – Genie Award for Best Theatrical Short Film, 1973

Cree Hunters of Mistassini (1974)

- BAFTA (British Academy Film Awards), London – BAFTA Award for Best Documentary (Robert Flaherty Award), 1975
- Canadian Film Awards, Niagara-on-the-Lake, ON - Genie Award for Best Documentary, 1975
- Melbourne Film Festival – Silver Boomerang, Best film made specifically for TV, 1975

Bate's Car: Sweet as a Nut (1974)

- Biofest, Novi Sad, Yugoslavia – Award of Excellence, 1975

Musicanada (1975)

- Golden Gate Awards Competition & International Film Festival, San Francisco – Special Jury Award, 1976

Blackwood (1976)

- Festival international du film sur l'art, Paris: Grand Prize for the Quality of the Image, 1977
- Festival of Tourist and Folklore Films, Brussels: Prize of the Principality of Monaco for the Best Film Evocating the Past of a Region by the Means of Art, 1977
- Yorkton Film Festival, Yorkton, Saskatchewan: Golden Sheaf Award, Best Short Film, 1977
- 49th Academy Awards, Los Angeles: Nominee, Best Documentary Short Subject, 1977

High Grass Circus (1976)

- Yorkton Film Festival, Yorkton, Saskatchewan - Golden Sheaf Award for Best Film of the Festival, 1977
- Film Advisory Board, Los Angeles - Award of Excellence, 1978
- 50th Academy Awards, Los Angeles – Nominee, Best Documentary Feature

North China Commune (1980)

- Columbus International Film & Animation Festival, Columbus, Ohio - Chris Bronze Plaque, Social Studies, 1980

From Ashes to Forest (1984)

- International Green Film Week, Berlin - Bronze Ear of Corn Award, Environment, 1986

Momentum (1992)

- FIAFest: Festival Internacional Audiovisual, Seville - Award for the Technical Quality of the Image, 1992

The Art of the Animator (1993)

- National Educational Media Network Competition, Oakland, California – Golden Apple Award, Arts, 1995
