= John Kemeny (film producer) =

Hungarian-born Canadian film producer (1925-2012)

- Born: 17 April 1925; Budapest, Hungary
- Died: 23 November 2012 (aged 87); Sedona, Arizona, U.S.
- Occupations: Producer, director, editor
- Years active: 1959–1998

John Kemeny (1925 – 2012) was a Hungarian-Canadian film producer whom the Toronto Star called "the forgotten giant of Canadian film history and...the most successful producer in Canadian history." His production credits include The Apprenticeship of Duddy Kravitz, Atlantic City, and Quest for Fire.

== Early career ==
John Kemeny was born in Budapest and, at a young age, forged a career in the film business, working in distribution and promotion. Following the Hungarian Revolution of 1956, he moved to Montreal where, in 1959, he was hired by the National Film Board of Canada (NFB). He began as an editor, then moved to directing but it was evident that his talent lay in producing. While at the NFB, he edited, wrote, directed and/or produced 100 films, including Memorandum, Ladies and Gentlemen... Mr. Leonard Cohen, The Things I Cannot Change, The Best Damn Fiddler from Calabogie to Kaladar and Don't Let the Angels Fall.

== International Cinemedia Center ==
In 1971, Kemeny left the NFB, along with three NFB colleagues: Joe Koenig, George Kaczender and Don Duprey. They formed International Cinemedia Center Productions (ICC), with the aim of producing documentaries and educational films. In 1973, the prominent director Ted Kotcheff returned to Montreal from London and, with his friend Mordecai Richler, starting developing the film version of Richler’s book The Apprenticeship of Duddy Kravitz. Kemeny had the reputation of being a calm, precise and budget-conscious producer and the deal was struck for ICC to produce the film. It was a massive success. The Apprenticeship of Duddy Kravitz grossed $1.7 million, won several awards and was ranked, by the Toronto International Film Festival, in the Top 10 Canadian Films of All Time.

The success of Duddy Kravitz led to a three-picture deal with Columbia Pictures. Kemeny produced Ice Castles, Shadow of the Hawk and White Line Fever; Ice Castles was a success; White Line Fever grossed $35 million on a $1.4 million budget.

== International Cinema Inc. ==
In 1978, Don Duprey returned to the NFB and Joe Koenig left the group to form Interactive Image Technologies (which would become Electronics Workbench). Kemeny was joined by his friend, the Quebec filmmaker Denis Héroux, and ICC became International Cinema Inc. The company produced eleven films in six years, most notably Atlantic City and Quest for Fire.

== Alliance Entertainment ==
In 1984, Kemeny and Héroux merged International Cinema with RSL Entertainment, the company of producers Stephen J. Roth, Andras Hamori, Susan Cavan and Robert Lantos, to form Alliance Entertainment. The company saw immediate and stunning success, producing at least six projects a year, including features, TV movies and series (in 1998, it became Alliance Atlantis Communications). Perhaps because of the pace, Kemeny left Alliance in 1991. He had already produced several films for HBO and would produce three more, including The Josephine Baker Story, before retiring in 1997.

== Personal life and death ==
Kemeny was married three times; the last to Margaret who he married in 1964. Kemeny retired in 1996. He and Margaret, who was also Hungarian, returned to Europe, dividing their time between homes in Hungary and Spain. With the increasingly-unpleasant political situation in Hungary, and the desire for a warm climate, they bought a house in Sedona, Arizona. Kemeny was a citizen of Hungary and Canada, and his Green card had lapsed; from Spain, they waged a stressful two-year legal battle to be permitted to live in the US. In September 2012, they were allowed to return. Two weeks after their arrival, Kemeny was diagnosed with cancer. He died one month later, on November 23, at age 87. He was pre-deceased by a daughter and was survived by his wife and one son.

== Legacy ==
At the 12th Genie Awards in 1991, the Academy of Canadian Cinema & Television awarded Kemeny the Special Achievement Genie in recognition of his contribution to the Canadian film industry.

Upon his death, Robert Lantos told the Toronto Star: "John was a producer of extraordinary accomplishments. Because he never promoted himself, preferring to stay in the shadow, few in the Canadian industry today know who he is. By the time he retired 15 years ago, he had accomplished more than any other Canadian producer - ever. Five Oscar nominations for Atlantic City including Best Picture (still the only Canadian film ever nominated in this), and the Golden Lion in Venice. An Oscar nomination and the Golden Bear in Berlin for Duddy Kravitz. The César (French Oscar) for best picture and an Oscar nomination for Quest For Fire. No other Canadian film has ever won either the top Berlin or the top Venice prize. He won them both, as well as a multitude of Genie Awards for these and for other films like The Bay Boy. He made some of the most distinguished HBO movies ever, such as Murderers Among Us: The Simon Wiesenthal Story, and The Josephine Baker Story, which was nominated for twelve Emmy Awards and won five. He also made major commercial hits for Hollywood Studios, such as Ice Castles and White Line Fever. He was a pioneer and a perfectionist and a founding partner of Alliance. Homage should be paid."

== Filmography ==
National Film Board of Canada

- The Inquiring Mind - documentary short, David Bairstow 1959 - editor
- Dykes for Dry Land - documentary short, Donald Wilder 1959 - editor
- Grassland Farming - documentary short, Donald Wilder 1959 - editor
- On Prescription Only - documentary short, Julian Biggs 1960 - editor
- Men Against the Ice - documentary short, David Bairstow 1960 - editor
- Steering North - documentary short, David Bairstow 1960 - editor
- Cash Advances for Prairie Grain - documentary short, Ernest Reid 1961 - editor
- Everybody’s Prejudiced - documentary short, Donald Brittain 1961 - editor
- Henry Larsen’s Northwest Passages - documentary short, David Bairstow 1962 - editor
- The Boy Next Door - short film, Ernest Reid 1962 - editor
- What Farm Price Support Means to You - documentary short, Ernest Reid 1962 - editor
- Canada at War: Days of Infamy - documentary short, Donald Brittain, Peter Jones & Stanley Clish 1962 - editor
- Canada at War: Turn of the Tide - documentary short, Donald Brittain, Peter Jones & Stanley Clish 1962 - editor
- Canada at War: Road to Ortona - documentary short, Donald Brittain & Stanley Clish 1962 - editor
- Canada at War: New Directions - documentary short, Donald Brittain & Stanley Clish 1962 - editor
- Canada at War: Crisis on the Hill - documentary short, Donald Brittain & Stanley Clish 1962 - editor
- Canada at War: The Clouded Dawn - documentary short, Donald Brittain & Stanley Clish 1962 - editor
- Canada at War: Dusk - documentary short, Donald Brittain & Stanley Clish 1962 - editor
- Drylanders - documentary short, Don Haldane 1963 - editor
- The Early Journeys of Vilhjalmur Stefansson - documentary short, David Bairstow 1963 - editor
- The Later Journeys of Vilhjalmur Stefansson - documentary short, David Bairstow 1963 - editor
- Memories and Predictions - documentary short, David Bairstow 1963 - editor
- Wedding Day - documentary short, Julian Biggs, Hector Lemieux & John Howe 1963 - editor
- Three Grandmothers - documentary short, Julian Biggs & John Howe 1963 - editor
- Bethune - documentary, Donald Brittain 1964 - writer, editor, producer
- Three Country Boys - documentary short 1964 - co-director
- Three Fishermen - documentary short 1964 - co-director
- The Visit - documentary short 1964 – director
- Stefansson: The Arctic Prophet - documentary short 1965 - director and producer
- Henry Larsen - documentary short 1965 - director and producer
- Ladies and Gentlemen... Mr. Leonard Cohen - documentary, Donald Brittain & Don Owen 1965 - producer
- Miner - documentary short, Robin Spry 1965 - producer
- Two Men of Montreal - documentary, Suzanne Angel, Donald Brittain & Don Owen 1965 - producer
- You're No Good - short film, George Kaczender 1965 - producer
- Level 4350 - documentary short, Robin Spry 1965 - producer
- Little White Crimes - short film, George Kaczender 1966 - producer
- No Reason to Stay - short film, Mort Ransen 1966 - producer
- The Long Haul Men - documentary short, Michael Rubbo 1966 - producer
- The Merry-Go-Round - documentary short, Tanya Ballantyne & Tanya Tree 1966 - producer
- Trawler Fishermen - documentary short, Martin Defalco 1966 - producer
- The Game - short film, George Kaczender 1966 - producer
- Pikangikum - documentary short, John Gould 1967 - producer
- Andrew Britt at Shoal Bay - documentary short, Colin Low 1967 - producer
- Indian Dialogue - documentary short, David Hughes 1967 - producer
- A Wedding and Party - documentary short, Colin Low 1967 - producer
- A Woman’s Place - documentary short, Colin Low 1967 - producer
- Fishermen’s Meeting - documentary short, Colin Low 1967 - producer
- Fogo’s Expatriates - documentary short, Colin Low 1967 - producer
- Billy Crane Moves Away - documentary short, Colin Low 1967 - producer
- Brian Earle on Merchants and Welfare - documentary short, Colin Low 1967 - producer
- Citizen Discussions - documentary short, Colin Low 1967 - producer
- Dan Roberts on Fishing - documentary short, Colin Low 1967 - producer
- Jim Decker Builds a Longliner - documentary short, Colin Low 1967 - producer
- Jim Decker’s Party - documentary short, Colin Low 1967 - producer
- Joe Kinsella on Education - documentary short, Colin Low 1967 - producer
- McGraths at Home and Fishing - documentary short, Colin Low 1967 - producer
- Encounter at Kwacha House - Halifax - documentary short, Rex Tasker 1967 - producer
- Encounter with Saul Alinsky - Part 1: CYC Toronto - documentary short, Peter Pearson 1967 - producer
- Encounter with Saul Alinsky - Part 2: Rama Indian Reserve - documentary short, Peter Pearson 1967 - producer
- Indian Relocation - Elliot Lake: A Report - documentary short, David Hughes & D'Arcy Marsh 1967 - producer
- Madawaska Valley - documentary short, John Ormond 1967 - producer
- Ride for Your Life - documentary short, Robin Spry 1967 - producer
- Sabre and Foil - documentary short, George Kaczender 1967 - producer
- The Children of Fogo Island - documentary short, Colin Low 1967 - producer
- Some Problems of Fogo - documentary short, Colin Low 1967 - producer
- Discussion on Welfare - documentary short, Colin Low 1967 - producer
- The Fogo Island Improvement Committee - documentary short, Colin Low 1967 - producer
- The Founding of the Co-operatives - documentary short, Colin Low 1967 - producer
- The Mercer Family - documentary short, Colin Low 1967 - producer
- The Merchant and the Teacher - documentary short, Colin Low 1967 - producer
- The Songs of Chris Cobb - documentary short, Colin Low 1967 - producer
- The Story of the Up Top - documentary short, Colin Low 1967 - producer
- Thoughts on Fogo and Norway - documentary short, Colin Low 1967 - producer
- Tom Best on Co-operatives - documentary short, Colin Low 1967 - producer
- Two Cabinet Ministers - documentary short, Colin Low 1967 - producer
- William Wells Talks About the Island - documentary short, Colin Low 1967 - producer
- The Halifax Neighbourhood Center Project - documentary short, Rex Tasker 1967 - producer
- The Things I Cannot Change - documentary, Tanya Ballantyne 1967 - producer
- Memorandum - documentary, Donald Brittain & John Spotton 1967 - producer
- The Circle - documentary, Mort Ransen 1967 - producer
- A Continuing Responsibility - documentary short, Bonnie Sherr Klein 1968 - producer
- Introduction to Fogo Island - documentary short, Colin Low 1968 - producer
- Building an Organization - documentary short, Peter Pearson & Bonnie Sherr Klein 1968 - producer
- People and Power - documentary short, Bonnie Sherr Klein 1968 - producer
- Deciding to Organize - documentary short, Peter Pearson & Bonnie Sherr Klein 1968 - producer
- Through Conflict to Negotiation - documentary short, Bonnie Sherr Klein 1968 - producer
- Saul Alinsky Went to War - documentary, Donald Brittain 1968 - producer
- The Best Damn Fiddler from Calabogie to Kaladar - short film, Peter Pearson 1968 - producer
- Don't Let the Angels Fall - feature, George Kaczender 1968 - producer
- Falling from Ladders - documentary short, Mort Ransen 1969 - producer
- Passing Through Sweden - documentary short, Martin Duckworth 1969 - producer
- The Land - documentary short, Rex Tasker & Jean-Claude Labrecque 1969 - producer
- A Place for Everything - documentary short, Eric M. Nilsson 1970 - producer
- Overspill - documentary short, Mort Ransen 1970 - producer
- The Burden They Carry - documentary short, Mort Ransen 1970 - producer
- The City: Osaka - animated short film, Kaj Pindal 1970 - producer
- Untouched and Pure - documentary, Christopher Cordeaux, Mort Ransen & Martin Duckworth 1970 - producer
- Canada the Land - documentary short, Rex Tasker & Jean-Claude Labrecque 1971 - producer
- 7 fois... par jour - feature, Denis Héroux 1971 - producer (independent)

International Cinemedia Center Productions

- Marxism: The Theory That Split the World - documentary short, George Kaczender 1970 - producer
- Freud: The Hidden Nature of Man - documentary short, George Kaczender 1970 – producer
- Newton: The Mind That Found the Future - documentary short, George Kaczender 1970 – producer
- Two Grasslands: Texas and Iran - documentary short, George Kaczender 1970 - producer
- Food: The Story of a Peanut Butter Sandwich - documentary short, George Kaczender 1970 – producer
- Top of the World: Taiga, Tundra, Ice Cap - documentary short, George Kaczender 1971 - producer
- Brown Wolf - short film, George Kaczender 1972 - producer
- The Apprenticeship of Duddy Kravitz - feature, Ted Kotcheff 1974 - producer
- White Line Fever - feature, Jonathan Kaplan 1975 – producer
- Medieval Myths and Medicine - documentary short, George Kaczender 1975 - producer
- Evolution of the Appalachians - animated film, (for the NFB) 1976 - producer
- Volcanism: Eruption of Kilauea, Hawaii - short film, 1976 - producer
- Shadow of the Hawk - feature, George McCowan 1976 - producer
- Ice Castles - feature, Donald Wrye 1979 - producer

International Cinema Inc.

- Atlantic City - feature, Louis Malle 1980 - producer
- Quest for Fire - feature, Jean-Jacques Annaud 1981 - producer
- The Plouffe Family - feature, Gilles Carle 1981 - producer
- The Crime of Ovide Plouffe - mini-series, Denys Arcand & Gilles Carle 1984 - producer
- The Bay Boy - feature, Daniel Petrie 1984 - producer
- The Blood of Others - feature, Claude Chabrol 1984 - producer
- Louisiana - TV movie, Philippe de Broca 1984 - producer
- The Alley Cat (a.k.a. Le matou) - feature, Jean Beaudin 1985 - producer
- The Park Is Mine - TV movie, Steven Hilliard Stern 1985 - producer
- Jayce and the Wheeled Warriors - TV series, 65 episodes, 1985 - producer
- The Boy in Blue - feature, Charles Jarrott 1986 - producer

Alliance Entertainment

- Sword of Gideon - feature, Michael Anderson 1986 - executive producer
- The Wraith - feature, Mike Marvin 1986 - executive producer
- Nowhere to Hide - feature, Mario Philip Azzopardi 1987 - producer
- Iron Eagle II - feature, Sidney J. Furie 1988 - producer
- The Gate - feature, Tibor Takács 1987 - executive producer
- The Gate II: Trespassers - feature, Tibor Takács 1990 - executive producer
- Hungarian Requiem - feature, Károly Makk 1991 - producer

HBO

- Red King, White Knight - TV Movie, Geoff Murphy 1989 - producer
- Murderers Among Us: The Simon Wiesenthal Story - feature, Brian Gibson 1989 - producer
- The Josephine Baker Story - TV movie, Brian Gibson 1991 - producer
- Teamster Boss: The Jackie Presser Story - TV movie, Alastair Reid 1992 - producer
- Dead Silence - TV movie, Daniel Petrie Jr. 1997 - producer
- When Trumpets Fade - TV movie, John Irvin 1998 – producer

== Awards ==
(List excludes awards in the directing, acting and/or craft categories)

Bethune (1964)

- International Festival for Documentary and Animated Film, Leipzig, Germany: First Prize, TV, 1965
- International Festival of Red Cross and Health Films, Sofia, Bulgaria: Gold Medal, 1967
- Edinburgh International Film Festival, Edinburgh, Scotland: Diploma of Honour, 1965
- Melbourne International Film Festival, Melbourne: Diploma of Merit, 1966
- Salerno Film Festival, Salerno, Italy: Second Prize, 1968

Ladies and Gentlemen... Mr. Leonard Cohen (1965)

- 18th Canadian Film Awards, Montreal: Genie Award for Best Film, TV Information, 1966
- American Film and Video Festival, New York: Blue Ribbon, Literature, 1966
- International Festival of Short Films, Philadelphia: Award for Exceptional Merit, 1968

No Reason to Stay (1966)

- American Film and Video Festival, New York: Blue Ribbon, Personal Guidance, 1967
- Columbus International Film & Animation Festival, Columbus, Ohio: Chris Award, Education & Information, 1967
- La Plata International Children's Film Festival, La Plata, Argentina: Best Film of the Festival - Gold Plaque, 1968
- Annual Landers Associates Awards, New York: Award of Merit, 1966
- Melbourne International Film Festival, Melbourne: Diploma of Merit, 1967
- International Exhibition of Scientific Film, Buenos Aires: Diploma of Honour, 1968

The Things I Cannot Change (1967)

- Golden Gate International Film Festival, San Francisco: Award for Excellence in Network Presentation, 1967
- International Short Film Festival Oberhausen, Oberhausen, Germany: Diploma of Merit, 1968
- Montreal International Film Festival, Montreal: Special Mention Mention, Medium-Length Films, 1967
- Conference on Children, Washington, DC: Certificate of Merit, 1970
- 21st British Academy Film Awards, London: Nominee: BAFTA Award for Best Documentary, 1968

Memorandum (1967)

- Venice Film Festival, Venice: First Prize, Lion of St. Mark, 1966
- Golden Gate International Film Festival, San Francisco: First Prize, Essay, 1966
- Vancouver International Film Festival, Vancouver: Certificate of Merit, Television Films, 1966
- Montreal International Film Festival, Montreal: Special Mention, Medium-Length Films, 1966

The Children of Fogo Island (1967)

- Conference on Children, Washington, DC: Certificate of Merit, 1970

Sabre and Foil (1967)

- International Sports Film Festival, Cortina d'Ampezzo, Italy: Silver Medal, 1969

Ride for Your Life (1967)

- International Short Film Festival Oberhausen, Oberhausen, Germany: Best in Category, 1968
- Melnik Automobile Club Festival, Prague: First Prize, 1969

Don't Let the Angels Fall (1968)

- Film Critics and Journalists Association of Ceylon, Colombo, Sri Lanka: Best Foreign Feature Film, 1971

The Best Damn Fiddler from Calabogie to Kaladar (1968)

- 21st Canadian Film Awards, Toronto: Genie Award for Film of the Year, 1969
- 21st Canadian Film Awards, Toronto: Genie Award for Best TV Drama, 1969
- Melbourne International Film Festival, Melbourne: Diploma of Merit, 1970

Saul Alinsky Went to War (1968)

- Columbus International Film & Animation Festival, Columbus, Ohio: Chris Award, 1970

Falling from Ladders (1969)

- International Festival of Short Films, Philadelphia: Award for Exceptional Merit, 1971

Untouched and Pure (1970)

- Chicago International Film Festival, Chicago: Silver Hugo, Education, 1970

Canada the Land (1971)

- International Festival of Tourism Films, Palma de Mallorca, Spain: Silver Bull Award, 1973
- International Festival of Sports and Tourist Films, Kranj, Yugoslavia: Diploma of Merit, 1972

The Apprenticeship of Duddy Kravitz (1974)

- Berlin International Film Festival, Berlin: Golden Bear, Best Film, 1974
- 26th Canadian Film Awards, Niagara-on-the-Lake, ON: Film of the Year, 1974
- 32nd Golden Globe Awards, Los Angeles: Nominee, Best Foreign Film, 1975

Atlantic City (1980)

- Venice Film Festival, Venice, Italy: Golden Lion, 1980
- 1981 National Society of Film Critics Awards, New York: Best Picture, 1981
- Los Angeles Film Critics Association Awards, Los Angeles: Best Picture, 1981
- Fotogramas de Plata, Madrid: Best Foreign Film, 1982
- Sant Jordi Awards, Barcelona: Best Foreign Film, 1982
- National Board of Review: Top Ten Films, Second Place, 1981
- 39th Golden Globe Awards, Los Angeles: Nominee, Best Foreign Film, 1982
- 1981 New York Film Critics Circle Awards, New York: Nominee: Best Film, 1981
- 35th British Academy Film Awards, London: Nominee: BAFTA Award for Best Film, 1982
- 54th Academy Awards, Los Angeles: Nominee: Best Picture, 1982
- National Film Preservation Board, National Film Registry Induction, 2003

Quest for Fire (1980)

- 7th César Awards, Paris: Best Film, 1982
- 9th Saturn Awards, Los Angeles, Best International Film, 1982
- 9th Saturn Awards, Los Angeles, Award for Outstanding Film, 1982
- 4th Genie Awards, Toronto: Nominee: Best Motion Picture, 1983
- 40th Golden Globe Awards, Los Angeles: Nominee: Best Foreign Film, 1983

The Plouffe Family (1981)

- Montreal World Film Festival, Montreal: Best Canadian Film, 1981
- 3rd Genie Awards, Toronto: Nominee: Best Motion Picture, 1982

The Bay Boy (1984)

- 6th Genie Awards, Toronto: Best Motion Picture, 1985

The Alley Cat (1985)

- Montreal World Film Festival, Montreal: Jury Prize, 1985
- Montreal World Film Festival, Montreal: Most Popular Film of the Festival, 1985
- 7th Genie Awards, Toronto: Nominee: Best Motion Picture, 1986

The Gate (1987)

- 9th Genie Awards, Toronto: Golden Reel Award, 1988

Murderers Among Us: The Simon Wiesenthal Story (1989)

- CableACE Award: Best Movie or Miniseries, 1990
- 5th TCA Awards, Los Angeles: Nominee: Program of the Year, 1989
- 41st Primetime Emmy Awards, Los Angeles: Nominee: Outstanding Drama or Comedy Special, 1989

The Josephine Baker Story (1991)

- CableACE Award: Nominee: Best Movie or Miniseries, 1992
- 49th Golden Globe Awards, Los Angeles: Nominee: Best Mini-Series or Television Movie, 1992
- 43rd Primetime Emmy Awards, Los Angeles: Nominee: Outstanding Drama/Comedy Special and Miniseries, 1991
