= The Gate (1987 film) =

1987 Canadian film by Tibor Takács

- Theatrical release poster
- Directed by: Tibor Takács
- Written by: Michael Nankin
- Produced by: John Kemeny
- Starring: Stephen Dorff; Louis Tripp; Christa Denton
- Cinematography: Thomas Vámos
- Edited by: Rit Wallis
- Music by: Michael Hoenig; J. Peter Robinson
- Production company: Alliance Entertainment
- Distributed by: New Century Entertainment; Vista Organization
- Release date: May 15, 1987
- Running time: 85 minutes
- Countries: Canada; United States
- Language: English
- Budget: US$6 million
- Box office: US$13.5 million

The Gate is a 1987 supernatural horror film directed by Tibor Takács and starring Stephen Dorff in his film debut. The film follows two young boys who accidentally release a horde of demons from their backyard through a large hole in the ground.

An international co-production between Canada and the United States, the film was released by the New Century Vista Film Company and grossed around twice its budget. Since its release, it has obtained a cult following and was followed by a sequel in 1990 titled The Gate II: Trespassers.

A 3D-remake directed by Alex Winter was in production; it was initially set for a release in 2011, but no release occurred at that time.

== Plot ==
Twelve-year-old Glen has a nightmare of finding his home abandoned, then going into his tree-house only for it to be struck by lightning and collapse. When he wakes, he finds that workers in his backyard have cut down the same tree from his nightmare and unearthed a large geode, which is later discovered by Glen and his older friend, Terry. Glen catches a splinter and leaves a small amount of blood behind.

Glen's parents leave town for three days, leaving his 15-year-old sister, Alexandra ("Al"), in charge. While Al throws a party, Terry and Glen break open the geode after discovering it has left strange writing on a notepad, and read the incantations aloud. They go downstairs just as the party-goers are playing a levitation game. Everyone is shocked when Glen levitates.

Glen sees his bedroom wall stretching, and Terry embraces an apparition of his dead mother that turns out to be Glen's dog Angus, who dies as a result. The next day, Terry brings a heavy metal album to Glen's house with lyrics based on "The Dark Book." He believes that the hole in Glen's backyard is a gateway to a domain of evil gods, and speculates that their actions opened it. He concludes that the only missing element would be to deposit a sacrifice into the hole. Unknown to them, a friend of Al's dumps Angus' body into the hole, completing the summoning. After reading a section from "The Dark Book" that was supposed to close the gateway, the boys find the hole closed and assume they have succeeded.

A swarm of moths shatters Glen's bedroom window, and Angus' corpse is found in Terry's bed. Demonic arms try pulling Al under her bed; Terry and Glen barely save her. They try to flee the house, but are greeted outside by Glen and Al's parents, who are demons in disguise. After returning to the house, Al volunteers to inspect the backyard, but the others see it swarming with small demons and call her back. Terry leads everyone to the basement to retrieve "The Dark Book", but it bursts into flames. They then attempt to stop the creatures by reading the Bible. Terry reads from Psalm 59 and the hole begins to close, but he slips and falls into the hole. Terry is attacked by the small demons before Al and Glen pull him out. Terry reads from Genesis, then throws the Bible into the hole, causing an explosion that appears to seal the hole.

A wall breaks open, and a construction worker's corpse falls through (Terry had previously lied to Glen that when his house was built, one of the workers died and the other workers had sealed him inside a wall). The worker pulls Terry into the wall, which seals behind him. Upstairs, Al notices a hazy image of the construction worker in her mirror before Glen bursts into her bedroom. Al throws a stereo at the construction worker, who then disintegrates into dozens of little demons. Al holds the bedroom door shut while Glen races downstairs to find their father's gun. A demonic version of Terry appears, biting Glen's hand before Al stabs Terry in the eye. Al and Glen hide in a closet, but the construction worker breaks through an interior wall and drags Al away.

Glen realizes that Terry and Al represent the two human sacrifices that would fully open the gate. He also realizes that the rocket he had given to Al for her birthday, a symbol of love, light, and purity, may stop the rise of the Old Gods. He makes his way upstairs as the floor collapses, revealing a chasm beneath the house. Glen attempts to launch the rocket, but his matches keep blowing out. The wind sucks Glen onto the foyer, where a giant serpentine demon emerges. The demon pats Glen on the head and touches his hand before returning to the hole. Glen discovers that the demon's touch has placed an eye in the palm of his hand. He stabs the eye, then struggles to descend the staircase, at which point the demon re-emerges. Glen uses a battery-powered launcher to fire his rocket into the demon, causing it to explode.

Angus emerges from the front closet, seemingly restored to life. He is followed by Terry and Al, also unhurt. Later, the kids worry about how to explain the wreckage of the house to their parents.

== Cast ==
- Stephen Dorff as Glen
- Christa Denton as Alexandra "Al"
- Louis Tripp as Terry Chandler
- Kelly Rowan as Lori Lee
- Jennifer Irwin as Linda Lee
- Deborah Grover as Mom
- Scot Denton as Dad
- Ingrid Veninger as Paula
- Sean Fagan as Eric
- Linda Goranson as Mrs. Chandler
- Carl Kraines as The Workman
- Andrew Gunn as Brad

== Production ==
The first draft of the script was written by Michael Nankin when he was unemployed and recently divorced, basing it on "the nastiest thoughts from [his] childhood". Glen and Al were depicted as being more mischievous than shown in the final film, and the demons spread to the rest of the town, where they would drag neighbors out into the streets to kill them. The gigantic demon was originally envisioned as being made of bloody entrails.

The house was a real home in Toronto, but an exterior exit had to be constructed for the production, featuring bricks, stairs, and a bug zapper. Beyond the backyard was a new housing development, so the crew erected a fence around the yard to block the construction vehicles and workers from view.

The effects used to create the demons included stop-motion animation as well as forced perspective, wherein actors wearing rubber suits were made to look minuscule by their position relative to the camera and to the human characters. Randall William Cook, the film's special effects supervisor, used his hand and eye to create the scene where an eyeball appears in Glen's palm.

== Release ==
The Gate opened in the US on May 15, 1987. It ranked second in its opening weekend and grossed $4.3 million. It grossed a total of $13.5 million by the end of its run. Lionsgate released a special edition DVD on October 6, 2009, with audio commentary from the director and interviews. They later released a Blu-ray version via their label Vestron Video on February 28, 2017. It includes commentary from the filmmakers and several featurettes.

=== Critical response ===
Review aggregation website Rotten Tomatoes reports an approval rating of 42% based on 12 reviews and a rating average of 5.60/10. Michael Wilmington of the Los Angeles Times, in comparing it to the works of Steven Spielberg and Stephen King, wrote, "whatever minor triumphs it dredges up, is too hopelessly copycat". In rating it 3/5 stars, TV Guide called it a "surprisingly effective" and refreshingly uncynical horror film that may be too wimpy for some horror fans. Commenting on the film's dreamlike plot, Time Out said it could have been a cult film had the filmmakers abandoned their attempts to tie together the bizarre elements.

In a retrospective review, Odie Henderson of Slant Magazine wrote, "If you can get in touch with your inner 12-year-old, The Gate is a pleasant diversion." Henderson identifies family values as a core theme, though it is subtle enough not to be preachy. Reviewing the DVD for Dread Central, Paul Nicholasi rated it 4.5/5 stars and called it "a MUST HAVE movie for all horror fans" that they can show their kids to introduce them to horror films.

== Sequels ==
In 1992 a sequel was released entitled The Gate II: Trespassers Louis Tripp reprises his role as Terry, but was the only original cast member to return. It was directed by Tibor Takács and opened in 350 theaters on February 28, 1992, and grossed $2 million. It was released on VHS in 1992 by Columbia Tristar Home Video. In October 2017, Scream Factory released The Gate II on Blu-ray.

In 2009, actor and director Alex Winter was in development of a 3rd film entitled The Gate 3D pitched as a remake. However the project has been stuck in development hell since.

In 2020, Louis Tripp worked with Australian musician KidCrusher on a music and video collaboration entitled Sacrifice, reprising his role as Terry for a tribute to The Gate. On KidCrusher's podcast he mentioned The Gate is the scariest movie he has ever seen and working with Tripp was a blessing.
