= Newmarket Citizens' Band =

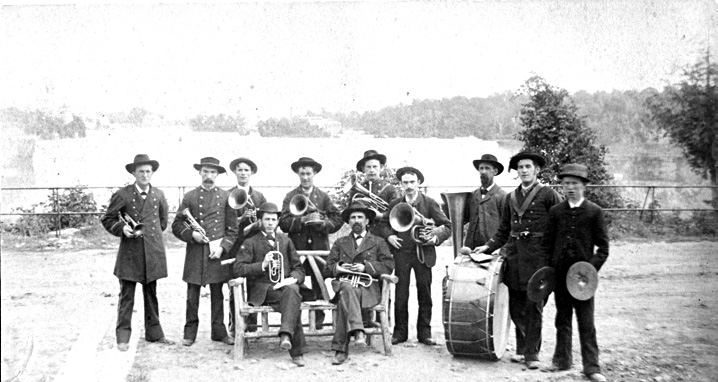
- The members of the band in 1883.

Background information
- Origin: Newmarket, Ontario, Canada
- Genre: Concert band
- Years active: 1872–present
- Website: www.newmarketcitizensband.ca

The Newmarket Citizens' Band is a concert band based in Newmarket, Ontario, Canada. It is Canada's oldest continuously operating community concert band, and one of the country's oldest marching bands. It is a member of the Canadian Band Association, Ontario chapter. Its most recent conductor was Les Saville, who succeeded Bob Thiel in 1990 and retired in 2021.

It was the subject of the 1973 short film Goodbye Sousa produced by Tony Ianzelo, who was raised in the town and attended Newmarket High School. The film won the Canadian Film Award for Theatrical Short. The title is inspired from the music performed by the band, which includes the marches of John Philip Sousa.

== History ==
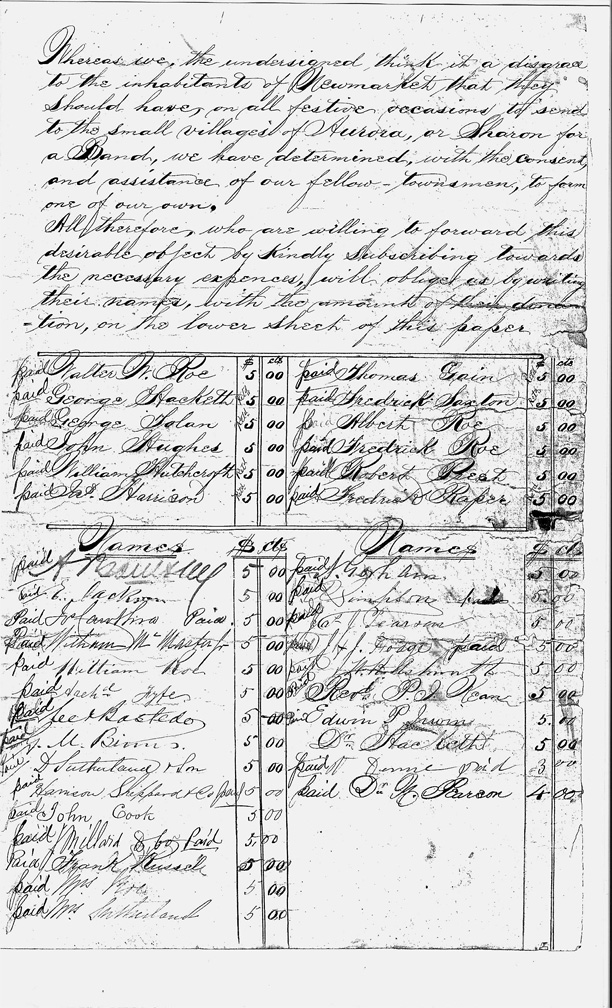
The first page of the petition circulated by the founding members of the Newmarket Citizens' Band

The band was established in 1872 by Walter W. Roe, sixteen years old at the time and son of the town's postmaster and fur trader William Roe. He "circulated a petition appealing for funds" with eleven other youth, including his brothers Albert and Frederick, and friends George Dolan, Thomas Gain, George Hackett, James Harrison, John Hughes, William Hutchcroft, Frederick Raper, Robert Rest, and Frederick Saxton.

Whereas we, the undersigned, think it a disgrace to the inhabitants of Newmarket that they should have, on all festive occasions, to send to the small villages of Aurora and Sharon for a band, we have determined, with the consent and assistance of our fellow-townsmen, to form one of our own.

— Walter Roe, as quoted by Robert Carter, Stories of Newmarket: An Old Ontario Town

Each of the twelve founding members of the band had contributed $5, and the appeal drew subscriptions from 69 other residents, primarily the elderly. In total, they raised $319. Some of the prominent sponsors included John Cawthra and Robert Simpson. The petition was one of the first items added to the town's historical society archive.

On 31 May 1875, Walter and Frederick Roe drowned during a fishing trip on Cook's Bay in Lake Simcoe. The band played at their funeral, which was attended by many residents of the town, and band members wrote a "poem of lamentation" which was published in The Era.

The band wears "scarlet tunics little-changed from those worn" by its early members. The band operated from the Lion's Hall, but a fire to the building in 2005 resulted in the band moving from venue to venue until it establishes a new permanent location for its operation. It currently conducts rehearsals at Ray Twinney Complex. During the COVID-19 pandemic, the band first met virtually, and later some members met at a parking garage in Aurora.

The band's operation is funded by subscriptions from its members and a grant from the town of Newmarket.

== Conductors ==
The band has had numerous conductors in its history.

- Les Saville, 1990–2021
- Bob Thiel, 1982–1990
- William C. Greig, 1962–1982
- Stan Clark, 1960–1962
- Ray Stevens, 1958–1960
- William C. Greig, 1948–1957
- Robert Moore, 1946–1948
- William C. Greig, 1943–1945
- Robert Moore, 1936–1943
- Eddie Woods, 1930–1936
- Orville Ganton, 1926–1930
- Paul Arlitt, 1924–1926
- H. Hawthorn, 1907–1908
- Mr. Robinson, 1906
- Arthur Oliver, 1900
- Tom McDonald, 1895–1925
- James Napier, late 1880s–1924
- Edward Coates, 1887
- Tom McDonald, 1885–1886
- Jack Querrie
- Bert Ratcliffe
- Allie Townley
- Mr. Hilborne, 1884
- Amos Hughes, 1883
- Edward Hunt
- Albert Chantler, 1877
- Col Slatter
- Jack. D. Graham, 1872
- Mr. Bishop, 1850
