= Sandy Webster =

Canadian actor

- Born: Alexander Webster; 30 January 1923; Fort William, Ontario
- Died: 22 March 2017 (aged 94); Toronto, Ontario
- Education: Queen's University at Kingston
- Occupation: Actor
- Years active: 1950-2000
- Organization: Canadian Actors' Equity Association
- Spouse: Ruth Marie Fennel
- Children: 3

Alexander (Sandy) Webster (30 January 1923 - 22 March 2017) was a Canadian actor, perhaps best known for his regular supporting role as forensic investigator Dr. Chisholm in the drama television series The Great Detective.

== Background ==
Born and raised in Fort William, Ontario, he served in the Canadian Air Force during World War II, and subsequently studied at Queen's University. While at Queen's he was involved with campus radio station CFRC-FM, including acting in radio dramas and serving a stint as the station's program director.

== Career ==
He began his career as an actor on stage and in CBC Radio dramas in the 1950s. On one occasion he had to fill in for more established actor Frank Peddie on short notice, but had not had time to prepare or create his own unique characterization in advance — so he simply performed the role as a straight imitation of Peddie's voice and style, and was so convincing that at least one newspaper singled out Peddie's performance for praise.

He was associated most prominently with stage roles, including regular roles at the Shaw Festival since its inception. He notably also originated the role of Wiff Roach in the original Tarragon Theatre production of David French's play Of the Fields, Lately in 1973.

On screen, Webster had roles in theatrical film and television, with frequent performances on CBC Television anthology series such as General Motors Theatre (1955–61), First Performance (1957, 1958), Festival (1961–66), Performance (1975), and For the Record (1976). He portrayed Dr. Baird in the original 1956 teleplay Flight into Danger, as well as playing a doctor in the 1968 film The Best Damn Fiddler from Calabogie to Kaladar.

He portrayed Canadian cabinet minister James Ralston in the 1988 television miniseries The King Chronicle, for which he received a Gemini Award nomination for Best Supporting Actor in a Drama Program or Series at the 3rd Gemini Awards in 1988.

He was also active in the Canadian Actors' Equity Association, serving a stint as president of the organization in the 1980s.

== Personal life and death ==
In 1959 Webster married Ruth Marie Fennel, who died in 2015. They had three children. Webster died in Toronto, Ontario of complications from Alzheimer's disease.

== Filmography ==
Sandy Webster film and television credits
Year	Title	Role	Notes	Ref.
1955	Scope	Unknown	1 episode	
1955–1958	On Camera	(various)	9 episodes	
1955–1958	Folio	(various)	3 episodes	
1955–1961	General Motors Theatre	(various)	14 episodes	
1956	It's the Law	Unknown	1 episode	
1956	The Cage	Unknown	Theatrical short film	
1956	Encounter	Dr. Baird	Episode: Flight into Danger (S4.E17)	
1957–1958	Explorations	Self / Red Keller	3 episodes. Documentary	
1957, 1958	First Performance	Unknown	2 episodes	
1958–1960	The Unforeseen	Unknown		
1959	Lord Elgin: Voice of the People	Major Campbell	Theatrical film	
1960	Just Mary	Unknown		
1960	R.C.M.P.	Dr. Wright	1 episode	
1961	The Conquest of Cobbletown	Television film		
1961–1964	Playdate	(various)	3 episodes	
1961–1966	Festival	(various)	5 episodes	
1962	Scarlett Hill	Unknown	1 episode	
1963–1965	The Forest Rangers	(various)	3 episodes	
1966	Seaway	McSorley	1 episode	
1966	Wojeck	Unknown	1 episode	
1968	The Best Damn Fiddler from Calabogie to Kaladar	Doctor	Theatrical Film	
1974	Dr. Simon Locke	Bartender	1 episode. AKA Police Surgeon	
1974	Running Time	Police Captain	Theatrical film	
1974	The National Dream: Building the Impossible Railway	Marcus Smith	Television mini-series	
1975	Performance	Unknown	1 episode	
1976	For the Record	Unknown	1 episode	
1977	Who Has Seen the Wind	Judge Mortimer	Theatrical Film	
1979	Lost and Found	Dr. Bryce	Theatrical film	
1979	The Littlest Hobo	Mayor	1 episode	
1979	King of Kensington	Andy	1 episode	
1979–1982	The Great Detective	Dr. Archie Chisholm	22 episodes	
1980	Nothing Personal	Marshal #1	Theatrical film	
1982, 1983	Hangin' In	Ted	2 episodes	
1987	Blue Monkey	Fred Adams	Theatrical film	
1988	The King Chronicle	James Ralston	Television mini-series. Part 3: "Mackenzie King and the Zombie Army"	
1989	Street Legal	Richard Duguay	1 episode	
1989	C.B.C.'s Magic Hour	Announcer	Episode: "The Rookies" (TV movie)	
1990	War of the Worlds	Gunther	1 episode	
1990	Maniac Mansion	Mr. Dodsworth	1 episode	
1991	Katts and Dog	Unknown	1 episode	
1995	A Holiday to Remember	Mr. Dave	Television film	
1996	Due South	Murray	1 episode	
1999–2000	Wind at My Back	Harmon Drakeford	3 episodes	
