= High Grass Circus =

1976 film by Tony Ianzelo

- Directed by: Tony Ianzelo; Torben Schioler
- Produced by: William Brind; Tony Ianzelo; Colin Low (exec.)
- Cinematography: Tony Ianzelo
- Edited by: Torben Schioler; Donald Douglas (sound)
- Music by: Donald Douglas
- Production company: National Film Board of Canada
- Release date: 1976
- Running time: 57 minutes
- Country: Canada
- Language: English
- Budget: $62,008

High Grass Circus is a 1976 National Film Board of Canada documentary film co-directed by Tony Ianzelo and Torben Schioler, exploring life in the Royal Brothers' traveling circus. It was shot in the spring and summer of 1975 and part of 1976, and had a budget of $62,008 (equivalent to $327,386 in 2025).

It received the Golden Sheaf Award for Best Film of the Festival at the Yorkton Film Festival, the Award of Excellence from the Film Advisory Board, and it was nominated as Best Documentary Feature at the 50th Academy Awards.

Following its Oscar nomination, it was acquired by CBC-TV, which broadcast it on July 12, 1978. It was subsequently sold to television networks in New Zealand, the UK, South Africa and Yugoslavia. A nine-minute cut-down version of the film, entitled Little Big Top, played in Canadian theatres in late 1977, including a 15-week run in Vancouver. In August 1980, PBS acquired the film along with seven other NFB documentaries and broadcast them on 11 of its stations.

== Works cited ==
- Evans, Gary (1991). In the National Interest: A Chronicle of the National Film Board of Canada from 1949 to 1989. University of Toronto Press. ISBN 0802027849.
