= U-Turn (1973 film) =

1973 film

- Directed by: George Kaczender
- Written by: George Kaczender; Douglas Bowie
- Produced by: George Kaczender
- Starring: David Selby; Maud Adams
- Cinematography: Miklós Lente
- Edited by: George Kaczender
- Distributed by: Cinerama Releasing Corporation
- Release date: 15 August 1973
- Running time: 99 minutes
- Country: Canada
- Language: English

U-Turn, also known as The Girl in Blue, is a 1973 Canadian drama film directed by George Kaczender and starring David Selby and Maud Adams. It was entered into the 23rd Berlin International Film Festival.

== Cast ==
- David Selby as Scott Laithem
- Maud Adams as Paula / Tracy
- Gay Rowan as Bonnie
- William Osler as Professor Bamberger
- Diane Dewey as Holly
- Michael Kirby as Kippie
- Walter Wakefield as Old man
- Don Arioli as Sidewalk artist
- Valda Dalton as Bingo woman
- Guy Martin as Policeman
- Michel Maillot as Good Humour man
- Hanka Posnanska as Flower woman
- George R. Robertson as Tennis pro
- Elsa Pickthorne as Georgette
- Donald Ewer as Les Turnbull
