= Réo Grégoire =

Canadian cinematographer

Réo Grégoire was a Canadian cinematographer. He was most noted for his work on Pierre Bernier and Jacques Leduc's short documentary film No Matter Where (Là ou ailleurs), for which he won the Canadian Film Award for Best Colour Cinematography at the 21st Canadian Film Awards in 1969.

Grégoire worked principally on documentary films for the National Film Board of Canada, although he also had selected credits on narrative fiction films including A Matter of Life (Question de vie), O or the Invisible Infant (Ô ou l'invisible enfant) and The Paths of the World (Les Allées de la terre).
