= Stop (1971 film) =

1971 Canadian drama film

- Directed by: Jean Beaudin
- Written by: Clément Perron; Minou Petrowski
- Produced by: Pierre Gauvreau
- Starring: Raymond Bouchard; Danielle Naud; Marie Tifo
- Cinematography: Georges Dufaux
- Edited by: Sidney Pearson
- Music by: Pierre F. Brault
- Production company: National Film Board of Canada
- Release date: August 6, 1971
- Running time: 85 minutes
- Country: Canada
- Language: French

Stop is a Canadian drama film, directed by Jean Beaudin and released in 1971. The film stars Raymond Bouchard as Charles Hébert, a professional race car driver whose obsession with competition is causing problems in his marriage to Françoise (Danielle Naud), leading him to commence an extramarital affair with Diane (Marie Tifo).

The film, Beaudin's full-length directorial debut, was shot in 1970 for the National Film Board of Canada. The screenplay was written by Clément Perron and Minou Petrowski.
