= Blackwood (1976 film) =

1976 film by Tony Ianzelo

- Directed by: Tony Ianzelo; Andy Thomson
- Written by: Barry Cowling
- Produced by: Tom Daly; Colin Low
- Narrated by: Gordon Pinsent
- Cinematography: Tony Ianzelo; Richard Moras (animation); Raymond Dumas (animation)
- Edited by: Les Halman
- Music by: Ben Low
- Distributed by: National Film Board of Canada
- Release date: 1976
- Running time: 28 minutes
- Country: Canada
- Languages: English, French

Blackwood is a 1976 Canadian short documentary film about Newfoundland artist David Blackwood, directed by Tony Ianzelo and Andy Thomson for the National Film Board of Canada.

== Summary ==
The film studies the works of Newfoundland’s David Blackwood (1941-2022), one of Canada’s greatest intaglio printmakers. Blackwood guides viewers through the process of etching, with step-by-step explanations. We see historical images of his home town of Wesleyville, and hear the tales of a seasoned seaman.

Much of Blackwood’s work depicted Newfoundland outport life and industry, and we see some of his images of shipwrecks, seal hunting and iceberg encounters. Newfoundland native Gordon Pinsent is the narrator, and the cinematography has fine threads weaving, mingling, separating and disappearing, evoking a sense of history and a way of life long gone.

== Awards ==
- Festival International du Film sur l'Art, Paris - Grand Prize for the Quality of the Image, 1977
- Festival of Tourist and Folklore Films, Brussels - Prize of the Principality of Monaco for the Best Film Evocating the Past of a Region by the Means of Art, 1977
- Yorkton Film Festival, Yorkton, Saskatchewan: Golden Sheaf Award, Best Short Film, 1977
- Yorkton Film Festival, Yorkton, Saskatchewan: Golden Sheaf Award, Best Sound Editing (to John Knight), 1977
- 49th Academy Awards, Los Angeles – Nominee, Best Documentary Short Subject
