= The Gate II: Trespassers =

1990 film by Tibor Takács

- Theatrical release poster
- Directed by: Tibor Takács
- Written by: Michael Nankin
- Produced by: John Kemeny; Andras Hamori
- Starring: Louis Tripp; Pamela Segall
- Cinematography: Bryan England
- Edited by: Ronald Sanders
- Music by: George Blondheim
- Production company: Alliance Entertainment
- Distributed by: Vision p.d.g. (US)
- Release date: February 28, 1992
- Running time: 93 minutes
- Countries: Canada; United States
- Language: English
- Budget: $7 million CAD
- Box office: $2 million (US)

The Gate II: Trespassers (also known as Gate II: Return to the Nightmare) is a 1990 horror film and a sequel to the 1987 film The Gate. It was directed by Tibor Takács and was a co-production between the United States and Canada. Louis Tripp reprises his role as Terrence "Terry" Chandler, a teenager who opens a gate to Hell.

== Plot ==
It has been five years since Terry (now known as Terrence) and his friend, Glen, accidentally opened up the Gate in Glen's back yard, releasing demonic forces that the two of them had to banish. Glen and his family have moved away, and Terrence's broken family has grown worse. Still grieving over his mother's death, and with his dad wallowing in alcoholism, Terrence finds himself increasingly drawn to the evil portal and the power it possesses.

Terrence breaks into Glen's old house and begins the ritual to summon the demons and grant him the power to get his father's life back on track. He is interrupted by three other teens who also broke into the house. While John and Moe are content to ridicule Terrence, John's girlfriend, Liz is extremely interested in demonology and convinces her two friends to join Terrence in completing the ritual. Terrence summons a Minion (one of the small creatures that ran amok previously) through the Gate. In a panic, John pulls out his revolver and shoots it, then storms off with his friends in tow. Alone, Terrence retrieves the Minion's body and takes it home. It survives, so Terrance opts to keep it in a cage as a pet.

The next day, Terrence finds that his wish has seemingly come true. His father, once a proud airline pilot, has given up the bottle and netted a job flying for a major carrier. When Liz comes over later, they discover they can use the Minion to grant any wish they want, but with dire consequences.

Liz burns an effigy of her car pin to make a real one. John and Moe create money and binge at an expensive restaurant after stealing the minion and trashing Terrence's house. The minion gets loose and attacks the boys, infecting them both.

John and Moe transform into demons. They kidnap Liz to sacrifice her. Previously Liz and Terrence imbued an old jewelry box belonging to his mother as a vessel of light to destroy the darkness.

Terrence is brought to the dark world by the demonic John and Moe and transformed into a demon. He is tasked with sacrificing Liz to the Darkness. Terrence fights to save Liz and hurls the box into the gate. It explodes with light and they are transported back to Earth. Terrence dies.

After the funeral, Terrence emerges from the coffin and kisses Liz. After they leave, John and Moe also emerge from the coffin. Seeing Liz and Terry together, they state, "Who needs chicks when you got demons!" In a post-credits scene, Terrence's hamster, previously sacrificed by John to open the portal, has also been restored to life and exits the coffin.

== Cast ==
- Louis Tripp as Terry
- Simon Reynolds as Moe
- James Villemaire as John
- Pamela Segall as Liz
- Neil Munro as Art
- James Kidnie as Mr. Coleson
- Elva Mai Hoover as Doctor
- Gerry Mendicino as Maitre d'
- Andrea Ladányi as Minion

== Production ==
Following the success of The Gate which saw it become the highest-grossing Canadian film of 1987, producers John Kemeny and Andras Hamori set up a sequel at Alliance Entertainment. Director Tibor Takács, screenwriter Michael Nankin, and special effects supervisor Randall William Cook were all brought back for the sequel after having worked on the first film. Unlike the previous film that featured hordes of demons, The Gate II only featured one as Takács and Cook wanted to give the demon a sense of character portraying him as a cunning trickster who can gain people's confidence and use that against them rather than the interchangeable demons who acted like swarms of rats or had a mob mentality in the first film. Unlike the first film which used stop motion to bring the demons to life, the demon in The Gate II is portrayed by ballerina wearing a 60-to-70-pound (27 to 32 kg) foam rubber suit in combination with three interchangeable effects heads designed by Cook that allowed for a wider range of expressions through radio and cable control.

== Release ==
The Gate II opened in 350 theaters in the US on February 28, 1992, and grossed $2 million.

The film was released on VHS in the US later in 1992 by Columbia Tristar Home Video and on LaserDisc in PAL regions that same year. In October 2017, Scream Factory announced their intention to release The Gate II on Blu-ray on February 20, 2018.

== Reception ==
Kevin Thomas of the Los Angeles Times wrote that the film "doesn't generate as much fun and excitement as the original", but it is likely to be enjoyed by fans of The Gate. TV Guide rated it 2/4 stars and called it "an extended, updated riff" on traditional fairy tales about the dangers of wish fulfillment.
