= Memorandum (film) =

- Directed by: Donald Brittain; John Spotton
- Written by: Donald Brittain
- Produced by: John Kemeny
- Starring: Bernard Laufer; Emil Bednarek; Wilhelm Boger; Arthur Breitwieser
- Cinematography: John Spotton
- Edited by: John Spotton
- Production company: National Film Board of Canada
- Release date: 1965
- Running time: 58 minutes
- Country: Canada
- Language: English

Memorandum is a one-hour 1965 documentary co-directed by Donald Brittain and John Spotton, and produced by John Kemeny for the National Film Board of Canada. It follows Bernard Laufer, a Jewish Holocaust survivor, on an emotional pilgrimage back to the Bergen-Belsen concentration camp. Considered by many critics to be Brittain's finest work, the film's title refers to Hitler's memorandum about the "final solution."

A detailed analysis of the film's structure is available in Ken Dancyger's The Technique of Film and Video Editing: History, Theory and Practice.

== Awards ==
- Venice Film Festival, Venice: First Prize, Lion of St. Mark, 1966
- Golden Gate International Film Festival, San Francisco: First Prize, Essay, 1966
- Vancouver International Film Festival, Vancouver: Certificate of Merit, Television Films, 1966
- Montreal International Film Festival, Montreal: Special Mention, Medium-Length Films, 1966
