= Michael Posner (journalist) =

Canadian journalist (born 1947)

Michael Posner (born 1947) is a Canadian journalist, best known as the author of the Mordecai Richler biography The Last Honest Man, the Anne Murray biography All of Me, and The Art of Medicine: Healing and the Limits of Technology with the physician Herbert Ho Ping Kong.

Posner is also the author of a three-volume oral biography of Leonard Cohen published by Simon and Schuster in 2020, 2021 and 2022 respectively.

In his youth, he appeared as an actor in the film And No Birds Sing, for which he won the Canadian Film Award for Best Supporting Actor in a Non-Feature at the 21st Canadian Film Awards in 1969. He did not continue to work as an actor, instead becoming a journalist.

In 1977, he co-founded Canadian Lawyer Magazine, and went on to write for publications such as the Financial Times of Canada, The Globe and Mail and Toronto Life.

His books and long form journalistic works have included The Big Picture: What Canadians Think About Almost Everything (1990), cowritten with Allan Gregg; Canadian Dreams: The Making and Marketing of Independent Films (1993); and Triple Bypass (2016), about his 2013 battle with heart disease.
