= Goodbye Sousa =

1973 film by Tony Ianzelo

- Directed by: Tony Ianzelo
- Produced by: George Pearson
- Cinematography: Bob Charlie; Tony Ianzelo; Andreas Poulsson; Tony Westman
- Edited by: Torben Schioler
- Music by: John Philip Sousa
- Production company: National Film Board of Canada
- Release date: 1973
- Running time: 17 minutes
- Country: Canada
- Language: English

Goodbye Sousa is a Canadian short documentary film, directed by Tony Ianzelo and released in 1973. It profiles the Newmarket Citizens' Band, one of Canada's oldest active marching bands.

The film won the Canadian Film Award for Best Theatrical Short Film at the 25th Canadian Film Awards in 1971.
