= Along These Lines (film) =

1974 Canadian film

- Directed by: Peter Pearson
- Produced by: Patrick Watson
- Production company: Immedia
- Distributed by: Bell Canada
- Release date: 1974
- Running time: 16 minutes
- Country: Canada
- Language: English

Along These Lines is a 1974 Canadian short documentary film directed by Peter Pearson. A history of the telephone, the film was sponsored by Bell Canada to mark the 100th anniversary of the telephone's invention by Alexander Graham Bell in 1874. It was produced by Patrick Watson and animated by George Dunning.

It won the Canadian Film Award for Best Theatrical Short Film at the 26th Canadian Film Awards.
