= Chasm (disambiguation) =

A rift is a linear zone where the lithosphere is being pulled apart.

Chasm or The Chasm may also refer to:

== Arts, entertainment, and media ==
=== Games ===
- Chasm (video game), a 2018 video game released by Bit Kid, Inc.
- Chasm: The Rift, a 1997 computer game released by GT Interactive

=== Music ===
- Chasm (Delta-S album), 2005
- Chasm (Ryuichi Sakamoto album), 2004
- Chasm (The Awakening album), 2018
- "Chasm" (song), a 2010 song by Flyleaf
- The Chasm (band), a death metal band originally from Mexico City, Mexico

=== Other uses in arts, entertainment, and media ===
- The Chasm (novel), a 1947 novel by Victor Canning
- Chasm City, a 2001 science fiction novel
- "The Chasm" (Sliders), a television episode

== Places ==
- Chasm, British Columbia
- Chasm Provincial Park, adjacent to Chasm, British Columbia
- The Chasm, a feature of Sandymount, Otago Peninsula, New Zealand

== Economics ==
- Chasm, gap in technology adoption, see Technology adoption life cycle #Adaptations of the model and Crossing the Chasm

== Other uses ==
- Abyss (religion)
- Canyon or gorge
- Chaos (cosmogony)
