= Don't Knock the Ox =

1970 film by Tony Ianzelo

- Directed by: Tony Ianzelo
- Produced by: William Canning
- Cinematography: Tony Ianzelo
- Edited by: Torben Schioler
- Music by: Donald Douglas
- Production company: National Film Board of Canada
- Release date: 1970
- Running time: 13 minutes
- Country: Canada
- Language: English

Don't Knock the Ox is a 1970 short documentary film, directed by Tony Ianzelo National Film Board of Canada.

The International Ox Pull, highlight of the Bridgewater, Nova Scotia annual fair, is a hold-over from the pioneer past when oxen cleared the land and tilled the soil. These beasts of burden have lost none of their pulling power, as demonstrated when they drag tons of weight loaded on sleds, with the winner pulling up to six tons.

The film won the Canadian Film Award for Best Theatrical Short Film at the 23rd Canadian Film Awards in 1971.
