= Blue Monkey (film) =

- Directed by: William Fruet
- Written by: George Goldsmith; Chris Kosulek (uncredited)
- Produced by: Martin Walters executive Sandy Howard
- Starring: Steve Railsback; Gwynyth Walsh; Don Lake; Sandy Webster; Helen Slayton-Hughes
- Cinematography: Brenton Spencer
- Edited by: Michael Fruet
- Music by: Patrick Coleman; Paul Novotny
- Distributed by: International Spectrafilm
- Release date: 25 September 1987 (United States)
- Running time: 96 minutes
- Country: Canada
- Language: English
- Budget: $3 million Canadian

Blue Monkey is a 1987 Canadian horror film directed by William Fruet and starring Steve Railsback, Gwynyth Walsh, Susan Anspach, Don Lake, Sandy Webster, Helen Slayton-Hughes, and John Vernon. The film centers on a group of doctors trapped in a quarantined hospital as a giant insect-like creature begins to spread a deadly infection. The film was released on VHS by March 31, 1988. It received mostly negative reviews upon its release. It was released in some foreign markets as "Insect".

== Plot ==
Marwellia Harbison is an eccentric old woman who owns a greenhouse. Handyman Fred Adams stops by to do some work on the light fixtures and comments on how one of her plants is drooping. It is an odd-looking plant with yellow flowers. According to Marwella, it came from a newly formed volcanic island off the coast of Micronesia. Its current state happened overnight, and Marwella is at a loss to explain what could have caused it.

Fred inexplicably hurts himself on the plant as though he pricked his finger on a thorn. However, Marwella claims the plant has no thorns, and neither she nor Fred can figure out what could have pricked him. Nevertheless, he seems okay, and after bidding Marwella goodbye, he walks out to his truck, after which he immediately starts feeling strange and collapses. Marwella calls the paramedics. Fred is taken by ambulance to the Hill Valley Hospital with a very high fever. On call are Doctors Rachel Carson and Judith Glass, who are astonished to see that the man has already developed gangrene where he pricked his finger. Their attention is taken away from Fred when police detective Jim Bishop brings his partner in with a bad gunshot wound. The two had been involved in a stakeout that went poorly, and Jim's partner got shot at point-blank range. However, Rachel is confident that he should be okay with surgery.

In the adjacent bed, Fred begins convulsing and winds up vomiting an insect pupa out of his mouth, after which he seems to stabilize. The pupa is hurriedly contained in a bell jar in the hospital's in-house laboratory. Rachel is concerned that whatever Fred had might be contagious and orders mandatory checkups of everyone, including Jim. When Jim comes back clean of any mysterious parasitic insects, Rachel decides to show him around the hospital, including their high-tech research facility, where they are testing out new and powerful surgical lasers. Attempts to x-ray the pupa prove futile, so it is decided to slice it open. In doing so, the doctors unleash a particularly feisty insect-like creature, but with Jim's help, they get it contained.

Meanwhile, Fred is faring worse. In addition to having parasites from the insect, he has come down with a mysterious disease the creature was carrying. He goes into cardiac arrest, and when Judith Glass attempts to revive him with shock paddles, his chest violently explodes. Meanwhile, Marwella and the paramedic who brought Fred in come down with the same symptoms.

Hospital director Roger Levering is resistant to quarantining the facility for fear of causing a panic, but Rachel is at least able to get him to bring in entomologist Elliot Jacobs in the hopes of identifying the mysterious insect. Before Elliot arrives, a group of children from the hospital's pediatric ward start roaming the halls. Lab technician Alice Bradley, tasked with guarding the insect specimen, is lured away from her post by her boyfriend, laser lab technician Ted Andrews, to have sex, which leaves the insect completely unguarded. The children wander on into the lab unnoticed. Seeing the insect, they decide to feed it some bluish powdery substance one of them finds in a bottle on a shelf. They argue over who gets to pour it into the jar with the insect, and as a result, they pour in an excessively large amount of the powder. Hearing the nurse and orderly returning, the children quickly leave. Unbeknownst to the two, the insect has grown to gigantic proportions and broken free of its glass prison. It promptly kills them both.

Elliot Jacobs arrives, and he, Rachel, and Jim survey the carnage. Elliot is horrified when he discovers that the bluish powder the children fed the insect was a growth hormone. Now the insect is giant, and it could be anywhere. It turns out the insect is in the utility tunnels underneath the hospital, where the creature kills a hapless janitor and then begins building a nest for its brood. Rachel, Jim, and Elliot figure out how to stop the insect while Judith deals with the consequences of the disease the creature has spread throughout the building before the military, summoned by New York's Lincoln Institute (a facility for disease prevention), take drastic measures and destroy the facility.

== Cast ==
- Steve Railsback as Detective Jim Bishop: A police officer who brings his partner to the hospital with a gunshot wound but quickly finds himself helping Dr. Carson hunt down the creature.
- Gwynyth Walsh as Dr. Rachel Carson: An emergency room doctor who finds herself hunting down the film's creature along with Detective Bishop.
- Susan Anspach as Dr. Judith Glass: The other doctor on call at the time of the outbreak, Dr. Glass rushes to stop the spreading infection started by the creature.
- Don Lake as Dr. Elliot Jacobs: An entomologist summoned to the hospital in order to analyze the insect-like creature before its growth.
- Sandy Webster as Fred Adams: An aging handyman who becomes "patient zero" for both the infection and the creature of the film.
- Helen Hughes as Marwella Harbison: An elderly woman who unwittingly starts the infection after ordering a new species of plant for her greenhouse.
- John Vernon as Roger Levering: Greedy, corporate Hospital Director.

== Production ==
It was part of a three-picture deal between Sandy Howard and RCA-Columbia. The other films were Dark Tower and Nightstick. The movie received a 30% tax benefit because it was shot in Canada (in Toronto) with Canadian talent. The original title was Green Monkey but it was changed because of a theory at the time that AIDS was started by infected African green monkeys. The story was an idea of Sandy Howard's and was inspired by the success of Aliens (1986).

== Release ==
=== Home media ===
Blue Monkey was released on VHS by Sony Pictures Home Entertainment on March 31, 1988.

== Reception ==
In her 1987 review, Janet Maslin from The New York Times wrote, "BLUE MONKEY isn't much more than a standard angry-larva story, but it has been cleverly directed by William Fruet, who knows how to give it a new look. To be sure, what happens in the film is essentially familiar, as a slimy little abomination appears, grows, hatches and goes on to terrorize everyone it meets. From the standpoint of plot, there isn't that much to tell." Author and film critic Leonard Maltin awarded the film a BOMB, his lowest rating, calling it "silly", and "poorly filmed".

HorrorNews.net gave the film a positive review, commending the film's acting, special effects, and direction. Joshua Millican from HorrorFreakNews.com placed the film on his list of "7 Underappreciated Horror Movies You Can ONLY Find On VHS".
