= Vertige (1969 film) =

- Directed by: Jean Beaudin
- Produced by: Gilles Boivin; Clément Perron
- Cinematography: Jean-Claude Labrecque
- Edited by: Éric de Bayser
- Music by: Serge Garant
- Production company: National Film Board of Canada
- Release date: 1969
- Running time: 44 minutes
- Country: Canada
- Language: French

Vertige is a Canadian film, directed by Jean Beaudin and released in 1969. An examination of youth culture in the era, the film uses psychedelic techniques to depict young people hedonistically seeking escape in sexual activity and drug use.

The film won the Canadian Film Award for Best Film Over 30 Minutes at the 21st Canadian Film Awards in 1969, and Serge Garant received a special award for the film's score.
