= The Great Detective =

Canadian television drama series

- Genre: Mystery; Period drama
- Starring: Douglas Campbell; James Dugan; Sandy Webster
- Country of origin: Canada
- No. of seasons: 4
- No. of episodes: 35

Production
- Running time: 60 minutes

Original release
- Network: CBC Television
- Release: January 17, 1979 – March 4, 1982

The Great Detective is a Canadian television drama that aired on CBC from 1979 to 1982. It starred Douglas Campbell and James Dugan.

== Background ==
The Great Detective was inspired by the exploits of John Wilson Murray, Canada's first government-appointed detective, set in the latter part of the Victorian era. The leading character, Inspector Alistair Cameron, was a fictional counterpart of Murray. Inspector Cameron was ably assisted by his friend, forensic scientist Dr. Chisholm (Sandy Webster).

A taped series, The Great Detective was produced on location at Rockwood, Kleinburg and Shadow Lake in Ontario, as well as Victoria, areas of downtown Toronto and CBC's television Studio 7.

== Cast ==
- Douglas Campbell as Inspector Alistair Cameron
- Sandy Webster as Dr. Archie Chisholm
- Kay Hawtrey as Mrs. Lutz
- Tracy Brett as Prudence Weatherall
- James Duggan as Sergeant Striker

== Episodes ==
=== Season 1 (1979) ===
No. overall	No. in season	Title	Directed by	Written by	Original release date
1	1	"The Case of the Magic Mandarin"	Unknown	Unknown	January 17, 1979
2	2	"The Black Curse"	Unknown	Unknown	January 24, 1979
3	3	"Death Takes a Curtain Call"	Unknown	Unknown	January 31, 1979
4	4	"Murder at Blenheim Swamp"	Unknown	Unknown	February 7, 1979
5	5	"Bloodhounds Can't Fly"	Moira Armstrong	Frank McEnaney	February 14, 1979
6	6	"Nightwalker of the Wards"	Jack Nixon-Browne	John C.W. Saxton	February 21, 1979
7	7	"Pretty Mary Mitchell"	Unknown	Unknown	February 28, 1979
8	8	"The Curious Death of a Maiden Lady"	Unknown	Unknown	March 7, 1979
9	9	"The Song of the Hemp"	Harvey Frost	J. Ancevich	March 14, 1979
10	10	"Fire at Fenroy"	Unknown	Unknown	March 21, 1979

=== Season 2 (1980) ===
No. overall	No. in season	Title	Directed by	Written by	Original release date
11	1	"Train of Events"	Unknown	Unknown	January 2, 1980
12	2	"The Eye of Clarkie Blackburn"	Harvey Frost	William Davidson	January 9, 1980
13	3	"A Family Business"	Unknown	Unknown	January 16, 1980
14	4	"Murder in Sepia"	Barry Cranstoun	R.B. Carney	January 23, 1980
15	5	"A Watery Grave"	Unknown	Unknown	January 30, 1980
16	6	"Spirit Guide"	Unknown	Unknown	February 6, 1980
17	7	"The Man Who Died Twice"	Bill Hays	Gordon Ruttan	February 13, 1980
18	8	"Too Many Cooks"	Unknown	Unknown	February 20, 1980

=== Season 3 (1981) ===
No. overall	No. in season	Title	Directed by	Written by	Original release date
19	1	"A Question of Loyalties"	F. Harvey Frost	Peter Wildeblood	January 13, 1981
20	2	"Death Visit"	Jack Nixon-Browne	Bryan Wade	January 20, 1981
21	3	"Sins of the Fathers"	Barry Cranstoun	Bryan Barney	January 27, 1981
22	4	"Scull-Duggery"	F. Harvey Frost	R.B. Carney	February 3, 1981
23	5	"Murder by Proxy: Part 1"	Barry Cranstoun	Gordon Ruttan	February 10, 1981
24	6	"Murder by Proxy: Part 2"	F. Harvey Frost	Gordon Ruttan	February 17, 1981
25	7	"Horror in the Wax Museum"	F. Harvey Frost	R.B. Carney	February 24, 1981
26	8	"Murder in Motion"	Unknown	Unknown	March 3, 1981
27	9	"If Looks Could Kill"	F. Harvey Frost	Peter Wildeblood	March 10, 1981

=== Season 4 ===
No. overall	No. in season	Title	Directed by	Written by	Original release date
28	1	"Death Circuit"	Unknown	Unknown	January 14, 1982
29	2	"Damned Indenture"	Unknown	Unknown	January 21, 1982
30	3	"Bodies in the Belfry"	TBA	TBA	TBA
31	4	"Star of Bengal"	TBA	TBA	TBA
32	5	"Death on Delivery"	TBA	TBA	TBA
33	6	"Death and Dishonour"	TBA	TBA	TBA
34	7	"Eeny Meenie Murder"	TBA	TBA	TBA
35	8	"Circus"	TBA	TBA	TBA
