= White Line Fever (film) =

1975 film by Jonathan Kaplan

- Theatrical release poster
- Directed by: Jonathan Kaplan
- Written by: Jonathan Kaplan; Ken Friedman
- Produced by: John Kemeny
- Starring: Jan-Michael Vincent; Kay Lenz; Sam Laws; Slim Pickens; L. Q. Jones; Don Porter; R. G. Armstrong; Leigh French; Dick Miller; Martin Kove
- Cinematography: Fred Koenekamp
- Edited by: O. Nicholas Brown
- Music by: David Nichtern
- Production companies: International Cinemedia Center; White Line Fever Syndicate
- Distributed by: Columbia Pictures
- Release dates: July 16, 1975 (United States); August 1, 1975 (Canada)
- Running time: 90 minutes
- Countries: Canada; United States
- Language: English
- Budget: C$1,400,000
- Box office: $35 million

White Line Fever is a 1975 Canadian-American action crime neo-noir film directed by Jonathan Kaplan and starring Jan-Michael Vincent.

== Plot ==
Sam Hummer is a local truck driver from Tucson, Arizona who works for a Tucson-based produce-shipper called "Red River". His driving partners are Duane Haller and "Pops" Dinwiddie. Eventually Sam's son, Carrol Jo (hereafter known as "CJ"), is old enough to ride with his father and the two of them then become partners as well. Sam changes the lettering on the trailer of his rig to read "Sam Hummer and Son".

CJ begins dating Jerri and the two want to get married, but Sam dies and the trucking partnership suddenly ends. As a result, CJ joins the Air Force and is soon sent to Vietnam. CJ performs well in Vietnam and is deemed a hero, but all he wants to do is return home to Jerri. Jerri spends her time waiting for his return, which is the subject of the film's theme song "Drifting and Dreaming" by Valerie Carter. The opening sequence shows CJ's plane arriving from overseas as Jerri and her brother give him a hero's welcome. We see the two get married and start their life together in humble settings.

CJ obtains a loan from the bank to purchase a truck. He and Jerri visit a local used truck sales lot where he purchases a repossessed 1974 Ford WT9000 cabover rig with a 350 NTC Cummins turbo diesel engine. The salesman throws in a custom paint job to seal the deal and CJ picks a blue and white paint scheme, highlighted with the words "BLUE MULE". Later, the two are jubilant as they drive their new truck through the deserts around Tucson, imagining the new life that awaits them.

CJ announces to the local listeners on the CB radio that he is in business for himself and is intent on getting as much as he can, so that he can get out of hock to the bank as quickly as possible.

When CJ goes back to work at Red River he finds out that things are very different. He sees unfriendly and unfamiliar faces now working there. Duane Haller informs him that the company is now hauling un-taxed cigarettes, slot machines and other contraband. Duane further states that if he wants to stay out of trouble and keep working, he'll have to keep his mouth shut. CJ gets angry and forces his rig to be unloaded, vowing never to haul illegal cargo, but not after having an altercation with Clem, the ringleader of the corrupt goons working the docks.

Later in the day, Carrol Jo is pulled over on a lonely highway and discovers that Deputy "Bob", the local sheriff is in on the crooked dealing as well. He handcuffs CJ to his truck and then speeds off. Clem, along with two other goons from Red River then show up and break his ribs.

After CJ recuperates enough from his injuries, he tries to find work at other trucking companies around Tucson. He discovers that Red River has blackballed him as a troublemaker, and he is unwelcome everywhere he goes. Livid, he returns to Red River with a shotgun and threatens Duane Haller. Duane informs him that he is just a pawn in the game and that the person he actually needs to talk to is Duane's boss, Buck Wessler (L.Q. Jones). Buck is a sleazy, lower-level crook who now manages Red River. Buck agrees to let CJ take a load to Dallas, free of any contraband. Sam Hummer's old friend “Pops” Dinwiddie decides to come along, to help keep CJ safe on his trip. En route, they are attacked by men from Red River, but manage to fight them off and continue on their way.

Throughout the rest of the story, CJ tries to make a living by driving daily loads in and out of Tucson, mainly for Red River. He slowly discovers that Red River is actually owned by a large corporation based in Phoenix called the “Glass House”, a diversified energy and transportation company. Unbeknownst to him, though, Glass House is actually a front for organized crime. They use the trucking companies that they own as a transportation system for their syndicate and its illegal shipments.

Over the course of several months, CJ tries to organize the other drivers at Red River and around Tucson to stand up to the Glass House and refuse to haul illegal cargo. In the process he is beaten, vandalized, cheated and then eventually framed for Duane Haller's murder. After his acquittal, CJ discovers the murdered body of Pops Dinwiddie, who had been driving the Blue Mule while CJ was in jail, in his house. This leads to a climactic confrontation with all of the Red River drivers against Buck and his goons at the loading dock. CJ beats Buck senseless, until CJ's brother-in-law stops Carnell (Pop's son), also wanting to attack Buck, avenging his father's death.

A few days later, Carrol Jo, Carnell and with all the other Red River Drivers are invited to the Glass House for a meeting with the senior management. They are propositioned job opportunities with similar business arrangements that the GH had with Buck and his associates. Not trusting the Glass House nor their shady business practices, Carrol Jo declines their offers electing to continue operating on his own and encourages the other drivers to do likewise.

That night, CJ and Jerri are viciously attacked by a masked thug during their sleep and their house is set on fire. CJ wakes up and gets both of them out of the house before it partially burns down. Later on at the hospital, the doctor informs him that Jerri has lost the baby she was carrying and will never be able to have children. CJ returns home in despair.

Moments later, he emerges from the house with a shotgun and gets into the Blue Mule. He radios Deputy “Bob” that he is headed for the Glass House and to tell them that he is coming. Bob tries to intercept him on a two-lane road, but CJ runs the deputy off the road, destroying his patrol car. CJ shows up at the Glass House headquarters, faced by several heavily armed security guards who are waiting for him. He accelerates as fast as he can toward them, but his truck is riddled with bullets, blowing out several tires, the radiator and the windshield. CJ takes one bullet to the face. He manages to run through the security gauntlet, but he knows he won't be able to get the crippled truck all the way to the corporate headquarters, so he aims for the giant sign that stands in front of the building, an enormous two-story glass structure with the letters “GH”. Carrol Joe runs up an embankment leading to the sign and crashes through it, completely destroying it and his truck at the same time.

In the last scene, a TV news reporter is announcing that all truckers in Tucson are on strike. The strike is being held in protest of the corrupt system set up by the Glass House and in honor of one trucker who dared to stand up against them, Carrol Jo Hummer. CJ's brother-in-law wheels him out of his hospital room to the parking lot, which is filled with semi-trucks and truckers. They all begin to clap. CJ then begins to smile. Jerri is in a window directly behind him (apparently still hospitalized herself), overlooking all of this. Her lack of a smile may indicate that she is still unsure about living her life as the wife of a whistle-blowing hero who is willing to die for his family and the truth.

== Cast ==
- Jan-Michael Vincent as Carrol Jo "CJ" Hummer / Sam Hummer
- Kay Lenz as Jerri Kane Hummer
- Slim Pickens as Duane Haller
- Sam Laws as "Pops" Dinwiddie
- L.Q. Jones as Buck Wessler
- Don Porter as Cutler
- R.G. Armstrong as Prosecutor
- Leigh French as Lucy
- Dick Miller as "Birdie" Corman
- Martin Kove as Clem
- Neil Summers as Matchstick

== Production ==
Kaplan received the offer to direct the movie from Peter Guber at Columbia Pictures after the success of Truck Turner (1974). He says Guber mistakenly thought Truck Turner was about trucks. He said his goal was to make a modern-day Western, heavily influenced by the films of Sam Peckinpah. Jan-Michael Vincent was cast by Guber, who thought he was going to be a big star; Kaplan claims this was the film where Vincent first used cocaine.

Kaplan said, "politically I was trying to counter-act the right-wing vigilantism of some of the pictures that were around at the time."

Filming was in and around Tucson, Arizona as well as Monument Valley in Utah.

== Reception ==
The film earned $6 million in theatrical rentals in North America.

White Line Fever received mixed critical reviews. The film holds a 33% rating on Rotten Tomatoes based on six reviews.

== See also ==
- List of American films of 1975
