= It's the Law =

Canadian television series

- Genre: Educational
- Written by: Alan King
- Directed by: Tony Partridge
- Presented by: Frank Peddie; Cecil Wright
- Country of origin: Canada
- Original language: English
- No. of seasons: 1

Production
- Producer: David Walker
- Running time: 30 minutes

Original release
- Network: CBC Television
- Release: 1 May – 26 June 1956

Related
- A Case for the Court

It's the Law is a Canadian legal education television program that aired on CBC Television in 1956.

== Premise ==
Legal concepts and information were explained to average Canadians on this series. Each episode featured an explanation of a legal concept followed by its dramatic portrayal as a case. The show then concluded with further discussion of by a member of the Canadian Bar Association which supported CBC's production of the series.

Cecil Wright, the University of Toronto's law dean, joined host Frank Peddie as a series regular. Actors Cec Linder, William Needles, Ed McNamara and Sandy Webster were featured in the dramatic segments.

== Scheduling ==
This half-hour series was broadcast on Tuesdays at 10:00 p.m. (Eastern) from 1 May to 26 June 1956.
