= Don't Let the Angels Fall =

1969 film

- Film poster
- Directed by: George Kaczender
- Written by: Timothy Findley; George Kaczender
- Produced by: John Kemeny
- Starring: Arthur Hill
- Cinematography: Paul Leach
- Edited by: Michael McKennirey
- Music by: David Hassinger & The Collectors
- Distributed by: National Film Board of Canada
- Release date: October 24, 1969
- Running time: 99 minutes
- Country: Canada
- Language: English
- Budget: $161,528

Don't Let the Angels Fall is a 1969 Canadian drama film directed by George Kaczender. In 1971, it was named Best Foreign Feature Film by the Critics and Journalists Association of Ceylon.

== Plot ==
A Montreal businessman (Arthur Hill), who's going through a mid-life crisis and on a business trip out of town, has a brief affair with a divorcée (Sharon Acker). His family is falling apart and his wife (Charmion King) seems incapable of understanding what's going on.

== Cast ==
- Arthur Hill as Robert
- Sharon Acker as Barbara
- Charmion King as Myrna
- Jonathan Michaelson as Guy
- Monique Mercure as Mrs. Pelletier
- Michèle Magny as Diane
- Andrée Lachapelle as Prostitute
- John Kastner as Michael
- Peter Desbarats as TV host
- Ian Ireland as Mr. Ferguson
- Madeleine Rozon as Miss Agnew
- Gwyn MacKenzie as Teacher
- Eileen Clifford as Gladys
- Len Watt as The boss
- Walter Massey as Police sergeant

== Works cited ==
- Evans, Gary (1991). In the National Interest: A Chronicle of the National Film Board of Canada from 1949 to 1989. University of Toronto Press. ISBN 0802027849.
