= The Best Damn Fiddler from Calabogie to Kaladar =

- Directed by: Peter Pearson
- Written by: Joan Finnigan
- Produced by: John Kemeny; Barrie Howells
- Starring: Chris Wiggins; Kate Reid; Margot Kidder; Paisley Maxwell; William Thourlby; Sandy Webster; Jon Granik
- Cinematography: Tony Ianzelo
- Edited by: Michael McKennirey
- Distributed by: National Film Board of Canada
- Release date: 1968
- Running time: 49 minutes
- Country: Canada
- Language: English
- Budget: $82,635

The Best Damn Fiddler from Calabogie to Kaladar is a 1968 National Film Board of Canada (NFB) drama directed by Peter Pearson, produced by John Kemeny and written by Joan Finnigan. The 49-minute drama stars Chris Wiggins and Kate Reid, along with Margot Kidder in her first feature role.

Produced for the NFB's Challenge for Change program, the film had initially been "pushed aside and ignored by CBC TV," according to Canadian film scholar Gerald Pratley, who called it "A brilliant example of what our filmmakers could do if they had the opportunities and the material to replace the run-of-the-mill American films that dominate our theatres and television – the kind of inexpensive creativity private broadcasters continue to say they cannot afford."

== Synopsis ==
The Best Damn Fiddler is a realistic account of an itinerant bush worker (Chris Wiggins) living in the rural area of the Ottawa Valley who cannot make enough money to feed his large family but nevertheless rejects government handouts. The oldest daughter (Margot Kidder) eventually leaves home to find work and a better future.

== Cast ==
- Chris Wiggins - Emery
- Kate Reid - Glad
- Margot Kidder - Rosie
- Bill Thourlby - Adam
- Paisley Maxwell - Miss Angelus
- Sandy Webster - Doctor
- Jon Granik - Interne
- Liza Creighton - Spread
- Paddy Moran - Carson

== Awards ==
Award	Year	Category	Recipient	Result	Ref(s)
Canadian Film Awards	1969	Film of the Year	John Kemeny, Barrie Howells, Peter Pearson	Won	
Canadian Film Awards	1969	Best Television Drama	John Kemeny, Barrie Howells, Peter Pearson	Won	
Canadian Film Awards	1969	Best Actor, Non-Feature	Chris Wiggins	Won	
Canadian Film Awards	1969	Best Direction	Peter Pearson	Won	
Canadian Film Awards	1969	Best Screenplay	Joan Finnegan	Won	
Canadian Film Awards	1969	Best Black-and-White Cinematography	Tony Ianzelo	Won	
Canadian Film Awards	1969	Best Editing, Non-Feature	Michael McKennirey	Won	
Canadian Film Awards	1969	Best Art Direction	Michael Milne	Won	

== Filming locations ==
- The farm locations, dance hall and river scenes were shot at Barryvale, Ontario.
- The downtown scenes were shot in Renfrew, Ontario.

== Works cited ==
- Evans, Gary (1991). In the National Interest: A Chronicle of the National Film Board of Canada from 1949 to 1989. University of Toronto Press. ISBN 0802027849.
