= First Performance =

Canadian television series

- Genre: Drama anthology
- Country of origin: Canada
- Original language: English
- No. of seasons: 3

Production
- Running time: 60 minutes

Original release
- Network: CBC Television
- Release: 3 October 1956 – 4 November 1958

First Performance is a Canadian drama television series that aired on CBC Television from 1956 to 1958.

== Premise ==
These short series of television plays were produced as a promotion for Canada Savings Bonds.

== Scheduling ==
The first season of this 60-minute series was broadcast on Wednesdays at 10:00 p.m. (Eastern) during October 1956. The second season (1957) aired Thursdays at 9:30 p.m., also during the month of October. The final 1958 season was broadcast Tuesdays 9:30 p.m. in October, with the last broadcast on 4 November 1958.

== Episodes ==
=== 1956 season ===
- 3 October 1956: Time Lock (Leo Orenstein producer; Arthur Hailey writer)
- 10 October 1956: O'Brien (Melwyn Breen producer; Joseph Schull writer), a comedy
- 17 October 1956: Black of the Moon (David Greene producer; Leslie MacFarlane writer)
- 24 October 1956: The Discoverers (Ronald Weyman producer; Mac Rosenfeld and George Salverson writers)

=== 1957 season ===
- 3 October 1957: Seeds of Power (Arthur Hailey writer), starring Katherine Blake, Lloyd Bochner, John Drainie and Patrick Macnee
- 10 October 1957: Ice on Fire (Len Peterson writer)
- 17 October 1957: Cousin Elva (Stuart Trueman book, Leslie MacFarlane adaptation), starring Araby Lockhart, Alexander Webster and Helene Winston
- 24 October 1957: Janey Canuck (Byrne Hope Saunders book, Lister Sinclair adaptation), starring Katherine Blake and Lloyd Bochner

=== 1958 season ===
- 7 October 1958: Panic at Parth Bay (Harvey Hart producer; Lester Powell writer), starring Frances Hyland, Leslie Nielsen, Alexander Webster, Hugh Webster, Leslie Yeo and Louis Zorich
- 21 October 1958: The Man in the House (Adrian Waller producer; Marcel Dubé writer; Ivor Barry translation), starring Collette Coutois, Gratien Gélinas, Germaine Giroux, Clement Latour and Ovila Legaré
- 4 November 1958: The Man Who Caught Bullets (Mario Prizek producer; Mavor Moore writer), starring Everett Sloane
