= Joan Finnigan =

Canadian writer and poet

Joan Finnigan in 2005.

Joan Helen Finnigan (November 23, 1925 – August 12, 2007) was a Canadian writer and poet. She won a Genie Award for Best Screenplay in 1969. She wrote over 30 books, many of them oral histories of the Ottawa Valley.

== Personal life ==
Joan Finnigan was born in and raised in Ottawa. She was the daughter of Frank Finnigan, an Ottawa Senators' hockey legend, and mother Maye Horner, and the sister of Frank Jr, Norma and Ross Finnigan. She was educated at Lisgar Collegiate, Carleton University and Queen's University. Together with her husband, Grant Mackenzie, whom she married in 1949, Finnigan had three children, Jonathan, Roderick and Martha Mackenzie.

MacKenzie died in 1965 and Ms. Finnigan raised the children as a single mother, while supporting the family through her writing. Her daughter Martha recalls as a child falling asleep to the sound of the typewriter at night. Finnigan died in Ottawa on August 12, 2007 at the age of 81. She was survived by her three children and seven grandchildren.

== Writing career ==
After graduating from university, Finnigan began her career as a teacher and reporter for the Ottawa Journal. She won the Canadian Film Award for Best Screenplay in 1969 for the 1968 film The Best Damn Fiddler from Calabogie to Kaladar, which starred Margot Kidder. The film also won the Canadian Film Award for Film of the Year.

She published over thirty books during her career, half of them inspired by her native Ottawa Valley, including her ground-breaking, best-selling oral histories such as Some of the Stories I Told You Were True, It Was Warm and Sunny When We Set Out, Legacies, Legends & Lies, Tell Me Another Story and Tallying the Tales of the Old-Timers. Her oral histories have won several prestigious regional awards, while her poetry compendia, The Watershed Collection and Wintering Over, were shortlisted for the Pat Lowther and Trillium Awards, respectively. She also authored 14 collections of poetry, radio scripts, newspaper and magazine articles.

Her final oral history Life along the Opeongo Line was published in 2004. Finnigan was honored in Ottawa with the declaration of April 16, 2005 as "Joan Finnigan Day" by Ottawa mayor Bob Chiarelli. She published her 14th collection of poetry in 2007, "Looking for a Turnout."
