= And No Birds Sing =

1969 Canadian drama film

- Directed by: Victor Cowie
- Produced by: University of Manitoba Students' Union
- Starring: Ian Malcolm; Marsha Sadoway; Michael Posner; Judy Daniels; Brian Stavechny
- Release date: 1969
- Country: Canada
- Language: English

And No Birds Sing is a Canadian drama film, released in 1969. Directed by Victor Cowie and produced by the University of Manitoba Students' Union, the film centres on a university student's attempts to win the love of a female classmate he is romantically interested in. The film's cast included Ian Malcolm, Marsha Sadoway, Michael Posner, Judy Daniels and Brian Stavechny.

The film was a Canadian Film Award nominee in 1969 for Best Film Over 30 Minutes, and Posner won the award for Best Supporting Actor in a Non-Feature.
