= Chasm (video game) =

2018 Metroidvania video game

- Promotional artwork, depicting the protagonist surrounded by the game's NPCs and antagonists
- Developers: Bit Kid, Inc.
- Publishers: Bit Kid, Inc.
- Designer: James Petruzzi
- Programmer: Tim Dodd
- Artists: Dan Fessler; Tony Redmer; Glauber Kotaki
- Composer: James Stevulak
- Platforms: Linux; macOS; Microsoft Windows; PlayStation 4; PlayStation Vita; Nintendo Switch; Xbox One
- Release: Linux, macOS, Windows, PS4, PS Vita; July 31, 2018; Nintendo Switch; October 11, 2018; Xbox One; November 9, 2018
- Genre: Metroidvania
- Mode: Single-player

Chasm is a Metroidvania video game developed and published by Bit Kid, Inc. for Microsoft Windows, macOS, Linux, PlayStation 4 and PlayStation Vita in July 2018, the Nintendo Switch in October 2018, and the Xbox One in November 2018.

== Gameplay ==
Inspired by Castlevania: Symphony of the Night, Chasm tells the story of an aspiring knight eager to prove their worth, on a quest to a mining town whose resources are essential. Although the story is the same for all players, the exact layout of the world map is unique for each adventure, through the game's use of procedural generation combined with handmade room sequences. Combat (also similar to Castlevania) gives the player an option of a melee weapon and a sub-weapon to do most of your damage. As the players venture down into the mine, they can level up, collect new weapons from swords to whips, and use artifacts which make the environment explorable in different ways for new areas. The boss fights in the game rely on memorizing attack patterns. Besides that, there are rooms with moving or disappearing platforms, environmental hazards and traps, making a balance between combat and platforming. On the journey, there are townspeople trapped in cages. Releasing them sends them back up to the town, with a shop or service offered in the process, and unlocks a new sidequest expanding on the service they offer. Each map is segmented into themed sections like catacombs and gardens.

== Development ==
Initial development started in 2012 with a prototype. The main character was only able to fight and jump, and his design barely changed since then. Maryland, USA-based studio Bit Kid, Inc. hoped they could sell the idea of an old-fashioned game to publishers at the Game Developers Conference, but nobody offered to fund the game. The team decided to crowdfund the game instead through Kickstarter in 2013, which was successful.

== Reception ==
Reception

Aggregate score
Aggregator	Score
Metacritic	PC: 72/100; NS: 79/100; XONE: 70/100

Review scores
Publication	Score
Destructoid	7.5/10
Game Informer	7.5/10
GameSpot	8/10
IGN	7/10
Nintendo Life	7/10
Nintendo World Report	9/10
PlayStation Official Magazine – UK	8/10
PC Gamer (US)	78/100
USgamer	4/5
Hardcore Gamer	4.5/5

Critical reception for the PC version of Chasm was mixed to positive. Jeremy Peeples of Hardcore Gamer called it "one of the finest Metroidvanias ever created." Tom Marks of IGN said: "Chasm is a lovely and fun Metroidvania with a lot of cool new ideas, even if its randomized maps are uninteresting." Writing for GameSpot, Tom McShea said: "Chasm is a well-crafted adventure" and praised its "superb combat and visual design."
