= George Kaczender =

Canadian film director

- Born: 19 April 1933; Budapest, Hungary
- Died: 24 August 2016 (aged 83); Century City, Los Angeles, California, U.S.
- Occupations: Director; editor; writer
- Years active: 1957–2014

George Kaczender (19 April 1933 – 24 August 2016) was a Hungarian-born Canadian film director. He directed 26 films between 1963 and 2001.

== Biography ==
Kaczender left Hungary in 1956 as a political refugee after studying film and working as an assistant director at the Pannonia Film Studios in Budapest.

Before coming to Los Angeles in the early 80s he worked at the National Film Board of Canada in Montreal from 1956 to 1969 where he wrote and directed award-winning documentaries and short dramatic features. In 1968 he wrote and directed the award-winning feature film, Don't Let the Angels Fall, starring Arthur Hill, that became the first Canadian feature film invited to the main competition at the 1969 Cannes Film Festival. In 1970 he left the Film Board to work in London with the producer, Oscar Lewenstein. The same year he became one of the founding partners of International Cinemedia Center in Montreal.

In the 1970s he directed numerous award-winning educational films for Learning Corporation of America and five theatrical feature films before leaving Canada for Hollywood. Among them, In Praise of Older Women based on the best-selling novel by S. Vizinczey, and Chanel Solitaire, the life of Coco Chanel, shot on location in France.

He has worked with stars such as Robert Mitchum, Richard Harris, Jeanne Moreau, Tom Berenger, JoBeth Williams, Brad Pitt, George Clooney and Karen Black. He has also directed numerous films for network and cable television such as Jonathan: The Boy Nobody Wanted.

His film Don't let the Angels Fall was nominated for the Palme d'Or at the 1969 Cannes Film Festival and his film The Girl in Blue was nominated for the Golden Bear at the 1973 Berlin Film Festival. He has numerous international awards for his work on documentaries and short dramatic films.

His first novel, An Unreasonable Notion of Desire, was self-published in 2000 through Xlibris. His second novel, "Notebooks of an Incurable Romantic", was published in 2013 by Red Cat Tales Publishing.

Between 2002 and 2004 he was adjunct professor at the University of Southern California School of Cinema-Television, teaching film directing.

== Selected filmography ==
- Don't Let the Angels Fall (1969)
- Freud: The Hidden Nature of Man (1970)
- The Girl in Blue (1973)
- In Praise of Older Women (1978)
- Agency (1980)
- Your Ticket Is No Longer Valid (1981)
- Chanel Solitaire (1982)
- Tomorrow's a Killer (1987)
- Jonathan: The Boy Nobody Wanted (1993)
- Christy: A Change of Seasons (2001)

== Publications ==
- "An Unreasonable Notion of Desire" (2000)
- "Notebooks of an Incurable Romantic" (2013)
