= Film Advisory Board =

The Film Advisory Board (FAB) is a member-supported organization founded in 1975 by Elayne Blythe (1919–2005). The FAB's "Award of Excellence" was developed to award quality family-oriented and children's entertainment in both print and electronic media.

The second division of FAB is the FAB Ratings System. Originally developed by Elayne Blythe in four categories ("L", "V", "N" and "S", for (respectively) Language, Violence, Nudity and Sex), the present system was developed in 1988 at the request of independent film makers and distributors as an alternative to the Motion Picture Association of America film rating system. The FAB ratings system is intended to be less costly and more informative than the MPAA's system. The ratings fee is based on the film's running time instead of negative cost, and the ratings are based on the level of maturity of the material's intended audience, rather than the film's content.

While the FAB ratings system is not as recognized or well known as the MPAA's rating system, it is in use by a number of commercial video distributors for direct-to-video releases that would have been impractical to submit to the MPAA.

== Rating system ==
The Film Advisory Board has six ratings categories. Each includes a brief description as to the rating's explanation, such as "Violence in Battle Scenes", "Substance Abuse" or "Brief Nudity".

C rating symbol

Children
C - Ages 10 and under.

F rating symbol

Family
F - All ages.

PD rating symbol

Parental Discretion
PD - Content description implies age suitability.
Formerly M (Mature).

PD-M rating symbol

Parental Discretion-Mature
PD -M - Ages 13 and over.
Formerly VM (Very Mature).

EM rating symbol

Extremely Mature
EM - Ages 17 and over.

AO rating symbol

Adults Only
AO - Ages 18 and over only.

== Criticism of the Seal of Excellence ==
The Film Advisory Board has come under criticism as of late with the seemingly wide use of the FAB Seal of Excellence, with critics stating that while the seal denotes family-friendly entertainment, it does not always denote quality. Critic Erik Childress has criticized the Film Advisory Board for being hypocritical in its application of the Seal of Excellence, in part because it was applied to such films as Deck the Halls and the 2006 remake of The Pink Panther, both of which he felt violated the FAB's listed guidelines by including "strong sexual content...related to sex and titillation". When Gelf Magazine contacted Janet Stokes, current head of the FAB, about awarding the FAB Seal of Excellence to the box-office flop Deck the Halls, she admitted that the FAB does not review movies, but determines which are suitable for children:

We're not critics. Critics are people who say the 'yay' or the 'nay'. We don’t do that. If we can't say something good about a film, we don’t give them an award.
