= Jean Beaudin =

Canadian film director and screenwriter (1939–2019)

- Born: 6 February 1939; Montreal, Quebec, Canada
- Died: 18 May 2019 (aged 80)
- Occupations: Film director Screenwriter
- Years active: 1966–2019

Jean Beaudin (French pronunciation: [ʒɑ̃ bodɛ̃]; 6 February 1939 – 18 May 2019) was a Canadian film director and screenwriter. He directed 20 films since 1969. His film J.A. Martin Photographer, was entered into the 1977 Cannes Film Festival, where Monique Mercure won the award for Best Actress. The film also won best Film, he won best Director, and Mercure won best Actress awards at the 1977 Canadian Film Awards. He was nominated (but did not win) for the Genie Award for Best Achievement in Direction in 1986, 1992 and 2003 for his films The Alley Cat (Le Matou), Being at Home with Claude and The Collector (Le Collectionneur), respectively.

Actress Domini Blythe (1947–2010) was his partner of more than 20 years.

== Early career ==
Jean Beaudin received a diploma from Ecole des Beaux-Arts in Montreal and studied at the School of Design in Zurich. He first joined the National Film Board of Canada in 1964, working initially in the animation studios, then subsequently directing educational films. He made a number for a mathematical series, then Vertige, a psychological study, before he directed his first feature, Stop, in 1971. Although Beaudin took a few shots at wild and visionary moviemaking, he was best known for the restrained performances and fastidious visuals of pictures such as his 1977 masterpiece J.A. Martin, photographe, which has been consistently nominated by critics as one of the best Canadian features ever made. Since J.A. Martin, Beaudin's career was focused exclusively in Quebec with Cordélia, Mario, the film version of the stage hit Being at Home with Claude, and the hugely popular television series, Les Filles de Caleb.

== Filmography ==
=== Features and shorts ===
- Stop - 1971
- The Possession of Virginia (Le diable est parmi nous) - 1972
- Les indrogables - 1972, short film
- Trois fois passera - 1973, short film
- Par une belle nuit d'hiver - 1974, short film
- Cher Théo - 1975, short film
- J.A. Martin Photographer (J.A. Martin, photographe) - 1977
- Cordélia - 1979
- Mario - 1984
- The Alley Cat (Le Matou) - 1985
- La bioéthique: une question de choix - L'homme à la traîne - 1986, short film
- Being at Home with Claude - 1992
- Memories Unlocked (Souvenirs intimes) - 1998
- The Collector (Le Collectionneur) - 2002
- Battle of the Brave (Nouvelle-France) - 2004
- Without Her (Sans elle) - 2006

=== Other work ===
- Géométrie (Documentary series, 1966)
- Mathématiques (Documentary series, 1967)
- Vertige (Documentary short, 1969)
- Et pourquoi pas? (Documentary short, 1969)
- Games of the XXI Olympiad (Jeux de la XXIe olympiade) (Documentary Co-Directed with Marcel Carrière, Georges Dufaux, and Jean-Claude Labrecque, 1977)
- Une journée dans les parcs nationaux (Documentary short, 1979)
- Mount-Royal (TV series, 1987)
- L'or et le papier (TV series, 1989)
- Les filles de Caleb (TV series, 1990–1991)
- Shehaweh (TV mini-series, 1992)
- Les minutes du patrimoine (TV series, 1993)
- Craque la vie! (TV movie, 1994)
- Miséricorde (TV mini-series, 1994)
- Ces enfants d'ailleurs (TV mini-series, 1997)
- The Hunger (TV series, 1998)
- Big Wolf on Campus (TV series, 2000)
- Willie (TV mini-series, 2000)
