= Peter Pearson (director) =

Canadian film director and screenwriter (1938–2025)

Peter Pearson OC
- Born: March 13, 1938; Toronto, Ontario, Canada
- Died: April 2, 2025 (aged 87); Montreal, Quebec, Canada
- Occupations: Film director Screenwriter; Film producer
- Years active: 1964–1994

Peter Robb Pearson OC (March 13, 1938 – April 2, 2025) was a Canadian film director and screenwriter.

== Life and career ==
Pearson was born in Toronto on March 13, 1938. He studied political science and economics at the University of Toronto and television production at Ryerson Institute of Technology before attending film school in Rome. Upon his return to Canada, his first job was as a journalist for the Timmins Daily Press. In 1964 he was hired by the CBC and worked there for two years as a director-producer-writer. He joined the NFB in 1966 where he began making documentaries, including three with American social activist Saul Alinsky. His work received nineteen Canadian Film Awards – more than any other Canadian director. His two most notable features – The Best Damn Fiddler from Calabogie to Kaladar and Paperback Hero (1973) – are landmarks in English-Canadian cinema. From 1975 to 1981 he served as a director on the TV series For The Record, and was responsible for the innovative and controversial episodes The Insurance Man from Ingersoll (1976), Nest of Shadows (1976), Kathy Karuks is a Grizzly Bear (1976), The Tar Sands (1977) and Snowbirds (1981).

Pearson, like many of his contemporary filmmakers, was continually frustrated by the lack of opportunity in the Canadian film industry and remained a persistent lifelong activist and champion in the cause of Canadian cinema. From 1972 to 1975 he served as president of the Directors Guild of Canada and as chairman of the 15,000-member Council of Canadian Filmmakers. After teaching film for one year at Queen's University (1982–83), he headed the Canadian Film Development Corporation's newly created Broadcast Program Development Fund from 1983 to 1985. The corporation became Telefilm Canada and he served as its executive director from 1985 to 1987.

He was appointed an Officer of the Order of Canada in 2023. He resided in Montreal.

Pearson died due to Parkinson's disease and dementia at Sainte-Anne-de-Bellevue hospital in Montreal, on April 2, 2025, at the age of 87.

== Selected filmography ==
- The Best Damn Fiddler from Calabogie to Kaladar (1968)
- The Dowry (1969)
- Seasons in the Mind (1970)
- Paperback Hero (1973)
- Along These Lines (1974)
- A Thousand Miles of Holidays (1974)
- Only God Knows (1974)
- The Insurance Man from Ingersoll (1976)
- Snowbird (1981)
- Heaven on Earth (1987)
- Bananas from Sunny Quebec (1993)
- L'Or et le Papier (1994)
