= Clifford Chadderton =

Canadian World War II veteran

H. Clifford Chadderton
- Born: 9 May 1919; Fort William, Ontario, Canada
- Died: 30 November 2013 (aged 94)
- Occupation: Chief Executive Officer of The War Amps
- Known for: Canadian Veteran advocate

Hugh Clifford Chadderton, CC OOnt (9 May 1919 – 30 November 2013) was a Canadian World War II veteran and chief executive officer of The War Amps.

== Life and career ==
Born in Fort William, Ontario, he worked as a news editor for Canadian Press and a reporter for the Winnipeg Free Press and he attended the University of Manitoba. Chadderton played for the Winnipeg Rangers hockey team, the farm team for the New York Rangers.

He enlisted on 15 October 1939, serving with The Royal Winnipeg Rifles of the Non-Permanent Active Militia. Chadderton rose from non-commissioned rank to officer commanding an infantry company with the acting rank of Major. He was stationed in Britain, France, Belgium and the Netherlands. He was wounded twice, once by a bullet at the Abbaye d'Ardenne in Normandy and once by a grenade near the Leopold Canal, losing his right leg below the knee.

In 1965, Chadderton became the chief executive officer of The War Amps.

In 1967, the Government of Canada named Chadderton to the position of Executive Secretary to the Canadian Pension Survey Committee along with Hon. Judge Randall and Colonel Roger Nantel under the Department of Veterans Affairs in Ottawa, Ontario.

He was Chairman of the National Council of Veteran Associations in Canada, an umbrella organization for a variety of veterans' groups.

Chadderton played a leading role in the campaign against the controversial NFB documentary, The Kid Who Couldn't Miss and in pressuring the Canadian War Museum to rewrite its Bomber Command exhibit. In 1992, he led the fight to put pressure on the Canadian Broadcasting Corporation (CBC) from re-broadcasting a controversial documentary series it commissioned called The Valour and the Horror. The CBC's Ombudsman, Bill Morgan, decided with Chadderton, and stated that "the series was 'flawed' and 'fails to measure up' to CBC's standards."

Chadderton married Dorothy Barnfather, with whom he had two children, four grandchildren, and five great-grandchildren. He married his third wife, Nina, in the 1980s.

He died at the age of 94 on 30 November 2013. He is survived by his wife, Nina, sons Bill (Marlyn), Brian (Donna), stepson Gleb, stepdaughter Sandra (Clare) as well as several grandchildren and great-grandchildren.

== Honours ==
- In 1977, he was made a Member of the Order of Canada.
- In 1986, he was promoted to an Officer of the Order of Canada.
- In 1987, he was named a Serving Brother of The Most Venerable Order of the Hospital of St. John of Jerusalem, more commonly known as the Order of St. John.
- In 1990, he was raised to the rank of Officer Brother of the Order of St. John (OStJ).
- In 1990, he was awarded an Honorary Doctor of Civil Law (DCL) from Acadia University.
- In 1991, he was awarded the Order of Ontario.
- In 1992, he received a Doctor of Laws, Honoris causa, from the University of Winnipeg.
- In 1998, he was promoted to a Companion of the Order of Canada (CC).
- In 1999, he was granted an Honorary Doctor of Laws by the University of Victoria and inducted into the Terry Fox Hall of Fame.
- In 2001, he was admitted to the Military and Hospitaller Order of Saint Lazarus of Jerusalem in the rank of Commander (CLJ).
- In 2004, he was named a Knight in the Order of the Legion of Honour of France.
