= Journey to the End of Coal =

- Directed by: Samuel Bollendorff and Abel Ségrétin
- Produced by: Arnaud Dressen (Honkytonk Films)
- Distributed by: lemonde.fr / with the support of CNC and the SCAM in partnership with Amnesty International / Reporters Without Borders
- Release date: 2008
- Country: France
- Languages: French; English

Journey to the End of Coal is a French web documentary directed by Samuel Bollendorff and Abel Segretin.

Based on the choose your own adventure principle, the interactive documentary tells the story of millions of Chinese coal miners who are risking their lives to satisfy their country's appetite for economic growth.

== Award ==
Journey to the End of Coal won the Prix SCAM 2009 digital interactive artwork award.

== Special screenings ==
- IDFA Doclab, Amsterdam – November 2008
- Cinema du Réel, Paris – March 2009
- South by Southwest, Austin, Texas – March 2009
- Visions du Réel festival, Nyon, Switzerland – April 2009
- Sunny Side of The Doc, La Rochelle, France – June 2009
- Festival des 4 Ecrans, Paris, France – October 2009
- Sheffield Doc/Fest, Sheffield, UK – November 2009

== Read also ==
- http://chinadigitaltimes.net/2009/09/video-journey-to-the-end-of-coal/
- https://web.archive.org/web/20100526141641/http://www.innovativeinteractivity.com/2009/09/07/honytonk-and-31septembre-introduce-interactive-documentary/
