= André Lamy =

Canadian film producer

André Lamy (19 July 1932 – 2 May 2010) was a Canadian film producer, who served as Canada's Government Film Commissioner from 1975 until 1979. In this position he was the Chairman of the National Film Board of Canada (NFB).

Lamy was born in Montreal, Quebec, and studied at two universities; the Université de Montréal and McGill University.

During the 1960s he worked as a producer for the Montreal-based company Niagara Films, and then later with Onyx Films, a company which was owned by his brother, Pierre Lamy. In this period he worked on several important films, including Claude Fournier's Deux femmes en or. Released in 1970, this held the record for the most profitable film made in Quebec for the following sixteen years.

In 1970 Lamy was recruited to become the Assistant Film Commissioner of the NFB, making him Sydney Newman's deputy in the running of the organisation. As Newman spoke only English, Lamy took a leading role in the NFB's French language output; Québécois filmmakers dealt almost entirely with him. It was in this capacity that Lamy drew Newman's attention to potential problems with several politically sensitive French Canadian productions made around the time of the October Crisis, including Denys Arcand's On est au coton, which Newman banned from distribution. When Lamy succeeded Newman as Government Film Commissioner in 1975 he authorised the release of several of these same productions, feeling that enough time had elapsed since the October Crisis for their distribution to be a less sensitive matter.

Lamy left his position at the NFB in January 1979. In 1980 he became the head of the Canadian Film Development Commission, and in 1984 he was responsible for renaming this organisation as "Telefilm Canada", to reflect the fact that it also invested in television as well as film productions.

He was also the executive producer on The Little Flying Bears and Sharky & George for CinéGroupe.

In 1992 he was one of the producers of the controversial documentary series The Valour and the Horror, a co-production of the NFB and the Canadian Broadcasting Corporation. The series was criticised by some veterans of World War II for its accusations of unprosecuted war crimes committed by Canadian troops. Reaction to the series was so severe that one of Lamy's successors as Commissioner of the NFB, Joan Pennefather, was forced to appear before the Senate Subcommittee on Veterans' Affairs to defend the programmes.

An announcement was made on 5 May 2010 that Lamy had died over the previous weekend, 1 or 2 May. James Moore, the Minister of Canadian Heritage, was quoted as saying "Lamy's dedication to the NFB and his passion for film serve as reminders of his important contribution to our country's cultural landscape."

Cultural offices
Preceded by Sydney Newman	Government Film Commissioner and Chairperson of the National Film Board of Canada; 1975–1979	Succeeded by James de Beaujeu Domville
