= National Film Board of Canada =

Public film and digital media producer and distributor

- The "Visionary Man" logo since 2003

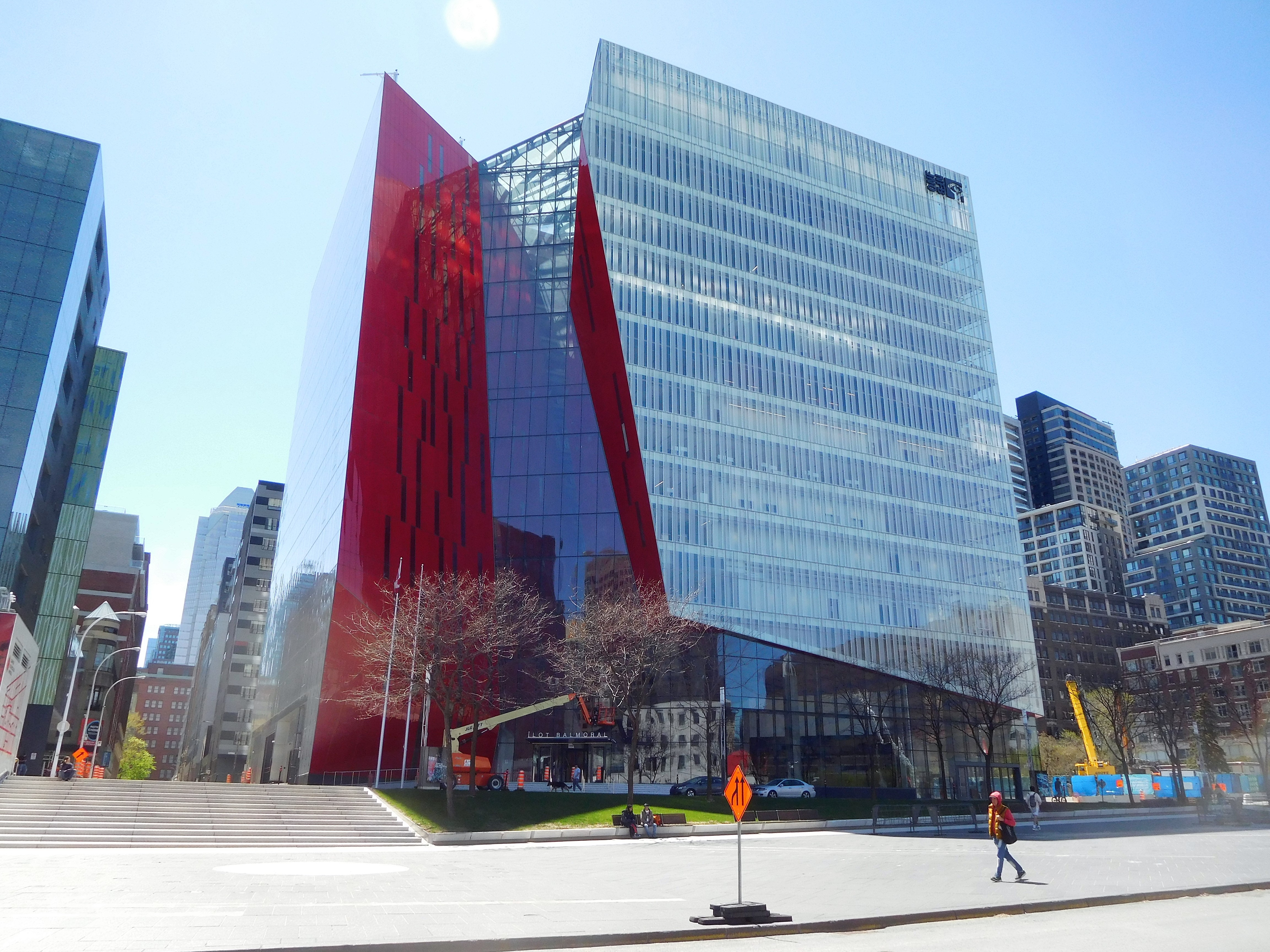
- NFB headquarters in Montreal, 2020
- Abbreviation: NFB
- Founded: May 2, 1939; 87 years ago in Ottawa, Ontario
- Founder: Government of Canada
- Type: Federal agency
- Purpose: Film and interactive media producer and distributor
- Headquarters: Montreal, Quebec, Canada
- Official language: English, French
- Government Film Commissioner and NFB Chairperson: Suzanne Guèvremont
- Website: nfb.ca

The National Film Board of Canada (NFB; French: Office national du film du Canada, ONF) is a Canadian public film and digital media producer and distributor. An agency of the Government of Canada, the NFB produces and distributes documentary films, animation, web documentaries, and alternative dramas. In total, the NFB has produced over 43,000 productions since its inception, which have won over 5,000 awards. The NFB reports to the Parliament of Canada through the Minister of Canadian Heritage. It has bilingual production programs and branches in English and French, including multicultural-related documentaries.

== History ==
=== Canadian Government Motion Picture Bureau ===
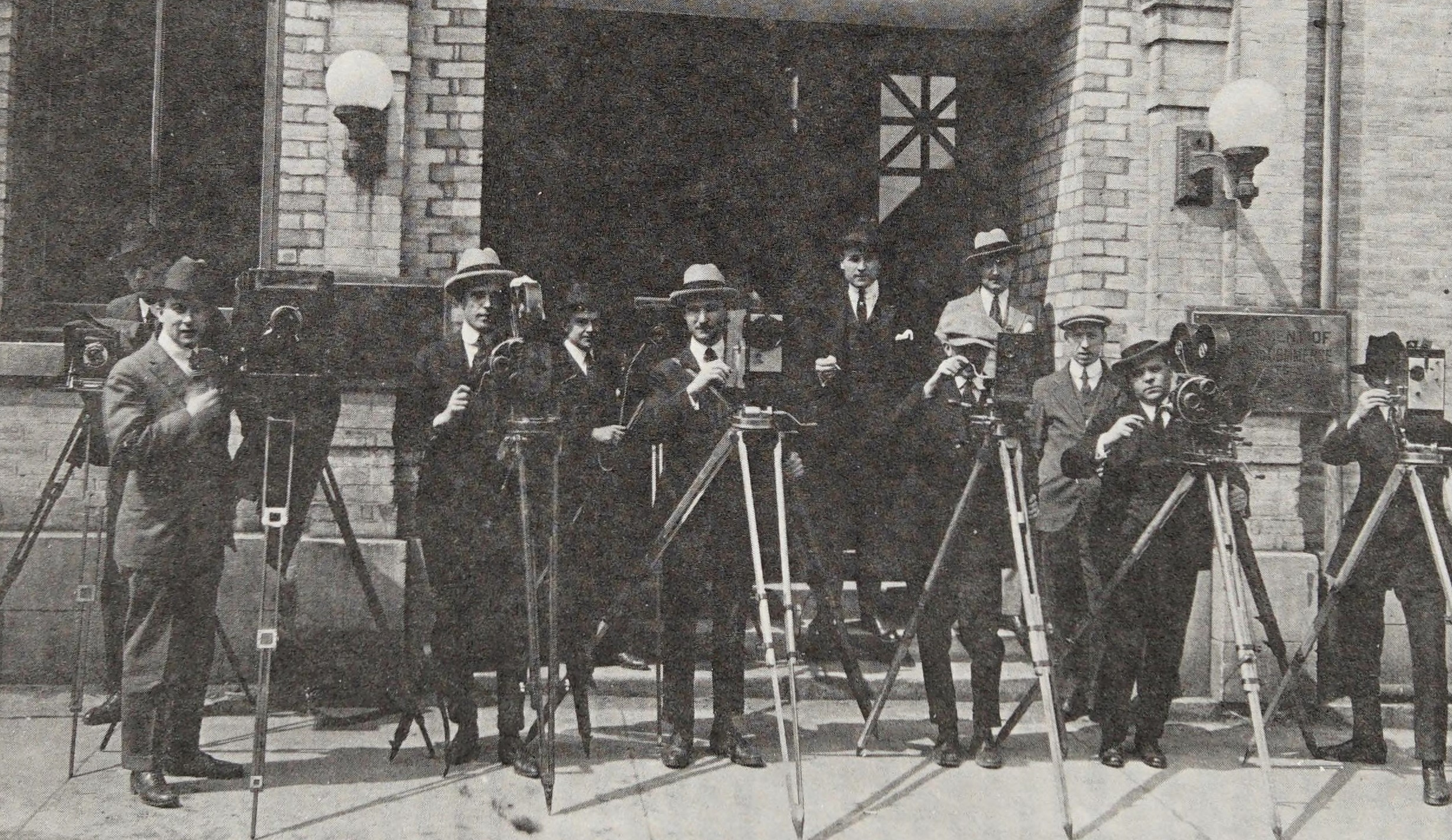
A group of cameramen who worked for the Canadian Government Motion Picture Bureau in 1925. Frank Badgley, the bureau's director from 1927 to 1941, is in the background.

The Exhibits and Publicity Bureau was founded on 19 September 1918, and was reorganized into the Canadian Government Motion Picture Bureau in 1923. The organization's budget stagnated and declined during the Great Depression.

Frank Badgley, who served as the bureau's director from 1927 to 1941, stated that the bureau needed to transition to sound films or else it would lose its access to theatrical releases, but the organization did not gain the equipment until 1934, and by then it had lost its theatrical distributors. Badgley was able to get a 16 mm film facility for the bureau in 1931. The bureau was reorganized into the National Film Board of Canada on 11 June 1941, following John Grierson's recommendation.

=== Foundation and early history ===
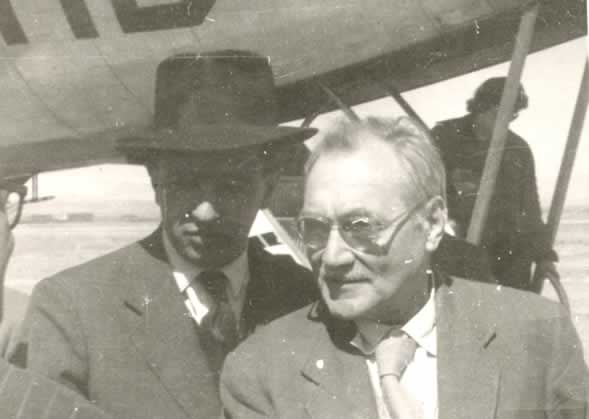
John Grierson was the first commissioner of the National Film Board of Canada.

Ross McLean was working as the secretary to High Commissioner Vincent Massey when he met Grierson, and asked for Grierson to come to Canada to aide in the governmental film policy. Grierson made a report on the Canadian film industry in 1938, and the National Film Act, which he drafted, was passed on 2 May 1939 causing the creation of the NFB. The position of Film Commissioner was left vacant for months, as Ned Corbett declined the appointment, until Grierson, who proposed Badgley and Walter Turnbull for the position, accepted the position for six months in October 1939, but served until 1945. Grierson selected McLean to work as assistant commissioner and Stuart Legg to oversee the productions. Grierson sent in a letter of resignation on 27 November 1940, in protest of the CGMPB and NFB not being merged, but agreed to stay on for another six months and the merger happened. Employment rose from 55 to 787 from 1941 to 1945, although it was cut by 40% after the war ended.

The Case of Charlie Gordon was the NFB's first English-language film and Un du 22e was its first French-language film. In 1944, Grierson established twelve units to handle production; The World in Action and Canada Carries On, Industrial Relations, Health and Rehabilitation, Newsreel and Armed Forces, Animation, Dominion-Provincial, Travel and Outdoors, Armed Services, Foreign Language Programme, French Language Programme, Agriculture, and Education. Employees were contracted for three months as Grierson believed that job security hurt organizational creativity, but most employees worked longer than three months.

Grierson made efforts to increase the theatrical distribution of NFB films, primarily its war-related films, as he was coordinating wartime information for the United Kingdom in North America. Famous Players aided in distribution and the Canadian Motion Picture War Services Committee, which worked with the War Activities Committee of the Motion Pictures Industry, was founded in 1940. NFB productions such as The World in Action was watched by 30-40 million people per month in the United Kingdom and United States in 1943, and Canada Carries On was watched by 2.25 million people by 1944. The audience for NFB newsreels reached 40-50 million per week by 1944. In 1942, the NFB and the Wartime Information Board organized 30 film circuits that would bring NFB films to 20 rural areas once a month. By 1945, this number grew to 92 circuits with an attendance of 2,220 per circuit.

Grierson opposed feature film production as he believed that Canada did not have a large enough market for an independent feature film industry. He supported working with American film companies and stated that "the theatre film business is an international business, dependent when it comes to distribution on an alliance or understanding with American film interests". He travelled to Hollywood in 1944, and the NFB sent scripts to American companies for consideration.

With 800 employees in 1945, the NFB was one of the largest film studios in the world.

=== Ross McLean administration ===
Grierson lacked strong support in the Canadian government and some of his films received opposition from members of the government. Inside Fighting Russia was criticized for its support of the Russian Revolution and Balkan Powderkeg for criticizing the United Kingdom's policy in the Balkans. Grierson and the NFB were attacked during the onset of the Cold War. The Federal Bureau of Investigation created a file on Grierson in 1942, due to the World in Action newsreel being considered too left-wing. Leo Dolan, an ally of Hepburn and the head of the Canadian Government Travel Bureau, accused Grierson of being Jewish and a Co-operative Commonwealth Federation supporter. The Gouzenko Affair implicated Freda Linton, one of Grierson's secretaries, and the organization was criticized by the Progressive Conservative Party for subversive tendencies, financial waste, and being a monopoly. Grierson was also accused of being involved, but was proven not to be.

During McLean's tenure film production was divided into four units in 1948. Unit A dealt with agriculture, non-English, and interpretative films, Unit B dealt with sponsored, scientific, cultural, and animated films, Unit C dealt with theatrical, newsreels, tourist, and travel films, and Unit D dealt with international affairs and special projects. This system continued until its abolition on 28 February 1964 when it had seven units, five English-language and two French-language.

In 1947, Grant McLean, the cousin of the NFB commissioner, shot The People Between and the Secretary of State for External Affairs's department stated that some parts of the film were too favorable towards the Chinese Communist Party. Quebec Premier Maurice Duplessis had NFB films removed from schools using accusations of communism.

The Royal Canadian Mounted Police discovered that an employee for the NFB's Production Division, who was a communist, took photos of top-secret military equipment. The Department of National Defence prohibited the NFB from making films for it. Ross McLean followed the recommendations of the department and declared the NFB a vulnerable agency and the RCMP requested the firing of 36 employees. The RCMP requested him to fire a list of employees, McLean refused to fire any employees without their disloyalty being proven. He was not reappointed as commissioner and replaced by William Arthur Irwin in 1950. Irwin reduced the demand and only three were fired.

Vincent Paquette became the NFB's first French-Canadian filmmaker in 1941, and directed La Cité de Notre-Dame, the board's first in-house French-language film, in 1942. The number of French-Canadian employees grew to seventeen by 1945, and a quarter of the board's budget was spent on French productions. Seventy English films were released by the board in 1949, while four French films were released. The Massey Commission and Gratien Gélinas, a member of the NFB's Board of Governors, called for an improvement in French-language productions, but Duplessis opposed it.

=== Irwin administration ===
Irwin, the editor of Maclean's, was selected to replace McLean as commissioner of the NFB. The Financial Post, one of the NFB's leading critics and the sister publication of Maclean's, stopped its criticism following Irwin's selection and Kenneth Wilson, one of the NFB's strongest critics, died in a plane crash although Floyd Chalmers, the president of Maclean-Hunter, criticized Irwin for leaving Maclean's.

Film production was centralized under Irwin by having one person oversee the four film units. He selected Donald Mulholland over James Beveridge and Mulholland was criticized for ignoring French-language film production. Unit E, dealing with sponsored work, and Unit F, dealing with French-language films, were created in 1951.

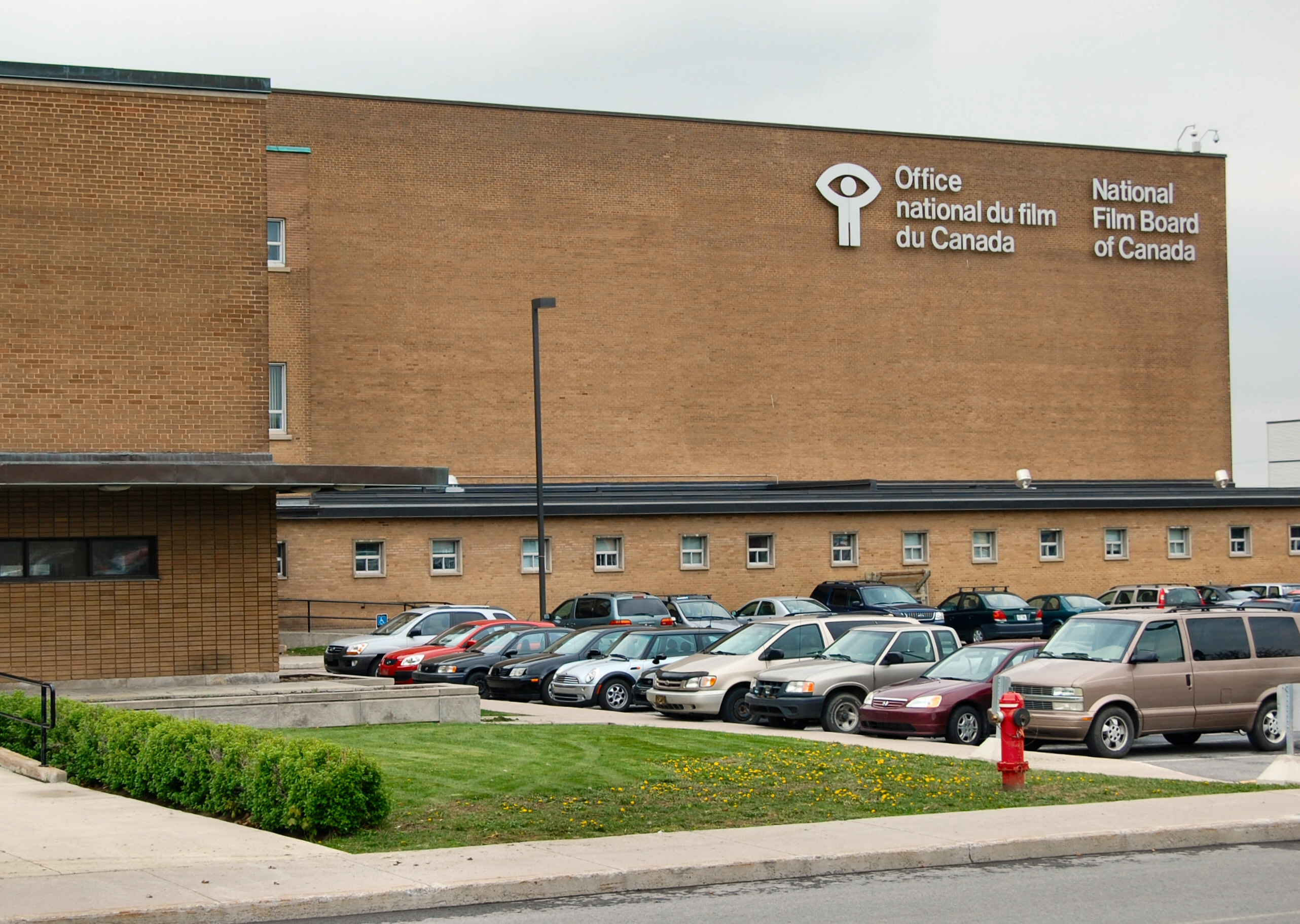
The Norman McLaren Building in Saint-Laurent, Montreal, Quebec, former NFB headquarters from 1956 until 2019.

The Royal Commission on National Development in the Arts, Letters and Sciences, with Massey as its chair, was formed in 1949. The NFB submitted a brief asking to have a headquarters constructed, budget increases, and to become a Crown corporation. Robert Winters, whose ministry oversaw the NFB, stated that its brief did not represent government policy. The Association of Motion Picture Producers and Laboratories of Canada submitted a brief criticizing a government monopoly, with the NFB's crown corporation request being referred to as an "expansionist, monopolistic psychology", and that they were unable to compete with the NFB as it paid no taxes and was exempt from tariffs. The commission's report supported the NFB and its requests for Crown corporation status and a headquarters were accepted.

In 1950, Irwin wrote to Robert Winters about a report on restructuring the NFB and Winters told Irwin to rewrite the 1939 Film Act as it was outdated by then. The National Film Act was passed in June, and took effect on October 14.

A Canadian tour by Princess Elizabeth and Prince Philip was filmed using 35 mm Eastman colour-film stock, which was not available to the public yet. The film was initially meant to be two reels, worth twenty minutes, but grew to five reels as they could not determine what to cut. Irwin met with Harvey Harnick, the NFB's Columbia theatrical distributor, and J.J. Fitzgibbons, the president of Famous Players, and Fitzgibbons told Irwin that he would screen all five reels if the film was completed for a Christmas release. Royal Journey opened in seventeen first-run theatres and over course of the next two years it was screened in 1,249 Canadian theatres where it was watched by a record two million people and the film was also screened in forty other countries. The film cost $88,000, but the NFB gained a profit of $150,000 and the film's success was one of the reasons Grierson stated that Irwin "saved the Film Board".

The NFB created its first television series, Window on Canada and On the Spot, with the CBC in 1953. However, the CBC opposed increasing the number of NFB productions as they believed it was hurting CBC's growth. The majority of the filmmakers in the NFB opposed moving into television. Sydney Newman and Gordon Burwash, who supported moving into television, were sent to the United States in 1948 to learn about TV production and NBC was given the right to air NBC productions in exchange. When Newman and Burwash returned, they joined the CBC as the NFB was unable to move into television. Half of all productions by the NFB were made to air on television by 1955. In 1956, the CBC's exclusion grew to them making Hawkeye and the Last of the Mohicans with the expressed prohibition of NFB involvement and rejecting a show by the NFB based on Jake and the Kid.

=== Trueman administration ===
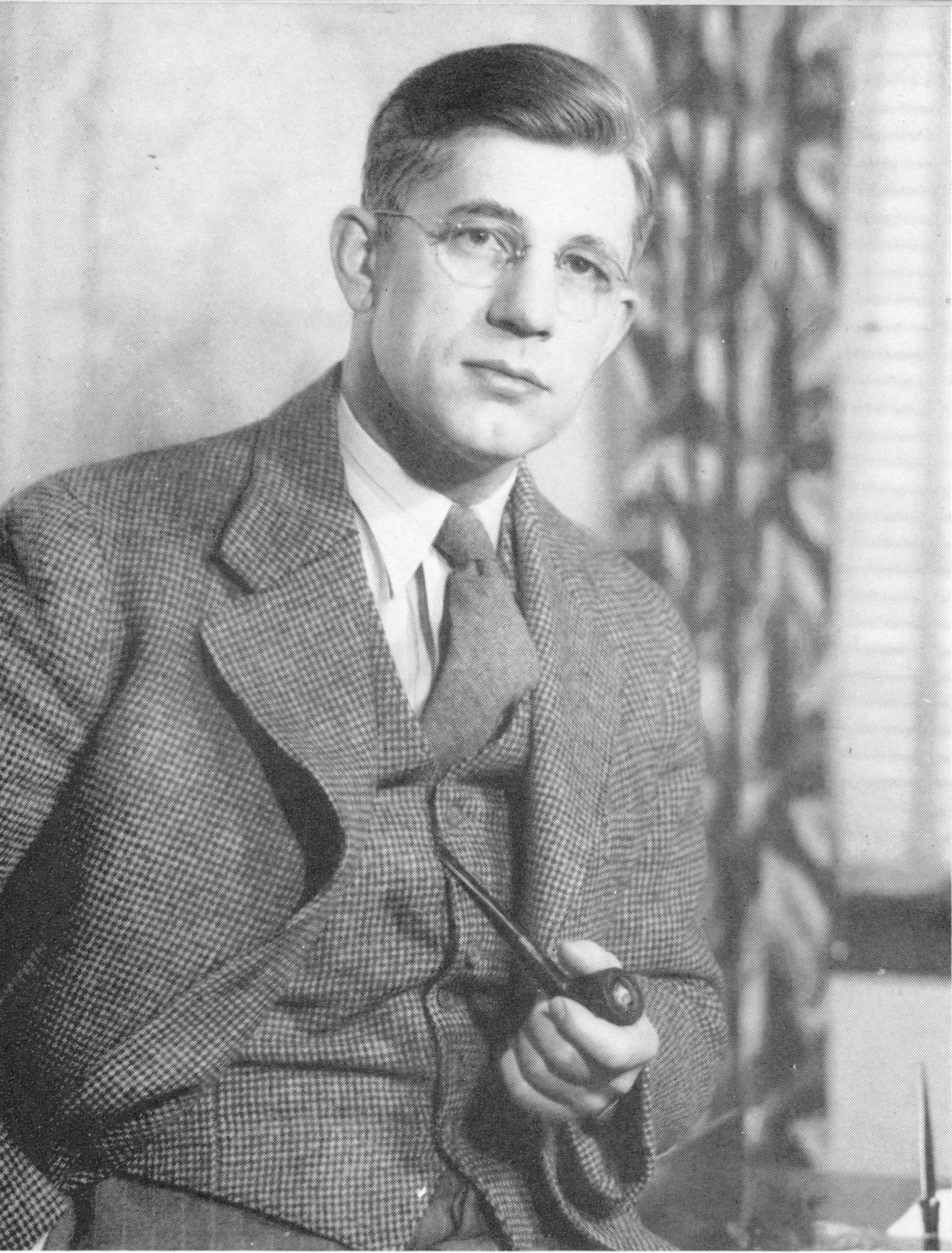
Albert Trueman was NFB commissioner from 1953 to 1957

Irwin resigned as commissioner in May 1953, and later stated that he wanted to be more involved in film production, but his time was being taken up by administrative purposes. Albert Trueman, president of the University of New Brunswick and a member of the board of governors of the NFB and CBC, was selected by Winters to replace Irwin. A reshuffling of the cabinet had Walter Edward Harris become the new minister responsible for the NFB.

Since the foundation of the NFB its offices were divided across multiple locations in Ottawa and plans created during World War II to construct a single headquarters were not acted upon. Montreal was selected during Irwin's administration due to its bilingualism and two Canadian Broadcasting Corporation television stations being created there. Prime Minister Louis St. Laurent reached an agreement with Duplessis to allow the move. Donald Mulholland, the director of production, ended his support for the relocation to Montreal after Irwin's resignation and argued against it. Trueman did not take a position and instead sent the information to Harris. St. Laurent was angered by this and asked Winters if Trueman was attempting to sabotage the relocation and Trueman told Winters that he was just giving Harris information about the situation. The Conservatives criticized the rising cost of the headquarters' construction and attempted to block it, but failed. The building was constructed from 1953 to 1956, at a cost of $5.25 million and served as the NFB's headquarters until 2019. Most of the NFB's operations and 400 employees were moved to Saint-Laurent, Quebec, from 1955 to 1956.

In September 1954, Quebec censors demanded that the NFB pay a censorship fee of $20,500 per year and Trueman wanted to accept it in order to avoid controversy. However, a compromise was reached where the Quebec censors were given one print of each film and if they censored it then all versions would be also censored while the NFB would pay an annual fee between $2,500-3,000.

Pierre Juneau, who was sent to the United Kingdom by Irwin, was brought by Trueman to the NFB as an adviser and secretary in 1953. The creation of two assistant commissioners, one English and one French, with Juneau as the French assistant commissioner was proposed in November 1954, but was rejected by Jack Pickersgill, who replaced Harris, over the course of the next three years. André Laurendeau criticized the NFB for not creating a French-language side. In February 1957, Pickersgill allowed for Juneau to become the executive director and be in charge of financial administration and distribution. This was criticized by Montréal-Matin, Le Devoir, L'Action catholique, and other French-language media and Juneau was criticized for demoting Roger Blais, who claimed it was for him criticizing the salary inequality between French and English speakers.

=== Roberge administration ===
Trueman accepted the position of commissioner with the promise that he would later be given a more prestigious position. He resigned during the French media criticism to become head of the Canada Council in 1957. He suggested Gérard Pelletier as his successor, but Guy Roberge, a former Liberal member of the Legislative Assembly of Quebec who had written sections of the Massey report, was selected instead as the first French-Canadian commissioner. Le Devoir supported his selection and the French media ended its criticism of the NFB.

Ellen Fairclough, who became the minister responsible for the NFB in May 1958, was not interested with the organization and never saw a film created by the NFB. She declined to interfere in NFB matters despite criticism from Pickersgill, who believed that the minister was responsible for whatever went on at the NFB.

Upon his arrival at the NFB in 1953, Juneau saw the difficulties of communication between French and English speakers and supported creating separate English and French production units. Additional units for French-language film production were created in 1958. A French-language branch of the NFB that was independent of its English-language productions was formed on January 1, 1964, under the leadership of Pierre Juneau. One-third of the NFB's budget was given to French-language productions.

Drylanders, the organization's first English language feature-length fiction film, was released in 1963. In February 1964, the English-language production units were replaced by a talent pool system where producers had less power and directors had more power. The French-language production units were replaced in September 1968. The pool system lasted until its replacement by the studio system in 1971.

In 1962, Roberge proposed the creation of an organization to aid in film finance based on the National Film Finance Corporation and Centre national du cinéma et de l'image animée. The Interdepartmental Committee on the Possible Development of a Feature Film Industry in Canada, under Roberge's leadership, was formed by the secretary of state. The committee submitted a report to the 19th Canadian Ministry for the creation of a loan fund to aid the development of the Canadian film industry. The proposal was approved in October 1965, and legislation, the Canadian Film Development Corporation Act of 1966–67, for its creation was introduced in June 1966, before being approved on March 3, 1967, establishing the Canadian Film Development Corporation.

Denys Arcand, Gilles Carle, Jacques Godbout, Gilles Groulx, and Clément Perron criticized the NFB and its productions in articles written for the Cité Libre. Juneau stated that the articles were a watershed moment in the NFB's history. The men were reprimanded by Roberge. Many employees left the NFB following the reprimands including Michel Brault, Carle, Bernard Gosselin, Groulx, and Arthur Lamothe.

Juneau left the NFB in March 1966, and worked at the Canadian Radio-television and Telecommunications Commission before becoming president of the CBC. Roberge created the positions of Assistant Government Film Commissioner, held by Grant McLean and Roland Ladouceur, Director of Production for English, held by Julian Biggs, and French, held by Marcel Martin, productions.

=== Grant McLean administration ===
Roberge resigned as commissioner on April 1, 1966, and declined to be involved with the selection of his successor. Grant was appointed as the acting commissioner by Judy LaMarsh. LaMarsh was slow on the selection of a permanent commissioner. Grierson supported Grant's selection, but also put forward Newman. Hugo McPherson was selected to become commissioner in April 1967.

Maurice Lamontagne selected Gordon Sheppard, a film producer, to review Canada's cultural policy and his report, Sheppard's Special Report on the Cultural Policy and Activities of the Government of Canada, was critical of the NFB. It criticized the NFB's preference for aesthetics and cultural films instead of informational films. The report called for a reduction in NFB productions and that it should eventually be entirely replaced by private production. The External Affairs Ministry criticized Sheppard stating that he was serving his own interests.

Prior budgets were created by having the commissioner meet with the secretary of state and representatives of the Treasury before being voted on in parliament, but it was changed to having members of the Standing Committee on Broadcasting, Films and Assistance to the Arts question the commissioner and Grant was the first commissioner to go through it.

There had been multiple attempts by the NFB to create a film school and the idea received support from the External Affairs Ministry and the Sheppard Report. However, the Treasury Board of Canada had rejected efforts to fund its creation. Grierson was invited by Grant to report on the possibility of creating a film school. Grierson supported creating a school, if the External Affairs Ministry recommended that production be reduced to free up creative teachers.

The CBC terminated its contracts with the NFB in 1966. The CBC and NFB's relations soured due to the NFB's demand that no commercials be played during their films and the NFB charging $10,000–$15,000 for 30 minute films while a commercial network had received it for $800. The CBC and NFB also co-produced The Ernie Game and Waiting for Caroline which went overbudget by $50,000 and $200,000 respectively.

=== McPherson administration ===
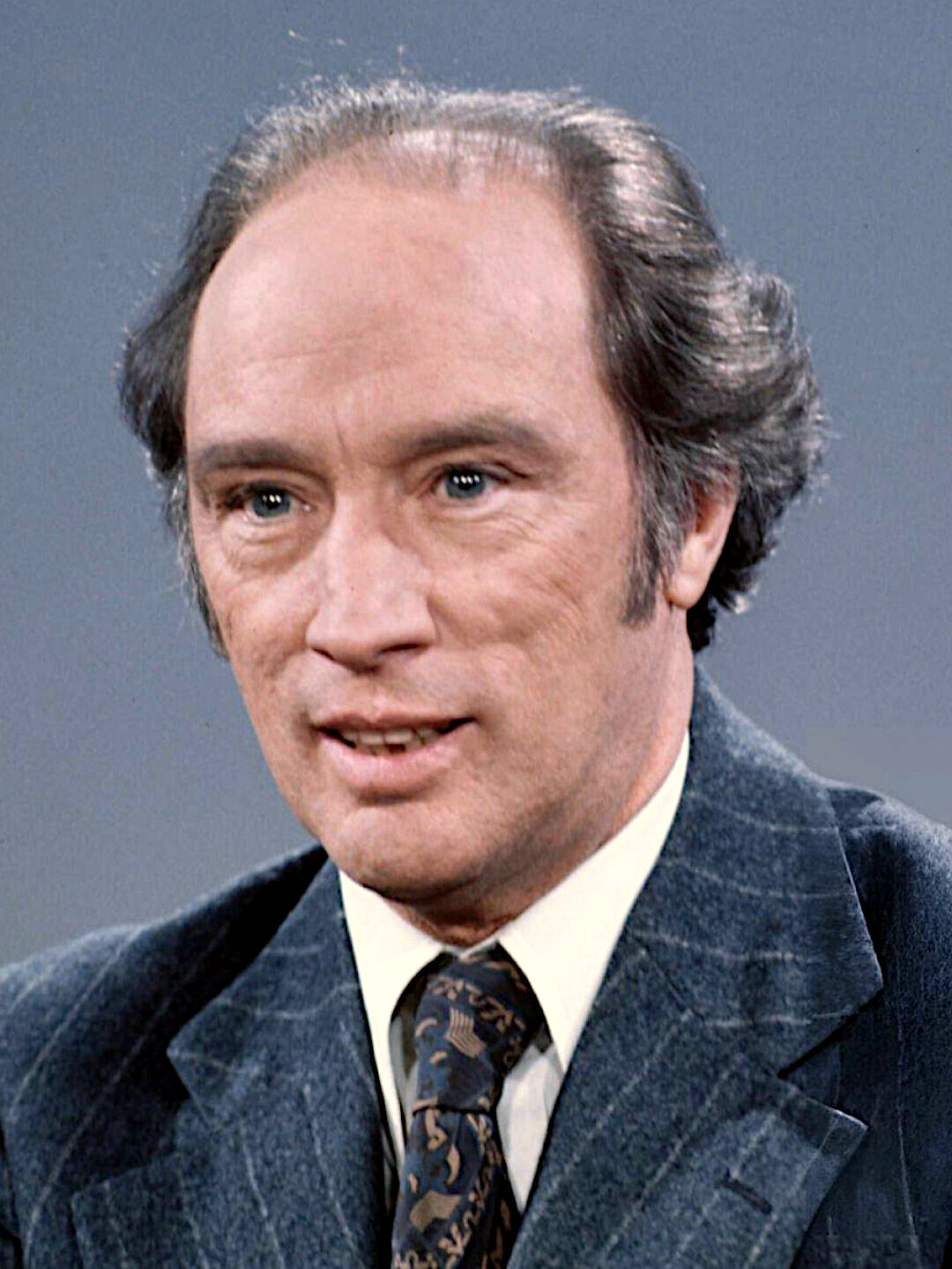
The NFB suffered from budgetary problems during Pierre Trudeau's tenure as prime minister

In 1967, the Treasury Board limited the NFB's expenditures to $10 million and over the course of two years it was forced to pay for built-in higher salary costs and another salary increase due to an agreement with the SGCT union using existing funds. McPherson asked Pelletier to allow the NFB to spend over $500,000 more than its budget in order to avoiding firing 10% of the NFB's employees, and later asked the Cabinet and Treasury for more funding, but was unsuccessful. McPherson later stated that after his failure with the Treasury he waited for the perfect time to resign.

In 1969, an agreement was reached between the CBC and NFB in which the CBC would be allowed to air commercials during NFB programs. Revenue from sponsored films declined from $2.2 million to $1.6 million by August 1969.

McPherson announced that 10% of the employees would be laid off by 1 January 1970. The employees formed a Crisis Committee under John Howe's leadership and film production was stopped although a strike was not officially called. The committee suggested allowing government sponsors to choose between using the NFB or private companies, allowing outsiders to pay for NFB technical services, creating a unit system where 5-15 people would work together, and creating fees for distribution. McPherson supported the idea of distribution fees and thought that it was the only viable option for the NFB. Pelletier approved the NFB charging $3–12 per day for its films, but they were later removed as being in violation of anti-inflation guidelines. Fees would be instituted in 1988.

The Treasury had granted $1 million, $250,000 less than what was requested, in August to cover NFB's salary increases, but McPherson was not informed as ministers hoped he would institute larger budget cuts. An additional $500,000 was free due to lowered production following the Crisis Committee's formation. 63 layoffs were proposed and it was reduced by 17 due to union opposition.

The first usage of videotape by the NFB occurred in 1967, when Claude Jutra and Robert Forget used it for research with children.

=== Newman and Lamy administrations ===
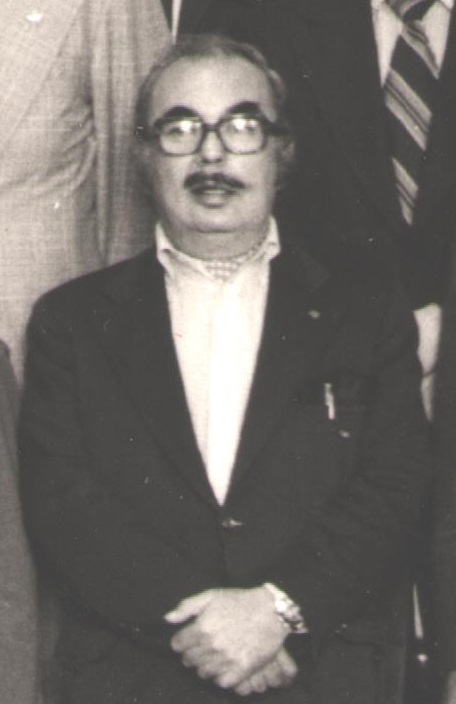
Sydney Newman was NFB commissioner from 1970 to 1975

Newman, a former NFB director who spent the previous twelve years working on television shows in the United Kingdom, was selected to replace McPherson as commissioner in 1970, and he selected André Lamy as his assistant commissioner. Faulkner opposed Newman and worked to have Newman not reappointed in July 1975, and he was replaced by Lamy.

Lamy criticized multiple French productions, such as Cotton Mill, Treadmill, 24 heures ou plus, and Un pays sans bon sens!, as being too biased or separatist and were ordered to not be released in 1970. Robin Spry was initially denied the ability to film the events of the October Crisis by the English side of the NFB, but was given permission by the French side and the footage was turned into Reaction: A Portrait of a Society in Crisis and Action: The October Crisis of 1970 with some elements censored by Newman. French films banned under Newman's tenure were later released during Lamy's tenure.

Kathleen Shannon attempted to have a division created to focus on films made by and about women due to the coming International Women's Year. Newman and Robert Verrall supported Shannon's attempt to get a $1.3 million budget for a women's department, but it was rejected by the Treasury. Verrall gave Shannon permission to organize Studio D, the first publicly funded feminist film-production unit in the world, in 1974. However, there would be no French version of Studio D until the formation of Studio B in 1986. Studio D produced 125 films before its closure in 1996.

In 1970, Pelletier called for the creation of a Canadian Film Commission, made up of private and governmental interests, but it was opposed by the NFB, CBC, CFDC, and Library and Archives Canada. However, they did agree to form the Advisory Committee on Film as an ad hoc committee. Pelletier later proposed the Global Film Policy in which the NFB would regionalize and share sponsored productions with the private sector. Pelletier's successor, Hugh Faulkner, replaced the Global Film Policy with the Capital Cost Allowance in which investors could get a 100% tax deduction.

Faulkner proposed to shift the responsibility of sponsored films to the Department of Supply and Services and only give the NFB 30% of the work. However, he was replaced by John Roberts during a shuffling of the cabinet in September 1976. Roberts believed that the CCA resolved the funding problems for the private industry, accepted Lamy's recommendations for interactions with private companies, and declined to have the Department of Supply and Services manage sponsored films. However, 70% of the sponsored work were given to private companies by the end of Lamy's tenure.

A $500,000 budget cut and 2.5% decrease in salaries over two years were implemented in 1975, after initially being threatened with a $1 million cut, as part of a government attempt to save $1 billion. The Public Service Staff Relations Board ruled in 1977 that 99% of the freelance workers at the NFB were employees and the board of governors later recommended the firing of sixty-five people. Federal budget cuts caused Roberts to plan for the NFB's budget to decrease by 10% between 1979 and 1981.

=== Domville administration ===
Lamy left the NFB and the board of Governors selected James de Beaujeu Domville, who served as deputy film commissioner for seven years, after four months. Domville selected François N. Macerola, the director of French production, as his deputy commissioner. Domville offered to continue on as commissioner for another term after 1984, and his demands were accepted by the board of governors, but chose to leave after Francis Fox declined to accept or deny his renewal.

After the 1979 election Prime Minister Joe Clark changed the ministry responsible for the NFB from the Secretary of State, which managed it since 1963, to the Minister of Communications, then led by David MacDonald. MacDonald supported giving 80% of the sponsored work to private companies and that the NFB only make films that the private companies could not. Domville offered a three-year phase out of NFB doing sponsored work during a meeting with representatives of the Canadian Film and Television Association and Association des Producteurrs de Films du Quebec in 1979. He stated that "sponsored film had become a monkey on the back of English production".

Encyclopædia Britannica reportedly offered to buy the NFB for $100 million (equivalent to $410,500,000 in 2025) in 1979.

Fox organized the Applebaum-Hébert Committee under the leadership of Louis Applebaum and Jacques Hébert in 1981. It was the first review of cultural institutions and policies since the Massey Commission. The committee released its report on 15 November 1980, in which it called for the elimination of the government's role in producing and distributing cultural products and to instead give it to the private industry. They believed that the private industry could create an export market to compete with the United States. Fox later decided to allow the NFB continue producing content, but ended their involvement in sponsored content, along with their executive production of sponsored work given to private companies.

=== Macerola administration ===
Domville suggested Patrick Watson as his successor and the board of governors accepted him, but Fox declined as he wanted his Film and Video Policy to be considered by the cabinet first. Macerola became the acting commissioner of the NFB. Watson was instead appointed to the board of governors and became president of the CBC in 1989. Macerola left the NFB six months before the expiration of his term in order to join Lavalin in December 1988, and Joan Pennefather became the acting commissioner.

Macerola oversaw a reorganization of the NFB which decreased its distribution offices from twenty-six to twelve and international offices to three. The NFB attempted to create a television channel in the 1980s. Marcel Masse gave them permission to attempt to create Young Canada Television (Tèlè-Jeunesse Canada), but the channel failed in June 1987, as the Department of Communications withdrew its financial support leading to the banks to also withdraw their support. Macerola's Five-Year Operational Plan saw the permanent staff of the NFB fall from 1,085 in 1982, to 728 in 1989, and the amount of work given to freelancers by 1986 was 67% for English productions and 57% for French productions.

The NFB was given an honorary Oscar at the 61st Academy Awards in honour of its fiftieth anniversary.

=== Pennefather administration ===
In 1990, Wil Champbell and Roger Trottier asked Graydon McCrea about holding a meeting about the participation of First Nations people in the film industry. The NFB aided in the organization of the Aboriginal Film and Video Symposium in April 1991. The Aboriginal Film and Video Art Alliance (AFVAA) was formed as a result of this meeting. Studio One, meant for First Nations filmmakers, was formed on 9 June 1991, with a $250,000 budget and under McCrea's supervision. The studio's first film, Tlaxwes Wa: Strength of the River, was released in 1995. However, funding for the studio was ended on 31 March 1996.

=== Modern ===
As of 2025, the NFB has made 14,000 productions. It has received 78 Oscar nominations, with its 38 nominations for animated shorts placing it behind Disney and MGM in that category.

== Productions ==
=== Animation ===
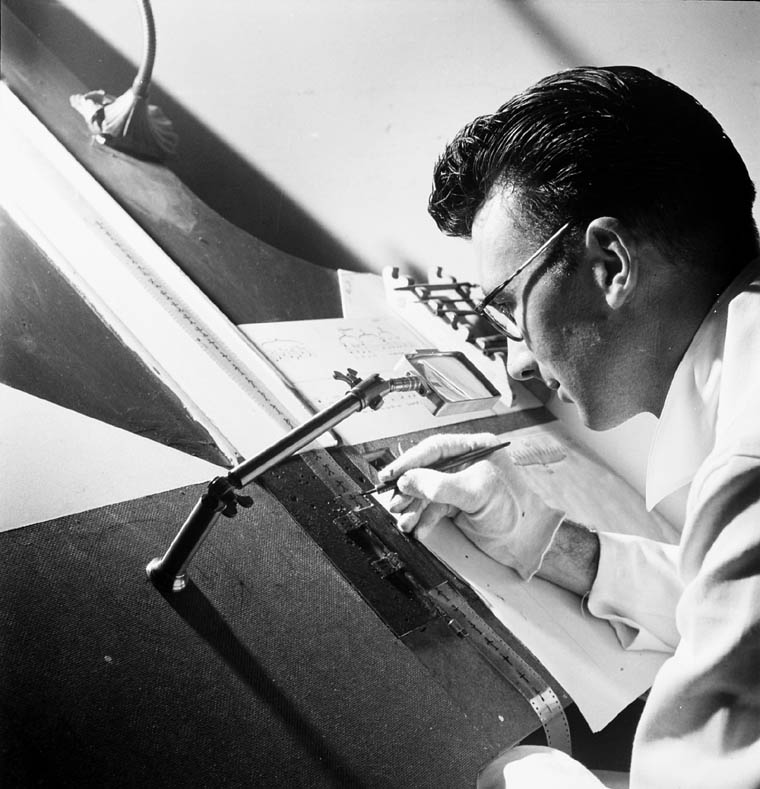
McLaren drawing on film, 1944

Norman McLaren founded the NFB's animation unit in 1942, and had George Dunning, René Jodoin, Wolf Koenig, Jean-Paul Ladouceur, Evelyn Lambart, Colin Low, Grant Munro, and Robert Verrall working there within a decade of its creation. Jodoin organised the NFB's French animated studio in 1966.

During Derek Lamb's leadership of the English animation studio produced multiple critical acclaimed works, including the Academy Award-winning Every Child. Lamb resigned in 1982, and was replaced by Doug McDonald, whose tenure was criticized by animators such as David Fine's statement that "Norman McLaren would be turning in his grave if he knew how the place was being run".

The NFB's computer animation program was suspended due to budget cuts although the NFB's French animated studio created Peter Foldes's Metadata in 1971, and Hunger in 1973. The NFB returned to computer animation in the 1980s. The NFB licensed the SANDDE, a system that allows for hand-drawn animation in 3D spaces, from the IMAX Corporation; Subconscious Password (2013) was produced using this system.

As of 2012, the NFB is the only studio with an pinscreen animation screen.

McLaren used the stop motion technique of pixilation for Neighbours. The NFB released StopMo Studio, an app that allowed people to create their own stop motion films, in 2012. The 3D printing of sets and puppets for stop motion was first used by a NFB film in Bone Mother. The Girl Who Cried Pearls (2025) used hand-made puppets in contrast to the standard usage of 3D printing.

=== Children ===
Children were rarely featured in NFB films in the early 1940s due to a focus on documentaries related to military efforts. In 1943, Grierson increased film production aimed at children for the purpose of education. The Ti-Jeans series, first produced in the 1950s, was the most booked non-theatrical NFB film up until the 1990s. and Ti-Jean Goes Lumbering (1953) was the second most popular NFB title according to a 1960 survey.

Films about the socialization of children were produced by the NFB in the 1950s. Generational gaps and the sexual revolution were depicted in 1966 productions The Merry-Go-Round, The Game, and The Shattered Silence. NFB productions aimed at children mainly focused on the adults until the 1970s. Sexual Abuse of Children: A Time for Caring (1979) was the first NFB film to cover child sexual abuse and the number of films covering child abuse grew in the 1980s.

=== Documentary ===
==== Cinéma vérité and Direct Cinema ====
In the post-war era, the NFB became a pioneer in new developments in documentary film. The NFB played a key role in both the cinéma vérité and direct cinema movements, working on technical innovations to make its 16 mm synchronized sound equipment more light-weight and portable—most notably the "Sprocketape" portable sound recorder invented for the film board by Ches Beachell in 1955. Influenced by the work of Henri Cartier-Bresson, the NFB's Studio B production unit experimented with cinema verite in its 1958 Candid Eye series. Candid Eye along with such NFB French-language films as The Snowshoers (Les Raquetteurs) (1958) have been credited as helping to inspire the cinéma vérité documentary movement. Other key cinéma vérité films during this period included Lonely Boy (1961) and Ladies and Gentlemen... Mr. Leonard Cohen (1965).

==== Challenge for Change/Societé Nouvelle ====
Running from 1967 to 1980, Challenge for Change and its French-language equivalent Societé Nouvelle became a global model for the use of film and portable video technology to create community-based participatory documentary films to promote dialogue on local issues and promote social change. Over two hundred such films were produced, including 27 films about Fogo Island, Newfoundland, directed by Colin Low and early NFB efforts in Indigenous filmmaking, such as Willie Dunn's The Battle of Crowfoot (1968).

===== Indian Film Crew =====
The Indian Film Crew was an early effort in First Nations filmmaking at the NFB, through its Challenge for Change program, initially proposed by the associate director of the CYC, Jerry Gambill, according to Noel Starblanket. George Stoney was brought in as the first executive producer of Challenge for Change. It was jointly sponsored by the Company of Young Canadians and the Department of Indian Affairs. Barbara Wilson, Tom O'Connor, Noel Starblanket, Roy Daniels, Morris Isaac, Willie Dunn, and Mike Kanentakeron Mitchell were on Canada's first all-Indigenous production unit, making groundbreaking work that helped galvanize Indigenous movements across the continent.

==== Giant-screen cinema ====
NFB documentarians played a key role in the development of the IMAX film format, following the NFB multi-screen experience In the Labyrinth, created for Expo 67 in Montreal. The film was the centrepiece of a $4.5 million pavilion, which attracted over 1.3 million visitors in 1967, and was co-directed by Roman Kroitor, Colin Low and Hugh O'Connor, and produced by Tom Daly and Kroitor. After Expo, Kroitor left the NFB to co-found what would become known as IMAX Corporation, with Graeme Ferguson and Robert Kerr. The NFB continued to be involved with IMAX breakthroughs at subsequent world's fairs, with NFB director Donald Brittain directing the first-ever IMAX film Tiger Child for Expo 70 in Osaka, and with the NFB producing the first full-colour IMAX-3D film Transitions for Expo 86 in Vancouver and the first 48 fps IMAX HD film Momentum for Seville Expo '92.

==== Alternative drama ====
In the 1980s, the National Film Board also produced a number of "alternative drama" films, which combined documentary and narrative fiction filmmaking techniques. Generally starring non-professional actors, these films used a documentary format to present a fictionalized story and were generally scripted by the filmmakers and the cast through a process of improvisation, and are thus classified as docufiction.

The alternative drama films were The Masculine Mystique (1984), 90 Days (1985), Sitting in Limbo (1986), The Last Straw (1987), Train of Dreams (1987), Welcome to Canada (1989) and The Company of Strangers (1990).

=== Interactive ===
==== Works ====
As of March 2013, the NFB devotes one quarter of its production budget to interactive media, including web documentaries. The NFB is a pioneer in interactive web documentaries, helping to position Canada as a major player in digital storytelling, according to transmedia creator Anita Ondine Smith, as well as Shari Frilot, programmer for Sundance Film Festival's New Frontier program for digital media.

Welcome to Pine Point received two Webby Awards while Out My Window, an interactive project from the NFB's Highrise project, won the IDFA DocLab Award for Digital Storytelling and an International Digital Emmy Award.

Rob McLaughlin is the executive producer responsible for NFB English-language digital content and strategy, based in the Woodward's Building in Vancouver. Jeremy Mendes is an interactive artist producing English-language interactive works for the NFB, whose projects include a collaboration with Leanne Allison (Being Caribou, Finding Farley) on the webdoc Bear 71.

===== Virtual reality =====
The NFB is also recognized as a leader in virtual reality, with works such as the Webby Award-winning The Unknown Photographer, Way to Go and Cardboard Crash.

==== Platforms ====
In January 2009, the NFB launched its online Screening Room, NFB.ca, offering Canadian and international web users the ability to stream hundreds of NFB films for free as well as embed links in blogs and social sites. By mid-2013, the NFB's digital platforms had received approximately 41 million views.

In October 2009, the NFB launched an iPhone application that was downloaded more than 170,000 times and led to more than 500,000 film views in the first four months. In January 2010, the NFB added high-definition and 3D films to the over 1400 productions available for viewing online. The NFB introduced a free iPad application in July 2010, followed by its first app for the Android platform in March 2011. When the BlackBerry PlayBook launched on April 19, 2011, it included a pre-loaded app offering access to 1,500 NFB titles. In January 2013, it was announced that the NFB film app would be available for the BlackBerry 10, via the BlackBerry World app store.

In September 2011, the NFB and the Montreal French-language daily Le Devoir announced that they would jointly host three interactive essays on their websites, ONF.ca and ledevoir.com. The NFB is a partner with China's ifeng.com on NFB Zone, the first Canadian-branded web channel in China, with 130 NFB animated shorts and documentary films available on the company's digital platforms. NFB documentaries are also available on Netflix Canada.

In April 2013, the NFB announced that it was "seeking commercial partners to establish a subscription service for Internet television and mobile platforms next year. The service would be available internationally and would feature documentaries from around the world as well as the NFB’s own catalogue." As of April 2015, NFB.ca offered VOD films from partners Excentris and First Weekend Club along with NFB productions, with over 450 English and French VOD titles scheduled to be added in 2015.

=== Indigenous ===
On June 20, 2017, the NFB announced a three-year plan entitled "Redefining the NFB's Relationship with Indigenous Peoples" that commits the organization to hiring more Indigenous staff, designating 15% of its production spending for Indigenous works and offering cross-cultural training to all employees. The plan also sees the NFB building on its relationships with Canadian schools and organizations to create more educational materials about Indigenous peoples in Canada.

One of the most notable filmmakers in the history of the NFB is Alanis Obomsawin, an Abenaki director who will be completing her 50th film with the NFB in 2017.

==== Inuit film and animation ====
In November 2011, the NFB and partners including the Inuit Relations Secretariat and the Government of Nunavut introduced a DVD and online collection entitled Unikkausivut: Sharing Our Stories, makes over 100 NFB films by and about Inuit available in Inuktitut and other Inuit languages, as well as English and French.

In November 2006, the National Film Board of Canada and the Inuit Broadcasting Corporation announced the start of the Nunavut Animation Lab, offering animation training to Nunavut artists. Films from the Nunavut Animation Lab include Alethea Arnaquq-Baril's 2010 digital animation short Lumaajuuq, winner of the Best Aboriginal Award at the Golden Sheaf Awards and named Best Canadian Short Drama at the imagineNATIVE Film + Media Arts Festival.

==== First Stories and Second Stories ====
In 2005, the NFB introduced its "First Stories" program for emerging Indigenous directors from Alberta, Saskatchewan and Manitoba. Twelve five-minute films were produced through the program, with four from each province. First Stories was followed by "Second Stories," in which three filmmakers from the previous program—Gerald Auger, Tessa Desnomie and Lorne Olson—were invited back to create 20 minute films.

==== Wapikoni Mobile ====
The NFB was a founding partner in Wapikoni Mobile, a mobile film and media production unit for emerging First Nations filmmakers in Quebec.

=== Photography ===
The Still Photography Division of the Canadian Government Motion Picture Bureau was transferred to the NFB on 8 August 1941; this occurred two months after the rest of the organization was absorbed into the NFB. The Still Photography Division of the Wartime Information Board was acquired by the NFB in 1943. Nicholas Morant, George Hunter, and Ronny Jaques were employed by the Still Photography Division during World War II.

In 1944, the Still Photography Division started charging a below-standard fee for reproductions. The Commercial and Press Photographers' Association of Canada accused the division of unfair competition due to this. In 1946, the NFB changed its policies to match the standard rate of $2.50 for newspapers and $5 for magazines.

The 1950 National Film Act included photography under the NFB's purview. Employment in the division fell by 20% from 1945 to 1946, and declined from 70 employees in 1945, to 22 by 1952. The division had to rely on freelancers. The division was placed under Technical Services in 1951. The photography division did not participate in the move to Saint-Laurent due to objections from the External Affairs, Trade and Commerce, the Travel Bureau, and other federal agencies that relied on it for promotional services.

Photography/Photographie: Canada 1967, featuring 149 photographs from 52 photographers was the first annual photography exhibition organized by the division. The $554,500 budget for Canada: A Year of the Land, a 260 image photobook produced by 76 photographers for the Canadian Centennial, was greater than the budget for the overall division. For Expo 67, the division produced the People Tree, a six-storey spherical structure, at the Canadian Pavilion. The $158,500 budget for the Call Them Canadians photobook was almost equal to the division's $172,876 budget for 1966.

In 1971, two-thirds of the photography division's employees were moved to Information Canada and its photographic archive was diverted into the Library and Archives Canada and Photothèque, the commercial image bank of Information Canada. However, Information Canada was eliminated in 1975, and the images in Photothèque were returned to the NFB in 1976. In 1985, the division was turned into the Canadian Museum of Contemporary Photography. 250,000 photos were created by the division during its existence, with 25,000 being taken during World War II.

=== Women ===
The NFB has been a leader in films by women, with the world's first publicly funded women's film's studio, Studio D, followed subsequently by its French-language equivalent, Studio des femmes. Beginning on March 8, 2016, International Women's Day, the NFB began introducing a series of gender parity initiatives.

==== Studio D ====
In 1974, in conjunction with International Women's Year, the NFB created Studio D on the recommendation of long-time employee Kathleen Shannon. Shannon was designated as executive director of the new studio—the first government-funded film studio dedicated to women filmmakers in the world—which became one of the NFB's most celebrated filmmaking units, winning awards and breaking distribution records.

Notable films produced by the studio include three Academy Award-winning documentaries I'll Find a Way (1977), If You Love This Planet (1982) and Flamenco at 5:15 (1983), as well as Not a Love Story (1982) and Forbidden Love: The Unashamed Stories of Lesbian Lives (1992). Studio D was shut down in 1996, amidst a sweeping set of federal government budget cuts, which impacted the NFB as a whole.

As of March 8, 2016, researchers and librarians at the University of Calgary announced an archival project to preserve records of Studio D.

== Gender parity initiatives ==
On March 8, 2016, NFB head Claude Joli-Coeur announced a new gender-parity initiative, with the NFB committing that half of all its production spending will be earmarked for films directed by women. The following year, the NFB announced that it also plans to achieve gender balance by 2020 in such creative positions as editing, scriptwriting, musical composition, cinematography and artistic direction. As of 2017, 53% of its producers and executive producers are women, as well as half of its administrative council.

While it is claiming success, directing credits and budget shares have barely changed. In 2016–2017, 44 per cent of NFB productions were directed by women (compared to 51 per cent directed by men and five per cent by mixed teams). Budget-wise, 43 per cent of production funds were given to projects led by women (vs. 40 per cent to projects directed by men and 15 per cent to ones overseen by mixed teams). In 2018–2019, 48% of NFB works were directed by women (38% by men and 14% by mixed teams), and 44% of the NFB production budget was allocated to works created by women (41% for works by men and 15% for works by mixed teams). Production personnel are between 10 and 25%.

== Training ==
NFB training programs include:

=== Animation ===
Hothouse, a program for emerging animators that marked its tenth anniversary in 2015. Notable Hothouse alumni include Academy Award nominee Patrick Doyon, part of its 2006 edition. Cinéaste recherché(e) is a similar program for French-language emerging animators. Past graduates include Michèle Cournoyer, who took part in the program's 9th edition in 1989.

=== Theatrical documentaries ===
A collaboration with the Canadian Film Centre on a theatrical documentary development program. First launched in January 2009, the program has led to the production of Sarah Polley's Stories We Tell, Yung Chang's The Fruit Hunters and Su Rynard's The Messenger. In May 2015, the CFC and NFB announced a new version of the program entitled the NFB/CFC Creative Doc Lab.

== Structure ==
=== Branches and studios ===
As of 2015, the NFB is organized along the following branches:

- Director General, Creation and Innovation: René Bourdages. The heads of the NFB's English and French production branches are Michelle van Beusekom and Michèle Bélanger, respectively.
- Finance, Operations and Technology: Director General: Luisa Frate
- Marketing and Communications: Director General: Jérôme Dufour
- Human Resources: Director General: François Tremblay

With six regional studios in English Program:

- Digital Studio in Vancouver, headed by Executive Producer Rob McLaughlin
- Animation Studio based in Montreal, headed by Executive Producer Michael Fukushima and Producers Maral Mohammadian and Jelena Popović
- Atlantic Centre based in Halifax, headed by Executive Producer John Christou and Producer Paul McNeill
- Quebec Centre based in Montreal, also headed by Executive Producer John Christou
- Ontario Centre based in Toronto, headed by Executive Producer Anita Lee and Producer Lea Marin
- North West Centre based in Edmonton, headed by Executive Producer David Christensen and Producer Bonnie Thompson
- BC & Yukon Studio based in Vancouver, headed by Executive Producer Shirley Vercruysse.
- With small satellite offices in Winnipeg and St. John's.

And four regional studios in French Program:

- Interactive Studio in Montreal, headed by Executive Producer Hugues Sweeney
- Ontario and West Studio based in Toronto, headed by Executive Producer: Jacques Turgeon
- Quebec Studio based in Montreal, also headed by Executive Producer: Jacques Turgeon
- French Animation and Youth Studio based in Montreal, headed by Executive Producer: Julie Roy and Producer: Marc Bertrand
- Studio Acadie/Acadia Studio based in Moncton, headed by Executive Producer: Jacques Turgeon and Producer: Maryse Chapdelaine
- René Chénier, formerly head of French Animation, is Executive Producer of Special Projects

=== Former studios and departments ===
As part of the 2012 budget cuts, the NFB announced that it was forced to close its Toronto Mediatheque and Montreal CineRobotheque public facilities. They ceased to operate as of September 1, 2012. In September 2013, the University of Quebec in Montreal (Université du Québec à Montréal) announced that it had acquired the CineRobotheque for its communications faculty.

== People ==
=== Government Film Commissioners ===
As stipulated in the National Film Act of 1950, the person who holds the position of Government Film Commissioner is the head of the NFB. As of 2022, the 17th commissioner of the NFB is Suzanne Guèvremont, who will also be the chairperson for a five-year term. Before Guèvremont, the 16th commissioner of the NFB was Claude Joli-Coeur, who led the NFB for nearly nine years and was the agency's longest serving commissioner joining first in 2003 under Jacques Bensimon. Jolie-Coeur also served as interim commissioner from 2006 to 2007 under Tom Perlmutter.

==== Past NFB Commissioners ====
- John Grierson, 1939–1945
- Ross McLean, 1945–1947 (interim), 1947–1950
- W. Arthur Irwin, 1950–1953
- Albert W. Trueman, 1953–1957
- Guy Roberge, 1957–1966
- Grant McLean, 1966–1967 (interim)
- Hugo McPherson, 1967–1970
- Sydney Newman, 1970–1975
- André Lamy, 1975–1979
- James de Beaujeu Domville, 1979–1984
- François N. Macerola, 1984–1988
- Joan Pennefather, 1988–1994
- Sandra M. Macdonald, 1995–2001
- Jacques Bensimon, 2001–2006
- Tom Perlmutter, 2007 to 2013
- Claude Joli-Coeur, 2014 - 2019 (first term), 2019 - 2022 (second term)
- Suzanne Guèvremont, 2022–present

==== Notable NFB filmmakers, artisans and staff ====
- Michel Brault
- Donald Brittain
- Richard Condie
- John Grierson, NFB founder
- Guy Glover, producer
- Co Hoedeman
- René Jodoin, French animation founder
- Kalle Lasn
- Arthur Lipsett
- Colin Low
- Bill Mason
- Norman McLaren, animation founder
- Grant Munro
- Alanis Obomsawin
- Gudrun Parker
- Ishu Patel
- Eldon Rathburn, composer
- Terence Macartney-Filgate
- Marcel Carrière
- Tom Daly
- Roman Kroitor
- Wolf Koenig
- Ryan Larkin
- Tanya Ballantyne
- Anne Claire Poirier
- William Greaves
- Stanley Jackson
- Boyce Richardson
- Michael Spencer

== Awards ==
Over the years, the NFB has been internationally recognized with more than 5000 film awards. In 2009, Norman McLaren's Neighbours was added to UNESCO's Memory of the World Programme, listing the most significant documentary heritage collections in the world.

== Controversy ==
In addition to Neighbours, other NFB productions have been the source of controversy, including two NFB productions broadcast on CBC Television that criticized the role of Canadians in wartime and led to questions in the Senate of Canada.

In the early 1970s, two Quebec political documentaries, Arcand's On est au coton and Gilles Groulx's 24 heures ou plus, were initially withheld from release by the NFB due to controversial content.

The Kid Who Couldn't Miss (1982) cast doubt on the accomplishments of Canadian World War I flying ace Billy Bishop, sparking widespread outrage, including complaints in the Senate subcommittee on Veterans' Affairs.

A decade later, The Valour and the Horror outraged some when it suggested that there was incompetence on the part of Canadian military command, and that Canadian soldiers had committed unprosecuted war crimes against German soldiers. The series became the subject of an inquiry by the Senate.

Other controversial productions included the 1981 film Not a Love Story: A Film About Pornography, a 1981 Studio D documentary critiquing pornography that was itself banned in the province of Ontario on the basis of pornographic content. Released the following year, If You Love This Planet, winner of the Academy Award for Best Live Action Short, was labelled foreign propaganda under the Foreign Agents Registration Act of 1938 in the United States.

== NFB on TV ==
The NFB is a minority owner of the Canadian digital television channel Documentary Channel. The NFB-branded series Retrovision aired on VisionTV along with the French-language Carnets ONF series on APTN. Moreover, in 1997, the American cable channel Cartoon Network created a weekly 30-minute show called O Canada, which specifically showcased a compilation of NFB-produced works; the segment was later discontinued in favour of Adult Swim.

== Logo ==
1995–2003 logo

The Board's logo consists of a standing stylized figure (originally green) with its arms wide upward (designed similarly to the CBS logo). The arms are met by an arch that mirrors them. The round head in between then resembles a pupil, making the entire symbol appear to be an eye with legs. Launched in 1968, the logo symbolized a vision of humanity and was called "Man Seeing / L'homme qui voit". It was designed by Georges Beaupré. It was updated in 2003 by the firm of Paprika Communications.

== See also ==
- Cinema of Canada
- Cinema of Quebec
- From NFB to Box-Office
- Documentary Organization of Canada

== Works cited ==
=== Books ===
- Beard, William; White, Jerry, eds. (2002). North of Everything: English-Canadian Cinema Since 1980. The University of Alberta Press. ISBN 0-88864-398-5.
- Clandfield, David (1987). Canadian Film. Oxford University Press. ISBN 0195405811.
- Dupuis, Chris (2024). Greyson, John (ed.). Winter Kept Us Warm. McGill–Queen's University Press. doi:10.1515/9780228020349. ISBN 9780228020349.
- Evans, Gary (1991). In the National Interest: A Chronicle of the National Film Board of Canada from 1949 to 1989. University of Toronto Press. ISBN 0802027849.
- Jones, David (1981). Movies and Memoranda: An Interpretative History of the National Film Board of Canada. Canadian Film Institute. ISBN 0919096212.
- Khouri, Malek (2007). Filming Politics: Communism and the Portrayal of the Working Class at the National Film Board of Canada, 1939-46. University of Calgary Press. ISBN 9781552381991.
- Low, Brian (2002). NFB Kids: Portrayals of Children by the National Film Board of Canada, 1939-1989. Wilfrid Laurier University Press. doi:10.51644/9780889207202. ISBN 9780889207202.
- Magder, Ted (1993). Canada's Hollywood: The Canadian State and Feature Films. University of Toronto Press.
- Morris, Peter, ed. (1978). Embattled Shadows: A History of Canadian Cinema 1895-1939. McGill–Queen's University Press. ISBN 9780773560727.
- Payne, Carol (2013). The Official Picture: The National Film Board of Canada's Still Photography Division and the Image of Canada, 1941-1971. McGill–Queen's University Press. doi:10.1515/9780773588943. ISBN 9780773588943.
- Pendakur, Manjunath (1990). Canadian Dreams & American Control: The Political Economy of the Canadian Film Industry. Garamond Press. ISBN 0920059937.

=== Journals ===
- Brégent-Heald, Dominique (2012). "Vacationland: Film, Tourism, and Selling Canada, 1934-1948". Canadian Journal of Film Studies. 21 (2). University of Toronto Press: 27–48. doi:10.3138/cjfs.21.2.27. JSTOR 24411793.

=== News ===
- Blair, Iain (June 4, 2012). "NFB pushes Canadian artists in edgy direction". Variety. Archived from the original on June 14, 2025.
- Doherty, Mike (August 8, 2015). "Shaun the Sheep leads the stop-motion animation revival". Canadian Broadcasting Company. Archived from the original on June 14, 2025.
- Giardina, Carolyn (July 23, 2013). "Siggraph: Oscar Winner Chris Landreth Shows His New Short 'Subconscious Password'". The Hollywood Reporter. Archived from the original on June 14, 2025.
- Lang, Jamie (June 8, 2025). "Preserving the Past and Powering the Future of Canadian Animation: Inside the NFB and Telefilm's Industry-Leading Support Strategies". Variety. Archived from the original on June 14, 2025.
- Robinson, Chris (June 19, 2025). "The Offbeat Production Methods Of The NFB's Stop-Motion Film 'The Girl Who Cried Pearls'". Cartoon Brew.

=== Web ===
- "Photo Collections". Library and Archives Canada. Archived from the original on January 28, 2007.
