= Honkytonk Films =

French production and film software company

- Founder: Arnaud Dressen; Benoît de Vilmorin
- Headquarters: Paris, France
- Key people: Arnaud Dressen (Producer); Guillaume Urjewicz (Interactive producer)
- Products: New media production, creative software
- Website: http://www.honkytonk.fr/

Honkytonk Films is a new media production company based in Paris, France. They were founded in 2007 by Arnaud Dressen and Benoit de Vilmorin. From 2007 to 2016, the company developed, produced, and distributed multimedia documentaries on all platforms (TV, Internet and mobile) worldwide. Their web documentaries, such as Journey to the End of Coal, received the 2009 Civil Society of Multimedia Authors's award for multimedia work.

The company developed and distributed Klynt, an creative software dedicated to interactive editing for new media content producers. It was designed to create interactive rich media stories on the Internet. It includes an interactive media editor (text, photo, vidéos, audio, graphics and any type of web content) and a HTML5 rich media player (ready to be embedded on any web page). Honkytonk's Journey to the End of Coal and The Big Issue were both made using Klynt.

In 2016, Honkytonk Films made the decision to stop producing documentaries and other media, and instead pivoted to focus their efforts on developing Wonda VR, a virtual reality aimed at providing a creative and immersive learning experience.

== Productions ==
Title	Year	Notes
Journey to the End of Coal	2008	web documentary directed by Samuel Bollendorff and Abel Ségrétin
The Big Issue	2009	web documentary directed by Samuel Bollendorff and Olivia Colo
The Challenge	2009	web documentary directed by Laetitia Moreau
iROCK	2010	web documentary directed by Lionel Brouet

== Awards ==
- Sheffield Doc/Fest 2009, special mention for innovation awards, The Big Issue.
- Prix Europa 2009, special mention in emerging media awards, The Big Issue.
- Les Grands Prix Civil Society of Multimedia Authors 2009 in new technology class, digital interactive artwork award, Journey to the End of Coal.
