= Welcome to Pine Point =

Interactive web documentary

- Website type: Web documentary
- Available in: English
- Creators: Paul Shoebridge; Michael Simons
- Website: http://interactive.nfb.ca/#/pinepoint
- Commercial: no
- Registration: no
- Launched: 2011

Welcome to Pine Point is a 2011 interactive web documentary by Michael Simons and Paul Shoebridge, collectively known as The Goggles, formerly creative directors of Adbusters magazine. The website explores the memories of residents from the former mining community of Pine Point, Northwest Territories, as well as how we remember the past. The project was produced in Vancouver by the National Film Board of Canada.

== Production history ==
Simons and Shoebridge had planned to do a book about the decline of photo albums when they happened upon a website called Pine Point Revisited, created by ex-Pine Point resident Richard Cloutier. Cloutier, who had been known as something of a bully in the community when younger, had since developed multiple sclerosis and was dedicating himself to keeping the memory of the now-vanished community alive.

Simons had a personal connection with Pine Point, having visited it at the age of nine to attend an ice hockey tournament. They met with Cloutier who put them in contact with other former residents, known as "Pine Pointers." Welcome to Pine Point was their first interactive media project.

Welcome to Pine Point was produced by Adam Neilson, with Rob McLaughlin as executive producer.

== Multimedia ==
Welcome to Pine Point combines photographs, sound and video clips, interviews, music, and voice over from several characters.

== Soundtrack ==
The Besnard Lakes wrote and performed the soundtrack for Welcome to Pine Point. The collaboration came about when band member Jace Lasek was approached by Simons, a high school friend. The soundtrack includes their reworking of the Trooper single, "We're Here For a Good Time (Not a Long Time)." On September 20, 2011 the group released their score for Welcome to Pine Point as a twelve-inch EP entitled You Lived in the City.

== Release ==
The creators presented the web documentary, using pre-recorded sound for the narration, at the International Documentary Film Festival Amsterdam. In May 2011, the web documentary won two Webby Awards, for Documentary: Individual Episode in the Online Film & Video category and Netart in the Websites category. As of June 2011, Welcome to Pine Point was viewed over 150,000 times. It also won the Sheffield Innovation Award sponsored by BT Vision at Sheffield Doc/Fest in June, also in 2011. On December 7, 2011, Welcome to Pine Point was named Best in Web series at the Digi Awards in Toronto, formerly known as the Canadian New Media Awards.
