= François N. Macerola =

Canadian lawyer and film executive (1942–2018)

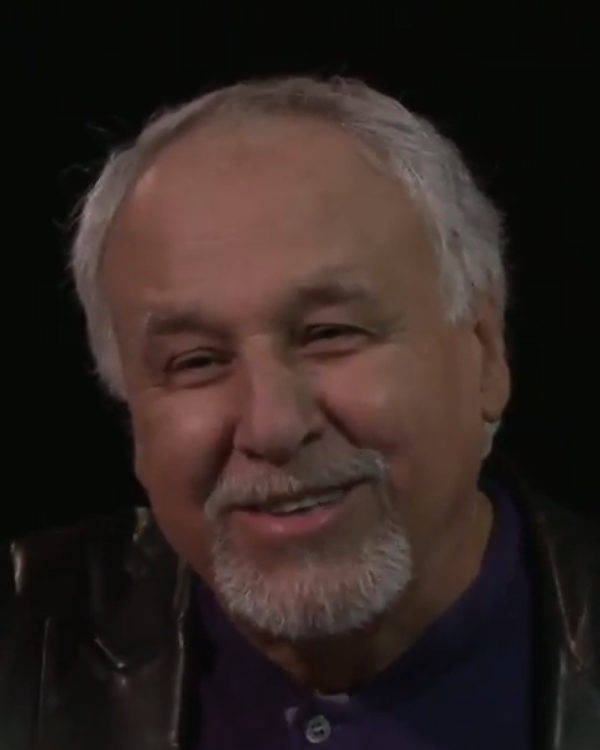
- Born: January 31, 1942; Montreal, Quebec, Canada
- Died: November 8, 2018 (aged 76)
- Education: Université de Montréal
- Occupations: Lawyer, film executive
- Years active: 1976–2018

François N. Macerola (January 31, 1942 – November 8, 2018) was a Canadian lawyer and film executive. He held a number of senior positions with the National Film Board of Canada and Telefilm Canada.

== Early life ==
Macerola was born in Montreal, Quebec. He studied at the Université de Montréal, gaining his BA degree there in 1963, and then becoming a Bachelor of Civil Law in 1970. He was called to the Bar of Quebec in 1971, and began practising law with the firm Malouf, Pateras, Macerola.

== Career ==
Macerola became involved in the film industry in 1976, when he was appointed director of the French Program at the National Film Board (NFB). During this time, he tried to make sure that the predominantly freelance film-makers of the French Program could not claim the status of permanent employees, which helped to save the NFB money, as more salaried employees would mean less budget available for actual film production. There was also a concern at the NFB that if a core regular team of French Canadian film-makers was allowed to build up, they could cause political problems with Quebec nationalism.

In April 1979, he was promoted to the position of assistant film commissioner, making him James de Beaujeu Domville's deputy in the running of the NFB. Domville stepped down from his role in January 1984 and Macerola succeeded him, initially on an interim basis but from May 1984 as the official new Government Film Commissioner. One of his first tasks as commissioner was to develop a new five-year plan for the future of the NFB, after Minister of Communications Francis Fox tasked the organisation with becoming "a world centre of excellence in production of films and videos" and "a national training and research centre in the art and technique of film and video".

Macerola dealt with the controversy surrounding the 1982 docudrama The Kid Who Couldn't Miss, about the life of fighter pilot Billy Bishop. Although produced before Macerola had become the commissioner, in 1985 he was called before a sub-committee of the Senate to answer charges that the film inaccurately portrayed Bishop's career and achievements. Macerola refused to withdraw the film from circulation, although a caption was later added to the start of it to clarify that it was a drama-documentary and not a pure documentary.

In December 1988, six months before his contract was due to come to an end, Macerola stepped down as commissioner of the NFB to join Lavalin Communications. In 1991 he left Lavalin to take up a position as vice president of the board of directors of the film company Malofilm Distribution Limited. He remained with Malofilm until 1995, when he joined the Canadian government's film and television funding agency Telefilm Canada. He served as the organisation's executive director from 1995 until 2001, and was chairman of the board from 2000 until 2002. He then worked as a lawyer for the Canadian government before joining the Cirque du Soleil, as the head of its legal department. In this position he was mainly responsible for safeguarding the circus's intellectual property rights.

== Personal life ==
Macerola had two children, Stéphanie and Louis. He died on the morning of November 8, 2018, at the age of 76 in Montreal, Quebec.

== Footnotes ==
Cultural offices
Preceded by James de Beaujeu Domville	Government Film Commissioner and Chairperson of the National Film Board of Canada; 1984–1988	Succeeded by Joan Pennefather
