= Carolle Brabant =

Canadian film executive

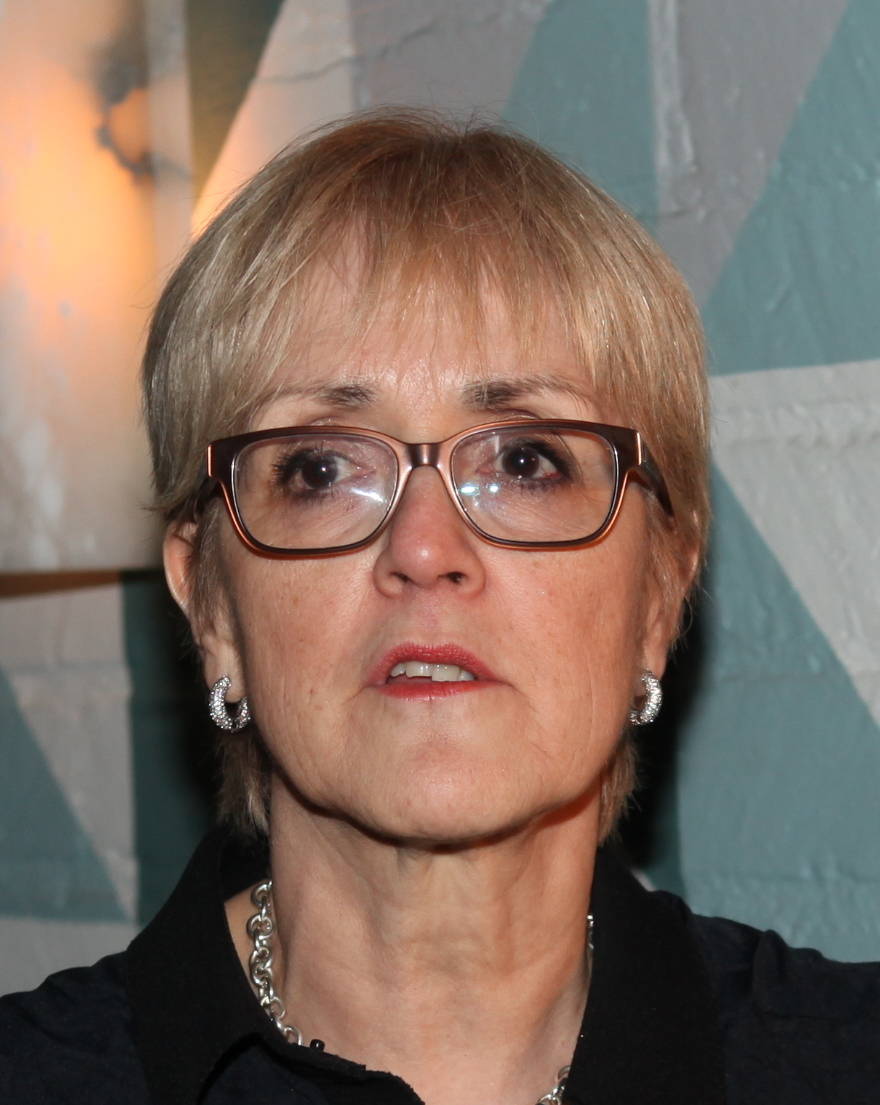
- Carolle Brabant at a 2012 CFC event in LA
- Born: Montreal, Quebec

Carolle Brabant CM (born in Montreal, Quebec) is the former executive director of Telefilm Canada. Brabant was named to the position by Canadian Heritage Minister James Moore in March 2010. She was succeeded by Jean-Claude Mahé in March 2018.

== Early life and career ==
Brabant received her bachelor's in accounting from the Université du Québec à Chicoutimi. Subsequently, in 1986, she became a chartered accountant and joined Samson Bélair Deloitte and Touch in Chicoutimi.

== Career ==
In 1990, Brabant decided to return to her native town to take up the position of auditor at Telefilm Canada. She has remained with the organization to this day, holding a number of different positions.

As a more than 20-year veteran of Telefilm's senior management, she has headed up the finance, information technology, human resources, and administration sectors as well as is directly responsible for the implementation and management of the service agreement between Telefilm Canada and the Canadian Television Fund. In 2004, Brabant was named interim executive director of Telefilm, a post she held from July 2004 to January 2005 when Wayne Clarkson was named to the position.

In 2005, she was named the director of Administration and Corporate Services and remained there until March 2010 when she was named to executive director.

== Appointment as executive director ==
On 9 March 2010 Moore named Brabant to succeed Wayne Clarkson as the executive director of Telefilm Canada. She is both the first woman to take the position in the organization's history, as well as the first senior manager to be named to the position. Although she was not well known within the industry before her appointment, she is said to be "forward-looking and a person with vision" by chairman of the board Michel Roy.

== Other honours ==
Brabant has been a lecturer at the Université du Québec à Chicoutimi (UQAC), and a jury member for the Canadian Institute of Chartered Accountants and the L'Ordre des comptables agréés du Québec's Uniform Final Examination for chartered accountants. Brabant is on the board of directors of the Fondation Docteur Philippe-Pinel and received her M.B.A from the École des hautes etudes commerciales de Montréal (HEC Montréal) in 1997. Most recently, Brabant was named one of the "13 Female Power-Players Who Rule the World" by The Hollywood Reporter and the excellence in leadership award from Canadian Women in Communications at the CWC's 2012 awards gala in Ottawa.

Brabant was made a member of the Order of Canada in 2021.

== See also ==
- Cinema of Quebec
- Cinema of Canada
