= James de Beaujeu Domville =

Canadian theatre producer (1933–2015)

James de Beaujeu Domville (23 June 1933 – 2 April 2015) was a French-born Canadian theatrical producer and administrator. In addition to his theatrical work, Domville served in several important Canadian cultural positions, including five years as Commissioner of the National Film Board of Canada (NFB).

Domville was born in Cannes on the French Riviera to a Canadian father and an American mother. He was a great-grandson of Canadian politician James Domville on his father's side and a grandson of Dutch American novelist Edgar Evertson Saltus through his socialite mother Elsie Welsh Saltus. He attended Selwyn House School and Trinity College School and studied at the University of Fribourg in Switzerland and then at McGill University in Montreal, Quebec, Canada, from which he gained a Bachelor of Civil Law degree.

His first theatre work was the production of the satirical musical My Fur Lady. He was co-writer and producer of My Fur Lady, which was a success, being produced at the Stratford Festival and then touring Canada from 1957 to 1958. Following on from this, Domville co-founded a theatre production company, Quince Productions. He co-produced Jubilee and Spring Thaw over the following few years, and was also involved in theatre design, helping to plan the Fredericton Playhouse and the National Theatre School of Canada.

From 1964 until 1968, he served as the National Theatre School's Director-General. He was then the Executive Director of the Théâtre du Nouveau Monde from 1968 until 1972. He also sat on the Advisory Arts Panel of the Canada Council from 1968 until 1972, serving as the panel's chairman for the final three of those years.

It was in 1972 that he first became involved with the National Film Board, being appointed its Assistant Director of English Production. He became Executive Producer in charge of the NFB's drama film output in 1974, and then in September 1975 was appointed Assistant Film Commissioner by André Lamy. In his time at the NFB he pursued his enthusiasm for underwater diving by directing two films about the subject, Sub-Igloo and Arctic IV, and co-producing an evening of programming on the theme for the Canadian Broadcasting Corporation, which included a live transmission from the bottom of Resolute Bay. In 1977, he was awarded the Queen Elizabeth II Silver Jubilee Medal.

In January 1979, Domville succeeded Lamy as Government Film Commissioner and Chair of the NFB. He later claimed that this was the only job he had ever really wanted. He faced a time of cutbacks and austerity at the NFB, but received praise for changing NFB policy in supporting the Canadian film industry by allowing private companies, rather than the NFB, to undertake the majority of sponsored film production. It was also during Domville's time in charge of the NFB that its Studio D unit produced the controversial documentary features Not a Love Story (1981) and If You Love This Planet (1982). Following disagreements with the government, and despite feeling that it had been the most interesting phase of his career, Domville left his role at the NFB in January 1984.

He died of melanoma in Singapore on 2 April 2015 at the age of 81.

== Footnotes ==
Cultural offices
Preceded by André Lamy	Government Film Commissioner and Chairperson of the National Film Board of Canada; 1979-1984	Succeeded by François N. Macerola
