= Rob McLaughlin =

Canadian journalist and film producer

- Occupation(s): Journalist, film producer
- Employer: National Film Board of Canada

Rob McLaughlin is a Canadian journalist and film producer who is currently the executive producer of the National Film Board of Canada's Digital Studio in Vancouver. McLaughlin was announced as the head of the NFB studio in May 2016, having previously served as Director of Digital Content and Strategy at the NFB from 2008–2011.

From 2011 until his return to the NFB, he was the Regional Vice President of Editorial for all of Postmedia's newspapers in Western Canada as well as was Editor-in-Chief of two newspapers in Saskatchewan, the Saskatoon StarPhoenix and the Regina Leader-Post.

In his first stint with NFB, McLaughlin was responsible for the strategy and production of many of its pioneering interactive documentary projects including Waterlife, Welcome to Pine Point, Bear 71, God's Lake Narrows and The Test Tube With David Suzuki.

Prior to joining the NFB, McLaughlin worked at the Canadian Broadcasting Corporation as a director of digital programming. From 2000 to 2005 he was the executive producer of CBC Radio 3 and managed content creation for the group’s collection of web sites and radio programs. CBC Radio 3 won a Webby Award for Best Broadband site in 2003 and the People Choice Webby Awards in the Radio and Broadband categories.

McLaughlin had first worked with the NFB under the company name Subject Matter Inc. and collaborated with Katerina Cizek to develop the NFB website Filmmaker in Residence, which won the Webby Award for Best Documentary Series in 2008.
