= Telefilm Canada =

Crown corporation involved in film and video

- Company type: Crown corporation
- Industry: Film
- Founded: 1967; 59 years ago
- Headquarters: Montreal, Quebec, Canada
- Products: Supporting the audiovisual industry in Canada
- Website: www.telefilm.ca

Telefilm Canada is a Canadian Crown corporation that supports Canada's audiovisual industry. Headquartered in Montreal, Telefilm Canada provides services to the Canadian audiovisual industry with four regional offices in Vancouver, British Columbia; Toronto, Ontario; Montreal, Quebec; and Halifax, Nova Scotia. The primary mandate of the corporation is to finance and promote Canadian productions through its various funds and programs.

== Purpose ==
As one of the principal instruments for supporting Canada's audiovisual industry, Telefilm Canada's primary mandate is to provide support and promote all stages of screen-based content through its various funds and programs. It also fosters the commercial, cultural, and industrial success of Canadian productions and to stimulate demand for those productions both at home and abroad. It also administers the programs of the Canada Media Fund.

The organization is also responsible for choosing Canada's annual submission to the Academy Awards for the Best International Feature Film award.

== Coproductions ==
Telefilm Canada administers the Canadian government's coproductions, while supporting Canadian filmmakers and their international counterparts to coproduce films and television programs that enjoy the status of national productions in each of the respective countries.

== Operations ==
Headquartered in Montreal, Telefilm Canada provides bilingual services to its clients through four offices located in Vancouver, Toronto, Montreal and Halifax.

The Atlantic Regional office, in operation since 1984 from Halifax, services New Brunswick, Newfoundland, Nova Scotia and Prince Edward Island.

The Quebec Regional office is located in the Montreal head office and serves the province of Quebec.

The Ontario Regional office, in operation since 1968 from Toronto, serves both Ontario and Nunavut.

The Western Regional office, in operation since 1984 from Vancouver, serves the Western provinces of British Columbia, Alberta, Manitoba, Saskatchewan, the Northwest Territories and the Yukon.

== History ==
=== Creation ===
In 1967, the Canadian government founded the Canadian Film Development Corporation (CFDC), allocating $10 million in support of the country's feature film industry. Michael Spencer was named the first executive director of the CFDC, which by then included offices in Montreal and Toronto.

=== 1970s ===
By 1976, the Canadian government had increased the CFDC's budget to $25 million annually, at which point it decided to finance the corporation with an annual parliamentary appropriation. Spencer was replaced by Michael McCabe in May 1978. Notable films produced with the agency's support included Goin' Down the Road (1970), The Apprenticeship of Duddy Kravitz (1974), Shivers (1975), Why Shoot the Teacher (1977), In Praise of Older Women (1978).

=== 1980s ===
The early 1980s sees the CFDC's budget increased yet again and the creation of the Canadian Broadcast Program Development Fund to revitalize Canadian television programming. At the time, approximately 85% of all prime time programming on Canadian television is imported from other countries—namely the US. Under the direction of André Lamy, in 1984 the CFDC is renamed "Telefilm Canada" to better reflect the organization's full range of activities in both the film and television industries.

With the creation of the Feature Film Fund aimed at supporting feature films by Canadian filmmakers and the Feature Film Distribution Fund that makes credit lines available to Canadian distributors, Telefilm Canada takes a central role in the development and growth of Canadian cinema around the world.

=== 1990s ===
Now under the executive direction of François Macerola, the Canada Television and Cable Production Fund is created. The Fund is a private-public partnership between the federal government of Canada and the cable and satellite television industry, with Telefilm administering the Equity Investment component of the Fund. By the end of the 1990s, in 1998, Telefilm Canada creates a five-year, $30-million multimedia fund, aptly-named The Multimedia Fund, with which to support Canadian work in the digital age. The Fund helps Canadians in multimedia to compete effectively in the new technologies arena.

=== 2000s ===
With the new millennium, the Canadian government implemented a new Canadian Feature Film Policy, From Script to Screen, that effectively created the Canada Feature Film Fund (CFFF) to be managed by Telefilm Canada.

Beginning April 1, 2001, with an annual budget of $100-million, the CFF's primary objective is to build larger audiences in Canada and abroad for Canadian feature films with improved distribution and marketing. Also that year, Telefilm Canada announces guidelines for the Canada New Media Fund, replacing the Multimedia Fund. Budgets grow from $6 million, to $9 million, and now sit at $14 million annually. The latter half of the decade brings about other changes for Telefilm.

In 2005, the minister of Canadian Heritage announced a new collaboration between the organization and the Canadian Television Fund and, with it, renewed funding of CA$100 million for Canadian television programming. While the Board of the Canadian Television is responsible for the governance of all programs, Telefilm heads up the administration and delivery of the CTF programs.

=== 2010s and 2020s ===
The 2012 Canadian federal budget cut funding for the National Film Board of Canada and Telefilm Canada by 10%. Today, following a new four-year plan, Telefilm has made stimulating demand for Canadian screen-based content one of its top priorities.

In April 2022, Christa Dickenson announced that she would step down as executive director and CEO effective September 9, 2022.

== Key people ==
=== Executive directors ===
- Michael Spencer – March 1969 to April 1978
- Michael McCabe – May 1978 to April 1980
- Pierre Thibault – April to July 1980, acting executive director
- André Lamy – August 1980 to June 1985
- Peter Pearson – July 1985 to October 1987
- Judith McCann – October to December 1987, acting executive director
- Michèle Fortin – December 1987 to May 1988, acting executive director
- Pierre DesRoches – June 1988 to June 1994
- Peter Katadotis – June 1994 to March 1995, acting executive director
- François Macerola – March 1995 to November 1998
- Peter Katadotis – November to December 1998, acting executive director
- François Macerola – January 1999 to July 2001
- Johanne St-Arnauld – July 2001 to January 2002, acting executive director
- Richard Stursberg – January 2002 to July 2004
- Carolle Brabant – July 2004 to January 2005, acting executive director
- Wayne Clarkson – January 2005 to January 2010
- Carolle Brabant – March 2010 to March 2018
- Jean-Claude Mahé – March to July 2018, acting executive director
- Christa Dickenson – July 2018 to 2023
- Julie Roy – 2023 to present

== Chairpersons of the board ==
- Georges-Émile Lapalme – February 1968 to November 1969
- Gratien Gélinas – November 1969 to February 1978
- Michel Vennat – March 1978 to May 1981
- David Silcox – September 1981 to December 1982
- Claude Morin – January to March 1983, chaired board meetings as vice-chair
- Ed Prévost – April 1983 to June 1986
- Jean Sirois – July 1987 to April 1988
- Edmund C. Bovey – May 1988 to April 1990
- Harvey Corn – July 1990 to June 1993
- André Provost – June to July 1993, acting chair
- Robert Dinan – July 1993 to July 1998
- Laurier LaPierre – July 1998 to July 2001
- François Macerola – July 2001 to February 2002
- Charles Bélanger – February 2002 to February 2007
- Felix (Fil) Fraser – February to October 2007, interim chair
- Michel Roy – October 2007 to present

== Regional agencies ==
=== Provincial ===
- Alberta Media Fund (Alberta)
- Creative BC Film Commission (British Columbia)
- Manitoba Film & Music (Manitoba)
- Department of Tourism, Heritage and Culture (New Brunswick)
- PictureNL (Newfoundland and Labrador)
- Screen Nova Scotia (Nova Scotia)
- Ontario Media Development Corporation (Ontario Creates)
- Northern Ontario Heritage Fund (Northern Ontario)
- Prince Edward Island Film Production Fund
- Société de développement des entreprises culturelles (Quebec)
- Creative Saskatchewan

=== Territorial ===
- NWT Film Commission (Northwest Territories)
- Nunavut Film Development Corporation (Nunavut)
- Yukon Media Development (Yukon)

== See also ==
- Cinema of Canada
- Cinema of Quebec
