= Jacques Bensimon =

Jacques Bensimon

Jacques Bensimon CM (August 26, 1943 – August 26, 2012) was a public film and television director, producer and executive in Canada, working primarily with the National Film Board of Canada (NFB) and TFO, the French-language network of TVOntario. From 2001 until 2006, he was president of the Cinémathèque québécoise in Montreal.

== Career ==
In 1967, Bensimon began working at the NFB, as a scriptwriter, editor, director and producer. From 1986 to 2000 he was managing director of TFO, where he helped establish partnership and co-production agreements with major distributors all over the world such as the BBC, Arte and France Télévisions. Bensimon was named Government Film Commissioner and Chairperson of the NFB on April 26, 2001 for a five-year term, which was extended for six months and ended on December 17, 2006.

== Honours ==
Bensimon was named a Member of the Order of Canada in 2005, received an honorary doctorate in Letters from York University in Toronto and, in 1998, was named "Chevalier des Arts et des Lettres" from the French Government for what he accomplished at TFO.

== Personal life ==
He was born in Agadir, Morocco, grew up in Montreal after moving to Canada with his family (parents and three sisters) as a teen, and completed his film studies at New York University in New York City. Bensimon worked in Toronto and Montreal. He died in Montreal on August 26, 2012, his 69th birthday.

Cultural offices
Preceded by Sandra M. Macdonald	Government Film Commissioner and Chairperson of the National Film Board of Canada; 2001-2006	Succeeded by Tom Perlmutter
