= Sandra M. Macdonald =

Canadian film and television executive

Sandra M. Macdonald is a Canadian film and television executive. She has also held important administrative positions with the Canadian Radio-television and Telecommunications Commission (CRTC) and the National Film Board of Canada (NFB).

Macdonald was born in Prince Edward Island, and earned degrees in philosophy and communications from St. Francis Xavier University, Prince of Wales College and the University of Ottawa. Following her time at university, she worked as a theatrical producer and designer. She then became a partner in an independent film and television production company.

In the 1980s she worked in various capacities for the Canadian government's Department of Communications, before in 1990 she joined the CRTC as its Director-General of Television. In this position, she was responsible for licensing television stations and dealing with Canadian content regulations. In 1992 she became President of the Canadian Film and Television Production Association (CFTPA), dealing with government bodies and industry regulators to represent independent production companies in Canada.

In April 1995, Macdonald was appointed as the Government Film Commissioner, the Chairperson of the National Film Board. Following a report by a parliamentary committee into the role of the NFB, delivered in January 1996, Macdonald had to oversee a major restructuring of the NFB. Ancitipating a reduction in the NFB's budget of $20 million over the following three years, Macdonald oversaw the closure of the Board's own in-house sound stage and film laboratory; a move to using freelance film directors rather than NFB staff members; the almost-total abandonment of drama film production, and an overall loss of 180 staff positions. There were also positive artistic moments, however; in 1999 the NFB saw two of its animations, My Grandmother Ironed the King's Shirts and When the Day Breaks, nominated for the Academy Award for Best Animated Short Film. In May 2000, the Association of Professional Executives of the Public Service of Canada presented Macdonald with their Leadership Award for her "revitalization" of the NFB.

Macdonald left the NFB in June 2001. At around this time, the CFTPA presented her with its Jack Chisholm Award, in recognition of her lifetime's achievements in the Canadian film and television industry. In September 2002 she became the President of the Canadian Television Fund, responsible for administering government investment in Canadian television production.

Cultural offices
Preceded by Joan Pennefather	Government Film Commissioner and Chairperson of the National Film Board of Canada; 1995-2001	Succeeded by Jacques Bensimon
