= Wayne Clarkson =

Canadian film executive

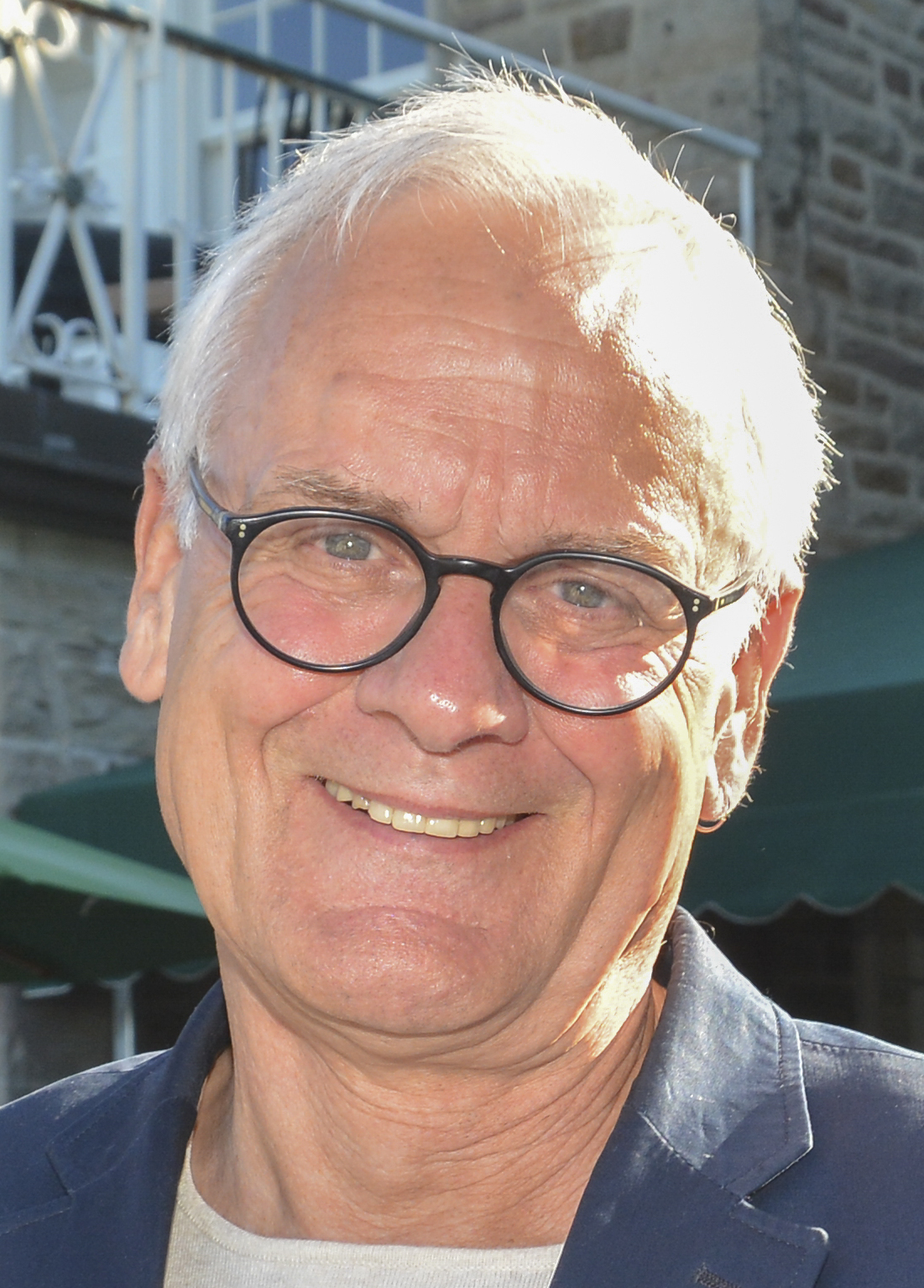
- Born: 1943 (age 82–83)
- Occupation: film festival director,
- Years active: 1970s-present

Wayne Clarkson (born 1943) is a retired Canadian film industry executive, who has been a key figure in Canadian film institutions such as the Festival of Festivals, the Canadian Film Centre and Telefilm Canada.

Clarkson began his career working for the Canadian Film Institute, including as director of its FilmExpo series and the Ottawa International Animation Festival. He joined the Festival of Festivals as director in 1978, remaining with the festival until becoming head of the Ontario Film Development Corporation in 1985. His stint as head of the OFDC was credited with kicking off the Toronto New Wave of new young film directors in the late 1980s and early 1990s.

In 1991 he succeeded Peter O'Brian as executive director of the Canadian Film Centre. He remained in that role until being appointed head of Telefilm Canada in 2005, and remained with Telefilm until being succeeded by Carolle Brabant in 2010.

In 2002, the Toronto Film Critics Association awarded Clarkson its Clyde Gilmour Award for distinguished contributions to the film industry in Canada.

His son Wyeth Clarkson is a film director and producer.
