= The Kid Who Couldn't Miss =

- Directed by: Paul Cowan
- Written by: John Gray; Eric Peterson
- Produced by: Adam Symansky
- Starring: William Hutt; Eric Peterson
- Cinematography: Paul Cowan
- Edited by: Paul Cowan; Sidonie Kerr
- Music by: Ben Low
- Production company: National Film Board of Canada (NFB)
- Release date: 3 March 1983 (Canada)
- Country: Canada
- Languages: English; French
- Budget: $334,560

The Kid Who Couldn't Miss is a 1983 docudrama film directed by Paul Cowan. Produced by the National Film Board of Canada, it combines fact and fiction to question fighter pilot Billy Bishop's accomplishments during World War I, featuring excerpts from John MacLachlan Gray's play Billy Bishop Goes to War. The film specifically questions accounts of Bishop's solo mission to attack a German aerodrome on June 2, 1917, for which he was awarded a Victoria Cross, and suggests the event was imaginary and that Bishop exaggerated his own accomplishments.

In one particularly contentious scene, his mechanic claims that the damage to his fighter was confined to a small circle in a non-critical area, implying that Bishop had landed his aircraft off-field, shot the holes in it, and then flown home with claims of combat damage. In reality, his mechanic was his biggest supporter in this issue and the scene was entirely fictitious. The mechanic insisted that Bishop had not fabricated the damage.

== Production ==
Paul Cowan became interested in making a movie about Bishop while making Stages. He decided to investigate Bishop because of Billy Bishop Goes to War. While researching for the film Cowan discovered recordings of pilots in Bishop's squadron who criticized Bishop and learned that Bishop's kills were never confirmed. The film had a budget of $334,560 (equivalent to $945,521 in 2025).

== Reaction ==
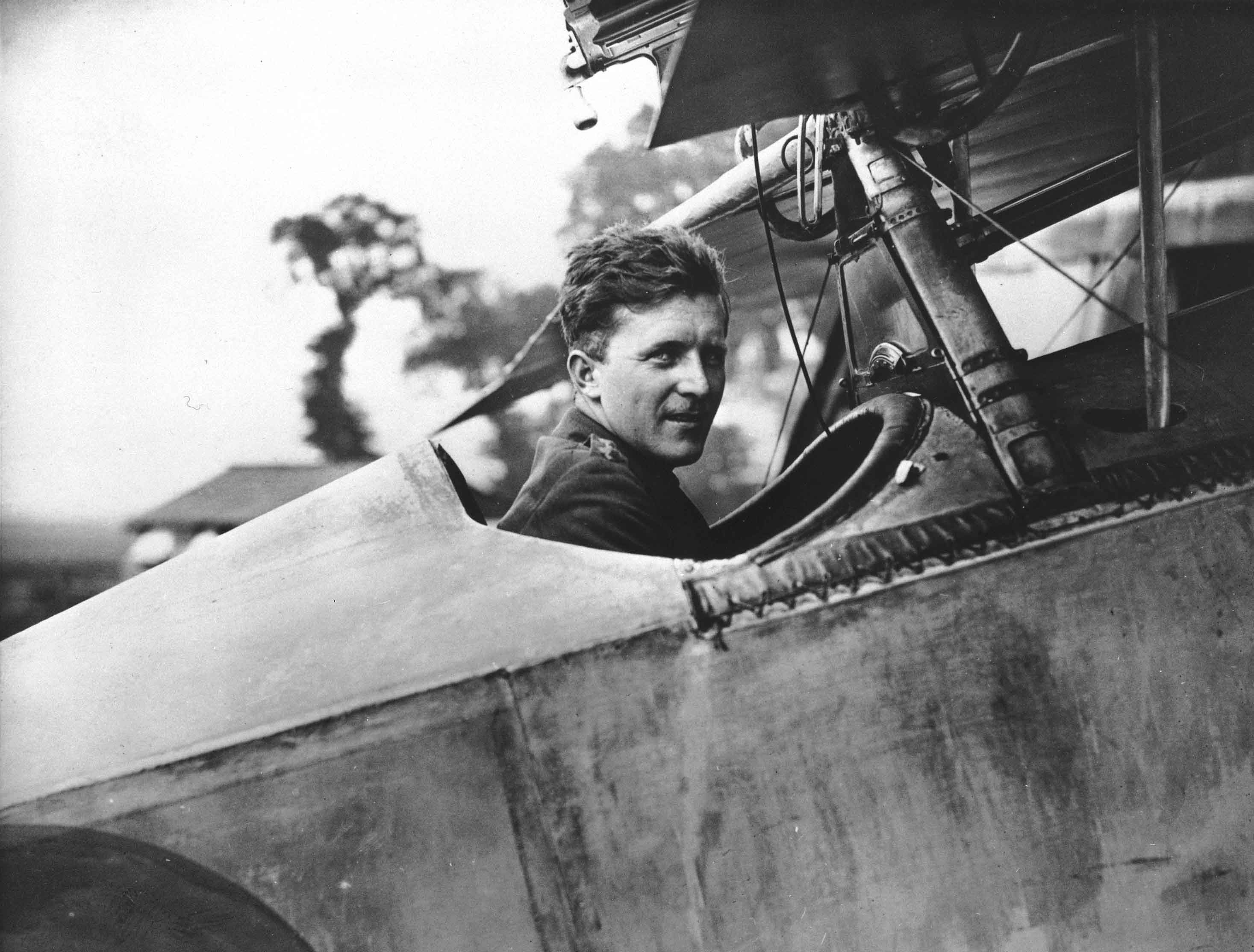
Bishop in the cockpit of his Nieuport 17, c. August 1917.

After years of controversy over Bishop's record, mainly because very few of his claimed victories were witnessed by anyone else or could be confirmed from surviving German records, the show led to an inquiry by the Canadian government in 1985. The Standing Senate Committee on Social Affairs, Science and Technology discredited the documentary, saying it was an unfair and inaccurate portrayal of Bishop. The NFB's Commissioner, François N. Macerola, was called before the committee, but refused to accede to their demands that he withdraw the film from circulation.

3,000 letters were sent criticizing the movie.

Canadian veterans' groups were outraged by the insinuation, and Cowan received many irate letters, "He got inundated by thousands of furious letters, rumblings in the Senate subcommittee on Veterans' Affairs, and demands that the government cut off funding to the NFB."

Cowan and NFB commissioner François N. Macerola appeared before the Senate of Canada in 1985. Members of the senate criticized the film as damaging to Canada's national image and pride by having documentary and drama combined. Macerola refused to withdraw the film, but his recommendation to have the film labeled as a docudrama was accepted. The Senate made another inquiry into the film in 1986.

Minister of Communications Flora MacDonald told Macerola "Get rid of the problem. I'm fed up with it." in 1987. Clifford Chadderton, president of The War Amps, wanted the film to be re-edited, but accepted Macerola's compromise to create another film.

Chadderton created the film The Billy Bishop Controversy to counter the bias he and other veterans perceived in the NFB film. Released in 1986, it attempts to demonstrate that Cowan and the NFB did not properly research the historical records, and reached faulty conclusions about Bishop. The Kid Who Couldn't Miss also led Chicago native, and Bishop fan, Albert Lowe to create a website (www.billybishop.net, now defunct) devoted to the fighter pilot. Lowe complained about the characterization of Bishop in the film, and commented that "That year Mr. Paul Cowan, with $514,007.00 of Canadian Taxpayer's money, did one of the foulest deeds possible without committing some form of violence."

The film has been withdrawn from distribution in 1998 by the National Film Board of Canada due to concerns that it would not generate enough revenue to pay for the renewal rights for its archival footage, which was required by copyright laws. This has been discussed as a case of censorship by copyright. Kirwan Cox called this ironic as "the public lost access to this film not because of political censorship, but because of copyright censorship."

== Works cited ==
- Evans, Gary (1991). In the National Interest: A Chronicle of the National Film Board of Canada from 1949 to 1989. University of Toronto Press. ISBN 0802027849.
