= Cotton Mill, Treadmill =

- French: On est au coton
- Directed by: Denys Arcand
- Produced by: Marc Beaudet; Guy Coté; Pierre Maheu
- Cinematography: Alain Dostie
- Edited by: Pierre Bernier
- Production company: National Film Board of Canada
- Release date: October 13, 1976
- Running time: 173 minutes
- Country: Canada
- Language: French
- Budget: $152,266

Cotton Mill, Treadmill (French: On est au coton) is a documentary film directed by Denys Arcand, about the conditions of workers in the textile industry in Quebec. Despite being made in 1970, the film was held back by the National Film Board of Canada for political reasons, and not released to the general public until 1976.

== Production ==
The film, then titled as Les informateurs, was approved by the French Programme Committee in 1969. It was initially produced by Guy Coté, but was replaced by Pierre Maheu and Maheu handed control over to Marc Beaudet when the film was being edited. The director of French production, Jacques Godbout, was replaced by Gilles Dignard during the production of the film.

The plot of the film, now retitled to On est au coton, shifted from being a three-part story about technocrats who serve as the backbone of the state to being about textile workers in Quebec. It was completed with a budget of $152,266 (equivalent to $1,231,629 in 2025)

== Suppression ==
National Film Board of Canada Commissioner Hugo McPherson ordered that all references to him be removed and Arcand replaced the censored areas with readings of McPherson's letter. Assistant NFB Film Commissioner André Lamy criticized multiple French productions, such as Cotton Mill, Treadmill, 24 heures ou plus, and Un pays sans bon sens!, as being too biased or separatist and were ordered to not be released in 1970.

The film was accused of promoting class conflict and being Marxist propaganda. Commissioner Sydney Newman requested legal advice due to the film featuring members of Front de libération du Québec calling for violence. Newman prohibited Arcand from including a reading of a complaint letter from a textile industry executive in the censored areas of the film. The length of the documentary decreased from 173 minutes to 162 minutes following cuts.

The release of the film was blocked for several years due to its politically sensitive nature. The president of the Canadian Textile Institute wrote to Newman and criticized the film as being misrepresentative of the industry and Newman stated that he would not allow public screenings of the film until he was satisfied with the film himself. Newman ordered that the film could only be shown with either his or Lamy's permission, but he was unsuccessful in preventing the film from being shown at a NFB staff screening.

Newman was quoted as stating that "there are many factual errors either through bad research or overzealous attempts to show the evils of capitalism. The general tone is a slashing attack on the English-controlled textile industry. I tell people, 'if you want to make a smear film, make sure you present invincible arguments.' This one didn't."

== Release ==
In April 1970, Newman announced that the movie would not be released, but two videotape bootleg versions, with one being uncut, were distributed. The film was shown at Cégep du Vieux Montréal from 31 May to 4 June, and bootleg copies were distributed across Canadian colleges. It was estimated that over 20,000 people watched the film by 1979.

A letter signed by thirty-one textile unions affiliated with Confédération des syndicats nationaux calling for the release of the film was published by Le Devoir in 1971.

An edited version of the film was released in 1976 by Lamy. Lamy felt that the film no longer needed to be withheld from distribution after the subsidence of political violence following the October Crisis. Moreover, the ban on distribution of On est au coton and other films was contrary to the NFB's reputation for freedom and creativity. When Lamy learned that the Conseil québécois pour la diffusion du cinéma had decided to distribute an unlicensed copy of the film, he chose not to take legal measures, and released an edited version of the film. The film was not released in its original, uncensored form until 2004.

== See also ==
- 24 heures ou plus

== Works cited ==
- Evans, Gary (1991). In the National Interest: A Chronicle of the National Film Board of Canada from 1949 to 1989. University of Toronto Press. ISBN 0802027849.
