= Claude Joli-Coeur =

Claude Joli-Coeur was the 16th Government Film Commissioner and Chairman of the National Film Board of Canada. He was appointed to the post on November 27, 2014, after previously serving as interim Government Film Commissioner. A lawyer by training with a background in entertainment law as well as international co-productions, Joli-Coeur first joined the NFB in 2003, before becoming assistant commissioner in 2007.

On March 8, 2016, International Women's Day, Joli-Coeur announced a new gender-parity initiative at the NFB that will see half of all its production spending committed to films directed by women. On June 21, 2016, he received the "Please Adjust Your Set Award" from Women in Film + Television Vancouver, "which honours a person or organization that has made a major contribution to promote gender equality in film, television or screen based media."

== Background ==
Prior to joining the NFB, he worked for Astral Entertainment Group, as Director of Business Affairs and then as Vice President of Legal and Business Affairs, from 1987 to 1995. In 1995, he was appointed vice president, Legal and International Affairs, at Le Groupe Coscient, a position he held for five years. From 2000 to 2002, he served as vice president, Legal and Business Affairs, and Secretary at TVA International, as well as vice president, Business Affairs, at Zone 3.

Cultural offices
| Preceded by Tom Perlmutter | Government Film Commissioner and Chairperson of the National Film Board of Canada; 2014-2022 | Succeeded by Suzanne Guèvremont |
