= Tom Perlmutter =

Canadian film commissioner

Tom Perlmutter (born September 6, 1948) is a Canadian film and digital media writer and producer who was the 15th Government Film Commissioner and Chairperson of the National Film Board of Canada, from May 17, 2007, to December 31, 2013.

== NFB career ==
During his tenure as NFB commissioner, Perlmutter spearheaded the move by Canada's public producer into digital media production and mobile platforms, and developed its NFB.ca online screening room. He reallocated 20% of the NFB's production budget to interactive media and committed the NFB to digitizing 60% of its most popular films over a five-year period. Perlmutter also started the NFB's Digital Studios, focusing on interactive works, based in Vancouver (for English-language works) and Montreal (for French productions).

He had been appointed to the post by Canadian Heritage Minister Bev Oda, and began serving his first term on May 17, 2007. On May 8, 2012, Heritage Minister James Moore announced that Perlmutter was reappointed to the post of commissioner for a second term, until 2017. In his statement, Moore cited Perlmutter's "wealth of experience and leadership... [h]is dedication to the film industry and his commitment to the NFB's digitization initiative" as reasons for the reappointment. On December 10, 2013, the NFB announced that Perlmutter would step down as NFB head to advise and write about the impact of technology on content creation and the challenges facing the public sector in the 21st century. On February 27, 2014, the NFB announced that Perlmutter's employment had ended and he was no longer with the organization in any capacity.

Perlmutter had previously served as its head of the NFB's English Program since 2001. During his time as head of English Program, he led one the NFB's first forays into mobile content, with its 2006 series Shorts in Motion.

== Pre-NFB ==
Prior to joining the NFB, his private sector film experience included serving as the founding head of documentaries at Barna-Alper Productions.

A former writer and editor of the trade magazine Cinema Canada, Perlmutter had also served as executive director of the Alliance for Children and Television and as head of development at CineNova Productions in Toronto. In 2000, he cofounded the Toronto-based Primitive Entertainment.

== Early life and education ==
Perlmutter was born on September 6, 1948, in Hungary. He arrived in Montreal with his mother at age four, after a brief time in Israel. He has an MBA from the University of Toronto. He also attended Oxford University and spent a decade working in Britain in publishing before returning to Canada to work in documentary film.

Cultural offices
Preceded by Jacques Bensimon	Government Film Commissioner and Chairperson of the National Film Board of Canada; 2007-2013	Succeeded by Claude Joli-Coeur
