= Ronny Jaques =

British photographer

Ronny Jaques (1910–2008) was a British photographer from London.

== Early life ==
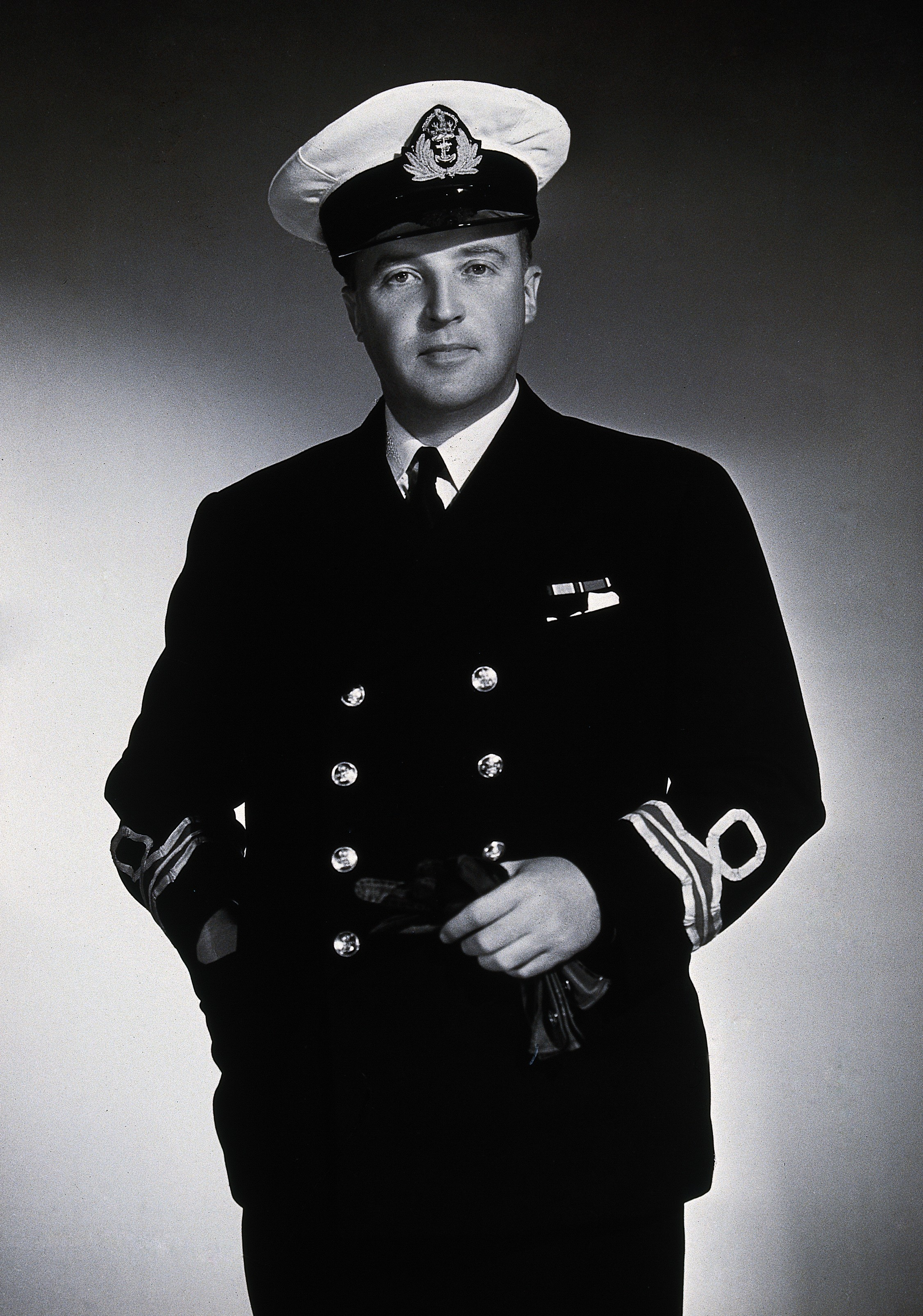
Charles Herbert Best in a portrait photograph by Ronny Jaques

The son of a bookmaker who died when he was run over by a train in the London Underground, during World War I Ronny Jaques was sent to boarding school in a coastal town on the Thames. The school was then moved to Bedford, in the middle of England, to avoid air raids. Jaques stayed there until the end of the war. When he was 9 years old, his mother closed his father's business and moved the family to Christie Lake in Canada.

In 1925, Jaques moved to New York City with his brother Louis. During that time, he worked for Henry L. Dougherty, the founder of a gas company. In 1932 both brothers quit their jobs and went bicycling through Europe for two years. Jaques then enrolled at the Regent Street Polytechnic in London where he learned photography, remaining for about 8 months. He then moved to Canada where he opened the Ronny Jaques Studio at 24 Grenville Street in Toronto. In 1941, he closed the studio to focus on his photography career in NYC.

== Photography career ==
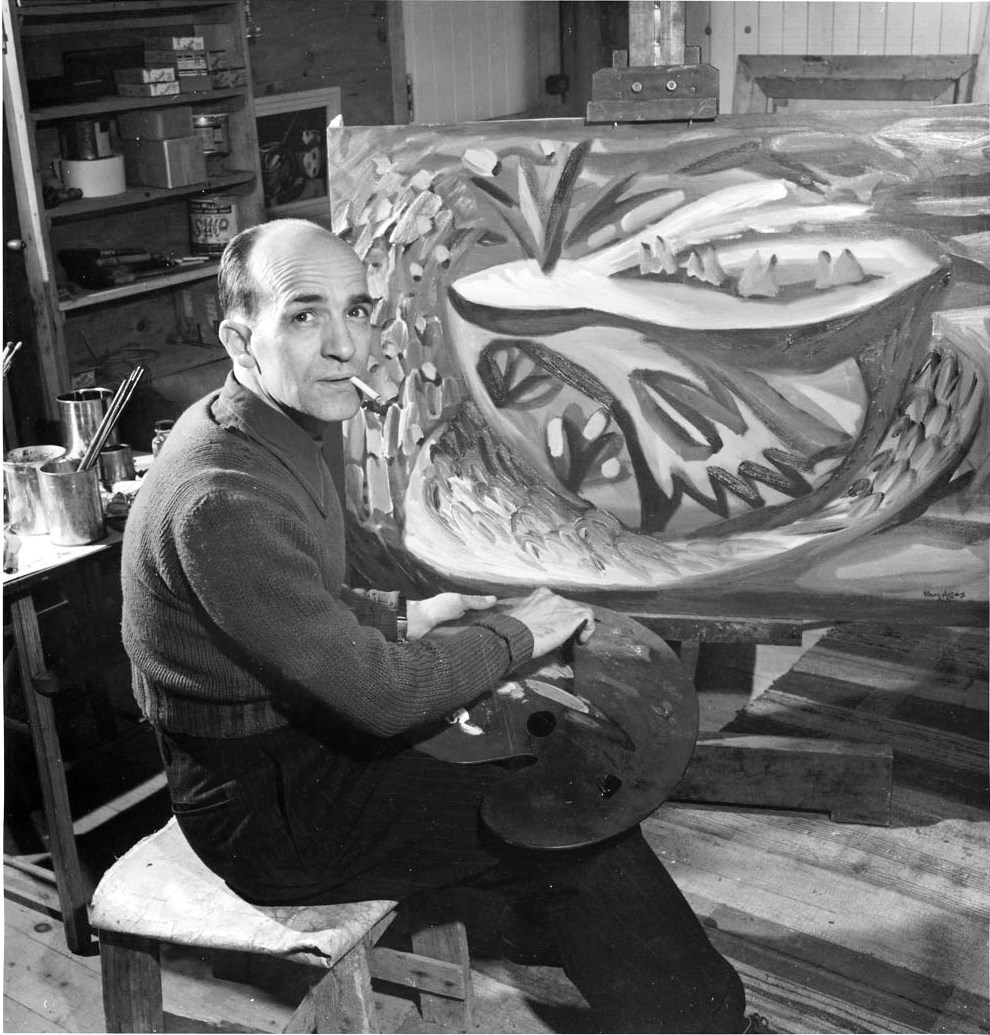
Artist Paul Borduas photographed by Ronny Jaques

During the 1940s, 1950s and 1960s he worked as a photographer for magazines such as Harper's Bazaar, Gourmet, Holiday and Town and Country for which he shot fashion, travel, food and lifestyle photography, and for Maclean's during the mid-fifties he worked with writer Bruce Hutchison on a travel series

During his free time, Jaques took pictures at The Downbeat Club, a jazz club in New York, where he photographed celebrities such as Billie Holiday, Duke Ellington, Ben Webster, Coleman Hawkins, and Nat King Cole.

Unlike many of his contemporaries, Ronny Jaques had a reputation for being low-key; he eschewed assistants and entourage and preferred to work without set-dressing or elaborate lighting. For his covers for Gourmet of the 1960s the dishes are often set against, or on, a photographic print to serve the magazine's increasing focus on travel by linking the food to a particular city or nation, rather than actually being photographed on location.

== Recognition ==
From Jaques' magazine work, in 1955 curator Edward Steichen selected three of his photographs for the world-touring Museum of Modern Art exhibition The Family of Man that was seen by 9 million visitors. In one close-up, three Canadian girls with grim expressions stand at a wire fence against a field that extends to a high horizon on which, in front of an overcast sky stands a house as square and simple as a child's drawing. Another, also shot in Canada, shows a late night in a bar with bentwood chairs stacked in the foreground in silhouette, and at the bottom of the frame sit two men drinking, one of whom throws back his head in laughter while a painting of a bare-breasted woman looks down on them. The third shows a broad tree-lined path in a Colombian park that is lit with dust-filtered low slanting light against which, at centre, appears a park labourer who kneels in prayer as a priest in a cassock passes, his sun umbrella held aloft by his male companion.

== Later life ==
By the 1990s Ronny was living in Copenhagen, Denmark, with Lise, his third wife, and their two children, and Lulu, who was married with four children, and Jens-Louis. He died at the age of 98 in the summer of 2008.

== Legacy ==
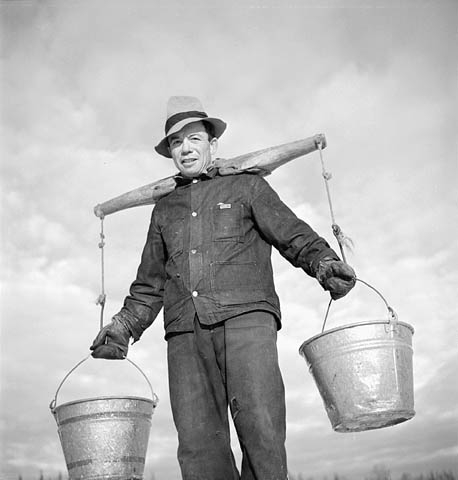
Ronny Jaques: Labourer Andres Budge of Maniwaki carrying water buckets with a yoke on his shoulders at Mr. Kearney's logging camp in the Outaouais region on a day winter in 1943.

After his death in September 2008, Ronny Jaques' photographs were published in the book Stolen Moments, by editor in chief of Town and Country, and close friend of Jaques, Pamela Fiori. The compilation of black and white photographs, many of them from the 1940s, include Jaques' portraits of Marlon Brando, Bette Davis, Cary Grant, Billie Holiday, Leonard Bernstein, Carson McCullers, George S. Kaufman, W. H. Auden, Mary Martin and Ezio Pinza rehearsing South Pacific with Richard Rodgers on the piano, the Duke and Duchess of Windsor, Leonard Bernstein, Weegee at a crime scene, Robert Mitchum, George S. Kaufman and others.

== Books ==
- (1984) Paul J Wade, Ronny Jaques. Greece and the Olympic Games. OCLC: 28012041
- Jaques, Ronny; Micossi, Mario (1978), Gourmet's France, Gourmet

== Bibliography ==
- (2009) Pamela Fiori. Stolen Moments: The Photographs of Ronny Jaques. Glitterati Incorporated. ISBN 978-0-9801557-2-3
