= Joan Pennefather =

Canadian film and cultural executive

Joan Pennefather is a Canadian film and cultural executive. She was the first woman to be the Commissioner of the National Film Board of Canada (NFB).

== Early life ==
Pennefather was born in Montreal, Quebec, and studied history and communications at Marianopolis College, McGill University, Concordia University and in the United Kingdom at the University of Oxford.

== Career ==
Pennefather joined the NFB in 1977, working as a Sponsored Program Officer. In this capacity, she was responsible for producing films for various departments of the Canadian government, both in-house at the NFB and with independent production companies. In 1981, she was promoted to become the Executive Assistant to the Deputy Film Commissioner of the NFB, and two years later was appointed the organisation's Planning Co-ordinator.

By the end of 1988, Pennefather was the NFB's Vice-Film Commissioner. When François N. Macerola left in December that year, six months before the end of his contract, Pennefather was appointed as acting Government Film Commissioner in his place. One of her main tasks during this interim period was to oversee the NFB's fiftieth anniversary celebrations in May 1989. On September 15, 1989, Pennefather was appointed as Government Film Commissioner and Chair of the NFB on an official basis.

In 1992, Pennefather and the NFB hosted a pre-conference event entitled "It Matters Who Makes It", designed to discuss ways of improving the status of women in the media both on and off the screen, as part of the International Institute of Communications conference being held in Montreal. This event was attended by more than fifty women in the media from seventeen countries. However, the same year Pennefather was forced to appear before the Senate Subcommittee on Veterans' Affairs to defend the documentary series The Valour and the Horror, which the NFB had co-produced with Galafilm Inc. and the Canadian Broadcasting Corporation. The series had been criticised by some veterans of World War II for its accusations of unprosecuted war crimes committed by Canadian troops. In 1993 she was presented with an Astral Award by the Toronto Women in Film and Television organisation, in recognition of her work to promote the role of women in the film and television industries.

Pennefather left the NFB in December 1994. This was because she had applied for and been appointed to the position of chief executive officer of the National Arts Centre. However, she spent only one year in this position, leaving in 1995 for "undisclosed reasons".

In 1998 Pennefather became a Commissioner of the Canadian Radio-television and Telecommunications Commission (CRTC). In the 2000s she became the General Manager of the arts funding organisation the Imperial Tobacco Canada Foundation.

== Personal life ==
Pennefather was married to former Solicitor General of Canada Francis Fox when it was revealed in 1978 that he had forged the signature of his then-girlfriend's husband on a form granting permission for her to have an abortion. Fox resigned his post as Solicitor General, and she and Fox divorced.

Cultural offices
Preceded by François N. Macerola	Government Film Commissioner and Chairperson of the National Film Board of Canada; 1988–1994	Succeeded by Sandra M. Macdonald
