= Motion design =

Motion design may refer to:

- Motion graphic design, designing the motion of graphics
- Interactive design, designing for interactivity via user motion
