= The Valour and the Horror =

- Created by: Brian McKenna
- Story by: Brian McKenna; Terence McKenna
- Directed by: Brian McKenna
- Narrated by: Terence McKenna
- Country of origin: Canada
- Original language: English
- No. of episodes: 3

Production
- Producers: Brian McKenna; Arnie Gelbart; André Lamy; Adam Symansky; Darce Fardy
- Cinematography: Neville Ottey; Andrew Binnington
- Editors: Susan Shanks; Alfonso Peccia
- Running time: 312 minutes

Original release
- Network: CBC Television
- Release: January 12 – January 26, 1992

The Valour and the Horror is a Canadian television documentary miniseries, which aired on CBC Television in 1992. The series investigated three significant Canadian battles from the Second World War and was a co-production between the CBC, the National Film Board of Canada (NFB) and Galafilm Inc. The films were also broadcast by Radio-Canada, the French network of the CBC. The series was written by Brian McKenna, an award-winning journalist and founding producer of The Fifth Estate and his brother, Terence McKenna, and was directed by Brian McKenna.

== The series ==
The series consisted of three two-hour films: Savage Christmas: Hong Kong 1941, Death by Moonlight: Bomber Command and In Desperate Battle: Normandy 1944, and was broadcast to critical acclaim. Almost three million people, in English and French, viewed each prime time broadcast.

=== Savage Christmas: Hong Kong 1941 ===
The central theme of this program was that the force of soldiers sent to fight in the Battle of Hong Kong was "knowingly sent into a war zone without adequate training." The episode first aired on 12 January 1992. This episode was the least controversial:

This program was the one least criticized by veterans and historians; indeed, except for three minutes of a 104-minute presentation, Savage Christmas showed nothing to which any reasonable person could object.

=== Death by Moonlight: Bomber Command ===
The central themes of the second program in the series are that RAF Bomber Command "deliberately hid the truth" about RAF bomber crew survival rates, concealed plans about deliberately annihilating civilians, and betrayed the trust of Canadian military airmen. The episode first aired on January 19, 1992.

=== In Desperate Battle: Normandy 1944 ===
The central theme of the third and final presentation in the series concern the training and leadership of the Canadian Army in the Battle of Normandy, alleging that "The true story of those battles has never really been told." The show first aired on 26 January 1992.

== Controversy ==
Canadian veterans' groups and some prominent historians attacked the films for allegedly presenting a biased and inaccurate portrait of Canadian military actions. In Desperate Battle, the allegation that there was significant incompetence on the part of Canadian military command, and claims that Canadian soldiers had committed significant, but un-prosecuted, war crimes against German soldiers, was challenged. Death by Moonlight alleged that Bomber Command, unable to hit military targets with any precision, ultimately turned their attention to German cities and killed more than 600,000 German civilians, mostly old men, women and children, using high explosives and incendiary bombs. They died not as a result of collateral damage, but as part of a deliberate campaign. The producers claimed that the directives remained top secret throughout the war. The films also claimed that bomber crews, flying at night, were, for the most part, kept in the dark about their true mission. As noted in the CBC Ombudsman’s report, many of these assertions were not adequately supported by documentary evidence.

The series became the subject of an inquiry by the Senate of Canada. The NFB's Commissioner at the time, Joan Pennefather, did appear before the committee to defend the production. Pierre Berton, Margaret Atwood and Shirley Douglas, as well as PEN, the Writer's Union, the Guild, the Producer's Association, and many others defended the series. Military historian Desmond Morton stated, "As the McKennas' critics discovered, one of the most difficult things to do in a free society is to criticize the media...Anyone criticizing the media will find them judge, jury, and defence lawyer in their own case." The Senate sub-committee ultimately sided with the veterans' complaints against the filmmakers. The Sub-committee noted "that the criticisms levelled at The Valour and the Horror are for the most part legitimate. Simply put, although the filmmakers have a right to their point of view, they have failed to present that point of view with any degree of accuracy or fairness."

The films were also investigated by the Canadian Radio-television and Telecommunications Commission, which sided with the filmmakers. A group of air force veterans formed the Bomber Harris Trust. Claiming they had been slandered, they sued the film and the filmmakers for $500 million. The class action suit was dismissed by Ontario justice Mr. Robert Montgomery, himself a Second World War veteran. The Bomber Command veterans appealed to the Supreme Court, but were dismissed at every level.

The Ontario Court of Appeal ruled that the veterans did not have standing for a class action suit and that "The broadcast was aimed not at the plaintiffs or any other Canadian involved in the bombings, but at the British High Command which ordered the bombing and particularly at its overall commander." It was further noted "It is possible to criticize, even strenuously to criticize, the misplaced emphases, the caricaturish portrayals of some of the strategies, the inaccuracy of some of the detail, and the omission of some of the countervailing considerations in the film." In addition Mr. Justice Grange wrote that, "There can be nothing wrong with the air crew obeying lawful orders and participating in acts of war that were neither war crimes nor crimes against humanity as defined in our courts". The merits of the veterans’ claims were never presented in court and the courts never ruled on them.

In 1993, the films were broadcast by Channel Four in Great Britain. The Queen Mother, honorary Colonel of Bomber Command, tried to stop the broadcast, but was unsuccessful. As in Canada, the films stirred a fierce historical debate.

== Honours ==
The films were honoured three times at the 1993 Gemini Awards, the highest honour for Canadian film and television. The awards were:

- Best Direction In An Information Or Documentary Program Or Series (Brian McKenna)
- Best Writing In An Information/Documentary Program Or Series (Brian and Terence McKenna)
- Best Documentary Series.

For the first and only time in history, the French versions of the films received similar honours at the Prix Gemaux—awarded the prizes for Best Documentary and Best Direction.

== Investigation ==
The CBC Ombudsman, William Morgan, and his office, investigated the series, and had historian S.F. Wise prepare a report on it. The report's findings concluded that some claims were untrue; material was presented out of context so that it was misleading; information differing from the producers’ views were ignored; and that the series cannot be considered history rather, at best, editorializing. The CBC Ombudsman then issued a report noting that The Valour and the Horror has serious problems with accuracy in particular "various interpretations and assertions which the producers were unable adequately to support with documentary evidence and which were questioned or challenged by the historians consulted, including those recommended by the program makers themselves." The report further noted that The Valour and the Horror "is flawed and fails to measure up to the CBC’s demanding policies and procedures."

== Related books ==
A book by Merilyn Simonds and Merrily Weisbord accompanied the original series. Military historians David Bercuson and S. F. Wise later published The Valour and the Horror Revisited, a book examining the historical accuracy of the films. When the official history of the Royal Canadian Air Force was finally published, the main points of the Bomber Command episode were supported, prompting Maclean's magazine to write that the film and the filmmakers were "totally vindicated." Historian Jack Granatstein, in a book review in Quill and Quire, sarcastically called it "'The Valour and Horror' ' with footnotes." Granatstein severely criticized The Valour and the Horror in his book, Who Killed Canadian History?
