= Web documentary =

A web documentary, interactive documentary, or multimedia documentary is a documentary production that differs from the more traditional forms—video, audio, photographic—by applying a full complement of multimedia tools. The interactive multimedia capability of the Internet provides documentarians with a unique medium to create non-linear productions that combine photography, text, audio, video, animation, and infographics based on real time content. This way the publications progresses over several weeks.

Since it is an interactive work, the narrative advances through the actions taken by the users through public interface. The user is able to modify their journey through the documentary based on their responses. This way the participation by the users are the key element that give meaning to this new audiovisual genre. For the first time in the history of documentary, the viewer acquires control of navigation, in a way becoming the author or creator of its own personalized documentary.

It is possible to say that the sender and the receiver of the media are at the same level. It is difficult to classify web documentary within a determined space, as this new format documentary is the result of the union between the combination of languages and communication systems, along with new interactive experiences where users acquire a key role due to its interactivity.

== Differences with film documentaries ==
The web documentary differs from film documentaries through the integration of a combination of multimedia assets (photos, text, audio, animation, graphic design, etc.) with web technologies. In a web documentary, the user has to interact with, or navigate through, the story.

Compared to a linear narrative where the destination of the story is pre-determined by the filmmaker, a web documentary provides a user with the experience of moving through the story via clusters of information. The integration of information architecture, graphic design, imagery, titles, and sub-titles all play a role in providing visual clues to the user as to the sequence through which they should move through the web documentary. But from that point, the users have to explore the components of the story that interest them the most.

== See also ==
- Photojournalism
- Communication design
- Copywriting
- Information design
- Typography
- Desktop publishing
- Motion design
- Interface design
- Web graphic design
