= Genetic Control =

Musical group

- Origin: Montreal, Quebec, Canada
- Genres: Punk rock
- Years active: 1982–1986; 1998–present
- Labels: Generic Records, Sonik's Chicken Shrimp Records, Return To Analog Records
- Members: Mike Price; Rob Porter; Rob Huppé; Douglas Crevier; Louis Lévesque
- Website: http://www.myspace.com/geneticcontrol1

Genetic Control is a Canadian hardcore punk band from Montreal, Quebec, whose "First Impressions" single is a sought after disc for punk record collectors worldwide. They existed from 1983 to 1985, and reunited in 1998. They played with many bands such as the Dead Kennedys, GBH and Suicidal Tendencies. They were known for the comical disguises they wore on stage.

== History ==
Genetic Control began in 1983 when two bands came together: Mike Price, Rob Huppé and Doug Crevier from the band "Out Of Step". Before "Out Of Step", Huppe and Crevier had played as an instrumental three-piece consisting of Huppe on guitar, Crevier on bass and Alex Soria on drums. They didn't have a band name at that time. Soria was also the singer in a band called The Nils, who were also just starting out. As it turns out Soria was not their drummer, but was just drumming with them as they did not have a regular drummer. Soria was working on getting the Nils happening at the time. Mike Price approached Huppé and Crevier and asked them if they wanted to start a band; "Out of Step" was formed. However, they never played a real show during this time. They just wrote songs and played small shows at the BBC, at their rehearsal space. The drummer during this period was Marc Doucet. The band started jamming and playing many covers by Bad Religion, Minor Threat, and the Bad Brains etc.

Marc left the band in 1983. Jean Ruthann from Unruled became the next drummer for a brief period. After Jean Left the search was on for another drummer when someone suggested that Rob Porter a guitar and drummer Mike Brisbois were looking for a singer and a bass player. They were called "Drunken Disturbance", formerly of "Terry Fox's Right Leg". The two bands united and immediately started jamming. The first gig Genetic Control played was at Le Cargo on February 2, 1984.

The name "Genetic Control" was taken from a lyric from the song "Get 'em out by Friday", from the album Foxtrot by the band Genesis. The name was also influenced by George Orwell and Aldus Huxley. Genetic Control was an organization that was in charge of designing people in the future from Huxley's novel Brave New World.

Mike Brisbois left the band after a few of shows with the band in early 1984

Louis Leveque was then added from the local band Unruled, who were influenced by Discharge and GBH. Leveque was about 16 or 17 and had played with a Genesis cover band before joining Unruled. He was an incredible progressive rock influenced drummer. Once he joined, it took the band to a new level musically.

They used to jam the entire album Killer by Alice Cooper, and rehearsed almost every day to get their new sound and songs as tight as possible.

Influenced by Minor Threat and the Bad Brains, the band established itself in an old apartment block which also served as a rehearsal space for local bands. It was dubbed the BBC (for Bleury Beach Club), which gave birth to the 1980s Montreal hardcore scene.

The lyrics were written by Singer Mike Zabo Price and featured some historical references at times. However the lyrics were not intended to be political and some songs contained humorous subject matter. The band enjoyed adding humor into the live shows and preferred not to take themselves too seriously. The band first released the song "Suburban Life" on the Primitive Air-Raid compilation album on Psyche Industry Records in 1984.

They wanted to record an album in 1984, but they did not have sufficient funds, and settled for a single release. "First Impressions" was released on Generic Records, and only 500 copies were pressed. Singer Mike Price recorded while on crutches, after he was hurt in the mosh pit during one of their first shows. They also recorded an album in 1985, but there were no master tapes made, as the band opted instead for just a cassette recording, as they could not afford to pay for the multi-track tape, a decision the band and many fans have regretted over the years.

The band was supposed to go on tour and release an album in 1985 but shortly after, failing to release their LP, they disbanded. Mike Zabo went on tour with Metal Church and pursued a career in concert production

In the following years, their single, which was already very rare, became one of the most sought after collectibles by punk rock record collectors all around the world, fetching as much as $1500.00 on eBay. This prompted the German label Lost & Found Records, to press a bootleg of the 7" on CD, with the song "Suburban Life" as a bonus track. However, the band were never paid for the article.

Genetic Control reunited in 1998 for the Les Foufounes Électriques 15-year anniversary, playing a few shows during the summer. They then started to play regularly again, even though some members were by then in Toronto, and others in Vancouver and Montreal. In 2005, they released Brave New World on Sonik's Chicken Shrimp Records, which was taken from the 1998 Misfits concerts, and included a new song, the original 7" single and "Suburban Life". It became the first of the Sonik's Chicken Shrimp Records releases to go out of print.

In 2018, the band re-released their infamous debut 45 ep on 7 inch vinyl in limited quantities on the Return To Analog record label. They also released a 12-inch version of the single featuring rare studio outtakes from the first recording session and alternate mixes. There is also a box set in the works as well as the previously unreleased LP and a covers album.

They also plan on releasing a live video from the '77 Montreal Festival they played in 2017.

== Personnel ==
- Mike Price, also known as Zabo or Polio Elvis – vocals
- Rob Porter, also known as Teen Hunk Rob, Robbo, or Bobby Casino – lead guitar
- Rob Huppé, also known as Duke Crysal or Kung Fu Rob – rhythm guitar
- Douglas Crevier, also known as Dick Pageant or Dougo – bass guitar
- Louis Lévesque, also known as Late Louis – drums
- Mike Brisebois – drums (Never played on a recording with the band)

== Discography ==
=== Singles ===
First Impressions 7" (Generic Records, 1984. 500 pressings)

1. "Love Rat"
2. "Brave New World"
3. "Urban Cowboy"
4. "1984"

First Impressions 7" (Return To Analog, 2018. Identical to original 1984 release)

1. "Love Rat"
2. "Brave New World"
3. "Urban Cowboy"
4. "1984"

=== Albums ===
Brave New World Live (Sonik's Chicken Shrimp Records, 2005)

1. "Suburban Life"
2. "1984"
3. "Puff The Magic Dragon"
4. "Dirty Rockers"
5. "Abandoned At Birth"
6. "Meet Billy"
7. "Big Takeover" (Bad Brains Cover)
8. "Right Brigade" (Bad Brains Cover)
9. "Brave New World"
10. "First Impressions"
11. "The Ballad Of Gilligan's Island"
12. "New Fucking Song"
13. "Drunk Again"
14. "Love Rat"
15. "Rocking With Seka"
16. "Urban Cowboy"
17. "Betray" (Minor Threat Cover)

First Impressions 12" (Return To Analog, 2018 Alternate mixes & versions side 2)

1. "Love Rat"
2. "Brave New World"
3. "Urban Cowboy"
4. "1984"
5. "Dirty Rockers"
6. "First Impressions"

Box Set 12" & 7" (Return To Analog, 2022)

=== Compilation albums ===
- "Suburban Life" on the Primitive Air-Raid compilation album (Psyche Industry Records, 1984)
- "1984" on the Golden Shower Of 72 Hits compilation album. (Illegally Released, Not Licensed to Lost & Found Records)
