= Major Maker =

Canadian indie rock band

- Origin: Toronto, Ontario, Canada
- Genres: Indie rock
- Years active: 2006–present
- Label: EMI
- Members: Todor Kobakov; Lindy Vopnfjörð; Thomas D'Arcy; Ian LeFeuvre; John Ocerbian
- Website: majormaker.com

Major Maker is a Canadian indie rock band, formed in Toronto, Ontario in 2006 by Bulgarian-born Todor Kobakov and singer-songwriter Lindy Vopnfjörð.

== History ==
=== Founding ===
Their track "Rollercoaster" was used in a Maynards candy commercial, which led the company to be inundated with requests for the name of the band. The commercial was viewed more than 77,000 times on YouTube and was written about in the Toronto Sun and in Marketing magazine. The duo wrote the song initially for the 30-second ad, calling it "Maynards Candy Song", but after its popularity they wrote two-and-a-half minutes more of the song, retitled it, and released it for digital download in July 2007. The single "Rollercoaster" entered Billboard's Canadian Hot 100 Chart and peaked at number 57 after 12 weeks on the chart.

They also licensed the song "Talk to You" to Telus, which was unreleased until Lindy Vopnfjörð uploaded the song on his YouTube channel.

=== All Illusion (2006) ===
Their 2006 debut full-length release All Illusion was recorded and mixed in Kobakov's house. Their 2007 EP People Carrier includes two remixes of "Rollercoaster", one by Small Sins and one by Sofia Scandalli.

=== Members ===
Kobakov, who by age 20 had completed a music performance degree in classical piano at the University of Toronto, has written film scores, including for the movie Young People Fucking. He has done string arrangements for such artists as Stars and Sarah Slean. He has also toured as part of the live band for Emily Haines and the Soft Skeleton and Small Sins. Separately, Kobakov has released three albums under the name Cy Scobie, and a classical piano album called Pop Music.

Vopnfjörð has also released several solo albums, most recently Young Waverer in 2013. He has played all over Canada, the United States and the United Kingdom throughout his career. He achieved his first number one single on CBC Radio 3's The R3-30 charts in May 2013.

For live shows, Kobakov and Vopnfjörð are joined by bassist Thomas D'Arcy of Small Sins, guitarist Ian LeFeuvre of Starling, guitarist Steve Krecklo of The Carnations, and drummer John Ocerbian from Sarah Harmer's band.

== Discography ==
=== Albums ===
List of studio and live albums
Year	Album title	Release details
2006	All Illusion	Released: Jan 28, 2007; Label: Major Maker Music; Format: CD, digital
2007	People Carrier EP	Released: Oct 30, 2007; Label: Major Maker Music; Format: CD, digital
2008	Funky Lady EP	Released: Dec 16, 2008; Label: Major Maker Music; Format: CD, digital

=== Singles ===
Incomplete list of singles by Major Maker
Year	Title	Chart peaks				Album	Certifications
Year	Title	Can. 100	iTunes			Album	Certifications
2007	"Rollercoaster"	57	2	—	—	none	Charted on Top 40 and Hot AC radio
