= Brave New Waves =

Canadian radio program

- Running time: 4 hrs., 6 hrs in the first year
- Country of origin: Canada
- Home station: CBC Stereo/CBC Radio 2
- Hosted by: Augusta La Paix (1984–1985); Brent Bambury (1985–1995); Patti Schmidt (1995–2006)
- Created by: Alan Conter and Augusta La Paix
- Original release: February 6, 1984 – March 16, 2007

Brave New Waves was a Canadian radio program which aired on CBC Stereo, later known as CBC Radio 2, from 1984 to 2007. Airing overnight five nights a week, the show profiled alternative and indie music and culture, including film, comics, literature and art. The show was once described by longtime host Brent Bambury as "explaining fringe culture to a comfortable mainstream audience," and by his successor Patti Schmidt as "invented with an idea of what John Peel's show was, but without ever having heard it."

== History ==
The show was created after Augusta La Paix submitted a demo tape for a show on avant garde culture, featuring music by Laurie Anderson, Brian Eno, Klaus Nomi and Nina Hagen. In an early interview with The Globe and Mail, La Paix told the newspaper that she was only a recent convert to underground music, having previously been primarily a fan of country music.

Produced throughout its run at the CBC's studios in Montreal and originally hosted by La Paix, the show aired for the first time on February 6, 1984. The first song it ever played was Simple Minds' "Promised You a Miracle". In its first year, the show was briefly the subject of a police investigation into obscenity charges, when a CBC employee who disliked the show filed an anonymous complaint about an interview with underground performance artist Karen Finley, although the investigation was dropped by the police without charges.

The show's initial audience figures could not be directly measured, as the Bureau of Broadcast Measurement did not track radio ratings for the show's overnight time slot; however, indirect indications of success were available as both its lead-in and lead-out programs, A Little Night Music and Stereo Morning, posted significant and sustained audience gains after Brave New Waves debuted.

In 1985, La Paix left the show to become host of CBC Stereo's Two New Hours, and was replaced by Bambury, previously a researcher for and occasional substitute host of the show. Music programming in these days, was the work of Kevin Komoda, who later went on to produce the first in studio sessions.

Throughout the 1980s, Brave New Waves was an influential show, providing many Canadians without access to campus radio with their main exposure to alternative music, and was widely credited for significant increases in both record sales and concert attendance for both Canadian and international bands who were playlisted on the show. In addition, the show also increased the profile of underground and experimental writers and artists and filmmakers, including Laurie Anderson, Kathy Acker, bill bissett and Todd Solondz.

In 1990, the program was scheduled to receive a short-term trial run on WXPN in Philadelphia, with an eye toward being picked up for U.S. syndication by National Public Radio; however, due to the obscenity controversies that were prominent in American music at the time, NPR opted to cancel the contract because Brave New Waves did not censor songs with potentially objectionable lyrics.

In the 1990s, when alternative rock became the decade's dominant commercial genre, the show kept its focus on the underground. In 1995, Bambury left the program to become cohost of CBC Television's Midday, and was replaced by Patti Schmidt, who also became the executive producer of the program. Since 1991, she had been writing and programming music for the show. Schmidt remained the program's main host for the remainder of its run; however, due to budgetary pressures at the CBC, Schmidt was forced to work with a smaller staff and budget than Bambury had enjoyed, with the result that the program became more squarely focused on playing music, with interviews reduced to one per week. The program became a reference and filter for all manner of new and contemporary music from indie rock, pop, metal and weird folk, to IDM, electronic dance music, edgy hip hop, avant garde jazz, noise, sound art, modern classical and all things uncategorizable.

On May 27, 2006, the program aired an episode which was structured as a finale, with Schmidt conducting the show as a wrap party and then ending it by naming and thanking everybody who had ever worked on the show from its premiere in 1984. The final piece of music played was William Basinski's "Disintegration Loops". Although the show continued to air after that date, for the remainder of its run it was reduced to just one hour per night of new programming hosted by a rotating stable of guest hosts, with the remaining three hours filled by repeats of past BNW programs.

On January 17, 2007, it was announced that Brave New Waves would be removed from the CBC Radio 2 line-up as part of a rebranding of the network. The program aired for the last time on March 16, 2007.

The show was inducted into Hour magazine's Montreal Rock'n'Roll Hall of Fame in 2010.

== Album ==
Brave New Waves

Compilation album by Various Artists

In 1988, the program also began recording live in-studio sessions curated by producer Kevin Komoda, some of which were released on the 1991 compilation album Brave New Waves. It was released in 1991 on CBC Records, the Canadian Broadcasting Corporation's internal record label.

=== Track listing ===
1. Bolero Lava, "Easy" (4:06)
2. Jr. Gone Wild, "I Don't Know About All That" (3:18)
3. The Amateurs, "Wishing Hoping Praying" (4:22)
4. The Grapes of Wrath, "Backwards Town" (2:42)
5. Change of Heart, "Pat's Decline" (3:38)
6. Fifth Column, "Like This" (5:35)
7. Sarah McLachlan, "Steaming" (5:36)
8. Gordie Adamson and Kevin Komoda, "Are There No Workhouses?" (4:41)
9. Moev, "Alibi" (4:49)
10. Shadowy Men on a Shadowy Planet, "Santa's Compromise" (2:21)
11. Pretty Green, "Kick the Bike" (3:06)
12. Three O'Clock Train, "This Train" (2:40)
13. Asexuals, "Sunday" (3:19)
14. The Nils, "Bandito Calling" (4:24)
15. Flying Bulgar Klezmer Band, "Der Nayer Sher" (2:23)
16. Rheostatics, "Dope Fiends" (3:37)
17. Sons of Freedom, "USA Long Distance" (3:10)
