= Ollie! The Boy Who Became What He Ate =

Television series

- Created by: Sheena Macrae
- Based on: Ollie! The Boy Who Became What He Ate by Sheena Macrae
- Developed by: Diana Moore
- Voices of: Gavin MacIver-Wright; Zoe Hatz
- Theme music composer: Thomas D'Arcy
- Composers: Steve Krecklo; Ian LeFeuvre
- Country of origin: Canada
- Original language: English
- No. of seasons: 2
- No. of episodes: 26 (52 segments)

Production
- Executive producers: Michelle Melanson Cuperus; Sheena Macrae; John Leitch; Mickey Rogers; Ivan Schneeberg; David Fortier
- Running time: 22 minutes (11 minutes per segment)
- Production companies: Keyframe Animation; Mickey Rogers Media; Radical Sheep Junior; Boat Rocker Studios

Original release
- Network: CBC Kids
- Release: February 18, 2017 – February 2, 2019

Ollie! The Boy Who Became What He Ate (sometimes stylized Ollie the Boy Who Became What He Ate or Ollie! or Ollie) is an animated children's television series and the final series produced by Radical Sheep Junior. Each segment is 11 minutes, aired every morning, except for Sunday. It debuted on CBC Kids, Canada on February 18, 2017. The second season premiered on February 2, 2019. It is produced by Keyframe Animation Inc. who created Tee and Mo and Pinky Dinky Doo.

== History ==
The animated series Ollie! The Boy Who Became What He Ate is about Ollie, a hesitant eater who turns every meal into an adventure as he becomes what he eats. It is based on the work of Sheena Macrae, who was also the executive producer of the series. Diana Moore was the executive story editor / writer.

In 2014, CBC Kids, Radical Sheep Productions and Mickey Rogers Media made a deal to produce an animated series. In December 2015, Temple Street Productions' distribution division Temple Street Distribution acquired rights for the series. Steve Krecklo, former member of The Carnations, composed the soundtrack. The series debuted on CBC Kids on February 18, 2017. Season 2 premiered on February 2, 2019.

In April 2019, the series was nominated for the Canada's Youth Media Alliance (YMA) English-language Awards of Excellence for television and digital.

== Broadcast ==
The series aired internationally on Universal Kids (US), Discovery (MENA), Discovery Asia, Huashi TV (China), Bolivision (Bolivia), Azteca Uno (Mexico), Yle Teema (Finland), and Switzerland 4 (Switzerland). It was distributed online by Amazon Prime (excluding Canada) and CBC Gem in Canada.

== Characters ==
- Ollie, a 6 year old boy who is a very picky eater, voiced by Gavin MacIver-Wright.
- Poppy, Ollie's younger sister, voiced by Zoe Hatz. She is implied to be adopted.
- Nummy, Poppy's stuffed rabbit, who speaks in squeaks and comes to life when Ollie and Poppy go on an adventure.
- Leo, Ollie's best friend.
- The Nummlings, little bunny-like creatures who speak in squeaks, like Nummy.

== Episodes ==
=== Season 1 ===
	Title	Original air date
1a	"Ninja Berries"	February 18, 2017
1b	"Sweet Potato Spy"	February 18, 2017
2a	"Watermelon Oasis"	February 25, 2017
2b	"Lettuce Climb"	February 25, 2017
3a	"Sasquash Hunter"	March 4, 2017
3b	"Celery King"	March 4, 2017
4a	"Mushroom Gamer"	March 11, 2017
4b	"Coconut Island"	March 11, 2017
5a	"Circus Chard"	April 15, 2017
5b	"Asparagus X"	April 15, 2017
6a	"Captain Avocado"	April 22, 2017
6b	"Bean Raider"	April 22, 2017
7a	"Dragon Tamer"	April 29, 2017
7b	"Pineapple Boats"	April 29, 2017
8a	"Strawberry Flyer"	May 6, 2017
8b	"Sheriff Ollie Oats"	May 6, 2017
9a	"Garlic Fort"	May 27, 2017
9b	"Deep Sea Carrot"	May 27, 2017
10a	"Banana Wizard"	June 24, 2017
10b	"Pears in Space"	June 24, 2017
11a	"Hide and Spinach"	July 8, 2017
11b	"Peach Pilot"	July 8, 2017
12a	"Cornival"	July 15, 2017
12b	"Zippy Broccoli"	July 15, 2017
13a	"Yogurt Hockey Hero"	July 22, 2017
13b	"Cantaloupe Cave"	July 22, 2017

=== Season 2 ===
	Title	Original air date
1a	"Apple Skier"	February 2, 2019
1b	"Pepper Games"	February 2, 2019
2a	"Underwater Orange"	February 9, 2019
2b	"Egg Parade"	February 9, 2019
3a	"Yoga Plums"	February 16, 2019
3b	"Opopeago"	February 16, 2019
4a	"Cauliflower Suit"	February 23, 2019
4b	"Grape Car Driver"	February 23, 2019
5a	"Cucumber Lifeguard"	March 2, 2019
5b	"Tower of Cheese"	March 2, 2019
6a	"Zucchiniologist"	March 9, 2019
6b	"Tomato Quest"	March 9, 2019
7a	"Brussel Ball"	March 16, 2019
7b	"Cherry Lumberjack"	March 16, 2019
8a	"Potato Guard"	March 23, 2019
8b	"Beet Fleet"	March 23, 2019
9a	"Pinbean Wizard"	March 30, 2019
9b	"Lemon Powered"	March 30, 2019
10a	"Raspberry Mystery"	April 6, 2019
10b	"Cabbage Glider"	April 6, 2019
11a	"Pomegranate Train"	April 13, 2019
11b	"Rice Diggers"	April 13, 2019
12a	"Olive Trucker"	April 20, 2019
12b	"Mango Mountaineer"	April 20, 2019
13a	"Pumpkin Magician"	April 27, 2019
13b	"Doctor Sunflower"	April 27, 2019
