= Lindy Vopnfjörð =

- Also known as: LINDY
- Born: May 26, 1972 (age 54); Winnipeg, Manitoba
- Genres: Folk rock, indie pop, indie rock
- Occupation: Singer-songwriter
- Instruments: Vocals, guitar
- Years active: 1992–present
- Label: Independent
- Formerly of: The Hekla Singers, Northern Junk, Major Maker
- Website: www.lindymusic.com

Lindy Vopnfjörð, previously credited as Lindy, is a Canadian singer-songwriter, who has performed both as a solo artist and as a member of several bands. After singing in an Icelandic folk group as a child, he co-founded the folk-rock group Northern Junk with his brother in the early 1990s, developing a following in Victoria, British Columbia. He later released several solo albums while living in Toronto, and also was a member of the indie rock band Major Maker, whose single "Rollercoaster" charted on Billboard's Canadian Hot 100 chart. His 2013 solo album, Young Waverer, had several singles chart on CBC Radio's Radio 2 Top 20 and R3-30 charts. Currently based in Hamilton, Ontario, as of 2014 he continues to tour and perform live.

== Early life ==
Lindy Vopnfjörð was born on May 26, 1972, in Winnipeg, Manitoba. His grandfather, Axel Vopnfjörð, was a prominent figure in the Icelandic Canadian community, who served as president of the Icelandic Canadian Club. His parents Len and Karen Vopnfjörð were both folk singers, and from a young age both Vopnfjörð and his brother Kris would join them in singing Icelandic songs.

His earliest experiences on stage were performing with his family's Icelandic folk group, the Hekla Singers. The family traveled around Canada playing Icelandic folksongs and dressing in traditional Icelandic costumes. Vopnfjörð began to listen to metal and punk acts such as Judas Priest and the Dead Kennedys as he grew older, and also learned about writing songs from his father, a songwriter.

== Music career ==
=== Early years ===
Northern Junk

Lindy early in his career

As teenagers Vopnfjörð and his brother moved to Victoria, British Columbia, where they learned instruments and formed the folk-rock band Northern Junk. For a time, the band was considered one of the most popular rock bands in Victoria; they were named "Best Band" by Monday Magazine in Victoria, and their song "Russian Winter" was put on regular radio rotation in Canada.

Solo albums

After moving to Toronto in 1997, he began recording solo albums and touring with noted Canadian musicians including Tegan and Sara, Melissa McClelland, and Serena Ryder.

For his 1995 debut album, Keeping Me Awake, Vopnfjörð played acoustic guitar and handled vocals, while the album was produced by Vopnfjörð and Rick May. Keeping Me Awake was recorded by John Ellis at Melodeon Studios on Vancouver Island. Among the included studio musicians were Paul Brennan on drums, Rick May on bass, and Sean Ashby on lap steel guitar. The album was released independently, was followed in 1998 by his sophomore album, Lindy. After Lindy, Vopnfjörð continued to tour, and released the album The Humorous Years in 2001.

Suspension of Disbelief (2004)

His 2004 album Suspension of Disbelief received 3/5 stars and a mixed review from Allmusic, who stated "the arrangements are varied and polished, ranging from acoustic folksiness to near-anthemic guitar pop."

=== Major Maker ===
After moving to Toronto, he co-founded the band Major Maker with composer/producer Todor Kobakov. After releasing their first album, All Illusion in 2006, the band had a breakout hit with their song "Rollercoaster", which first attracted attention in a Maynards candy commercial and went on to play on commercial radio and the Billboard Hot 100 chart. The duo went on to release two EPs, and Vopnfjörð later moved to Hamilton, Ontario.

=== Young Waverer (2013) ===
Young Waverer

Studio album by Lindy Vopnfjörð
- Released: February 26, 2013
- Recorded: Electric Ladyland Studios
- Genres: Singer-songwriter, folk, alternative
- Label: Lindy Vopnfjörð
- Producer: Todor Kobakov

Lindy Vopnfjörð chronology
| Suspension of Disbelief (2004) | Young Waverer (2013) |

His 2013 album Young Waverer was financed using crowdfunding, and released independently. Young Waverer was his first solo album to be credited to his full name rather than just Lindy. The album was produced by Major Maker's Todor Kobakov, with fellow Major Maker musicians Thomas D'Arcy, John Obercein, Steve Krecklo, and Ian LeFeuvre playing on the record. The album was mixed by Grammy-nominated John O'Mahony at Electric Ladyland Studios.

The album produced three singles that have been played on CBC Radio 2 and CBC Radio 3. "Below the Canopy" was his first #1 single on CBC Radio 3's The R3-30 charts, while "On My Way Back Home" and "Dark Matter" have broken into the Top 10 on CBC Radio 2's Radio 2 Top 20 Chart.

As of 2014 he continues to tour, and in 2013 he played a headline concert spot at the NXNE Festival in Toronto.

== Personal life ==
He is currently based in Toronto. He has a daughter, Joni, born in early 2013, and now a son, Gus, born in 2015. He had a wife named Sally.

== Discography ==
=== Solo material ===
Studio and live albums by Lindy Vopnfjörð
| Year | Album title | Release details |
|---|---|---|
| 1995 | Keeping Me Awake | Released: 1995; Format: CD |
| 1998 | Lindy | Released: Sep 15, 1998; Format: CD |
| 2001 | The Humorous Years | Released: 2001; Format: CD, digital |
| 2004 | Suspension of Disbelief | Released: Aug 3, 2004; Label: Orange Music Canada; Format: CD |
| 2013 | Young Waverer | Released: Feb 26, 2013; Label: Lindy Vopnfjörð; Format: CD, digital |
| 2016 | Frozen in Time | Released: Oct 28, 2016; Label: Lindy Vopnfjörð; Format: CD, digital |

Incomplete list of singles by Lindy Vopnfjörð
| Year | Title | Can. chart peaks | | | | Album | Certifications |
| Year | Title | CBC2 | R3-30 | | | Album | Certifications |
|---|---|---|---|---|---|---|---|
| 2013 | "Below the Canopy" | — | 1 | — | — | Young Waverer | |
| 2013 | "On My Way Back Home" | 5 | — | — | — | Young Waverer | |
| 2013 | "Dark Matter" | 5 | — | — | — | Young Waverer | |
| 2013 | "The Limit" | 1 | — | — | — | Young Waverer | Top 15 singles of 2013 on CBC Radio |

=== With Northern Junk ===
- 1993: Northern Junk by Northern Junk (Melodeon)

=== With Major Maker ===
Albums

- 2006: All Illusion
- 2007: People Carrier EP
- 2008: Funky Lady EP

Singles

- 2007: "Rollercoaster"
