= Small block (disambiguation) =

Small block or small-block may refer to:

- Small Block (EP), an album by Big Drill Car
- Small-block, a type of automobile engine block
  - Chevrolet small-block engine
  - Ford small block engine

== See also ==
- Big block
