= Kliph =

Surname list

Kliph is a given name. Notable people with the name include:

- Kliph Nesteroff, American author
- Kliph Scurlock (born 1973), American musician
