= What You Believe =

What You Believe may refer to:

- "What You Believe", song by Techno Twins
- "What You Believe", song by Orange County pop punk band Big Drill Car No Worse for the Wear 1994
- "What You Believe", song by Canadian singer Luba Between the Earth & Sky
- "What You Believe", song by Jonathan Davis from Black Labyrinth 2018

== See also ==
- "What You Believe In", song by Take That from Beautiful World
