= Toured (A Live Album) =

Live album by Big Drill Car
- Released: April 27, 1993
- Recorded: September 3, 1991
- Genre: Pop punk, Melodic hardcore
- Length: 30:32
- Label: Cargo/Headhunter Records

Big Drill Car chronology
| Batch (1991) | Toured (A Live Album) (1993) | No Worse for the Wear (1993) |

Professional ratings
Review scores
| Source | Rating |
|---|---|
| Allmusic | |

Toured (A Live Album) was a live album by Huntington Beach pop punk band Big Drill Car. The concert was recorded live at New York's CBGB's on September 3, 1991, at the beginning of a nineteen-week tour known as The Batch World Tour, in support of the then-current album Batch, but wasn't released until two years later.

This was the last recording featuring the classic original line-up of Frank Daly, Mark Arnold, Danny Marcroft and Bob Thompson.

Like many Big Drill Car albums, Toured (A Live Album) is currently out of print.

== Track listing ==
(All songs written by Arnold, Daly, Thompson unless otherwise noted)

1. "16 Lines" - 3:13
2. "Ick" - 2:39
3. "Brody" - 2:56
4. "In A Hole" (Daly) - 2:23
5. "Let Me Walk" - 2:44
6. "No Need" - 2:50
7. "Annie's Needle" (Daly, Marcroft) - 2:56
8. "Reform Before" (Daly) - 2:16
9. "Restless Habs" - 2:51
10. "If It's Poison" (Daly) - 3:01
11. "Big Shot" (Billy Joel) - 3:08

== Personnel ==
- Frank Daly - vocals
- Mark Arnold - guitar
- Bob Thomson - bass
- Danny Marcroft - drums, background vocals

Additional personnel

- Brian Lagowski - live systems engineer
- Daniel Snow - electronic equipment technician
- Anthony Binikos - electronic equipment technician
