= Alex Soria =

Canadian musician

Alex Soria (1965–2004) was a rock and roll musician and songwriter from Montreal. He was the founding member of the power pop/punk rock groups The Nils (1978–2004) and Chino (1999).

== Career ==
Soria formed The Nils at age 12.

A fan of punk rock records from bands such as The Clash, Sex Pistols, and Stiff Little Fingers, he bought himself an $80 guitar and taught himself three chords. By 1978, The Nils formed and began playing live.

In 1982, The Nils released Scratches and Needles for the BYO compilation Something to Believe In and "Call of the Wild" for the Primitive Air Raid compilation. The band began to tour extensively and issued a power pop/punk rock EP entitled Paisley in 1984.

By 1985, The Nils had befriended Ivan Doroschuk of Men Without Hats, who loaned the band $3,500 to record an EP, Sell Out Young. The album's success drew the attention of major labels and by the following year, The Nils accepted an offer from a subsidiary of Profile Records to record the self-titled LP The Nils (produced by Chris Spedding and award-winning engineer Phil Burnett). This album included updated versions of the songs "Daylight" and Inbetweens from Sell Out Young, as well as eight other original songs.

With this the band continued to get critical acclaim and set off on a second North American tour before it was being abruptly cancelled due to the label's bankruptcy. Bound by their five-year contract with the now defunct label and unable to release anything under The Nils name until the contract's expiration, the band broke up and went their separate ways.

In 1994 Mag Wheel Records released Green Fields in Daylight, a compilation of all their recordings. Later, Soria formed the band Chino in an effort to break away from The Nils and start anew. The band released the six-song EP Mala Leche in 1999 and continued to play shows but never got as much public attention as The Nils. In 2002, The Nils reformed with Carlos now on bass, and ex Flounger and Chino guitar player and close friend of Alex, Mark Donato. The band began writing new songs and Soria finally seemed hopeful that this could be their second chance.

== Death ==
On December 13, 2004, at the age of 39, Soria ended his life on a train track near his home in Montreal.

== Legacy ==
Months after his death, musicians including Chris Spedding and John Kastner (Doughboys, Asexuals) held a sold out tribute concert in his name. In 2006, the owner of a Montreal record shop released the album Next Of Kin, featuring unreleased acoustic four-track recordings by Alex.

"They really made punk grow up in Canada", guitarist John Campbell said of The Nils. "Just as The Replacements are credited with giving punk a more mature sound in the States, The Nils really were responsible for making that happen here." In 2015, Shadows & Ghosts was released, mixed by Phil Burnett (Laurie Anderson, Steely Dan). Lemonheads vocalist Evan Dando and Kastner made appearances on the album. "The album is shockingly great".

On June 1, 2024, Kastner announced a June 6 performance with a re-formed version of The Nils at the Bovine Sex Club in Toronto.
