= CD Type Thing =

Studio album by Big Drill Car
- Released: 1989
- Recorded: June – July 1989
- Genre: Punk rock; pop-punk
- Length: 23:19
- Label: Cruz
- Producer: Stephen Egerton; Richard Andrews

Big Drill Car chronology
| Small Block (EP) (1988) | CD Type Thing (1989) | Batch (1991) |

Professional ratings
Review scores
| Source | Rating |
|---|---|
| AllMusic | 4/5 stars |

CD Type Thing is the first album by American punk rock band Big Drill Car, released in 1989. Many consider this album to be a classic of the late '80s hardcore punk scene, and the peak of Big Drill Car's career.

The title of the album changed with the format it was presented on: the compact disc version was entitled CD Type Thing, the vinyl format was called Album Type Thing, and the audio cassette version was called Tape Type Thing. The gimmick is similar to that of Public Image Ltd.'s 1986 album, Album.

== Track listing ==
(All tracks written by Arnold, Daly unless noted otherwise)

1. "16 Lines" (Arnold, Daly, Thomson) – 2:52
2. "Clamato #11" (Daly) – 1:30
3. "No Need" – 2:52
4. "Brody" (Arnold, Daly, Thomson) – 2:56
5. "In Green Fields" – 2:19
6. "Diamond Earrings" – 3:24
7. "Reform Before" (Daly) – 2:11
8. "Head On" (Daly, Thomson) – 2:21
9. "Swanson" (Arnold, Daly, Thomson) – 1:35
10. "About Us" – 2:13

== Personnel ==
- Frank Daly - Vocals
- Mark Arnold - Guitar
- Bob Thomson - Bass, Art Direction, Artwork
- Danny Marcroft - drums

Additional personnel

- Stephen Egerton - Producer
- Richard Andrews - Engineer, Producer
