= Go (radio show) =

Go!
- Genre: entertainment
- Running time: 90 minutes
- Country of origin: Canada
- Language(s): English
- Home station: CBC Radio One
- Hosted by: Brent Bambury
- Original release: 2002 – 2010

Go! was a Saturday morning entertainment show on the Radio One network of the Canadian Broadcasting Corporation that ran from 2002 to 2010, hosted by Brent Bambury. The show included interviews, music, live performances, and comedy bits.

The show first aired as a summer series in 2002, concurrently with Bambury's stint as host of All in a Day, the network's local afternoon program in Ottawa. Following a second summer run in 2003, the show was added to the network's regular year-round schedule that fall.

The show was produced in Ottawa before moving to Toronto in 2005. After 2004, most episodes were broadcast in front of a live studio audience.

According to Bambury, "we wanted to do a show that wasn't about anything, so every week was a voyage of discovery to figure out what it was about. But what it was really about was that you didn't have to think very hard. You didn't have to feel smart about anything to listen to it. It was the opposite of a CBC show." The show's format commonly took the form of a pop culture contest of some type. For example, three celebrities would compete against each other in a trivia match, or celebrity judges would evaluate amateur stand-up comedians or celebrity impersonators. Early in the show's run, this included a consistent regular feature titled Groove Shinny, which set a Canadian musician against a "perfect musical mind" (Richard Crouse) and a "perfect stranger", for a music trivia match. At other times, the show would simply broadcast offbeat comedy and entertainment segments, such as guests singing Bible passages or a comedic mock kidnapping of Governor General Adrienne Clarkson.

Regulars included Nana aba Duncan who appeared in an audience participation features titled "Contest Nana", in which she presented an audio montage of soundclips which listeners can e-mail the show to identify. The feature was previously hosted by comedian Sabrina Jalees. Kliph Nesteroff hosted a segment titled "That Time of the Month", showcasing unintentionally funny audio ephemera from the 1950s, 1960s and 1970s. A live musical guest also often appeared, performing three or four numbers during the course of the show.

The last episode of the show aired on June 26, 2010. In September, Bambury launched a new public affairs magazine show, Day 6, in the same time slot. Go's weekly listener montage contest was retained on Day 6 as "Riffed from the Headlines".
