= Batch (album) =

Studio album by Big Drill Car
- Released: 1991
- Recorded: January – February 1991
- Genre: Punk rock; pop-punk
- Length: 27:38
- Label: Cruz
- Producer: Bill Stevenson, Stephen Egerton

Big Drill Car chronology
CD Type Thing (1989)	Batch (1991)	Toured (A Live Album) (1993)

Batch is the second album by American punk rock band Big Drill Car. It was released in 1991.

It was the last studio recording with the original line-up, and their last album distributed by Cruz Records. "Freedom of Choice" is a cover of the Devo song.

== Critical reception ==
Professional ratings
Review scores
Source	Rating
AllMusic	2/5 stars

Trouser Press wrote that "Batch upholds the group’s stylistic consistency: riffs, tunes and punchy rhythms collide in an enjoyable blend of big rock, vampy thrashfunk and nicely detailed pop that hardly belongs on a punk-rooted indie label." The Los Angeles Times wrote that "there is no denying the clean, unrelenting crunch that guitarist Mark Arnold, bassist Bob Thomson and drummer Danny Marcroft achieve as they find hard-rocking middle ground between Led Zeppelin and Husker Du."

== Track listing ==
1. "Take Away" (Arnold, Daly, Smooth, Thomson) - 2:38
2. "Restless Habs" (Arnold, Daly, Thomson) - 2:51
3. "If It's Poison" (Daly) - 2:59
4. "Freep" (Arnold, Daly, Thomson) - 3:30
5. "Never Ending Endeavor" (Daly, Thomson) - 2:48
6. "In a Hole" (Daly) - 2:23
7. "Crust" (Daly, Thomson) - 1:51
8. "Freedom of Choice" (Mothersbaugh, Casale) - 2:35
9. "Ick" (Arnold, Daly, Thomson) - 2:37
10. "Faster" (Daly) - 5:26

== Credits ==
- Frank Daly - Vocals
- Mark Arnold - Guitar
- Bob Thomson - Bass, album art
- Danny Marcroft - Drums, background vocals
- Rich Cranium - Guitar solo on 'Ick'

Additional personnel

- Bill Stevenson - Producer
- Stephen Egerton - Engineer, Producer
- Anthony Arvizu - Assistant Engineer, Second Engineer
- Steve McNeil - Assistant Engineer, Second Engineer
- Recorded and Mixed at Mambo Sound and Recording, Long Beach, CA
