= Derivative Records =

Canadian record label

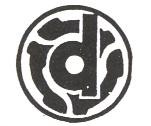
- Founded: 1992
- Founder: Patti Schmidt, Kevin Komoda
- Defunct: 1999
- Genre: Alternative rock Indie rock
- Country of origin: Canada
- Location: Montreal, Quebec

Derivative Records was a Canadian independent record label, founded in 1992, in Montréal, Québec by Patti Schmidt and Kevin Komoda. The label was originally founded as "a cassette & 7-inch only-label." As demand and production ramped up to include other areas such as the United States and Europe, the label brought in Pat Hamou and Genevieve Heistek to help out. Artists in which the label had releases by were both international-based artists, such as Chicago's Number One Cup, London's Spool, and Switzerland's Sportsguitar, as well as Canadian-based, such as Eric's Trip, jale, Pest 5000, and Shadowy Men On A Shadowy Planet.

In April 1995, the label hosted an anniversary party for their 2-year anniversary of their first official release. Artists who performed at the showcase were Broken Girl, Spool, Ruby Falls, and Spiny Anteaters.

The label ceased operations in 1997.

== Releases and artists ==
Duh 000 - Asexuals - Love Goes Plaid / Beautiful (7") (1993) (co-assisted in distribution)

duh 001 - Shadowy Men On A Shadowy Planet - Take Outs (7") (1993)

duh 002 - Trenchmouth / Bliss - The Position Of The Right Hand (7") (1993)

DUH003 - Bite - Because Girls Would Love To Have A Friend To Dance With (Cass) (1993)

DUH004 - Bellybutton Lint - The First Four (Cass) (1993)

DUH005 - Good Cookies - Four Songs (Cass) (1993)

duh 006 - Jale - Sort of Grey (7", Single) (1993)

duh 007 - Pest 5000 - Pest Plays No. 817 The Visible Trout (Cass, EP) (1993)

duh 008 - Chicken Milk - Live In Spane (Cass, EP) (1993)

Duh 009 - Spool - Pieces Of Post (Cass) (1993)

DUH 010 - Bite - Canker (7") (1993)

DUH011 - Eric's Trip - Warm Girl (7", EP) (1993)

DUH 012 - Good Cookies - Have You Fire (CD) (1994)

DUH013 - Spool - Callous Makers (7") (1994)

DUH014 - Pest 5000 - Patti Christ Superstar (2x7", EP) (1994)

duh 015 - Moon Socket - Socket To Me (Cass) (1994)

DUH016 - Slow Loris - Palentine (7", EP) (1994)

DUH017 - Bite - Funbuns (7") (1994)

PET001 - Various - The Pet Series Vol. 1--Booger (Cass, Comp) (1994)

DUH018 - Grifters - Stream (7", Single) (1995)

DUH019 - Sportsguitar - He's So Funny (7") (1995)

DUH020 - Jad Fair & Phono-Comb - In A Haunted House (7") (1995)

duhcd015 - Moon Socket - Moon Socket (CD) (1995)

DUH-021 - Starbean / Saturnine / The Ladybug Transistor / Blaise Pascal (3) - Boobytrap! Volume One (2x7", Comp) (April 1996)

DUH022 - Pest 5000 - Cold Feet (7", Single) (1996)

DUHCD 023 - Sportsguitar - Fade / Cliché (CD, LP) (1996

DUH024 - Number One Cup - Malcolm's X-Ray Picnic (7") (1996)

duh025 - Pest 5000 - (In-ter/a-bang/) (CD) (1996)

DUH 026 - Starbean - Refuting The Extraterrestrial Hypothesis (CD) (1997)

DUH027 - Pest 5000 - Palimpsest (CD, Comp) (1997)
