= John Kastner =

Canadian musician and composer (born 1969)

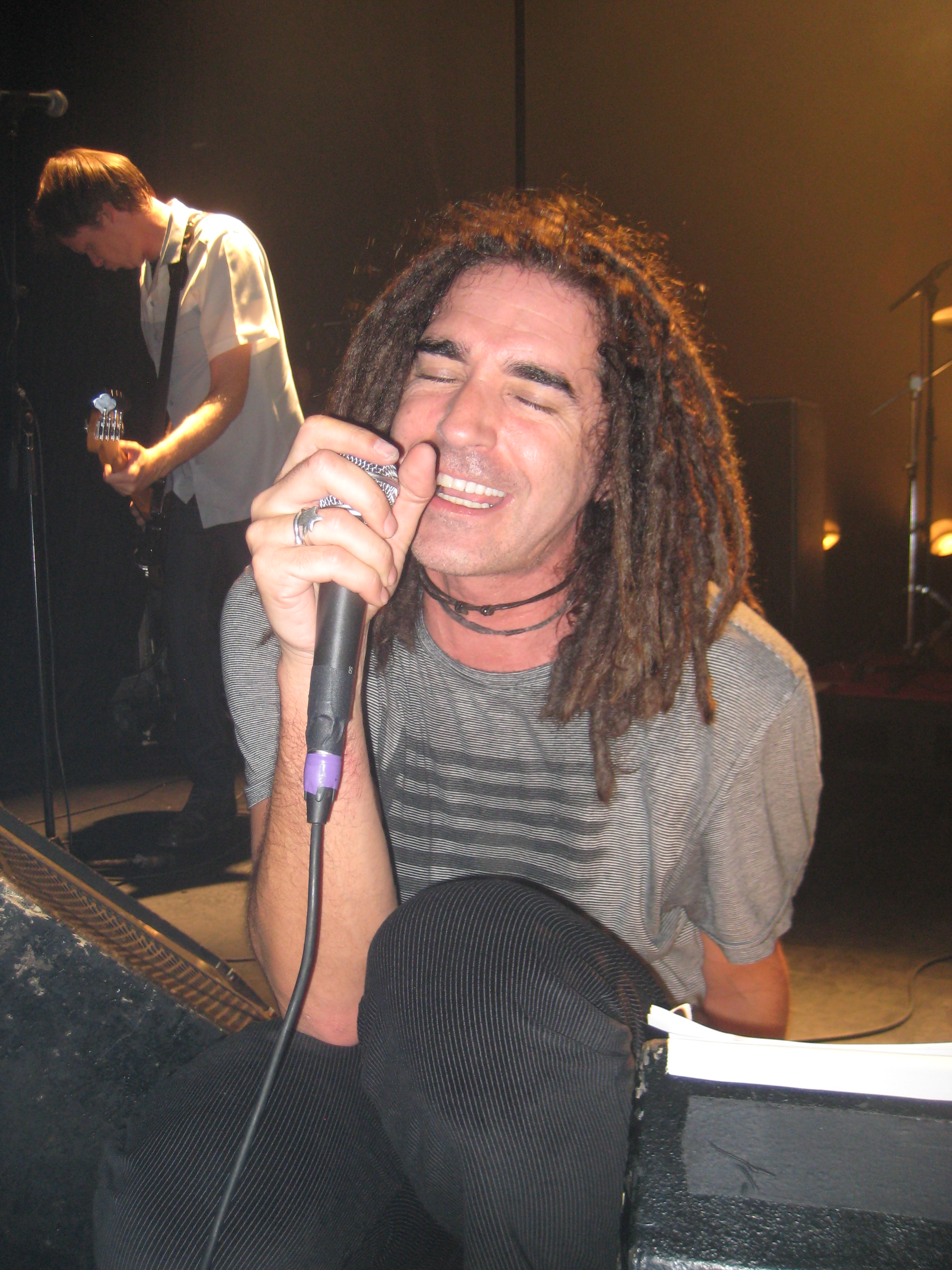
- Kastner playing with The Asexuals in October 2010

Background information
- Born: Jean-Guy Kastner; 12 August 1969 (age 57); Island of Montreal, Quebec, Canada
- Genres: Hardcore punk; alternative rock
- Occupations: Musician; songwriter
- Instruments: Guitar, vocals
- Years active: 1983–present
- Labels: Psyche Industry; Enigma; A&M

Jean-Guy "John" Kastner (born 12 August 1969) is a Canadian musician and composer. He was the singer for Montreal hardcore punk band the Asexuals as well as singer-guitarist for Montreal alternative band Doughboys and alternative band All Systems Go!. He is also the manager and former rhythm guitarist for the band Men Without Hats.

== Early life ==
Kastner was born in Beaconsfield, Quebec, to Charles Kastner and Kathryn Ann Watt. He had been interested in rock 'n' roll since elementary school. By the time he was 9 years old, he was following musicians who worked in downtown Montreal and who performed at the Forum.

== Career ==
Kastner joined the Asexuals in 1983 and recorded a 7-inch and two LPs with them before quitting in 1987, over musical differences. While a member of the Asexuals, he fronted the band and helped the Montreal hardcore scene become well known outside the city through the frequent tours the group made in Canada, the United States and Europe.

Between 1990 and 1992, he played rhythm guitar in Men Without Hats, recording on their album Sideways.

After leaving the Asexuals, he started the Doughboys, releasing seven albums from 1987 to 1996. The band broke up in 1996 and Kastner moved to California; he established himself in Silverlake and started writing music for soundtracks.

In 1998, he started the band All Systems Go! with Frank Daly and Mark Arnold of Big Drill Car and released five albums and EPs from 1999 to 2003 before going on a hiatus in 2005. They released another album in 2007, then went on another hiatus. Kastner also recorded and released the 2006 album entitled "Have you seen Lucky?", which featured a number of his previous bandmates.

Kastner wrote music for many movies and TV show soundtracks, including Phil the Alien, Universal Soldier: The Return and Brats of the Lost Nebula. and collaborated on records by Mega City Four, The Weekend, Mark Lanegan Band and Men Without Hats.

In 2008, John joined Bran Van 3000 as guitar player and in 2010 reunited with the Asexuals to play a show in Montreal.

In 2010, he appeared in the documentary Open Your Mouth And Say... Mr. Chi Pig, a Canadian film about the life of SNFU singer Mr. Chi Pig directed by Sean Patrck Shaul and released by Prairie Coast Films.

== Personal life ==
Kastner married actress Nicole de Boer on 18 December 1999. They have a daughter. In 2012, Kastner and De Boer separated, and later divorced.

In May 2013, Kastner began dating actress Jessica Paré. Subsequently Paré gave birth to a son.

Kastner has a sister and a brother. On 26 March 2008, Kastner's mother Kathryn Ann Watt died of cancer.

== Discography ==
=== Asexuals ===
- Featuring: The Asexuals (Og Music, 1984)
- Be What You Want (First Strike Records, 1984) (Psyche-Industry, 1985)
- Contemporary World (Psyche Industry, 1985)

=== Doughboys ===
- La Majeure (Scamindy Records, Boss Tuneage Records1987/2003)
- Whatever (MTL Records, 1987)
- Home Again (Restless Records, 1988)
- Happy Accidents (Restless Records, 1990)
- When Up Turns to Down (Emergo Records, 1991)
- Crush (A&M Records, 1993)
- Turn Me On (A&M Records, 1996)

=== All Systems Go! ===
- All Systems Go! (Cobraside Distribution, 1999)
- I'll Be Your Radio (Cobraside Distribution, 2001, EP)
- Mon Chi Chi (Bad Taste Records, 2002)
- Fascination Unknown (Bad Taste Records, 2003, EP)
- Tell Vicky (Bad Taste Records, 2003, EP)
- A Late Night Snack (iTunes, 2007)

=== Solo ===
- Have You Seen Lucky? (Boss Tuneage, 2006)

=== Bran Van 3000 ===
- The Garden (Audiogram, 2010)
