= All Systems Go! =

Canadian punk rock band (1998–2006)

- Origin: Toronto, Canada
- Genres: Punk rock; alternative rock; power pop; pop punk
- Years active: 1998–2006
- Labels: Bad Taste; Coldfront
- Members: Frank Daly; Mark Arnold; John Kastner; Peter Arsenault; Thomas D'Arcy; Karl Alvarez; Dean Dallas Bentley; Matt Taylor
- Website: asgcentral.com (defunct)

All Systems Go! was a Canadian punk rock supergroup with members from Big Drill Car, Doughboys, the Asexuals, The Carnations, Descendents, C'mon and The Weakerthans.

== History ==
The band was formed after Mark Arnold and Frank Daly's previous band Big Drill Car broke up in 1995, and John Kastner and Peter Arsenault's previous band, the Doughboys, broke up in 1996. Kastner and Arnold were long-time friends from Montreal who decided it was time to play together; they moved to Toronto, and recruited drummer Matt Taylor and singer to round out the group.

== All Systems Go!, 1998–2001 ==
The band made their debut at the 1998 North By Northeast Music Conference in Toronto, during a break in recording their first album. That summer, they also played the Toronto Warped Tour, and a concert at the Molson Centre in Barrie, Ontario (now Park Place (Ontario)), opening for Pearl Jam (who were on their Yield Tour), along with Cheap Trick, Cracker, Hayden, and Matthew Good Band.

The album, All Systems Go!, was released in 1999. It was produced by Daniel Rey, producer for the Ramones, and includes the song "Subzero", which Rey wrote with Dee Dee Ramone. The album's production was financed by Kastner, with money he made from scoring films. The album blended hard rock, punk, vocal harmonies and Arnold's guitar work, and elements of Doughboys and Big Drill Car are evident.

In 2000, Frank Daly left the band and was replaced by Thomas D'Arcy (from The Carnations) on bass and vocals. Matt Taylor also left and was replaced by C'mon drummer Dean Dallas Bentley.

== Mon Chi Chi, 2002–2004 ==
For their second album, Mon Chi Chi, Kastner and D'Arcy contributed to the songwriting and vocal leads but there were several other contributors, including singers Jonathan Cummins (Doughboys), Pete Stahl (Queens of the Stone Age), Leonard Phillips (The Dickies), and Melissa Auf der Maur. The band co-wrote their hit "Tell Vicki" with Daniel Rey, "Fascination Unknown" with Greg Dulli, and "Running Blind" with Kastner's former band-mate, Ivan Doroschuk from Men Without Hats. The album was released in 2002 on Bad Taste Records and the band went on a European tour in support of it.

In 2003, the band performed on the television show Open Mike with Mike Bullard. They also played Belgium's Dour Festival.

Thomas D'Arcy left the band shortly thereafter and was replaced by Karl Alvarez of (The Descendents). This line-up toured briefly but did not produce a studio album.

In 2006, the band's song "Tell Vicki" appeared in the film Firewall.

In 2006, All Systems Go! released A Late Night Snack on iTunes; this was a collection of outtakes and unreleased songs from the band's time together.

== Members ==
- Mark Arnold - guitars (see also Big Drill Car)
- John Kastner - vocals, guitars (see also Asexuals and Doughboys)
- Matt Taylor - drums, backing vocals
- Dean Dallas Bentley - drums (see also C'mon)
- Frank Daly - Bass (see also Big Drill Car)
- Peter Arsenault - guitar (see also the Doughboys)
- Thomas D'Arcy - bass (see also The Carnations)
- Karl Alvarez - bass (see also Descendents))

== Discography ==
=== Albums ===
- All Systems Go!, Coldfront Records 1999
- Mon Chi Chi, Bad Taste Records 2002
- A Late Night Snack, Independent 2006

=== EPs ===
- I'll Be Your Radio, Bad Taste Records 2000
- Promo 2001, Bad Taste Records 2001
- Fascination Unknown, Bad Taste Records 2002
- Promo 2002, Bad Taste Records 2002
- Tell Vicki, Bad Taste Records 2003
