= Augusta La Paix =

Canadian radio personality

- Born: Halifax
- Known for: Radio personality and film narrator
- Notable work: Brave New Waves

Augusta La Paix is a former Canadian radio personality, best known as the original host and co-creator of Brave New Waves.

Originally from Halifax, Nova Scotia, La Paix worked in Montreal as a freelance news reporter for CBC Radio and an occasional guest host of Morningside. She was given Brave New Waves in 1984 after submitting a demo tape for a show on avant garde culture, featuring music by Laurie Anderson, Brian Eno, Klaus Nomi and Nina Hagen. In an early interview with The Globe and Mail, she told the newspaper that she was only a recent convert to underground music, having previously been primarily a fan of country music.

She left Brave New Waves in 1985, after one season, and moved on to other roles with the CBC, including stints as host of Cross Country Checkup, Two New Hours, Arts National and Home Run, the network's local afternoon program in Montreal.

She also narrated a number of documentary films in the 1980s and 1990s, including Canada's First Woman MP (a short by the NFB about Agnes Macphail), Adam's World, Just Before the Dawn, When the Day Comes (From Studio D about elder care) and Latin America: The Thirsty Cities.
