= Nobro =

Canadian garage punk band

- Origin: Montreal, Quebec, Canada
- Genre: Garage punk
- Years active: 2014–present
- Labels: Big Scary Monsters; Brain Gum; Dine Alone; Geertruida
- Members: Kathryn McCaughey; Karolane Carbonneau; Andy Silver; Josée Caron; Tara Cohen
- Past members: Martha Rodriguez; Marianna Florczyk; Gabrielle La Rue; Sarah Dion; Lisandre Bourdages
- Website: nobroband.com

Nobro (capitalized as NOBRO) is a Canadian garage punk band based in Montreal, Quebec. The band was formed by vocalist and bass guitarist Kathryn McCaughey (formerly of Uncle Bad Touch), vocalist and guitarist Marianna Florczyk, and vocalist and drummer Martha Rodriguez in mid-2014. Sarah Dion replaced Rodriguez in 2015, and Florczyk departed in May 2017 to be replaced by Gabrielle La Rue, who joined at the same time as keyboardist and percussionist Lisandre Bourdages. Karolane Carbonneau replaced La Rue in November 2018.

== Releases ==
The band self-released a three-song demo in November 2014, and followed-up with its debut extended play, Stoke Level: High!, released after several months of delay through Canadian record label Brain Gum Records in April 2016. Dutch record label Geertruida released a European edition of Stoke Level: High! in September 2016. After recording eight songs in February 2016, the band announced that it would release its debut LP, Sick Hustle, in 2018, but it was delayed and only some of the songs were ultimately released in a cut-down EP version two years later. In May 2018, the band released the single "The Kids Are Back".

In January 2020, Nobro was simultaneously signed to Canadian record label Dine Alone Records (after years of courtship from the company) and British record label Big Scary Monsters Recording Company, announcing the release of Sick Hustle as a four-song extended play, due out in April 2020. The band had recorded six songs with producer Thomas D'Arcy for the release. In February 2022, the band released another extended play through Dine Alone and Big Scary Monsters, Live Your Truth Shred Some Gnar, which was also produced by Thomas D'Arcy. Live Your Truth Shred Some Gnar was recorded in August 2020, but the band held off on releasing it while waiting out the COVID-19 pandemic.

In 2023, the band released their debut full-length record Set Your Pussy Free. In 2024, the album was a shortlisted nominee for the 2024 Polaris Music Prize, and in 2025, the album won the Juno for Rock Album of the Year.

== Tours ==
Nobro has done several weekend trips with New Swears, and has toured with Fidlar and Dilly Dally in September 2018, PUP and Charly Bliss in October 2019, Alexisonfire, The Distillers and Pussy Riot in January 2020, Tokyo Police Club in November 2021, Billy Talent, Anti-Flag, PUP and Rise Against in February, April and May 2022, The OBGMs in June 2022, PUP and Pom Pom Squad in October 2022 and L7 in November 2026.

== Band members ==
Current

- Kathryn McCaughey – vocals, bass guitar (2014–present)
- Karolane Carbonneau – guitar, vocals (2018–present)
- Andy Silver – drums (2025–present)
- Josée Caron – guitar (2025–present)
- Tara Cohen – keyboard, percussion (2025–present)

Former

- Martha Rodriguez – vocals, drums (2014–2015)
- Marianna Florczyk – vocals, guitar (2014–2017)
- Gabrielle La Rue – guitar (2017–2018)
- Sarah Dion – drums (2015–2025)
- Lisandre Bourdages – keyboard, percussion (2017–2025)

== Discography ==
Studio albums

- Set Your Pussy Free (Dine Alone, 2023)

EPs

- Stoke Level: High! (Brain Gum / Geertruida, 2016)
- Sick Hustle (Dine Alone, 2020)
- Live Your Truth Shred Some Gnar (Dine Alone / Big Scary Monsters, 2022)

== Awards and nominations ==
Year	Award	Category	Nominee/Work	Result	Ref
2025	Juno Awards	Rock Album of the Year	Set Your Pussy Free	Won	
