= Big Drill Car =

American punk rock band

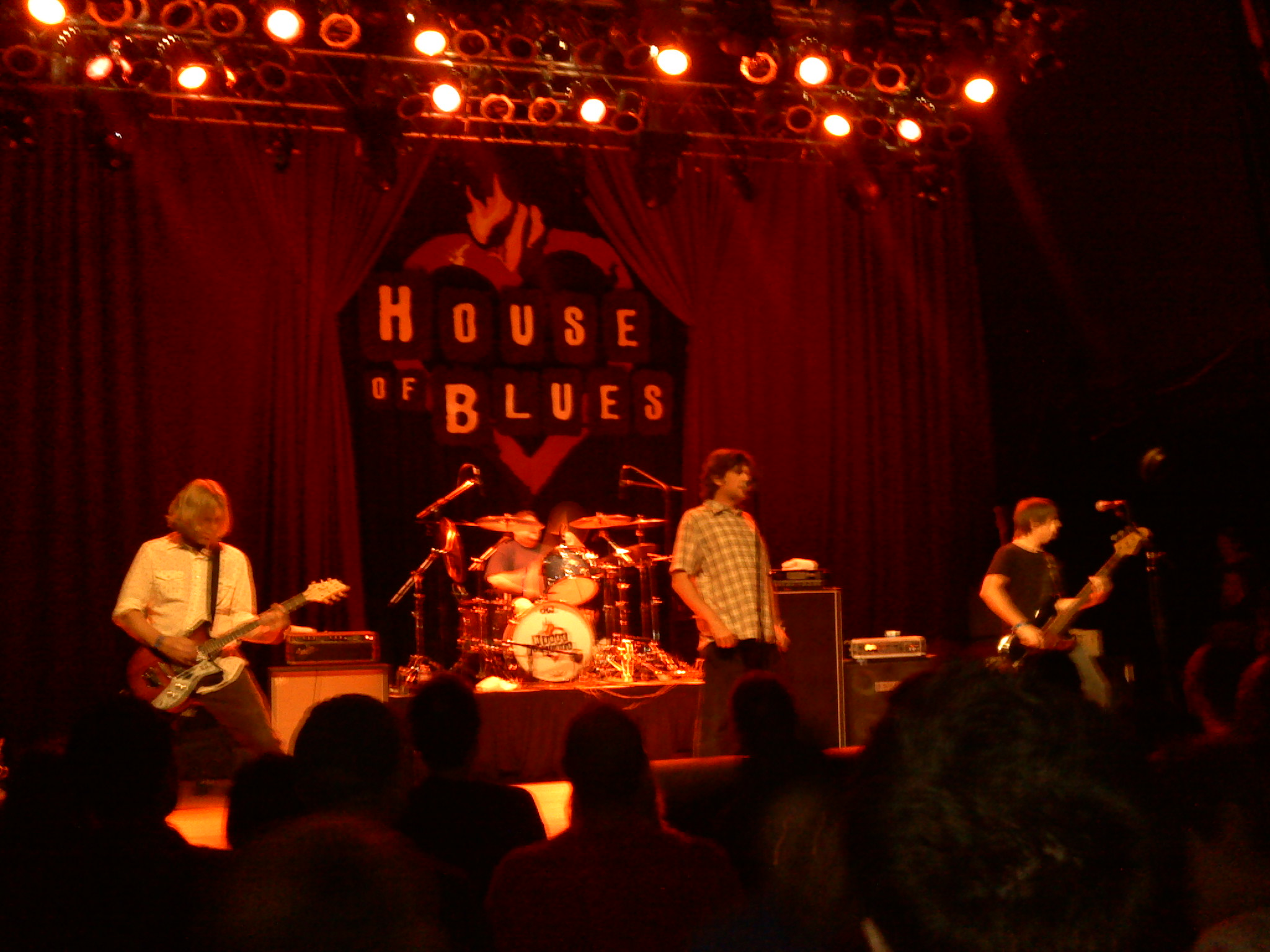
- Big Drill Car in 2009. Left to right: Arnold, Marcroft, Daly, and Thomson

Background information
- Origin: Costa Mesa, California, U.S.
- Genres: Punk rock, pop punk, melodic hardcore
- Years active: 1987–1995, 2008–2009, 2016–present
- Labels: Varient, Cruz, Cargo/Headhunter
- Members: Frank Daly; Mark Arnold; Bob Thomson; Danny Marcroft
- Past members: Darren Morris; Keith Fallis
- Website: bigdrillcar.com

Big Drill Car is a punk rock group from Costa Mesa, California, formed in 1987. While the group never gained a mainstream audience, they provided an influence on their contemporaries – most notably ALL, Chemical People and Dag Nasty – alongside of which they are considered early pioneers of melodic hardcore.

Big Drill Car released an EP, Small Block, in 1988 before being signed to Cruz Records (owned by former Black Flag guitarist Greg Ginn) and releasing two studio albums. The band eventually parted ways with that label and signed to Headhunter Records, who released Toured: A Live Album and No Worse for the Wear, the band's last album to date.

Big Drill Car broke up in 1995, but reunited for a one-off series of shows in 2008 and 2009, with the classic original line-up. They released a CD/Double LP on Varient (their own label) and Boss Tuneage (in Europe) called Never Ending Endeavour which featured 5 new songs and 15 bonus tracks including the entire No Worse for the Wear record's demos featuring original drummer Danny Marcroft (the future release of No Worse For The Wear on Headhunter featured new drummer Keith Fallis). The band reunited with this lineup again in 2016, and they have continued playing shows sporadically since then.

== History ==
=== "Classic" original lineup-era (1987-1991) ===
Big Drill Car was formed in 1987 while Frank Daly and Mark Arnold were in M.I.A.; the pair had written some songs that were not M.I.A.-style songs so they got together with some friends (Bob and Danny) and started playing around. Their first shows were a mix of covers (like the Descendents' "I'm Not A Loser" and Dead Kennedys' "Too Drunk to Fuck") and these new originals songs. After M.I.A. broke up, Big Drill Car entered the studio in 1988 to record the EP Small Block. They were a hard working hard touring band who were rough on their tour vans.

While touring with M.I.A., Frank and Mark met and played with The Descendents. After M.I.A. broke up and the Descendents became ALL the bands started playing locally and touring together. After "signing" with Greg Ginn's newly formed Cruz Records, Stephen Egerton (guitar ALL/Descendents) and Bill Stevenson (drums ALL/Descendents/Black Flag) started up working with Big Drill Car in the studio to record their debut album, Album/Tape/CD Type Thing, which was released in 1989.

=== Final years (1992–1995) ===
After the release of their second album, Batch, Big Drill Car parted ways with the now-"classic" original line-up. Bob had announced that he was leaving the band to play in another band, Xtra Large, who was on the verge of a major label deal. The show was at the PALACE in Los Angeles. It was the biggest of the "VIVA CRUZ" shows (annual shows, show casing the Cruz bands ALL, Big Drill Car and Chemical People). Bob was more active and animated on stage that night than ever before. Bob was replaced by Darren Morris. Darren fit in perfectly - he was a big fan, a super nice guy and he knew all the songs already. Not long after Darren joined the band, Danny left. Danny was replaced by a few drummers including Jamie Reidling (Cadillac Tramps/US Bombs) and Keith Fallis (former drummer for Carnival Art). They went on to release 2 more records with Keith in the band Cargo Records, Toured (A Live Album) which was an earlier recording with the original lineup and No Worse for the Wear, which Keith plays on. While No Worse for the Wear still never broke the band into mainstream audiences, the release of the album would gain Big Drill Car a little success and supporting slots on national and world tours with bands such as The Offspring (who had just released Smash to unexpected success and acclaim) and Guttermouth. After this, Big Drill Car broke up in 1995.

=== Post-breakup (1996–2007) ===
After breaking up, Frank Daly (vocalist) and Mark Arnold (guitarist) joined forces with John Kastner (Doughboys/Asexuals) to form the band All Systems Go!.

Arnold is currently working as a sound engineer, recently working for Lemonheads/Jesus and Mary Chain/Breeders/Rocket from the Crypt/Band of Horses.

Daly worked as a guitar tech for Rocket from the Crypt for a while, then went on to tour manage Reel Big Fish before settling down, getting married and having a family.

=== Reunions (2008–2016) ===
On May 23, 2008, it was reported on Punknews.org that Big Drill Car (with the classic Small Block lineup) was reuniting for a series of reunion shows in August, taking place at Huntington Beach's Fitzgerald's Pub and two Southern California dates on the 2008 Warped Tour. Big Drill Car also headlined Riot Fest 2008, which took place on October 10–12 in Chicago, Illinois.

Asked in August 2008 what was next for Big Drill Car, bassist Bob Thomson stated, "I can 100% guarantee there will be no tour, we're all dads with jobs. It is not easy to co ordinate shows as Frank lives in Indiana (Frank lives in California as of 2016), so the best we can hope for is a show here and there." This led many to believe that Big Drill Car could be ending their reunion.

Despite the statement Bob made, Big Drill Car reconvened in the summer of 2009 for shows with All. Also in 2009, they released a rarities album called A Never Ending Endeavor, which also featured some new material.

2008 also marked the first time any of their music was available on iTunes.

In January 2016, Big Drill Car played a one-off reunion show in Costa Mesa. They are still active as of November 2017, and play shows mostly around Southern California.

Big Drill Car's last show was December 8, 2017 with the Adolescents and CH3 at The Observatory in Orange County, CA

== Line-ups ==
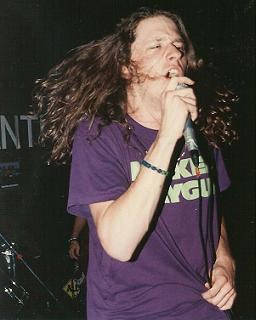
Frank Daly at the AntiClub 1990

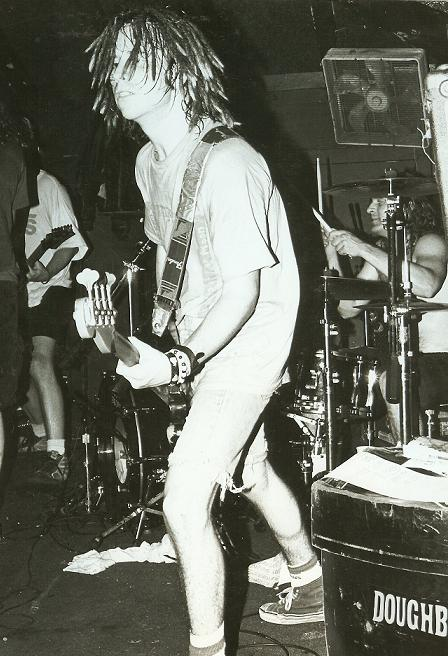
Bob Thomson at the AntiClub 1990

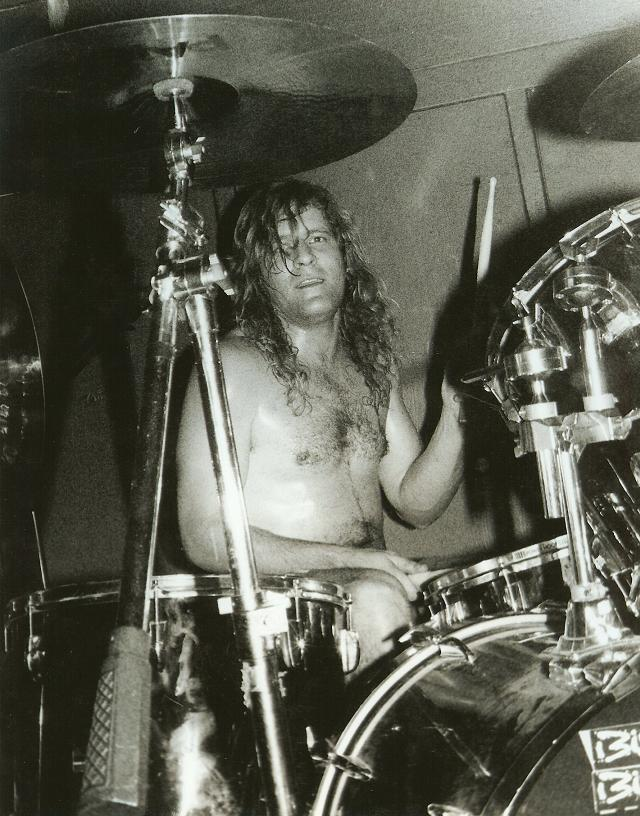
Danny Marcroft c. 1990

(1987–1992) Classic lineup	Frank Daly — vocals; Mark Arnold — guitar; Bob Thomson — bass; Danny Marcroft — drums
(1992–1995)	Frank Daly — vocals; Mark Arnold — guitar; Darren Morris — bass; Keith Fallis — drums
(1995–2008)	(Band inactive)
(2008–2009) Reunion of "classic" original lineup	Frank Daly — vocals; Mark Arnold — guitar; Bob Thomson — bass; Danny Marcroft — drums
(2009–2016)	(Band inactive)
(2016–present) Reunion of "classic" original lineup	Frank Daly — vocals; Mark Arnold — guitar; Bob Thomson — bass; Danny Marcroft — drums

== Discography ==
=== Studio Albums and EPs ===
- Small Block EP (1988), Varient Records! (re-issued on Cruz Records in 1990)
- CD Type Thing (1989, Cruz Records)
- Batch (1991, Cruz Records)
- Toured (A Live Album) (1993, Cargo/Headhunter Records)
- No Worse for the Wear (1994, Cargo/Headhunter Records)
- A Never Ending Endeavor (2009, Varient Records!)

=== 7" Singles ===
- "Surrender/Getaway" (split w/ Chemical People) (1991, Cruz Records)
- "The Snapperhead E.P." split w/ Thud! (1992, Blackbox Records)
- "No Worse for the Wear/Black Country Rock" (1994, Stab You in the Back/Truk Records)
- "Nothin' At All/Trash the House" (1994, Goldenrod Records)

=== Compilation Appearances ===
- Cruz Sampler 7" (1991) - "Restless Habs"
- The Big One: City of L.A. Power (1991) - "A Take Away"
- Something's Gone Wrong Again: The Buzzcocks Covers Compilation (1992) - "I Don't Mind"
- 13 Back-Ordered Hits (1993) - "16 Lines"
- Blackbox Sampler (1993) - "Big Shot (live)"
- Case Closed? An International Compilation of Husker Du Cover Songs (1993) - "Celebrated Summer"
- By The Banks of the Mighty Santa Ana, Vol. II (1994) - "Song No. 40"
- Super Mixer (1996) - "Nothin' At All"
- Keep the Beat (1996) - "Celebrated Summer"
- O.C.'s 5400 Day Revolution (1999) - "Big Shot (studio version)"

== Known associates ==
- Darin Oosthuizen - road manager/roadie
- Greg Jacobs - manager
- Stormy Shepherd - booking agent
- Doug Mann - road manager/ batch tour
