= Ian Stephens (poet) =

Canadian poet

Ian Stephens (1955 – March 22, 1996) was a Canadian poet, journalist and musician from Montreal, Quebec, best known as one of the major Canadian voices in the spoken word movement of the 1990s. Most of his work focused on his experiences living with AIDS.

Stephens studied at Bishop's University and Concordia University.

In 1984, Stephens released a 45 RPM single with band Disappointed a Few People, titled Fuck With Christ, on Les Disques Noirs, followed in 1986 by album Dead in Love, on Psyche Industry Records. The group disbanded in 1988.

In 1992, Stephens released a spoken word CD, Wining Dining Drilling, which featured his poetry with a punk rock-influenced musical backing. The album included tracks such as "Coroner Wants a Kiss," "Loser w/ a Hard-On," "Sex is Dog," "Queer in Amerika", "I Started to Get Sick in New York" and "The AIDS Guy". He published a book of poetry, Diary of a Trademark, in 1994; the following year, he released an album of the same title, featuring his recitations of many of the pieces in the book. The title track was later included on Word Up, a compilation of spoken word poetry.

Stephens was also a regular writer for the Montreal Mirror, contributing book reviews and a 1994 cover story, "A Weary State of Grace", on living with AIDS. He had begun writing a novel, although it was not completed before his death.

He died in 1996 of AIDS-related lymphoma.
