= Small Block (EP) =

EP by Big Drill Car
- Released: Original: 1988; Re-release: 1990
- Recorded: June 1988
- Genre: Punk rock, pop punk, melodic hardcore
- Length: 15:50
- Label: Varient Records! (original); Cruz Records (re-release)
- Producer: Stephen Egerton; Richard Andrews

Big Drill Car chronology
Small Block (1988)	CD Type Thing (1989)

Professional ratings
Review scores
Source	Rating
AllMusic	3/5 stars

Small Block is the debut EP of the Huntington Beach pop punk band Big Drill Car, released in 1988 on their own Varient Records! label and again in 1990 on Cruz Records.

To save money on mastering, Big Drill Car placed all six tracks on the A-side of the record, not only to let the B-side remain shiny and smooth, but also to save listeners the annoyance of having to flip the record over after seven minutes. When asked why the vinyl version of this EP would have one side, frontman Frank Daly replied:

Originally, we were gonna do 10 songs but we ran out of money. So we decided to do 6. We were gonna do a 12 inch like The Replacements Stink, but then you put it on and in 10 minutes you have to get up and turn it over. That bugged me. So we put it all on one side and let the other side be shiny. We saved money on mastering.

— Frank Daly, Flipside, May–June 1990

Like many Big Drill Car albums, Small Block is currently out of print.

== Track listing ==
1. "5 Year Itch" (Arnold, Daly) - 3:24
2. "Glory" (Daly) - 2:04
3. "Les Cochons Sans Poils" (Daly, Thomson) - 2:53
4. "Let Me Walk" (Arnold, Daly, Thomson) - 3:01
5. "Mag Wheel" (Arnold, Daly, Thomson, Marcroft) - 2:30
6. "Annie's Needle" (Daly, Marcroft) - 2:38

== Personnel ==
- Frank Daly - Vocals
- Mark Arnold - Guitar
- Bob Thomson - Bass
- Danny Marcroft - Drums

Additional personnel

- Stephen Egerton - Engineer, Producer
- Richard Andrews - Engineer, Producer
