= Patti Schmidt =

Canadian radio personality and DJ

- Born: 1968 (age 57–58); Carleton Place, Ontario
- Origin: Canada
- Occupations: Broadcaster, curator, creative producer, musician, DJ
- Instruments: Vocals, Bass

Patti Schmidt is a Canadian radio personality, curator, creative producer, musician and DJ from Montreal, Quebec. She is best known for her tenure as host and executive producer of CBC Radio 2's long-running alternative music program Brave New Waves from 1995 to 2007.

== Background ==
Born in 1968, Schmidt grew up in the suburbs outside of Ottawa. Arriving at McGill University as a teenager in 1987 to pursue a degree in film and communications, she first worked the airwaves at CKUT-FM, the school's radio station that launched the same year, while also writing for its music magazine covering local and national artists.

== CBC Radio ==
In 1990, she received a call-up from a producer at Brave New Waves to audition as a potential fill-in host. This turned into an informal internship that had her attending tapings, and by spring 1991 she debuted on-air as a contributor. She was hired as a writer and researcher later that summer. She also began to influence programming as the main record buyer, while also learning the ropes booking interviews, editing and producing.

In 1995, following personnel departures and budget cuts, she was announced as the new host of Brave New Waves after Brent Bambury left to become host of Midday. A few years later she also became the executive producer, stewarding the full editorial direction of the show. She also brought the show out of the studio and into venues, events and festivals across the country, including a national 15th-anniversary tour (1999-2000) in collaboration with Exclaim!, that she hosted in several cities. She forged relationships across the French-English broadcasting and cultural divides, producing live concerts in collaboration with Radio-Canada's new music program Le Navire Night, and Canadian artist showcases and web content with Bande à part.

She embraced the new media and online opportunities that arose during this time, producing webcasts and multimedia content with CBC Radio 3 and 120seconds.com.

In 2004 and 2005 she appeared as a regular contributor for NPR in Los Angeles, presenting notable, under the radar, new music from Canadian artists. In 2004 she was the keynote speaker at the National Campus Community Radio Conference in Edmonton, re-connecting to a circuit that began for her at CKUT.

In 2006, she began concurrently hosting the Montreal-based CBC Radio One arts and culture program Cinq à Six, covering arts and culture happenings across Quebec.

In 2007, she became the national and regional host for Canada Live, later also hosting the national music documentary program Inside the Music, until 2012.

== Later career ==
Following the end of Brave New Waves, Schmidt returned to McGill university to complete a master's degree in art history and communications.

She joined the MUTEK Montreal festival of electronic music and digital creativity, and programmed 10 editions from 2009 to 2019. As a curator, producer and editor she was again showcasing Canadian performers at the cutting-edge of electronic music; new forms of audiovisual creation; commissioning works, encouraging debuts, and exporting artists around the world through the festival's international editions.

Beginning in 2017 she spearheaded the festival's gender and diversity initiatives, creating an international cohort of artists and producing a two-day symposium on diversity in electronic music, resulting in the first ever instance of gender parity at MUTEK in 2018. Noting this achievement, the festival was awarded the Grand Prix du Conseil des arts de Montréal in 2020.

In 2016, as artistic director and lead faculty she developed Convergence: Electronic Music + Visual Arts Residency at the Banff Centre for Arts and Creativity. Mixing disciplines and collaborating across departments, she hired international faculty and adjudicated and created the curriculum for resident sound artists, electronic musicians, digital visual artists, installation and video artists, and evaluated and critiqued their projects, premiering a few at MUTEK the following year.

Joining the British Council in 2019, she worked as an advisor, programmer and mentor for the AMPLIFY Digital Arts Initiative, connecting women artists from across Canada, the Americas and the United Kingdom. She developed capacity building activities, and curriculum, fostered collaborations and helped coordinate international public-facing showcasing opportunities for the more than 100 women who passed through the initiative from 2018 to 2023.

She has hosted podcasts for MUTEK showcasing Canadian talent on Montreal-based web radio N10.as, and producing programs for Shouting Fire, the Burning Man web radio service. She has contributed narration to serial theatrical podcasts, multi-disciplinary art projects and several documentary films, including I Dream of Wires.

Since 2019 she has been working with Envision Management and Production as a digital consultant, project developer, and creative producer across a spectrum of artistic practices including music, audiovisual, dome and installation works; while also co-designing and delivering the ongoing Pathwaves Digital Literacy Incubator for musicians, dedicated to making careers more equitable and possible in the digital era.

Schmidt also serves as vice-president of the board of Montreal 24/24, a non-profit organization that analyzes, animates and provides frameworks for Montreal's nightlife as a new frontier for innovation.

== Music career ==
As part of the burgeoning indie rock scene in Montreal in the early 90s, Schmidt was a singer and bassist with Pest 5000 (1992-2001), a band that also featured Brave New Waves producer Kevin Komoda, Genevieve Heistek, Jon Acensio, and a long line of drummers including Howard Bilerman, Colin Burnett, Andy Vial, and Alexander McSween. They released recordings on Harriet Records, No Life Records and Derivative Records, the latter run by Schmidt and Patrick Hamou.

She founded a subsequent group with Komoda and Lewis Braden, called Nanobot Auxiliary Ballet (2001-2006). Alongside Jeff Waye, manager/owner of the North American component of Ninja Tune Records, the pair started the Ta-Da record label.

Since 2008 she has been an active DJ (often operating as Wheelie Houdini) and sound designer performing at festivals, clubs and galleries, locally, nationally and internationally.
