= Todor Kobakov =

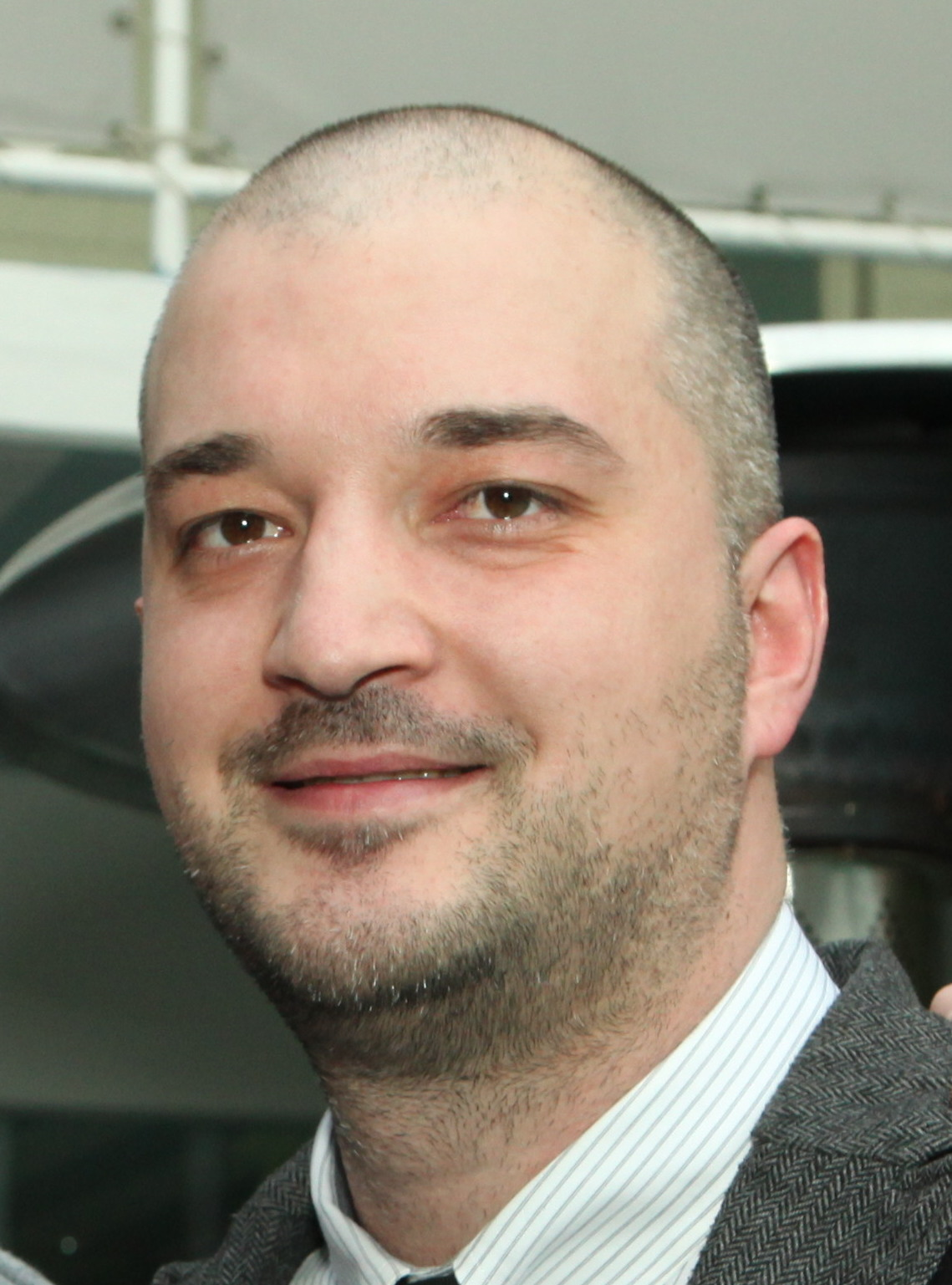
- Todor Kobakov

Background information
- Born: September 19, 1978 (age 47); Sofia, Bulgaria
- Education: University of Toronto
- Genres: Contemporary Classical, Alternative, Electronic
- Years active: 1998–present
- Label: 88 Calibre
- Website: www.todor.ca

Todor Kobakov (born September 19, 1978) is a Bulgarian-Canadian composer, producer, arranger and pianist based in Toronto, Ontario. He is best known for his film score for Brother, directed by Clement Virgo, his solo album, Pop Music, and his musical collaborations with artists including 070 Shake and Metric.

== Early life ==
Kobakov was born in Sofia, Bulgaria, where he was raised by his mother and grandmother. He comes from a family of classical musicians all of whom are bass players. Kobakov's grandmother played in the Bulgarian opera and his mother worked at Bulgarian National Television as a producer of music programming. Kobakov's musical training began at the piano as a toddler. At age seven, he was accepted into the Lubomir Pipkov Music School in Sofia where he studied for ten years. Kobakov moved to Canada at age sixteen and graduated from the University of Toronto Faculty of Music with a Performance Piano Degree at age twenty.

== Commercials ==
While in university Kobakov interned at Krystal Music & Sound Design, a commercial music house based in Toronto. The owner, David Krystal, schooled Kobakov on composing music for picture, including the use of production equipment for sound design and mixing. Kobakov landed his first commercial, a Nikon spot, in 2000. He went on to a successful run as a freelance composer landing over a dozen Canadian commercials. In 2007, Kobakov landed his first major international campaign for Vodafone Europe. Other international campaigns followed most notably for Macy's (U.S.), Foot Locker (UK), and Robinsons (UK). In 2010, Todor scored Canadian Cancer Society's short film Fight, which won the Silver Lion at the Cannes Lions International Advertising Festival.

== Artist collaborations ==
In 2003, Kobakov wrote the string arrangements for indie pop band Stars critically acclaimed sophomore album Set Yourself On Fire. Kobakov gained considerable attention when Pitchfork Media gave the album an 8.4 rating stating that "it might be the best orchestral pop album of the past year". Kobakov went on to score string arrangements for other prominent Canadian indie artists including Metric, Emily Haines, k-os, Sarah Slean, Lindy, Small Sins, and Dan Mangan. Kobakov has toured as a keyboardist with Emily Haines and The Soft Skeleton, Luke Doucet and Small Sins. In 2007, Kobakov and Lindy Vopnfjörð formed the indie rock band Major Maker. Their song "Rollercoaster" was licensed to a television commercial, which propelled the song to a Top 40 radio hit in Canada and a Canadian distribution deal with EMI Music Canada. That same year Kobakov was named "Toronto's Best Keyboardist" by Now Magazine.

In July 2010, Metric enlisted Kobakov to compose a string version of their breakthrough album Fantasies to be performed at Vivid Live, a music festival held in Sydney, Australia curated by Lou Reed and Lori Anderson. Kobakov accompanied Haines to the festival where she performed the songs accompanied by a string quartet. Kobakov also played piano as Haines and Lou Reed performed Reed's song "Perfect Day". Metric also commissioned Kobakov to compose a string version of "Eclipse (All Yours)", the theme song from the movie The Twilight Saga: Eclipse which Metric co-wrote with Howard Shore. Kobakov's arrangements can also be heard on Metric's iTunes Live Session album released on January 4, 2011. Canadian hip-hop artist k-os commissioned Kobakov to compose string arrangements for his MTV Unplugged performance on March 31, 2011.

== Film scores ==
Kobakov has composed eight film scores to date. His third film score of 2011 was for Fury, a neo-noir thriller starring Samuel L. Jackson, directed by David Weaver and released in 2012. Kobakov's film scores often combine piano, modern orchestration and electronic sounds. Kobakov's first film score was for the 2007 hipster comedy Young People Fucking which received significant media attention at the 2007 Toronto International Film Festival and further publicity when it was singled out by Stephen Harper while the Canadian Prime Minister was campaigning for his controversial Bill C-10 proposal. Kobakov has since gravitated to darker, grittier films such as Fury, Cold Blooded, Monster Brawl, Pinkville, Sympathy, and Hit List, 2011.

In addition to his commercial and film work, Kobakov has scored television documentaries including Mega Heist which aired on The Discovery Channel and High Impact which aired on History Channel. In 2021, he scored the documentary film Artificial Immortality, for which he won the Canadian Screen Music Award for best original score for a documentary feature film.

He won the Canadian Screen Award for Best Original Score at the 11th Canadian Screen Awards in 2023 for Brother.

== Solo releases ==
Kobakov's solo piano debut, Pop Music, was released in 2009 by 88 Calibre/Cuto. The Canadian release was distributed by EMI Music Canada while outside of Canada the album was released digitally via iTunes. The album features eleven songs, nine of which are instrumental and two which feature guest vocals by Emily Haines of Metric and Tunde Adebimpe of TV on the Radio. The songs on Pop Music were inspired by Kobakov's life experiences in both Bulgaria and Canada. The album received strong critical acclaim across Canada. Montreal's Hour Community proclaimed that "parts of Pop Music are so simultaneously vital and gentle we may need to invent a new word" while The Globe and Mail called Kobakov "a piano stylist in the gorgeous whimsical form of Erik Satie." The official music video for "Toronto Stories" was directed by Jaron Albertin.

Kobakov has also released two electronic albums under the moniker Cy Scobie. The releases are characterized by a mix of electronic beats and dark undertones. Kobakov has also produced dance remixes for Emily Haines (Mostly Waving Todor K remix) and Major Maker (Rollercoaster Sofia Scandalli remix).

== Filmography ==
Year	Title	Director	Genre
2013	Solo	Isaac Cravit	Mystery thriller
2012	The Samaritan	David Weaver	Neo-noir thriller
2011	Cold Blooded	Jason Lapeyre	Crime thriller
2011	Monster Brawl	Jesse Thomas Cook	Action horror comedy
2010	Hit List	Minh Collins	Dark comedy
2008	Pinkville	Steven Garbas	Psychological drama
2007	Sympathy	Andrew Moorman	Suspense, grindhouse
2007	Young People Fucking	Martin Gero	Romantic comedy
2015	Hellions	Bruce McDonald	Horror thriller
2015	Closet Monster	Stephen Dunn	Horror drama
2021	Artificial Immortality	Ann Shin	Documentary
2022	Brother	Clement Virgo	
2024	Humane	Caitlin Cronenberg	Dystopian thriller
2024	The Invisibles	Andrew Currie	Science fiction
2024	40 Acres	R. T. Thorne	Post-apocalyptic thriller
2026	#WhileBlack	Sidney Fussell, Jennifer Holness	Documentary

== Commercials (2008–present) ==
Year	Client	Title	Agency
2010	Amex	Yes	Ogilvy Canada
2010	Footlocker	Again	Sapient Nitro UK
2010	Canadian Cancer Society	Fight	DDB Canada
2010	Canadian Cancer Society	Combat	DDB Canada
2010	Toronto Rehab	Rehabilitation Saves Lives	Manifest Communications
2010	Winners	Spring Time	Ogilvy Canada
2009	Robinsons	Imagine	BBH London
2009	AIDS/HIV Awareness	Shine	Manifest Communications
2009	Chocolate Milk	Recharge	Grip Toronto
2009	Acura	Master The Road	Grip Toronto
2009	Acura	Driving Conditions	Grip Toronto
2008	Vodafone	Cartwheel	BBH London
2008	Macy's	Anthem	JWT NY

== String arrangements ==
Year	Band/Artist	Song	Release Details
2013	Sara Bareilles	I Wanna Be Like Me	The Blessed Unrest
2011	k-os	Astronaut	MTV Unplugged
2011	k-os	Born to Run	MTV Unplugged
2011	k-os	Burning Bridges	MTV Unplugged
2011	k-os	Man I Used To Be	MTV Unplugged
2011	k-os	Uptown Girl	MTV Unplugged
2011	k-os	Zambony	MTV Unplugged
2010	Metric	Eclipse (All Yours)	Vivid Live (performance)
2010	Metric	Help I'm Alive	iTunes Session
2010	Metric	Gimme Sympathy	iTunes Session
2010	Metric	Blindness	Vivid Live (performance)
2010	Metric	Gold, Guns, Girls	Vivid Live (performance)
2010	Metric	Satellite Mind	Vivid Live (performance)
2009	Dan Mangan	Nice, Nice, Very Nice	Set The Sails LP
2007	Emily Haines	Doctor Blind	Knives Don't Have Your Back LP
2007	Emily Haines	Reading In Bed	Knives Don't Have Your Back LP
2007	Emily Haines	Mostly Waving	Knives Don't Have Your Back LP
2006	Small Sins	Stay	Smallsinsmusic.com
2006	Lindy	Beautifully Undone	Lindymusic.com
2004	Sarah Slean	Weight	Orphan Music LP
2003	Stars	One More Night	Set Yourself On Fire LP
2003	Stars	Set Yourself On Fire	Set Yourself On Fire LP
2003	Stars	Your Ex-Lover Is Dead	Set Yourself On Fire LP
