= Brent Bambury =

Canadian radio and television personality

- Born: 1960 (age 65–66); Saint John, New Brunswick
- Occupations: radio and television broadcaster
- Known for: Brave New Waves, Midday, Go, Day 6

Brent Bambury (born 1960) is a Canadian radio and television personality. He has hosted a number of radio and television programs for the Canadian Broadcasting Corporation since the 1980s, including Brave New Waves, Midday and Day 6.

A native of Saint John, New Brunswick, Bambury began his career with the CBC in 1979 as a reporter for CBD-FM in Saint John, later moving to the station in Halifax as a reporter while studying English at Dalhousie University. He then moved to Montreal, becoming a correspondent for CBC Stereo's Brave New Waves while pursuing a master's degree at McGill University, but dropped his studies when he was offered the job of permanent host in 1985. The show, which aired nightly at 11:00 pm, was one of Canada's leading outlets for alternative rock and other countercultural programming in the late 1980s and early 1990s.

In the early 1990s, Bambury was also an entertainment reporter for CBC television's Midday. In 1995, Bambury became the show's cohost, replacing Kevin Newman, and his hosting duties at Brave New Waves went to Patti Schmidt.

In 2000, Midday ended its run. Bambury spent some time as a movie reviewer for Life Network's movie series Flick, as well as acting as a fill-in host for CBC Newsworld and CBC Radio One before hosting a successful short-run game show, Off the Cuff, on CBC Radio One in 2001. In 2002, he moved to Ottawa to take over as host of that station's afternoon current affairs program, All in a Day. That same summer, he also hosted Go, a nationally broadcast summer series which aired on Saturday mornings; following a second summer run in 2003, the show was added to the network's regular year-round schedule that fall.

In 2005, Bambury gave up hosting duties of All in a Day, and moved to Toronto along with the production of Go.

In 2007, Bambury guest hosted an episode of CBC Radio 3's weekly chart show The R3-30. He has also cohosted three episodes of the Canadian version of Test the Nation with Wendy Mesley on CBC Television.

Go broadcast its final episode in June 2010. That fall, Bambury launched the new national current affairs program Day 6. He has also guest hosted a number of episodes of Q.

Bambury is openly gay.

On the September 26, 2026, episode of Day 6, Bambury announced his retirement from the CBC, effective October 24.
