= Day 6 =

Canadian radio program

Day 6 is a Canadian radio program hosted by Brent Bambury, which airs Saturdays on CBC Radio One. The show presents a mix of the week's stories, including both news and cultural or entertainment topics, predominantly through interviews.

At the end of each episode, the program presents a "Riffed from the Headlines" segment, in which clips from three songs are spliced together as a clue to a news story from the previous week to which listeners are invited to send in guesses. This feature was retained from a similar segment in Bambury's prior series Go.

The program debuted on September 11, 2010, in the time slot formerly held by Go.

On the September 26, 2026, episode of the program, Bambury announced his retirement after more than four decades with the CBC, with his final episode slated to air on October 24. The show has since been hosted by Stephanie Skenderis, with long-term plans for the show to be announced.
