= The Nils =

- Origin: Montreal, Quebec, Canada
- Genre: Punk rock
- Years active: 1978–Present
- Labels: Psyche Industry Records, Siefried Records, Rock Hotel / Profile, Mag Wheel Records
- Members: Carlos Soria: vocals and bass. Mark Donato: guitar and vocals. Phil 'Gravedigger' Psarakos: guitar. Emilien Catalano: drums.
- Past members: Alex Soria vocals and guitar.
- Website: https://thenilsmtl.bandcamp.com

The Nils are a Montreal punk rock band formed in 1978 by Alex Soria. The Nils first gained local notoriety upon the 1982 release of a five-song demo entitled Now. Their self-titled debut album was released to critical acclaim in 1987, and earned praise from Rolling Stone and contemporary punk rock bands, including Hüsker Dü. The Nils disbanded and reformed on various occasions in the 1990s and early 2000s, until the death of Alex Soria in 2004. In 2010 Carlos Soria reformed the band, and in 2015 The Nils released Shadows and Ghosts, their first album of new material in over 25 years.

== Early days ==
The Nils were formed in 1978 by Alex Soria, only 12 years old at the time, and his older brother Carlos Soria. Carlos had become curious about the Montreal punk rock scene, and after bringing home albums by the Sex Pistols, The Clash, and The Damned, the brothers decided to form their own punk band.

The Nils' first release was a five-song demo cassette in 1982, entitled Now. In 1983, The Nils opened for both the Ramones and X for their Montreal dates at the Spectrum. Later that year, word about the Nils had spread to Los Angeles, and BYO Records invited the group to contribute the track "Scratches and Needles" to the compilation album Something to Believe In. In 1984, The Nils contributed "Call of the Wild" to Primitive Air Raid, a compilation album of the early-1980s Montreal punk scene. Psyche Industry Records, the independent label that released Primitive Air Raid, released The Nils' EP Sell Out Young! in 1985, and a second EP, Paisley, was issued by Siegfried Records in 1986. The critical praise for the two EPs caught the attention of the hip-hop label Profile Records, who approached the band to sign with their subsidiary, Rock Hotel Records.

== Success ==
In 1987, the Nils signed a lengthy record deal with Rock Hotel Records, who had recently signed other punk acts like D.O.A. and Cro-Mags. "In the contract with Rock Hotel, we were signed for seven albums and two options," said Carlos Soria. "At the time it sounded like a great deal. It was almost a major, which a lot of bands were starting to sign with." The Nils, the group's first full-length album, was recorded at Chung King Studios in Manhattan, and was produced by Chris Spedding, who had previously recorded the Sex Pistols.

The Nils was distributed in the United States by Profile Records, one of the leading hip-hop labels of the day. The album was acclaimed by critics, and rose to number eight on Rolling Stone's College Music chart, while artists such as Bob Mould, the Meat Puppets, and Superchunk were singing The Nils' praises.

Despite the positive reviews and chart success, Rock Hotel Records did not support the album release with a significant budget for music videos or touring. "Instead of helping us, everything was a problem: from getting support to tour to getting money for a video," said Carlos Soria. "And yet we were dominating the U.S. college charts and the reviews were amazing. But this record company ruined our career." John Kastner of the Doughboys and Asexuals has lamented that if the Nils had been from the United States, they "probably would have been as big and influential as The Replacements were."

== Break up ==
The Nils were halfway through a North American tour and writing material for their second album when Rock Hotel ran into serious financial problems and folded in 1988. While in Minneapolis, the band abruptly received notice that the rest of the tour was cancelled due to the bankruptcy of Profile Records. Although the label was bankrupt, The Nils could not release new material under their own name for another four years or sign with a different label. Without financial resources to tour and record The Nils splintered, with Carlos Soria leaving Montreal for California and Alex Soria launching a new band, Los Patos and Chino. With The Nils on a forced hiatus, Alex began working menial jobs and playing occasional solo shows around Montreal.

== Reunion ==
In 1992, free from their contract with Profile Records, Alex and Carlos re-formed The Nils, but after recording a handful of demos and some live work, the band stalled again in 1994. During this time, Alex accepted an offer to release a Nils a retrospective compilation by Woody Whelan of Mag Wheel records. The release was entitled Green Fields in Daylight.

Alex Soria launched a new band, Chino, featuring Mark Donato (currently of The Nils). They released Mala Leche, a collection of previously unrecorded Nils tracks and some new material before breaking up in 2002. After the demise of Chino, Alex, Carlos, and Mark revived The Nils again in 2003 and began writing new material. On December 13, 2004, the band halted when Alex tragically took his own life on a train track near his home.

In 2010, The Nils reformed with Carlos taking over from his brother on lead vocals. "It was hard because Alex wasn't around, but at the same time it was my way to keep Alex around," said Carlos Soria. "It was also hard because I didn't know how to be a lead singer." In 2015, The Nils released Shadows and Ghosts, their first album of new material in 25 years. The album was critically acclaimed, receiving significant radio play and was followed up by high-profile performances, including at the Amnesia Rockfest. To commemorate the 30th anniversary of The Nils, the album was reissued in 2017 by Label Obscura.

On November 18, 2022, The Nils released their fourth EP, Five Roses. The EP artwork was inspired by Montreal's iconic Five Roses Flour illuminated sign. Five Roses featured four new songs written by Carlos Soria and Alex Soria, as well as a cover of "Pink Turns to Blue" by Hüsker Dü. The EP’s first single, the hockey-themed "Fourth Line", was hailed as "gritty and melodic" and reminiscent of The Nils' heralded debut album.

== Lineup ==
Present

- Carlos Soria, Bass and Vocals
- Mark Donato, Guitars and Vocals
- Phil "Gravedigger" Psarakos, Guitars
- Emilien Catalano, Drums

Past

- Alex Soria, Vocals and guitar
- Chico Fit, Bass
- Guy Caron, Bass
- Terry Lee Toner, Drums
- Eloi Bertholet, Drums
- Jean Lortie, Drums
- Yvan Doroshuk, Keyboards
- Colin Burnett, Drums
- Lonnie James, Drums

== Discography ==
LPs

- The Nils, Profile Records, 1987.
- It must be something, Real Big North Records, 2009.
- The title is the secret song, Real Big North Records, 2009.
- Shadows and Ghosts, 2015.
- Brand New Waves Session, Artoffact Records, 2017.

EPs

- Now!, 1982.
- Sell out young, Psyche Industry Records, 1985.
- Paysley, Siegfried Records, 1986.
- Five Roses, 2022.

Compilations

- Green Fields in Daylight, Mag Wheel Records, 1996.
