= Ian LeFeuvre =

- Origin: Ottawa, Ontario, Canada
- Genres: Alternative rock
- Occupations: Musician, record producer, singer, songwriter
- Years active: 1990s–present

Ian LeFeuvre is a Canadian musician, record producer, singer, and songwriter.

== Early career ==
He was initially a member of the Ottawa alternative rock band Fun for Malakaï in the early 1990s, until the band broke up when drummer Peter von Althen moved to Toronto to join Skydiggers. LeFeuvre then spent several years as a guitarist for singer-songwriter Lynn Miles before reuniting with von Althen in the late 1990s to form the new band Starling. By the time that band released its debut album Sustainer in 2000 on Time Bomb Recordings, its lineup also included Danny Michel.

Although widely hyped as a "next big thing", the album's sales fell short of expectations and the label soon dropped them. Michel then left the band to pursue a solo career, and LeFeuvre concentrated on session and production work with Miles, Andy Stochansky and Jim Bryson until the band released its second and final album, Stuff You Should Have Said Before, independently in 2002.

The band briefly reunited in 2007, changing its name to The Hundreds and Thousands.

== Composing work ==
Following Starling's breakup, LeFeuvre did extensive soundtrack and composing work, including for the television series What's Up Warthogs!, Johnny Test, The Stanley Dynamic, The Adventures of Napkin Man, 24 Hour Rental, Combat Hospital, and Hi Opie!, the films The Husband, and James vs. His Future Self, the CBC Radio documentary series The Age of Persuasion and Under the Influence, and interstitial music for Teletoon and Kids' CBC.

He received a Canadian Screen Award nomination for Best Original Song at the 3rd Canadian Screen Awards for "The Whisper in Me", a song he wrote for the film Dirty Singles; at the 8th Canadian Screen Awards in 2020, he received nominations for both Best Original Song and Best Original Score (shared with Stephen Krecklo) for his work on James vs. His Future Self.

== Other ==
The song "22 Steps", which he cowrote with Stochansky for the album Five Star Motel, was covered by Australian pop singer Damien Leith on his album Where We Land, and was a Top 40 hit in Australia in 2006. The song "Ride with the Tide", which LeFeuvre cowrote with Emilie Mover, has been featured in the television series Girls and Pretty Little Liars.

He has also appeared as a session musician on recordings by k-os, Danny Michel, Kathleen Edwards, Jason Plumb, The Carnations, Major Maker, Scott Merritt, Lindy Vopnfjörð and Barenaked Ladies.
