= Kliph Nesteroff =

Author

- Born: Castlegar, British Columbia, Canada
- Occupation: Author

Kliph Nesteroff is a Canadian author, best known for his 2015 history of American comedy, The Comedians.

After eight years as a stand-up comedian, Nesteroff became a frequent contributor to WFMU and a national, on-air contributor for CBC Radio One. For several years he moderated Classic Television Showbiz, a website devoted to classic show business and comedians. He has made multiple appearances on Gilbert Gottfried's Amazing Colossal Podcast and WTF with Marc Maron. Maron was the executive producer of Nesteroff's limited-series Earwolf podcast Classic Showbiz.

== Early life ==
Nesteroff is of Doukhobor heritage and from South Slocan, British Columbia. He was expelled from high school for giving a speech exposing "salacious dirty laundry" about the teachers, and within a year had moved to Toronto to take a sitcom writing class.

== The Comedians ==
Grove Press released Nesteroff's first book, The Comedians: Drunks, Thieves, Scoundrels and the History of American Comedy on November 3, 2015, to positive reviews. It was selected as a book of the year by several papers including LA Weekly, The Los Angeles Times and the National Post.

Merrill Markoe wrote in the Wall Street Journal, "I thought I knew a lot about the history of American comedy. But this book located gaps in my knowledge I never knew were there and filled them with jaw-dropping anecdotes that made my eyes spin in different directions. For comedy completists and comedians alike, this book is a real treat." The Washington Post said of Nesteroff, "He writes with insider perception but never seems to be either whitewashing or trashing any of this outrageous cast. Like a biblical epic, The Comedians seems to have a cast of thousands. One act barely somersaults offstage before Nesteroff leads on the next. The anecdotes are memorable and often hilarious ... With his encyclopedic knowledge, talent for vivid anecdotes, and tireless gusto, he drives this busload of rowdy clowns into the 21st century." The Onion's AV Club stated, "Nesteroff is intent on giving the beautiful losers of comedy their due. The Comedians [is] an astonishingly assured and compulsively readable exploration of an impossibly vast topic." The New York Times' book review said, "The way he traces ... the evolution of comedy is fascinating ... Through his elegiac attention, these forgotten comedians become almost romantic figures, the stars of a secret history of laughter."

== We Had a Little Real Estate Problem ==
Nesteroff's second book, We Had A Little Real Estate Problem: The Unheralded Story of Native Americans and Comedy, was released on February 16, 2021 by Simon & Schuster. Nesteroff said that he approached the book by emphasizing the comedians telling their own stories.

Publishers Weekly called it a "disturbing yet beautiful history." According to the New York Times, "His new book, which darts back and forth in time, is a sprawling look at Indigenous comedians, an overlooked branch of comedy ... His book provides context for an argument about the importance of representation, detailing an exhaustive history of the racism suffered by Indigenous people in popular culture..." Steve Martin referred to the project as "important" and praised it as a "remarkable book that takes the history of Native American comedy and turns it into a page-turner." Notable endorsements have come from Judd Apatow, Bob Odenkirk, and Marc Maron. Major Indigenous authors including Stephen Graham Jones, David Treuer, and Philip J. Deloria have also lauded the project. A chapter was excerpted in Esquire.

Colby Cosh wrote in his National Post synopsis, "I decided that I wasn’t sure whether the material was promising, but also that Nesteroff couldn't write a bad book if you kicked him in the head and cut off his thumbs. I'm pleased to report very smugly that the last half of this estimate has proved true. No fans of Nesteroff's uncanny interviewing of old-time comics or readers of his 2015 book "The Comedians" will have doubted it. So the high quality of the book imposes a duty on me to persuade other readers, people who may not be comedy nerds or Nesteroff fans, that it's worthwhile ... The whole thing is a fascinating picture of how an artistic tradition evolves. You could learn a lot from it if you have no earthly interest in, or even sympathy for, First Nations ... It's a fascinating universe, and you couldn’t have a better guide than Nesteroff."

== Outrageous ==
In Outrageous, he tells the history of culture wars in entertainment.

== Television ==
Nesteroff was the consulting producer on both seasons of the CNN series The History of Comedy, which had its premiere at the Sundance Film Festival. His work with CNN continued with the Tom Hanks mini-series The Movies and the primetime series The Story of Late Night. He has appeared on the CNN Newsroom eulogizing comedians including Gilbert Gottfried, Dick Gregory, and Jerry Lewis.

Nesteroff hosted the Viceland mini-series Funny How from executive producer Spike Jonze in 2016. Funny How featured appearances from James Adomian, Dave Atell, David Cross, Dana Gould, Artie Lange, Doug Stanhope, and Michael Winslow and presented the first television appearances of Mary Beth Barone and Irene Tu.

Other television appearances include the Judd Apatow documentary George Carlin's American Dream on HBO, W. Kamau Bell's We Need to Talk About Cosby on Showtime, Kevin Hart's Right to Offend on A&E, and The Dark Side of Comedy on Vice TV. He was the research consultant for Rob Reiner's documentary about Albert Brooks on HBO Max.

== Live shows and podcasts ==
Nesteroff has appeared at the Just For Laughs Comedy Festival in Montreal, the New York Comedy Festival, the Los Angeles Cinefamily, Chautauqua Institution, SF Sketchfest, Caroline's on Broadway, Drawn & Quarterly, Mark Twain House, the Turner Classic Movies Film Festival, Upright Citizens Brigade Theater, and Harvard. The Hollywood Reporter announced in May 2016 that Nesteroff was curating the National Comedy Center, which houses George Carlin's personal archive.

Nesteroff previously toured with a one-man show about the history of comedy. One critic described his Toronto engagement as "heroin for comedy nerds ... Nesteroff shared dozens of unforgettable stand-up-related tales from the early 19th century to now. The depth of his knowledge about the history of American comedy combined with his off-the-cuff and funny yet eloquent stage presence made this entire show utterly engrossing."

Nesteroff's podcast work includes five appearances on WTF with Marc Maron and five appearances on Gilbert Gottfried's Amazing Colossal Podcast. He is a frequent presence on the CBC Radio programs Day 6, Q, and The Current, and NPR programs Air Talk with Larry Mantle, The Leonard Lopate Show, Press Play, and Morning Edition.

== Reception ==
Vice Magazine called Nesteroff "The Human Encyclopedia of Comedy," and Los Angeles Magazine profiled him as "The King of Comedy Lore." The New York Times has deemed some of his theories "provocative" while Vanity Fair calls his work "essential." Nesteroff was included on LA Weekly's Best of Los Angeles list in 2016, and was dubbed the "premier popular historian of comedy" by the New York Times in 2021. The A.V. Club referred to Nesteroff as their "favorite pop culture historian."
