= Mood Swings (Small Sins album) =

Studio album by Small Sins
- Released: Sep 25, 2007
- Genre: Rock
- Label: Boompa (Canada)/Astralwerks (U.S.)

Small Sins chronology
Small Sins (2006)	Mood Swings (2007)

Mood Swings is an album by Canadian indie rock act Small Sins, released in North America by Astralwerks and Boompa in 2007 and by French record label Reset Junior in 2008.

The album was produced in part by John McEntire.

== Track listing ==
1. "I Need a Friend" – 3:38
2. "Morning Face" – 3:31
3. "What Your Baby's Been Doing" – 3:41
4. "On the Line" – 4:10
5. "Prove Me Wrong" – 4:00
6. "Drunk E-Mails" – 3:32
7. "On the Run" – 3:49
8. "It Keeps Me on My Toes" – 3:42
9. "Airport" – 3:19
10. "On a Mission" – 3:29
11. "We Will Break Our Own Hearts" – 3:46
12. "Holiday" – 3:51
13. "Bullet" – 6:49
