= No Worse for the Wear =

Studio album by Big Drill Car
- Released: May 20, 1994
- Recorded: September 1993
- Genre: Pop punk
- Length: 31:51
- Label: Cargo/Headhunter Records
- Producer: Stephen Egerton; Bill Stevenson

Big Drill Car chronology
Toured (A Live Album) (1993)	No Worse for the Wear (1994)	A Never Ending Endeavor (2009)

Professional ratings
Review scores
Source	Rating
AllMusic	(not rated)
Punk Planet	Favorable

No Worse for the Wear is the third studio album by Orange County pop punk band Big Drill Car. It is the only album without their classic original line-up, featuring new members Keith Fallis and Darrin Norris. The band reached a little success through the album, if only for a short time before their 13-year break-up, from 1995 to 2008. The release of No Worse for the Wear would also gain Big Drill Car supporting slots on national and world tours with bands such as The Offspring (who had just released Smash to unexpected success and acclaim) and Guttermouth.

The songs "The Shake", "Nogaina", and "What You Believe" were featured, amongst other Cargo/Headhunter Records artists, in the 1997 Sega Saturn/Sony PlayStation game Courier Crisis.

Like many Big Drill Car albums, No Worse for the Wear is currently out of print.

== Track listing ==
Track listing
Track number	Song name	Duration
1	The Shake	2:27
2	Friend of Mine	3:14
3	Duck and Cover	1:22
4	Nagain	3:10
5	In Disguise	2:58
6	Crystal's Ball	2:35
7	Wondering	3:27
8	What You Believe	2:26
9	Thin White Line	2:41
10	Step Right Up	2:47
11	Yer Holdin	2:13
12	Hye	2:31

== Personnel ==
- Frank Daly - Vocals
- Mark Arnold - Guitar
- Darrin Norris - Bass
- Keith Fallis - Drums

=== Additional personnel ===
- Bill Stevenson - Producer
- Stephen Egerton - Producer
- Jeff Powell - Engineer
- Jeffrey Reed - Engineer
- John Hampton - Mixing
