= Small Sins =

- Origin: Toronto, Ontario, Canada
- Genres: Electronic, alternative, indie
- Years active: 2000–present
- Labels: Boompa (Canada); Astralwerks (US)
- Members: Thomas D'Arcy
- Website: smallsinsmusic.com

Small Sins, formerly The Ladies and Gentlemen, is the Toronto-based indie rock act of Thomas D'Arcy. The project's studio recordings are mainly created by D'Arcy with the aid of synthesizers, and then performed on stage by the full band.

== History ==
D'Arcy, former member of The Carnations, founded The Ladies and Gentlemen as a solo recording project and independently recorded a solo album of electro-rock music, titled Small Sins. D'Arcy then put together a band for live appearances consisting of Kevin Hilliard, Todor Kobakov, Steve Krecklo (also of The Carnations), and Brent Follett. For legal reasons, D'Arcy had to change the project name; he chose Small Sins, and the album was promoted under that name.

D'Arcy recorded a second album, Mood Swings, in 2007, with producer John McIntyre. D'Arcy performed all of the music on the album himself.

In 2010, Small Sins released the album Pot Calls Kettle Black; this was the first album in which the touring band members contributed to the recording. The band did some touring the following year, and released a single, "Why Don't You Believe Me?", which peaked at 28 on the Alternative Rock charts. The group then disbanded, and D'Arcy began recording and performing as a solo artist.

== Discography ==
=== Albums ===
- 2006: Small Sins
- 2007: Mood Swings
- 2007: The Mellow EP
- 2010: Pot Calls Kettle Black
- 2021: Volume II

=== Singles ===
^ 2011: "Why Don't You Believe Me?" (#28)
