= Thomas D'Arcy (singer) =

- Born: Guernsey, Channel Islands
- Origin: Toronto, Ontario, Canada
- Genres: Indie rock
- Occupations: Musician, producer, engineer
- Instruments: Vocals, bass
- Years active: 1995–present
- Labels: Astralwerks, Boompa, Thomas D'Arcy Music, MapleMusic Recordings, Arts and Crafts

Thomas D'Arcy is a Canadian singer and songwriter born in Guernsey, Channel Islands. D'Arcy's family immigrated to Toronto, Ontario, in 1981. He has been a member of indie rock bands The Carnations, All Systems Go!, Small Sins, Another Blue Door, The I-Spies, BROS., k-os, Tommy Hawkins, and Major Maker, among others. He is a graduate of philosophy from the University of Toronto.

== Artist career ==
In 1995, D'Arcy and three high school friends formed The Carnations, with D'Arcy as lead singer and principal songwriter. The band played in nightclubs its members were not old enough to get into (due to the legal drinking age in Ontario being 19). The Carnations wrote and performed the theme song for the MuchMusic show So 90's, and were CFNY 102.1 new rock search finalists.

The Carnations called it quits in 2004 with an announcement on their website. In 2005, D'Arcy conceived Small Sins (formerly known as The Ladies and Gentlemen) as a self-contained solo unit. D'Arcy continued to record under the Small Sins moniker until 2011, when he opted to release solo records under his own name. D'Arcy was the touring bass player for rapper k-os from 2009 to 2014.

Throughout the years, D'Arcy has been commissioned to create music for Canadian advertising campaigns, including for Telus, The Home Depot, Triscuits, Dodge, Bell Canada, Scotiabank, Coca-Cola, Honda, Quaker, Alesse, Walmart, Tetley, Hyundai, Toyota, Sunchips, McDonald's, and EOS. D'Arcy has also placed music in over 100 television shows and films. In 2016, D'Arcy provided the musical score for the CBC web series My 90 Year Old Roommate. D'Arcy also wrote and performed the theme song for the CBC children's show Ollie! The Boy Who Became What He Ate.

In 2012, D'Arcy recorded a cover record of the entire Bad Habits album by UK band The Monks. Members of Sloan, The Pursuit of Happiness, Limblifter, The New Pornographers, Change of Heart, The Doughboys, and Cursed contributed guest performances to the album, as did John Ford, an original member of The Monks.

In 2014, D'Arcy opened the studio Taurus Recording along with fellow producer and engineer Jon Drew.

In 2016, D'Arcy self-recorded, wrote and produced a six song collaboration with Hawksley Workman under the name Tommy Hawkins called Amy. In 2016, D'Arcy signed a publishing deal with Arts and Crafts Records. In 2019, D'Arcy was nominated for a Juno for Jack Richardson Producer of the Year.

In 2021, D'Arcy revived his pet project, Small Sins with a new eight song album called Volume II. An alternate orchestral version of the album was also released in April 2021.

== Producer/engineer credits ==
| Year | Artist | Project | Role | Notes |
|---|---|---|---|---|
| 2026 | July Talk | X | Producer/Engineer/Mixer | Double Album - 10 Year Anniversary |
| 2026 | Larkk | Cinders | Producer/Engineer/Mixer | Dear Rouge Solo Project |
| 2026 | Noela St Nicolous | All I Wanted Was a Friend | Producer/Engineer/Mixer | Debut Single |
| 2026 | The Sheepdogs | Keep Out of the Storm | Engineer/Mixer | Full Length |
| 2026 | Lia Pappas-Kemps | Winged | Engineer | Full Length |
| 2026 | Tauro | Act I | Engineer/Producer/Writer | Brendan Canning + Cynthia Tauro |
| 2025 | Sloan | Based On the Best Seller | Engineer | Full Length |
| 2025 | TWRP | The Longest Weekend | Engineer/co-writer | Full Length |
| 2025 | The Strumbellas | Maybe It’s Me | Co-Writer | Single |
| 2025 | Heavyweights Brass Band | Knockout | Engineer | Full Length |
| 2025 | Ewan Currie | Strange Vacation | Engineer/mixer/additional production | Full Length |
| 2025 | Altameda | Crazy Blue | Producer/Engineer/Mixer | Full Length |
| 2024 | The Sheepdogs | Hell Together | Engineer | EP |
| 2024 | Mawzy | Long View | Producer/Engineer | Indie Pop |
| 2024 | NOBRO | Set Your Pussy Free | Writer/Additional Engineer | Juno for Rock Album of the Year + Polaris Nominee |
| 2024 | Thunder Queens | Cannonball | Producer/Engineer | Breeders Cover |
| 2024 | Lia Pappas-Kemps | Switchblade | Engineer | Single |
| 2024 | TWRP | Digital Nightmare | Engineer | Seventh Full Length |
| 2023 | Trey Magnifique | Mature Situations | Engineer/Singer | NSP Side Project |
| 2023 | His Death Was Red | Jesus Freaks | Engineer/Producer | EP |
| 2023 | Sluice | Archiviste | Engineer | French Language/Full Length |
| 2023 | Shamus Band | The Shepherd and the Wolf | Engineer | Sheepdogs side project |
| 2022 | NOBRO | Live Your Truth/Shred Some Gnar | Producer/Engineer/Writer | Dine Alone Records |
| 2022 | Whitehorse | Summer Wine | Engineer | Six Shooter Records |
| 2022 | Dear Rouge | Spirit | Producer/Engineer/Writer | 'Fake Fame' #1 Canadian Rock Radio |
| 2022 | The Sheepdogs | Outta Sight | Engineer/Mixer | Full Length |
| 2022 | Jesse Northey | Onion Knight | Producer/Engineer/Mixer | First Full Length |
| 2022 | Altameda | Born Losers | Producer/Engineer | Juno Nomination (Adult Alternative Album of the Year) |
| 2021 | TWRP | New and Improved | Engineer | Sixth Full Length |
| 2021 | k-os | Just What I Needed | Engineer/Producer/Mixer | The Cars (Cover) |
| 2021 | The Sheepdogs | No Simple Thing | Mixer | Peak at #2 Canadian Rock Radio |
| 2021 | BROS | Volume II | Producer/Engineer | Sheepdogs Side Project |
| 2021 | Whitehorse | Modern Love | Engineer | Six Shooter Records |
| 2021 | Samantha Martin and Delta Sugar | The Reckless One | Additional Engineer | Juno Nomination (Best Blues Album 2021) |
| 2020 | The Trews | 1921 | Engineer/Producer | The Who Cover from Tommy |
| 2020 | Rich Aucoin | United States | Engineer/Overdubs | 'How It Breaks' CBC #1 |
| 2020 | NOBRO | Sick Hustle | Engineer/Producer | Dine Alone Records |
| 2019 | Kate Boothman | My Next Mistake | Engineer/Producer/Writer | Second Full Length |
| 2018 | Neko Case | Hell-On | Engineer | 'Gumball Blue' NP overdubs |
| 2018 | Sleepless Nights | Keith Hamilton | Engineer/Mixer | Cassette |
| 2018 | The Sheepdogs | Changing Colours | Engineer/Producer/Mixer | 'Hole Where My Heart Should Be' #1 Canadian Rock Radio |
| 2018 | Shad | A Short Story About a War | Engineer 'All I Need Is Love' | feat. Yukon Blonde |
| 2018 | Yukon Blonde | Critical Hit | Engineer/Producer | 'Love The Way You Are' CBC #1 |
| 2017 | Ninja Sex Party | Under The Covers Vol. II | Engineer | Billboard USA No. 1 Independent |
| 2017 | White Hot Guilt | White Hot Guilt - EP | Engineer/Producer/Mixer | July Talk side project |
| 2017 | Thomas D'Arcy | Ollie! The Boy Who Became What He Ate | Theme Composer/Performer | CBC Kids Television |
| 2017 | Rich Aucoin | Release | Producer/Engineer | January 2018 |
| 2016 | Hannah Georgas | This Christmas | Producer/Engineer/Mixer | Amazon X-Mas Exclusive |
| 2016 | Tommy Hawkins | Amy | Producer/Engineer/Mixer/Writer | Collaboration w/ Hawksley Workman |
| 2016 | My 90-Year-Old Roommate | Series | Score Composer/Engineer | CBC Series |
| 2016 | Lanikai | EP | Writer/Producer/Engineer | Second Album in Production |
| 2016 | July Talk | Touch | Additional Production/Arrangements | SOCAN No. 1 Song Award (Push + Pull) JUNO Winner Alt Album 2017 |
| 2016 | Bros | Vol. 1 | Producer/Engineer/Mixer | Theme for CBC Q (Tell Me) |
| 2016 | Ninja Sex Party | Under the Covers | Engineer | Billboard USA No. 9 (sales) |
| 2016 | Soul Stew | Volume III | Engineer | Soul Covers |
| 2016 | TWRP | Guardians of the Zone | Engineer | feat. Ninja Sex Party |
| 2015 | AA Wallace | In Alpha Zones | Engineer | Second Album in Production |
| 2015 | The Sheepdogs | Future Nostalgia | Engineer (Back Down) | Juno Nomination (Best Rock Album 2016) |
| 2015 | TWRP | Believe in Your Dreams | Producer/Engineer | feat. White Hot Guilt |
| 2013 | Still Life Still | Mourning Trance | Producer | Arts & Crafts |
| 2013 | July Talk | July Talk | Additional Engineer | Juno Winner (Best Alt Album 2015) |

== Artist discography ==
=== The Carnations ===
- 1997: Superluminal
- 1998: The Carnations / The Persuasion Split single 7"
- 1999: A Return to Melody
- 2000: The Carnations / Nero Split single 7"
- 2001: The Carnations
- 2003: In Good Time

=== Small Sins ===
- 2006: Small Sins
- 2007: Mood Swings
- 2007: The Mellow EP
- 2010: Pot Calls Kettle Black

=== Thomas D'Arcy ===
- 2012: Tribute to the Monks: Bad Habits
- 2013: What We Want (Thomas D'Arcy Music / MapleMusic Recordings)
- 2013: The Price You Pay EP
- 2013: I Wake Up Every Day EP
- 2014: Songs For A Film That Does Not Exist
- 2015: Fooled You Twice
- 2016: Amy (as Tommy Hawkins)
- 2019: Return to Wherever (credited for his vocals on the track "All Night Forever")
- 2024: Digital Nightmare (credited for his vocals on the track "HTMLOVE")
