= Psyche Industry Records =

Canadian record label

- Founded: 1984
- Founder: Dan Webster; Randy Boyd
- Genre: Alternative, indie, punk rock, hardcore punk
- Country of origin: Canada
- Location: Montreal, Quebec

Psyche Industry Records was the leading alternative, punk and hardcore independent record label in Montreal, Quebec, Canada, in the beginning of the 1980s. The music label was established in 1984 on Cartier Street by show promoter Dan Webster and Randy Boyd and released mostly records by Montreal bands, but with many exceptions, some artists who appeared on compilations including Porcelain Forehead and Direct Action (on Primitive Air Raid), as well as most of the artists on It Came from the Pit, and solo releases by Groovy Religion and NoMeansNo.

== History ==
Webster and Boyd started Psyche Industry Records as the Musicians Promotional Assistance Society, putting out the legendary Primitive Air Raid compilation featuring mostly Montreal punk and alternative bands, but also bands from elsewhere in Canada, in 1984. This first release was mostly paid for by a benefit show entitled Freedom 84, which took place on June 16, 1984, at Salle Louis De France on Rue Duluth in Montreal. In 1985, the label released another compilation, which was more alternative, avantguarde and industrial leaning, entitled "Panic, Panic". Psyche Industry also re-released the Asexuals first LP, "Be What You Want", that had been released on First Strike Records in 1984 but was out of print. They released a total of eight LP's in 1985, including records by Montreal legends The Nils, Asexuals, S.C.U.M., Disappointed a Few People and NoMeansNo before folding in 1987.

Boyd went on to be a partner in Cargo Records.

== Discography ==
- MPAS 01 - Various - Primitive Air Raid - 1984
- PIR 02 - Various - Panic, Panic - 1985
- PIR 03 - Asexuals - Be what you want - 1985
- PIR 04 - Condition - Mumbo Jumbo - 1985
- PIR 05 - Various - It came from the Pit - 1985
- PIR 06 - The Nils - Sell Out Young! - 1985
- PIR 07 - Asexuals - Contemporary World - 1985
- PIR 08 - S.C.U.M. - Born Too Soon - 1985
- PIR 09 - Various - Ultimatum - 1986
- PIR 010 - Groovy Religion - Thin Gypsy Thief - 1986
- PIR 011 - Disappointed a Few People - Dead in Love - 1986
- PIR 012 - NoMeansNo - Sex Mad - 1986

== See also ==
- List of record labels
