= The Carnations =

Canadian indie rock band

- Origin: Toronto, Ontario
- Genres: Indie rock
- Years active: 1995-2004
- Labels: MapleNationWide, Universal, Alphabetty Records, Ductape Records, Sycamore
- Members: Thomas D'Arcy (1995—2004); Nathan Rekker (1996—2004); Stephen Krecklo (1995—2004); Patrick Conan (2001-2004)
- Past members: Ian LeFeuvre, Terrence Craig Toutant

The Carnations were a Canadian indie rock band started in 1995 by Thomas D'Arcy on lead vocals and bass, and Stephen Krecklo on vocals and guitar. It expanded in 1996 to include Nathan Rekker on guitar and vocals, and Patrick Conan on drums.

== History ==
The first album, Superluminal, was released in 1997 and received favourable reviews in Toronto's Eye Weekly and the Toronto Star. One song, "Bald Avenger," was selected for the CFNY New Rock Search CD in Toronto. D'Arcy was just sixteen years old, and Krecklo seventeen, not yet old enough to play in bars.

In 1998, the band released a split 7-inch single called I'm So Sorry on Sycamore Records in Barrie, Ontario. The single was named one of the top 10 of the year by NOW Magazine. In 1999 The band performed in Toronto at the Bovine Sex Club.

The Carnations' self-titled 2001 mini-CD was produced by Ian Blurton (producer of The Weakerthans). A small deal with UK label Alphabetty Records saw the release of the single, "Scream & Yell." Record Collector Magazine called it "Single Of The Month", and the entire limited run of 1,000 sold out in a year, almost entirely at live shows and through mail order.

At the time, new drummer Ian LeFeuvre kept his day job, D’Arcy joined All Systems Go! (Bad Taste Records), sharing singing and song-writing responsibilities with John Kastner (ex-Doughboys), and Krecklo became a member of Andy Stochansky’s band (RCA Records). The self-titled album was completed a few months later and ready for release on Toronto’s Ductape Records, whose roster at the time included The Meligrove Band, Four Square, Dead Letter Dept., and The Moops.

The band performed at the 2003 Halifax Pop Explosion. In early February 2004, the band announced via their website that they would be dissolving, thanking their fans and stating that "unfortunately, all good things must come to an end eventually, so, this is the end." The band performed one last show on February 28, 2004, at Toronto's Legendary Horseshoe Tavern, along with The Meligrove Band, The I-Spies and SS Cardiacs.

D'Arcy formed Small Sins as a side project in 2000, another indie rock act, which includes Stephen Krecklo in its live incarnation. He continues to perform under this moniker.

Nathan Rekker formed Sports: The Band in 2007 with Shayne Cox, Robin Hatch and Michael Small of The Meligrove Band.

== Style ==
Their sound has been likened to other Canadian bands of the indie rock persuasion such as Thrush Hermit and Sloan. D'Arcy has stated: "Although I don't consider Elvis Costello or The Pixies to be direct influences on our music, I can definitely see how one might draw that comparison. For what it's worth, my favourite band is the Beatles."

== Personnel ==
- Thomas D'Arcy (1995—2004)
- Nathan Rekker (1996—2004)
- Stephen Krecklo (1995—2004)
- Patrick Conan (2001–2004)
- Ian LeFeuvre
- Terrence Craig Toutant (1998–2001)

== Discography ==
=== Albums ===
- 1997: Superluminal
- 1999: A Return to Melody
- 2001: The Carnations
- 2003: In Good Time

=== 7" Singles ===
- 1998: The Carnations / The Persuasion Split single
- 2000: The Carnations / Nero Split single

== See also ==
- Canadian rock
- List of bands from Canada
- List of Canadian musicians
- Category:Canadian musical groups
