= Asexuals (band) =

Canadian hardcore punk band

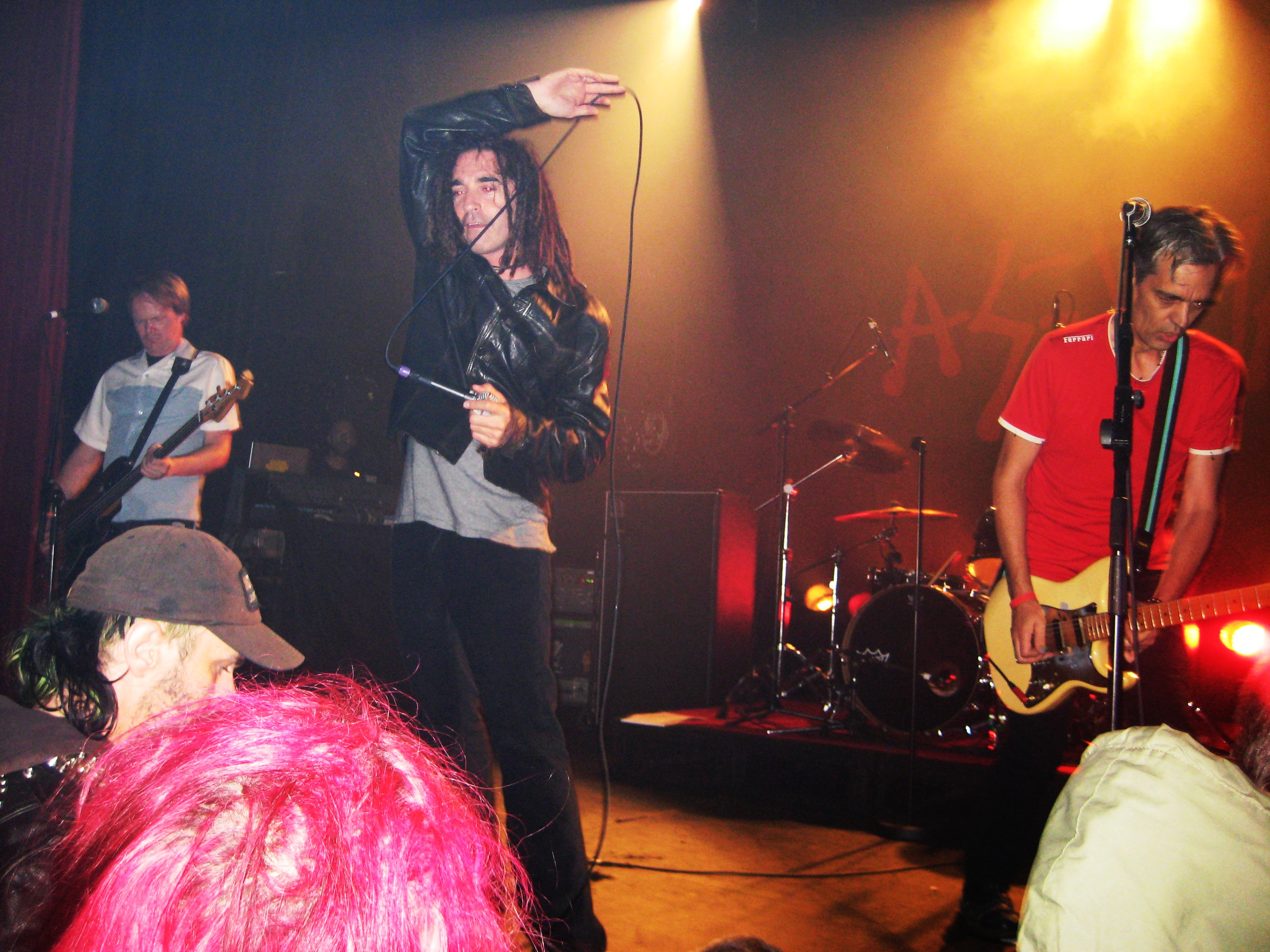
- The Asexuals (T.J., John and Sean with Paul on drums) in Montreal, October 2010

Background information
- Origin: Beaconsfield, Quebec, Canada
- Genres: Punk rock; hardcore punk; alternative rock; power pop
- Years active: 1983–1997, 2010–present
- Labels: Og Music; First Strike Records; Psyche Industry; Cargo; Boss Tuneage Records; RPN Records; Hypnotic Records; Artoffact Records
- Members: John Kastner; Sean Friesen; T.J. Collins; Paul Remington

The Asexuals (or Asexuals) is a Canadian hardcore punk band from Beaconsfield that was a mainstay of the Montreal punk scene in the 1980s before changing into an alternative band following the departure of singer John Kastner. Kastner left to form the Doughboys and later, All Systems Go!.

== History ==
The Asexuals formed in 1983 when Sean Friesen, T.J. Collins and Paul Remington, all Beaconsfield High students, decided to start a punk rock band. Another Beaconsfield native, future actor Al Goulem, was in the band as second guitarist for a few months with Collins singing. Their friend John Kastner quickly joined and became the singer.

After briefly using the names "Commonwealth", "Dead Dog", "Johnny Jew and the Holocaust" and "VD Teens", they finally chose the name "Asexuals" because none of the band members had girlfriends at the time. Their music mixed elements of hardcore as well as more melodic punk rock à la The Nils or Hüsker Dü.

=== 1984–1985: Be What You Want, Contemporary World ===
The band played gigs in Montreal, Ottawa, Kingston and Toronto, opening for touring Canadian and American punk bands before releasing their first EP, Featuring: The Asexuals on Og Music in 1984. They quickly released their second EP, B.F.D. and, the same year, contributed the song "Contra Rebels" to the Montreal punk compilation Primitive Air-Raid on Psyche Industry Records. In December 1984, they released their first LP Be What You Want on First Strike Records.

By the following year, Psyche Industry Records had received much positive feedback about the song, "Contra Rebels", (the opening track from the Primitive Air-Raid compilation), so they re-released the band's Be What You Want LP after First Strike Records refused to do so, having stopped answering the band's letters and phone calls. Also in 1985, Psyche Industry released the Asexuals' second LP, Contemporary World, which featured a hardcore treatment of Bob Dylan's classic song, "The Times They Are a-Changin'", and generally flirted with a more alternative rock sound. The band went on a two-month, 69-date tour across the U.S.A. and Canada to promote that album.

The Asexuals were reviled in many punk fanzines because of "Contra Rebels". The lyrics were a little ambiguous, particularly the lines "Contra-rebels, trained by the CIA, Contra-rebels, will blow your Reds away". Tim Yohannon of Maximumrocknroll didn't get the irony, calling the band "the mouthpieces of the new right" before apologizing a few months later.

In 1987, Kastner clashed with the other members about the band's evolving musical direction, and was kicked out. Kastner went on to form the Doughboys, while the Asexuals reconfigured themselves, with Collins and Freisen both playing electric guitar and sharing lead-vocal duties, and bringing in then-Jerry Jerry and the Sons of Rhythm Orchestra bassist Blake Cheetah (now better known as Bangkok-based writer Jim Algie) to take over bass guitar from Collins. They toured across North America continuously, opening for fellow Canadian punk bands like D.O.A. and SNFU, as well as such American hardcore greats as Hüsker Dü, the Minutemen, the Dicks and Youth Brigade.

=== 1988–1992: Dish, Exile from Floontown ===
In 1988, the band released their third full-length LP, Dish, on Cargo Records. Under the direction of Producer Steve Kravac, Dish was an artistic and sonic departure from their previous recordings, not only because of the noticeable absence of Kastner's sneering vocals, but because of a more college-radio friendly sound. For the first time, the band departed from the standard arrangement of distorted electric guitars, bass, and drums—the opening track featured acoustic guitars and horns. While this less brash sound alienated many long-time fans, the songs generally remained punchy and hard-rocking, and the band retained a tougher sound when performing live.

The band was on the verge of breaking up when a German promoter offered them a contract to tour Europe. Cheetah quit the band after this tour and was replaced by Dom Pompeo, with whom they recorded their fourth LP Exile from Floontown. Released in 1991 (on CD, unlike previous recordings), the album went a long way towards restoring the band's original distorted electric guitar sound, while remaining melodic and college-radio friendly. In 1992, they released the Walt's Wish EP on Cargo.

=== 1993–1996: Fitzjoy ===
Dom Pompeo quit in 1993 and was replaced by Yuri Mohacsi. That line-up released the EP Love Goes Plaid on RPN Records in Europe and Boss Tuneage in America. In 1996, they recorded and released what would be their last studio album, Fitzjoy, on Hypnotic Records. They were supposed to tour in support of the album but instead disbanded.

Friesen moved to Austin and started the band La Motta with Inland Empire bassist Alfred Mueller and drummer Wal Rashidi. In 2000, Boss Tuneage released "Greater than Later", a compilation of many old Asexuals tracks spanning years 1984 to 1996 as well as some unreleased tracks.

=== Reunion: 2010–present ===
The original line-up of the band reunited to play a reunion show at Montreal's Just for Laughs Cabaret on October 1, 2010, along with fellow Montreal punk bands the 222's, and Hollerado. They played the following March, during Canadian Music Week, at Toronto's Bovine Sex Club, and played the 2012 Osheaga Festival. In 2016, they played the Punk Rock Bowling & Music Festival in Las Vegas.

In 2017, the band went into the studio with CBC Montreal and recorded an album called Brave New Waves Session, which was released on Artoffact Records

In December 2019, the Asexuals played Montreal's Corona Theatre as part of the 40th Anniversary of London Calling, the iconic album by The Clash.

== Members ==
- John "Filthy" Kastner- Vocals (1983–1987, 2010–Present)
- Sean "Head" Friesen – Guitar (1983–1997, 2010–Present)
- Glen Collins (AKA T.J. Plenty) – Bass (1983–1987, 2010–Present), Vocals, Guitar (1987–1997)
- Paul "Wally" Remington – Drums (1983–1997, 2010–Present)
- Blake Cheetah (James Algie) – Bass (1987–1989)
- Dom Pompeo Jr – Bass (1989–1993) (d. 2012)
- Yuri Mohacsi – Bass (1993–1997)

== Discography ==
=== Albums ===
- Be What You Want (1984), First Strike Records, 1984 (re-released 1985, Psyche Industry Records
- Contemporary World (1985), Psyche Industry Records
- Dish (1988), Cargo Records
- Exile from Floontown (1991), Cargo Records
- Fitzjoy (1996), Hypnotic Records

Live albums

- Brave New Waves Session (2017), CBC Montreal, Artoffact Records

=== EPs ===
- Featuring: The Asexuals (1984), Og Music
- B.F.D. (1984), Og Music
- Change Of Heart / Asexuals, split 7-inch with the band Change of Heart). (1990), Cargo Records
- Walt's Wish (1992), Cargo Records
- Love Goes Plaid (1993), RPN Records (UK & Europe), Boss Tuneage Records

=== Compilations ===
- Contemporary World / Be What You Want (1991), Psyche Industry Records
- Greater than Later (2000), Boss Tuneage Records

Inclusions:

- "Contra-rebels" included on Primitive Air-Raid (1984), Psyche Industry Records
- "Left Behind" included on On Garde (1989), EnGuard Records
