= Mark Arnold (musician) =

American punk rock singer and guitarist

Mark Arnold (born December 23, 1961) is an American punk rock singer and guitarist, best known for two band projects Big Drill Car (1987–1995) and All Systems Go! (post-1995).
