= The Besnard Lakes Are the Dark Horse =

Studio album by the Besnard Lakes
- Released: February 20, 2007
- Recorded: Breakglass Studio (Montreal, Canada)
- Genre: Post-rock, psychedelic rock, indie rock, shoegaze
- Length: 45:26
- Label: Jagjaguwar (U.S.); Outside Music (Canada)
- Producer: Jace Lasek, Olga Goreas

The Besnard Lakes chronology
Volume 1 (2003)	The Besnard Lakes Are the Dark Horse (2007)	The Besnard Lakes Are the Roaring Night (2010)

Professional ratings
Aggregate scores
Source	Rating
Metacritic	83/100
Review scores
Source	Rating
AllMusic	4/5 stars
Drowned in Sound	9/10
musicOMH	4/5 stars
Now	4/5 stars
Pitchfork	8.2/10
Q	3.5/5 stars
Spin	3.5/5 stars
Stylus	B+
Uncut	4.5/5 stars
Under the Radar	9/10

The Besnard Lakes Are the Dark Horse (sometimes referred to as ...Are the Dark Horse) is the second studio album by the Canadian rock band the Besnard Lakes, released in 2007 (see 2007 in music). The album was The Besnard Lakes' first release on Jagjaguwar and was self-produced by bandleaders Jace Lasek and Olga Goreas. It was nominated for the 2007 Polaris Music Prize.

== Track listing ==
All songs written by Olga Goreas, Jace Lasek, except (1, 5, 6) by Goreas, Lasek, and Nicole Lizée.

No.	Title	Length
1.	"Disaster"	5:42
2.	"For Agent 13"	5:12
3.	"And You Lied to Me"	7:20
4.	"Devastation"	5:50
5.	"Because Tonight"	7:11
6.	"Rides the Rails"	4:56
7.	"On Bedford and Grand"	5:06
8.	"Cedric's War"	4:05

== Personnel ==
The Besnard Lakes

- Olga Goreas – vocals (2–8), bass (2–8), glockenspiel (2), synthesizer (4), organ (5), drums (5, 8)
- Jace Lasek – vocals (1–3, 5–8), guitars (1–3, 5–8), bass (1), drums (1, 6, 7), organ (2, 3, 5, 6), synthesizer (2, 5, 8), piano (2, 6, 7), tambourine (2, 6, 7), Rhodes electric piano (7), lap steel guitar (8)
- Kevin Laing – drums (2, 3, 4, 8)
- Nicole Lizée – all string, horn, flute and saxophone arrangements (1, 6), Rhodes (3, 7), synthesizer (3), bass (4), string arrangement (5), piano (7)
- Steve Raegele – guitars (3, 4), vocals (6)
- Richard White – guitars (not on album)

Additional musicians

- Heather Schnarr – violin (1, 5, 6)
- Sophie Trudeau – violin (1, 6)
- Chris Seligman – French horn (1, 6)
- Billy Boufford – flute (1, 6), soprano saxophone (1, 6)
- Jonathan Cummins – guitar (3, 4)
- Jerimiah Bullied – guitar (4)
- Eric LaRock – bass (4)
- George Donoso III – drums (4)
- Jean-Paul Terron – drums (4)
- The Fifth String Liberation Singers Choir (Catherine McCandless, Corri-Lynn Tetz, Elizabeth Powell, Susan Beckett, Olga Goreas) – vocals (5)

Production

- Jace Lasek – producer, recording engineer, mixing
- Olga Goreas – producer
- David William Smith – recording engineer (3)
- John Golden – mastering
- Corri-Lynn Tetz – cover painting
- Todd Stewart – illustration, design assistance
- Daniel Murphy – design assistance
