= Crush (Doughboys album) =

Studio album by Doughboys
- Released: August 3, 1993
- Recorded: Magic Shop/Baby Monster, New York City
- Studios: Magic Shop, New York City; Baby Monster, New York City
- Genres: Alternative rock, pop-punk
- Length: 45:04
- Label: A&M
- Producer: Daniel Rey

Doughboys chronology
| Happy Accidents (1990) | Crush (1993) | Turn Me On (1996) |

Singles from Crush
- 1. "Shine" Released: 1993; 2. "Fix Me" Released: 1993; 3. "Disposable" Released: 1993; 4. "Neighbourhood Villain" Released: 1994

Professional ratings
Review scores
| Source | Rating |
|---|---|
| Allmusic | 4.5/5 stars |

Crush is the 1993 album by Montreal pop-punk band Doughboys. Crush was released on A&M records and was produced by Daniel Rey and mixed by Dave Ogilvie. The album featured the single "Shine", which was a hit in Canada and was also the theme song for MuchMusic's alternative-themed show The Wedge during the 1990s.

== Overview ==
Crush was the Doughboys' first major label album; it peaked at #63 on the Canadian RPM albums chart staying on the chart for 16 weeks. The album was certified Gold in 1996. The album would go on to sell 75,000 copies in Canada.

The album spawned the top 40 hit single "Shine". Co-written with Wiz from Mega City Four, "Shine" also reached #2 on RPM Magazine's Canadian Content Charts in August 1993. In 1994, the single "Neighbourhood Villain" also cracked the top 5 of the Cancon charts.

The album was recorded at The Magic Shop in New York City and mixed at The Warehouse in Vancouver. At the 1994 Juno awards, the album was nominated for the Juno Award for Best Hard Rock Album, but lost to I Mother Earth.

== Critical reception ==
Crush earned a number of critical accolades. In 1993, the album won the CASBY Award for "Favourite Release". Toronto radio station CFNY-FM listeners voted it the 24th best album of 1993. In 1994, it was nominated for a Juno Award for "Best Hard Rock Album". The album's lead single, "Shine", was also voted by Chart Magazine readers as number 38 on their 2000 list of Top 50 Canadian Songs Of All-Time., and 189th by CFNY in their 2009 "Top 200 Songs of All Time".

The album was shortlisted for the Polaris Heritage Prize at the 2025 Polaris Music Prize.

== Track listing ==
All songs written by Doughboys unless otherwise indicated.

| No. | Title | Writer(s) | Lead vocals | Length |
|---|---|---|---|---|
| 1. | "Shine" | Doughboys, Wiz | Kastner | 2:40 |
| 2. | "Melt" | | Kastner | 2:55 |
| 3. | "Disposable" | | Verses: Arsenault, Chorus: Cummins, Bridge: Kastner | 5:14 |
| 4. | "Fix Me" | Doughboys, Wiz | Kastner | 3:06 |
| 5. | "Neighbourhood Villain" | | Kastner | 4:33 |
| 6. | "Shitty Song" | | Cummins | 3:39 |
| 7. | "Tearin' Away" | | Kastner | 3:29 |
| 8. | "Treehouse" | | Cummins | 3:19 |
| 9. | "Everything" | | Kastner | 3:22 |
| 10. | "Fall" | | Cummins | 4:15 |
| 11. | "End of the Hall" | | Kastner | 3:55 |
| 12. | "Summer Song" | | Kastner | 4:34 |

== Personnel ==
- Artwork By - David Andoff
- Bass, Vocals - Peter Arsenault
- Drums - Paul Newman
- Engineer - Bryce Goggin
- Mastered By - Howie Weinberg
- Mixed By - Dave Ogilvie
- Photography - cover and insert concept and photography Sean MacLeod
- Group photo. Andrew MacNaughton
- Producer - Daniel Rey
- Vocals, Guitar - John Kastner, Jonathan Cummins, Wiz
