= A Coliseum Complex Museum =

Studio album by The Besnard Lakes
- Released: January 22, 2016
- Recorded: 2015; Breakglass Studios
- Genre: Psychedelic rock
- Length: 38:33
- Label: Jagjaguwar

The Besnard Lakes chronology
Until in Excess, Imperceptible UFO (2013)	A Coliseum Complex Museum (2016)	The Besnard Lakes Are the Last of the Great Thunderstorm Warnings (2021)

Singles from A Coliseum Complex Museum
- 1. "Golden Lion" Released: November 13, 2015

A Coliseum Complex Museum is the fifth studio album by the Canadian psychedelic rock band The Besnard Lakes, released on January 22, 2016, on Jagjaguwar. The album is the first to feature keyboardist Sheenah Ko and guitarist Robbie MacArthur, who both joined the band in 2014 to tour behind the band's previous album, Until in Excess, Imperceptible UFO (2013).

The album was preceded by the EP Golden Lion, which features two additional tracks recorded during the album's sessions.

== Writing and composition ==
The album features shorter compositions than those on the band's previous two studio albums, Until in Excess, Imperceptible UFO (2013) and The Besnard Lakes Are the Roaring Night (2010). Regarding this, vocalist and guitarist Jace Lasek noted: "This [album] pulls us back in; we were curious to see if it was still possible for us to make something and be happy with it if things were a little more compact and condensed. It worked and it was super fun doing it as well."

== Critical reception ==
Professional ratings
Review scores
Source	Rating
Exclaim!	6/10
Pitchfork	6.5/10

Writing for Exclaim!, Dave Mix was critical of the album's sameness, but called it "another impeccably crafted psychedelic rock record sure to please fans of the genre." In a mostly positive review for Pitchfork, Evan Rytlewski did, however, criticize the album for sounding too similar to its predecessors: "Coliseum stacks everything in the right place, and it’s all executed with the usual precision, so why doesn’t the album dazzle quite like the last few? Like the four albums before it, the Besnards self-recorded and self-produced this one at Breakglass, and more than its predecessors, it begs for an outside collaborator, somebody to shake up the band’s routine and perhaps lend some new tricks to their shrinking playbook."

== Track listing ==
No.	Title	Length
1.	"The Bray Road Beast"	5:30
2.	"Golden Lion"	3:48
3.	"Pressure of Our Plans"	5:21
4.	"Towers Sent Her to Sheets of Sound"	4:28
5.	"The Plain Moon"	4:26
6.	"Necronomicon"	3:40
7.	"Nightingale"	5:08
8.	"Tungsten 4 - The Refugee"	6:12
Total length:		38:33
