= Darren Brown (musician) =

English musician (1962–2006)

Wiz
- Born: Darren Mark Brown; 18 January 1962; London, England
- Origin: Farnborough, Hampshire, England
- Died: 6 December 2006 (aged 44) Tooting, South London, England
- Genres: Alternative rock, punk rock
- Occupations: Musician, songwriter, singer
- Instruments: Guitar, vocals
- Years active: 1982–2006
- Website: http://www.megacityfour.co.uk

Darren Mark Brown (18 January 1962 – 6 December 2006), known as Wiz, was an English musician who was the lead-singer and guitarist of indie punk band Mega City Four in the late 1980s and early 1990s, and later bands Serpico and Ipanema from 2002 to 2006.

== Mega City Four ==
Mega City Four consisted of guitarist/vocalist Wiz, his brother and rhythm guitarist/vocalist Danny Brown, bassist/vocalist Gerry Bryant and drummer Chris Jones.

The group were noted for their hard-working ethics and extensive touring ethos. They performed some gigs around their local town of Farnborough before making their vinyl debut in September 1987 with “Miles Apart”/“Running in Darkness”. The single led to a round of gigs with bands such as Senseless Things and Snuff.

The band continued to tour extensively around the UK, across Europe and over to North America, working with bands including Les Thugs, Midway Still, Ned's Atomic Dustbin, Carter The Unstoppable Sex Machine and Doughboys, amongst many others. The band also had the opportunity to perform in festivals such as the Reading Festival 1990/1992, Glastonbury Festival 1993, and Phoenix Festival 1994, as well as others. The band's second studio album, Who Cares Wins (1990), was followed by a compilation of their early 7" singles, called Terribly Sorry Bob (1991). The band subsequently moved to a major record label, Big Life Records, to record two further studio albums, Sebastopol Rd. (1992) and Magic Bullets (1994). After falling out with their record label, they moved to Fire Records to record their final studio album, Soulscraper (1996). In addition to their studio albums, the band also released a live LP, a Peel Sessions disc, and a number of singles.

== Ned's Atomic Dustbin and Doughboys ==
Wiz had already played with Ned's Atomic Dustbin in 1995, filling-in for original guitarist Rat for a tour and promo events in the United States of America. Mega City Four had been together for over a decade when they broke up in early 1996. Wiz moved to Montreal and joined Canadian alternative rock band Doughboys, replacing guitarist Jonathan Cummins for the remainder of the band's then tour. He co-wrote two songs each on their albums Turn Me On (1996) and Crush (1993), including "Shine".

== Later career: Serpico and Ipanema ==
Wiz and Gerry Bryant continued playing together for a short time in Serpico after the demise of Mega City Four. The band existed between 1999 and 2002, although Gerry left in 1998 to be replaced by Simon. In 2000, Serpico released the mini-album Everyone Versus Everyone and supported The Wonder Stuff at a gig at The Forum, Kentish Town.

After Serpico, Wiz went on to form Ipanema with the remaining members of Serpico (Simon & Paddy) who, after several line-up changes, were playing and recording until his death. In 2003, the band recorded their double A-side single, "Je Suis Un Baseball Bat"/"Skull". After the single was released, the band recorded and released two albums, Me Me Me in 2005, and their self-titled Ipanema in 2008, which contained all of the songs the band had recorded plus nine unreleased songs. album

== Death ==
Just after returning from a tour of the United States, Wiz collapsed at a band rehearsal. It was announced that he had died at St George's Hospital, Tooting, South London, from a blood clot in his brain on 6 December 2006.
