= God Fodder =

Studio album by Ned's Atomic Dustbin
- Released: 1 April 1991
- Recorded: December 1990 – January 1991
- Studio: Greenhouse, London
- Genre: Alternative rock; grebo; shoegaze
- Length: 40:42
- Label: Columbia
- Producer: Ned's Atomic Dustbin; Jessica Corcoran

Ned's Atomic Dustbin chronology
Bite (1990)	God Fodder (1991)	Are You Normal? (1992)

God Fodder is the debut studio album by English rock band Ned's Atomic Dustbin, released on 1 April 1991 by Columbia Records. After creating their own imprint following the success of several prior independent singles, the band recorded the album from December 1990 to January 1991 in London. Musically, God Fodder takes large influence from grebo, shoegaze, noise pop, and dance music, characterized by noisy guitars, complex drum beats, and its usage of two bass players, with Matt Cheslin playing regular bass lines and Alex Griffin playing harmonic bass lines. Lyrically, the album features communal efforts written by all the band.

Five different singles were released from God Fodder across different regions. Upon its release, the album was a critical and commercial success, reaching number 4 in the UK Albums Chart; it also found an audience in the United States, where the album reached number 91 on the Billboard 200, largely due to the band's T-shirt campaign and the videos for “Kill Your Television” and "Grey Cell Green", which gained traction on MTV's 120 Minutes. The record's success is said to be a triumph against the dominance of grunge music at the time. The album was named among the year's best albums by several magazines. The band played the album in its entirety for the first time in O2 Shepherd's Bush Empire in December 2009 and played it again in Birmingham in September 2010.

== Background and recording ==
Ned's Atomic Dustbin formed in Stourbridge in 1987. Although the band had started out as a gothic rock band, the band "had developed a dense, assaultive sound" by the early 1990s "that was distinguished by their thundering two-bass attack." After releasing The Ingredients EP, the band's official first single, "Kill Your Television", which later featured on God Fodder, was a commercial success, reaching number 53 on the UK Singles Chart and number one on the UK Independent Singles Chart and becoming critically acclaimed; furthermore, it heralded the band's new grebo sound which they would fully explore on God Fodder. The success of the single led to the band signing to Sony Music, on the grounds that the band would be allowed to release their music through their own label, Furtive, in order to retain a higher degree of creative control whilst concurrently enjoying the benefits of Sony's major label distribution and advertising clout.

The band recorded their official debut album, God Fodder, between December 1990 and January 1991 at Greenhouse Studios, London, co-producing the record with Jessica Cocoran. Whilst the band were adding the final touches to God Fodder, the band's former label Chapter 22 released Bite, a compilation of early tracks, including the tracks from The Ingredients EP and the 'Kill Your Television" single, alongside some other tracks, without the band's input, knowledge or consent.

== Style ==
=== Music ===
"God Fodder focused on the hyper punk aspect of England's "grebo" movement, relying on insanely catchy hooks and the band's dual-bass sound to keep things interesting."

— Nitsuh Abebe

God Fodder combines grebo music, a "punk-influenced, electronica-informed, hyper, light-hearted rock" genre with which the band were associated, with shoegaze music, a genre which forms the album's "prevailing beat". The album was described as a "blend of frenzied, melodic rock, with the occasional touch of quirkiness", such as the band's usage of two bass players, with Matt Cheslin playing "normal basslines" whilst Alex Griffin "scratching out harmonic riffs." Besides the twin bass work, the album also features complicated drum beats and distorted guitars throughout. Trouser Press said the album combines catchy melodies, "pulsing adrenaline beats" and "a wool-covered wall of fuzzy pop noise on which able singer Jonn Penney pastes challenging personal lyrics."

The album features influences from shoegaze bands such as Ride, numerous Los Angeles bands and "a random selection of English bands" including New Order, Icicle Works and The Wedding Present; all such influences were described as being presented in "bits" or "pinches". The band use Peavey Electronics distortion on the album. Rowdy album opener and college radio hit "Kill Your Television" previously featured on the Bite release and features "chucked cobblestone sloganeering" and was described by one reviewer as getting the album "off to a strong, provocative start." "Grey Cell Green", also a college radio hit, has been described as "memorable". "Selfish" is said to meld "rude dance rhythms" with "nasty guitar."

=== Lyrics ===
Like several bands of the era, the band's bassist Alex Griffin explained that the songs on God Fodder were "communal efforts", saying "It's a lot more gratifying than working with just a single songwriter. One person brings in a 10-second idea and we build on that. It's definitely a group thing," adding that "When people tell me what one of our songs means, I say, 'Yep, you're right.' I'm not gonna dash their dreams." "Selfish" is a critique on "trendies, the apathetic and mean-spirited," and opens with a sample of the Die Hard dialogue "why don't you wake up and smell what you're shovelling?," which the band included after watching the film and decided it "fitted in really well." "Happy" was written by lead singer Jonn Penney, who, as Griffin explained, "writes really vague and about personal situations not necessarily his own. He doesn't like to explain." Penney's lyrics on God Fodder have been described as personal and challenging.

"Kill Your Television" was inspired by a sticker that Griffin purchased in Mystic, Connecticut a few years prior to the song's release whilst visiting with friends in Boston: "I had [the sticker] on my bass [while] we were in the process of writing a song which had nothing to do with television, and Penney saw it and thought it would be a good title. We like slogans; you don't forget them. So the lyrics were rewritten and [the song] became about television." The "sneering, cryptic tag line" which ends the song, "soap for sore eyes," is a reference to the band's guitarist Rat who watched every soap opera on television, much to Penney's disgust.

== Release ==
"The 'Grey Cell Green' video caused a real public reaction, but it was the infamous T-shirt campaign that really got everybody's attention. Until that time, it hadn't jumped up and grabbed people by the throat."

— Billboard expelling the album's gradual success build in the United States.

God Fodder was released on 1 April 1991 by the band's own Sony Music imprint Furtive Records in the UK, whilst in the United States, the album was released by Columbia Records, another Sony label, on 2 July 1991. The band played concerts throughout the year worldwide in promotion of God Fodder, playing alongside bands such as, amongst others, Mega City Four, Senseless Things and Jesus Jones. The band also appeared twice on Top of the Pops in the UK. In as early as July 1991, the NME, noted that the band were, along with The KLF, Seal, The La's and Electronic, making their mark in the United States.

Several singles were released from the album; "Kill Your Television" was released in the UK in 1990 before the album was recorded and in 1992 in the United States. It reached number 53 in the UK Singles Chart and number 1 in the UK Independent Singles Chart. The second single, "Until You Find Out", was also released in 1990 and reached number 51 in the UK charts. The first official single from the album and first Sony release, "Happy," was the third single, and reaching number 16 in the UK singles chart in March 1991 and number 11 in the US Modern Rock Tracks chart. "Trust" was the final single released in the UK, reaching number 21 in September 1991, whilst "Grey Cell Green" was the final American single, reaching number 24 in the US Modern Rock Tracks chart.

The album was a commercial success, reaching number 4 on the UK Albums Chart and spending five weeks on the chart in total. In the United States, the album entered the Top Heatseekers Albums chart at number 9 in October 1991, and ultimately "graduated" when it entered and peaked at number 91 on the official Billboard 200 chart in February 1992. The album's gradual success in the United States lead to Billboard magazine including it in their list of the "Popular Uprising: Class of '92" in June 1992, where Columbia sales director John Doyce explained "they'd played and toured a lot of the alternative markets, and we got a real strong sense that the album would continue to sell." The magazine credited the album's gradual stateside success largely to the band's T-shirt campaign, referring to the band's own distinctive T-shirts, with over 86 different designs being produced within three years (1987–1990).

On 1 February 1992, God Fodder was certified "Silver" by the British Phonographic Industry (BPI) for sales of over 60,000 copies in the United Kingdom. It has been reported that over 60,000 copies were sold in the first week alone. In the United States, the album has sold over 400,000 copies. As of 2013, God Fodder is estimated to have sold around 500,000 copies worldwide.

== Reception and legacy ==
Professional ratings
Review scores
Source	Rating
AllMusic	4/5 stars
Chicago Tribune	2/4 stars
Los Angeles Times	2.5/4 stars
Sounds	4/5 stars

The album received generally positive reviews. At the end of 1991, several magazines included the album on their lists of the top 50 albums of the year; NME ranked it 23rd, whilst Select ranked it 39th. "Kill Your Television" had already ranked at number 37 in NME's list of the top 50 singles of 1990, whilst it also ranked at number 26 in the same year's edition of the Festive Fifty, a poll of the top 50 songs of the year assembled by John Peel listeners. The Morning Call referred to the record as a "fine" album. The Chicago Tribune concluded that the band "sounds like a mishmash of psychedelic Clash meets Spandau Ballet—the former is appreciated, the latter needs to be eliminated." The Los Angeles Times opined that "all that's needed is memorable songs, though the sound and attitude are enough to get by on this promising debut."

Retrospective commentary on the album has been generally favourable, with some critics citing it as their best album. Nitsuh Abebe of AllMusic said that God Fodder was arguably the band's best album and adding that, although the album may not be groundbreaking, it was "certainly solid." The reviewer also said the album was "consistently satisfying" and mentioned how the band's "light and hooky" sound was enough "to put quite a distance between their oeuvre and that of the average grebo or punk band." Trouser Press was also favourable, praising the album's "strong start" and saying that, "derivative to the core, the Neds pinch bits from a random selection of English bands (Wedding Present, Icicle Works, New Order, etc.), but they do so with such breathless enthusiasm that it suits the good-natured cheesiness of the whole endeavor."

In 2013, Kyle Ryan of The A.V. Club spoke of how "Grey Cell Green" and "Happy" were "jams back in the day" and how the latter songs remained one of his "all-time favourite songs." Less favourable to God Fodder was Pitchfork Media's Chris Ott, saying that "Ned Atomic Dustbin's shook their long-on-top dos to the prevailing beat–namely shoegaze. A pinch of Swervedriver, a touch of Ride, the cheesy Peavey distortion of a thousand bad L.A. bands and some timely looks?" In 2003, the website included it at number 10 in their list of "Castoffs and Cutouts: The Top 50 Most Common Used CDs."

In 2010, Magnet magazine ranked the song "Happy" at number 11 in their list of "120 Reasons to Live," a list celebrating the 1990s underground music that was aired on MTV's alternative music show 120 Minutes. in the description for the song's entry, the magazine cited God Fodder as their best album and spoke of how its double-bass approach helped the band survive the dominance of grunge music, saying that despite there being "a lot to dislike" about the band in retrospect, such as their "terrible style" of "baggy clothes, dreadlocks—a vaguely secondhand hippie-punk look", having "a guitarist named Rat", a "whimsical" album title in God Fodder and two bass players, the latter is what helped make the band unique:

"Actually, the double-bass approach is what elevated Ned’s Atomic Dustbin above the grunge floodwaters that drowned just about every other U.K. band in the early '90s: Ned's pairing of Hüsker Dü-style distorted guitars with an overzealous rhythm section was successful for the duration of one album. 1991 debut God Fodder was loaded with singles, with "Happy" and "Grey Cell Green" among the best efforts at bridging the gap between Britpop and American punk influences. Ned’s Atomic Dustbin went on to record two more albums, but God Fodder is its classic—the band reunited to perform the album in its entirety in London last year."

== Live concerts ==
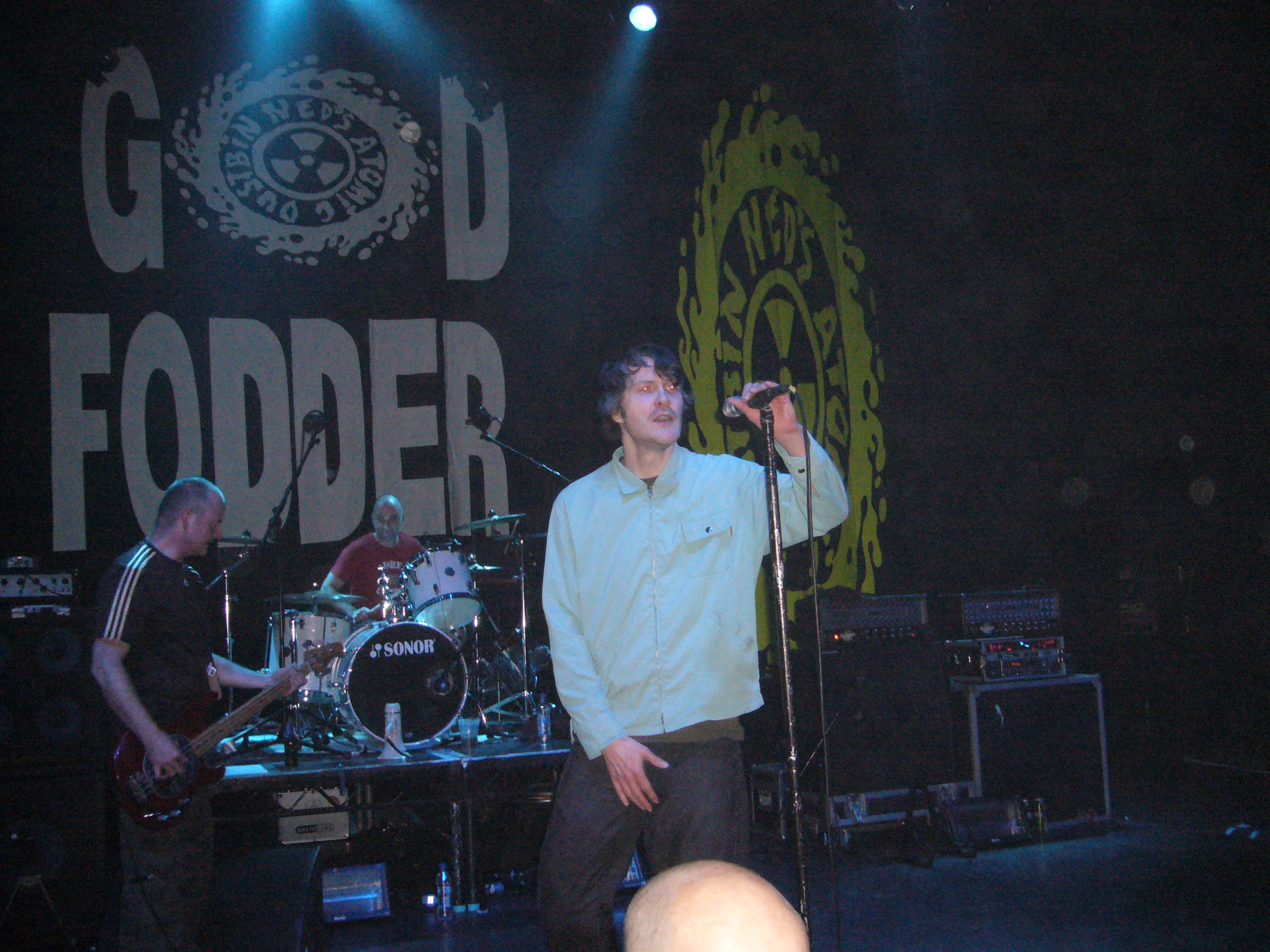
The band playing God Fodder at O2 Shepherd's Bush Empire in 2009.

Having reformed in 2009, all five original members of the band played God Fodder from start to finish in London, on 19 December 2009 at the O2 Shepherd's Bush Empire. After playing the album, the band played other tracks from their catalogue. One of the band's classic T-shirt designs was sold at the show's merchandise stand for the first time since the God Fodder era. The concert was critically acclaimed.

The band played the entirety of the album again at the Digbeth Institute in Birmingham on 25 September 2010 as part of the institute's reopening. Interviewed prior to the Birmingham concert, Penney stated that "back when we first toured God Fodder, we didn’t play in Birmingham and that’s something we’ll be very happy to address all these years later. We can’t wait to christen the new venue and set a new bar-takings record."

Speaking to The Birmingham Mail, Penney said "we played the whole of God Fodder at Shepherd’s Bush in London last Christmas and we thought it would be nice to do it in the Midlands as well. It captures that moment in the 90s when the indie scene in Birmingham and the Black Country was buzzing. It’s quite a fast little album and it’s over fairly quickly, so we’ll come back on and do a Best of set."

== Track listing ==
All songs written by Ned's Atomic Dustbin.

1. "Kill Your Television" – 2:59
2. "Less Than Useful" – 4:05
3. "Selfish" – 3:54
4. "Grey Cell Green" – 3:47
5. "Cut Up" – 3:07
6. "Throwing Things" – 3:24
7. "Capital Letters" – 2:55
8. "Happy" – 3:59
9. "Your Complex" – 2:38
10. "Nothing Like" – 2:41
11. "Until You Find Out" – 3:10
12. "You" – 2:03
13. "What Gives My Son?" 2:48

== Personnel ==
Adapted from the liner notes.

- Dan Dan the Fast Drumming Man
- Alex Plays One Bass
- Mat the Other
- Rat: Does the Guitar
- and Jonn Sings.

== Charts ==
Chart performance for God Fodder
Chart (1991–1992)	Peak position
Australian Albums (ARIA)	95
UK Albums (OCC)	4
US Billboard 200	91
