= The Besnard Lakes Are the Last of the Great Thunderstorm Warnings =

Studio album by The Besnard Lakes
- Released: January 29, 2021
- Genre: Psychedelic rock
- Length: 71:11
- Labels: FatCat Records, Flemish Eye, Full Time Hobby

The Besnard Lakes chronology
A Coliseum Complex Museum (2016)	The Besnard Lakes Are the Last of the Great Thunderstorm Warnings (2021)	The Besnard Lakes Are the Ghost Nation (2025)

Singles from The Besnard Lakes Are the Last of the Great Thunderstorm Warnings
- 1. "Raindrops" Released: October 22, 2020; 2. "Our Heads, Our Hearts on Fire Again" Released: December 17, 2020

The Besnard Lakes Are the Last of the Great Thunderstorm Warnings is the sixth studio album by Canadian psychedelic rock band the Besnard Lakes. It was released on January 29, 2021, on Flemish Eye Records in Canada, FatCat Records in the United States, and Full Time Hobby Records in the rest of the world.

== Background ==
The music featured on the album was originally written ten years prior as a single track film score. It was the band's first double album.

The album's release was preceded by the singles "Raindrops" and "Our Heads, Our Hearts on Fire Again", as well as a digital release of the "OMD-style" pop song "Feuds With Guns".

== Critical reception ==
Professional ratings
Aggregate scores
Source	Rating
AnyDecentMusic?	7.3/10
Metacritic	81/100
Review scores
Source	Rating
AllMusic	4/5 stars
The Arts Desk	3/5 stars
Beats Per Minute	78%
Exclaim!	7/10
Mojo	4/5 stars
Spectrum Culture	8/10
Uncut	8/10
Under the Radar	7/10 stars

The album was met with favourable reviews from critics. At Metacritic, which assigns a weighted average rating out of 100 to reviews from mainstream publications, this release received an average score of 81, based on 10 reviews, which indicates "universal acclaim". Review aggregator AnyDecentMusic? gave the release a 7.3/10 based on a critical consensus of 10 reviews.

== Track listing ==
All tracks are written by Jace Lasek and Olga Goreas.

No.	Title	Length
1.	"Blackstrap"	6:35
2.	"Raindrops"	5:10
3.	"Christmas Can Wait"	8:03
4.	"Our Heads, Our Hearts on Fire Again"	6:29
5.	"Feuds with Guns"	4:21
6.	"The Dark Side of Paradise"	8:58
7.	"New Revolution"	6:54
8.	"The Father of Time Wakes Up"	6:48
9.	"Last of the Great Thunderstorm Warnings"	17:53

== Personnel ==
Taken from official website

- Olga Goreas – writer, producer, composer
- Philip Gosselin – mastering
- Jace Lasek – writer, producer, composer, mixing

Artwork

- Olga Goreas – handwritten font
- Todd Stewart – inside gatefold design
- Corri-Lynn Tetz – front and back cover
- Dave Thomas – album layout
