= Happy Accidents =

Happy Accidents may refer to:

- Happy Accidents (film), starring Marisa Tomei and Vincent D'Onofrio
- Happy Accidents (album), a 1990 album by the Doughboys
- Happy Accidents (band), an English pop punk band.
- Happy Accidents, a 2011 book by actress Jane Lynch
- "Happy Accidents", a 1989 episode of Shining Time Station
- Happy Accident, a 1998 album by The Albion Band
- "Happy Accidents", a song by Saint Motel from Saintmotelevision
- Happy accidents, catch-phrase of painter Bob Ross
- Serendipity, a fortunate happenstance by "active luck", where chance encounters human action
