= Until in Excess, Imperceptible UFO =

Studio album by The Besnard Lakes
- Released: April 2, 2013
- Genre: Indie rock
- Length: 48:38
- Label: Jagjaguwar

The Besnard Lakes chronology
The Besnard Lakes Are the Roaring Night (2010)	Until in Excess, Imperceptible UFO (2013)	A Coliseum Complex Museum (2016)

Until in Excess, Imperceptible UFO is the fourth studio album by Canadian indie rock band The Besnard Lakes, released in April 2013 on Jagjaguwar.

The album was named a longlisted nominee for the 2013 Polaris Music Prize on June 13, 2013.

== Recording ==
The recording of Until in Excess, Imperceptible UFO featured greater involvement from guitarist Richard White and drummer Kevin Laing, with vocalist and guitarist Jace Lasek noting: "Now, everybody feels that they've invested in the same thing. The four of us feel quite proud and strong about this record because we all worked on it. Kevin and Richard saw more of the creative process than they had before and that really helped bring the band together."

== Album title ==
Regarding the album's title, Lasek stated: "We played in Paris at the end of the Roaring Night touring cycle and there was a review of one of our shows that was written in French. Our then-label manager found it on the internet and sent it to us but he'd Google-translated it when he sent it, and it said something along the lines of: "The Besnard Lakes create this atmosphere of whatever" and then it said, "until in excess, imperceptible UFO". I was like, 'That's amazing!' I have no idea what that means but it kinda describes us perfectly!"

== Critical response ==
Professional ratings
Aggregate scores
Source	Rating
Metacritic	76/100
Review scores
Source	Rating
AllMusic	4/5 stars
Pitchfork	7.3/10
Toronto Star	3/4 stars

Until in Excess, Imperceptible UFO was released to some critical acclaim. At Metacritic, which assigns a weighted average score out of 100 to reviews and ratings from mainstream critics, the album received a metascore of 76, based on 16 reviews, indicating "generally favorable reviews".

== Track listing ==
All tracks are written by Olga Goreas & Jace Lasek.

No.	Title	Length
1.	"46 Satires"	6:44
2.	"And Her Eyes Were Painted Gold"	5:24
3.	"People of the Sticks"	5:27
4.	"The Specter"	6:32
5.	"At Midnight"	5:49
6.	"Catalina"	6:14
7.	"Colour Yr Lights In"	5:24
8.	"Alamogordo"	7:04
