= Dead Messenger =

Power pop/rock band

- Origin: Montreal, Quebec, Canada
- Genres: Power pop
- Members: Alex Chavel; Tim Harbinson; Roger White; Ted Yates
- Past members: Sebastien Marin; Charlton Snow
- Website: www.deadmessenger.com

Dead Messenger is a Canadian power pop/rock band from Montreal, Quebec, Canada. They have released 3 albums, and their frenetic, high energy live performances have garnered them a reputation as one of the best live bands in Montreal.

== History ==
The Band was formed in 2005 by Roger White (guitar, lead Vox), Ted Yates (lead guitar), Sebastien Marin (bass), and Charlton Snow (drums). In 2006, they released a self-titled album that was recorded by ex Planet Smashers drummer Tim Doyl in Montreal and mixed by Jordon Zadorozny at his French Kiss Studios in Pembroke, Ontario.

In 2007, Dead Messenger went on hiatus and Sebastien Marin left the band. In early 2008, the band reformed with Alex Chavel on bass and began working on new material. In the fall of that year, they recorded Love Is the Only Weapon at Breakglass Studios in Montreal. The album was produced by Jonathan Cummins (ex doughboys, Bionic) and engineered by Jace Lasek (The Besnard Lakes).

The band has played such festivals as Pop Montreal, Canadian Music Week, NXNE, Pitter Patter Fest, and UnPop Montreal, as well as performing live at the 2011 GAMIQ awards (Gala Alternatif de la Musique Indépendante du Québec).

Love Is The Only Weapon was rated 96 on CKUT Montreal top 100 Albums chart for 2009.

In February 2013, Dead Messenger released Recharger. The album was initially intended to be a follow-up EP to Love Is The Only Weapon and was to be released in early 2011. Recharger was being recorded at The Pound, an underground live venue/art gallery/cultural space and home base to the band. Recording was cut short due to the Pound having to close its doors as the result of a lack of permits. Shortly after this lead guitarist Ted Yates became seriously ill and spent the better part of a year in and out of the hospital. White, Chavel, and Snow briefly considered disbanding the group as the severity of Yates's illness became apparent, but decided to continue on and record a full-length at the urging of Yates, with Yates contributing as a writer but unable to attend pre production rehearsals. Using Yates's condition as an inspiration, Recharger explores themes of life, death, and starting over, and has a much more conceptual and atmospheric feel than its predecessor.

Recharger was recorded by Roger White and Alex Chavel and Mixed By Aaron Holmberg

Recharger debuted in February 2013 at #167 in the Top 200 National College Radio Chart in Canada.

Charlton Snow left the band in the summer of 2015, he was replaced by Tim Harbinson formerly of the band, Laki Mera.

In 2015, four of the band's songs were featured in CBC's critically acclaimed drama This Life.

== Members ==
=== Current ===
- Roger White - Guitar, Lead Vox (2005–present)
- Ted Yates - Lead Guitar, Vox (2005–present)
- Tim Harbinson - Drums (2015–present)
- Alex Chavel - Bass, Vox (2008–present)

=== Former members ===
- Sebastien Marin - Bass, Vox (2005–2007)
- Charlton Snow - Drums (2005–2015)

== Discography ==
- Dead Messenger (2006)
- Love Is The Only Weapon (2009)
- Recharger (2013)
- The Owl in Daylight (2016)

== Videography ==
- Fat Black Heart (2009)
- Toothcomb (2013)
- Can't Help Myself (2013)
