= Misty Medley =

Studio album by Kiss Me Deadly
- Released: 4 October 2005
- Genres: Indie rock, post-rock, shoegaze
- Length: 50:25
- Label: Alien8 Recordings
- Producers: Kiss Me Deadly, Jace Lasek

Kiss Me Deadly chronology
Travel Light (2002)	Misty Medley (2005)	Live at Shubas 03/02/2006 (2006)

Misty Medley is the second full-length album by the Montreal indie rock band Kiss Me Deadly, released in October 2005 by Alien8 Recordings. Working with The Besnard Lakes' Jace Lasek, the band included reworked versions of the four songs on their 2005 EP Amoureux Cosmiques that featured "breathy vocals, saturated pop tones and melodies motorized by punk", according to The Montreal Mirror. Misty Medley spent several weeks on the Canadian "National Campus Top 50 Chart" published by ChartAttack, debuting at #25. The band toured the U.S. the following year in support of the album, alongside Voxtrot and We Are Wolves. Critics particularly noted the four aptly-named "Dance" tracks, with "Dance 1" and "Dance 4" also proving to be the most popular with listeners.

== Reception ==
Professional ratings
Review scores
Source	Rating
AllMusic	3.5/5 stars
ChartAttack	3/5 stars
Drowned in Sound	(8/10)
Hour Community	4/5 stars
Pitchfork	(7.8/10)
PopMatters	(6/10)

"...classic, melodic dance pop that is still challenging thanks to the hushed, breathy, and alluring vocals of lead singer Emily Elizabeth." - AllMusic

"Best are the four numbered "Dance" tracks, propelled by drums, guitar and Elizabeth." - ChartAttack

"...an album that sees beats and post-rock meet perfectly at make out point." - Drowned in Sound

"...one of the most graceful and unaffectedly charming little records you’ve heard in a while." - Hour Community

"...lusciously ethereal post-rock..." - Pitchfork

"The steady bounce and swirling tones of Misty Medley suggest shoegazers like Slowdive but there’s a distinct ‘80s edge as well." - PopMatters

"The album blends shoe-gazing guitar work, danceable bass and beats with Elizabeth's breathy singing and punk-like yelps..." - Ottawa XPress

"...a polished product of rock, dance floor, harmonies and melodies." - Nightlife Magazine

"...it's Emily Elizabeth's vocal on most of the tracks that is what really mark this band out." - furthernoise.org

"...shoegazey pop..." - Music Emissions

"...first imagine that Kiss Me Deadly is your standard spacey post-rock band. Then take that soaring, cold remoteness and weld it to the hotter, visceral twang and stomp of mid-90s indie groups..." - The Williams Record

"...a dazzling page in the post-punk diary, highlighted by Emily Elizabeth’s wispy, sexual screams." - Exclaim!

"...the breathy-to-shrill-voiced Emily Elizabeth does her thing over electronic swirls of guitar-pop..." - Canadian Musician

"Between the vacuumish vocal effects, the mechanical pumping of the rhythm and twinkling guitars, this album feels a soundtrack for romance on space station Mir—only with more screaming." - Silver Soundz

"...a college radio classic in the making. There is a virtual feast of mid-to-late-’80s alternative rock spread throughout the disc." - The Coast

"...an irresistible arrangement of loops, beats, bass, fuzz, melody and contagious energy that, while drawing from every worthwhile scene of the '80s and '90s, somehow eludes comparison." - I Heart Music

"...combines Elizabeth's distinct vocal range with a lush, layered sound to create songs spacey enough to justify the album's cover but danceable enough to keep those shoes hard to stare at." - Prefix

"...somewhere between their contemporary dancepunk brethren like The Rapture and the 4AD sound of the late '80s..." - Treble

== Track listing ==
All tracks written by Kiss Me Deadly.

1. "Dance 4" – 5:16
2. "Dance 2" – 5:32
3. "Pop" – 4:48
4. "Let's" – 3:51
5. "Dance 3" – 4:19
6. "Ballads" – 5:14
7. "Misty Medley" – 4:27
8. "Distress Call" – 5:02
9. "Dance 1" – 4:57
10. "Groove" – 5:27
11. Untitled track – 1:32

== Personnel ==
Kiss Me Deadly

- Emily Elizabeth – vocals, guitar
- Adam Poulin – guitar, vocals and programming
- Mathieu Dumontier – bass, vocals (formerly of Bonjour Brumaire, Statue Park, Orcondor, Thin Blue Line, Blurry Eyes)
- Erik Petersen – drums
- Sophie Trudeau – violin

Additional musicians

- Jace Lasek – additional instrumentation
- Olga Goreas – additional vocals on "Pop"

Technical personnel

- Kiss Me Deadly – producer
- Jace Lasek – producer, engineering
- John Golden – mastering

Artwork

- Tyler Stout
