= Light Conductor =

Light Conductor is a Canadian ambient music ensemble from Montreal. The group is composed of Jace Lasek, a member of The Besnard Lakes, and Stephen Ramsay, a member of Young Galaxy.

== History ==
Light Conductor signed with Constellation Records and released their first full-length album, Sequence One in 2019 with the label. In 2021 they released a single, Triggering the Radio Storms, and later that year a second album, Sequence Two.

== Discography ==
- Sequence One (Constellation, 2019)
- Sequence Two (Constellation, 2021)
- Sequence Three (Constellation, 2026)
