= Doughboys (Canadian band) =

Canadian alternative rock band

- Origin: Montreal, Quebec, Canada
- Genres: punk rock; alternative rock; post-hardcore; pop-punk; power pop
- Years active: 1986–1997, 2011
- Labels: Restless Records, A&M
- Past members: John Kastner; Jonathan "Widdalee" Cummins; Paul Newman; Jon "BondHead" Asencio; Brock Pytel; Peter Arsenault; John DesLauriers; Scott McCullough; Darren "Wiz" Brown; Mark Arnold

The Doughboys were a Canadian alternative rock band founded in 1987 that blended punk and pop and were active in the late 1980s and early/mid-1990s.

== History ==
=== Early years ===
The band was formed in Montreal by John Kastner in 1987 following his departure from the Asexuals. That year the Doughboys released their debut album Whatever on the Pipeline Records label. In 1996 and 2000 Chart magazine ranked Whatever as the 28th greatest Canadian album of all time.

Throughout their existence the band was characterized by frequent lineup changes. Original guitarist Scott McCullough went on to form Rusty, so Kastner recruited Jonathan Cummins from the punk band Circus Lupus after Cummins had moved to Montreal from Toronto. Jon Asencio (aka John Bondhead) played bass and Brock Pytel was the band's drummer. The band began working with manager/producer Dan McConomy who was working on a film by producer Robin Spry that needed a song for a skateboard scene. McConomy asked the band to re-record the guitar solos with Jonathan Cummins. Even though the original label Restless Records had gone bankrupt a deal was arranged so that Electric Distribution in Canada and Malaco in the United States could release the album. The band opened for Red Hot Chili Peppers on their Canadian tour after attaining the No. 1 spot on Independent Retail Sales and College Radio Chart.

Their second album Home Again was released in 1988 on Restless Records.

Pytel left the band in 1990 and moved to India to study meditation. He was replaced by Paul Newman on the band's third album, Happy Accidents. After that album's release and tour Asencio left and was replaced by bassist John Deslaurier, who appeared on the subsequent 5-song EP When Up Turns to Down that features a cover of the B-52s "Private Idaho". The EP was released as part of the contract buyout by Enigma/Restless.

=== Mainstream success ===
Deslaurier left in 1992 and was replaced by Peter Arsenault, formerly of the band Jellyfishbabies. Manager James MacLean arranged a buyout of the band's existing recording contract with the US label Restless/Enigma Records and the band signed with A&M Records.

They then recruited Daniel Rey and Dave Ogilvie to produce their major label debut, Crush, which was released in August 1993. "Shine" was that album's lead single and became the band's biggest Top 40 hit. Shine won a CASBY for best single in 1994. "Neighbourhood Villain" and "Fix Me" were also notable singles from the album. Crush was certified gold in Canada in 1996. "Shine" meanwhile was voted in 2000 as the 26th "Top Canadian Single of All Time" by Chart magazine, and was used by Canadian music video channel Much Music as the theme song for their alternative rock show called "The Wedge."

In 1996, the band released their final album, Turn Me On. The album furthered the band's pop-punk style. It was coproduced by Ted Niceley and Daniel Rey. The album spawned the singles "I Never Liked You" and "Everything and After", which peaked at #50 and #28 in Canada on the RPM Top Singles chart, respectively. Cummins subsequently left the band, citing the band's "lack of edge" and commercial sellout. He was replaced for the remainder of the band's tour by Wiz, the former singer/guitarist for Mega City Four. Wiz co-wrote two songs each on Turn Me On and Crush, including "Shine". However, following the end of that tour (as the opening act for The Offspring) in 1997, the band broke up.

In 2003 their first demo La Majeure was released.

=== Post-breakup ===
Kastner subsequently formed All Systems Go! with Mark Arnold and Frank Daly of Big Drill Car. He was married to Nicole de Boer. His first solo album entitled Have You Seen Lucky was released in June 2006. He has also composed a number of film and TV soundtracks, including work on Phil the Alien, Universal Soldier and B.R.A.T.S of the Lost Nebula. In 2000 Kastner along with Jon Bond Head made a guest appearance on Brock Pytel's solo album Second Choice. In 2008 Kastner toured with Bran Van 3000 and recorded an album with them.

Cummins formed the band Bionic. He also produced a number of albums, and also spent a six-month stint playing with the Besnard Lakes. He writes a music column for The Montreal Mirror.

Wiz formed Serpico and Ipanema, but died in London, England on December 6, 2006 from a blood clot on the brain.

Paul Newman worked as a road manager after the Doughboys broke up. Later he joined The Forgotten Rebels. He currently plays in Big Rude Jake's band Blue Mercury Coupe.

Brock Pytel plays guitar and fronts East Vancouver's SLIP~ons.

=== Reunion ===
Doughboys reunited briefly in the summer of 2011 as support for the Canadian leg of a Foo Fighters tour. No plans exist to extend the reunion beyond the tour or to create new music.

== Members ==
Former members
- John Kastner – rhythm guitar, lead vocals, backing vocals (1986–1997, 2011)
- Jonathan "Widdalee" Cummins – lead guitar, backing vocals, lead vocals (1987–1995, 2011)
- Paul Newman – drums (1989–1997, 2011)
- Jon "BondHead" Asencio – bass, backing vocals, lead vocals (1986–1991, 2011)
- Brock Pytel – drums, backing vocals, lead vocals (1986–1989, 2011)
- Peter Arsenault – bass, backing vocals, lead vocals (1992–1997)
- John DesLauriers – bass, backing vocals (1991–1992)
- Scott McCullough – lead guitar, backing vocals (1986–1987)
- Darren "Wiz" Brown – lead guitar, backing vocals (1996)
- Mark Arnold – lead guitar (1997)

Timeline

== Discography ==
Year	Title	Label	Peak chart positions	Certifications
Year	Title	Label	CAN	CAN
1987	Whatever	MTL Records		
1989	Home Again	Restless Records		
1990	Happy Accidents	Restless Records		
1993	Crush	A&M Records	63	Gold
1996	Turn Me On	A&M Records		

EPs

- When Up Turns to Down, (Restless Records/Emergo, 1991)
- Blanche, (A&M Records, 1993)
- La Majeure 1987, (Scamindy Records, Boss Tuneage Records, 2003)

Singles

- "Your Related"/"Stranger from Within"/"Forecast", 7", (No Label, 1988), (Promo, limited to 500 copies)
- "Home Again Live", 7", (Black Box Records, 1991)
- "Disposable", Single, (A&M Records, 1993)
- "Shine", Single, (A&M Records, 1993)
- "Shine", Maxi, (A&M Records, 1993)
- "Fix Me", Single, (A&M Records, 1993)
- "Neighbourhood Villain" (Crush, 1994)
- "I Never Liked You" (Turn Me On, 1996)
- "Everything and After" (Turn Me On, 1996)

Compilation albums

- More Than a State of Mind, (Restless Records, 1990) - features the track "I Won't Write You a Letter"
- Black Box Compilation, (Black Box Records, 1992) - features the track "Stole Yer Love" (live)
- Something's Gone Wrong Again: The Buzzcocks Covers Compilations, (C/Z Records, 1992) - features the track "Why She's a Girl from the Chainstore"
- A Tribute to Hard Core Logo, (BMG Music, 1996) - features the track "Something's Gonna Die Tonight"

Videos

- "Deep End" (1991)
- "Shine" (1993)
- "Fix Me" (1993)
- "Neighbourhood Villain" (1994)
- "I Never Liked You" (1996)
- "Everything and After" (1997).
