= Yeah, right =

Yeah, right may refer to:

- Yeah Right!, a skateboarding video
- Yeah Right! Records, an independent record label based in London, Ontario, Canada
- Yeah Right (Dionne Bromfield song)
- Yeah Right (Joji song)
- "Yeah, Right", a song by The Reverend Horton Heat from their 1994 album Liquor in the Front
- "Yeah Right", a song by Dinosaur Jr., from their 1994 album Without a Sound
- "Yeah Right", a song by Vince Staples from the album Big Fish Theory
