= Are You Normal? =

Studio album by Ned's Atomic Dustbin
- Released: 3 November 1992
- Genre: Alternative rock
- Length: 40:44
- Label: Columbia
- Producer: Andy Wallace

Ned's Atomic Dustbin chronology
God Fodder (1991)	Are You Normal? (1992)	Brainbloodvolume (1995)

Singles from Are You Normal?
- 1. "Not Sleeping Around" Released: 1992; 2. "Intact" Released: 1992

Professional ratings
Review scores
Source	Rating
Allmusic	3/5 stars

Are You Normal? is the second studio album by English rock band Ned's Atomic Dustbin, released on 3 November 1992 by Columbia Records. It features the band's biggest American hit "Not Sleeping Around", which hit the top of Billboard's Modern Rock Tracks chart.

== Music ==
Are You Normal? shows the band scaling back on the dual-bass, "punk-pop"-informed grebo sound of their debut album in order to "let the dynamics of the basses soak through the rush of power chords that dominate their early work." It also shows the band beginning to work with electronics, sampling and "ultramodern production" that the band would continue to explore in their later work. AllMusic said the result is "an almost bouncy, bright album, full of great hooks and lyrical cleverness."

== Track listing ==
1. "Suave And Suffocated"
2. "Walking Through Syrup"
3. "Legoland"
4. "Swallowing Air"
5. "Who Goes First?"
6. "Tantrum"
7. "Not Sleeping Around"
8. "You Don't Want To Do That"
9. "A Leg End in His Own Boots"
10. "Two And Two Made Five"
11. "Fracture"
12. "Spring"
13. "Intact"

== Personnel ==
- Matt Cheslin – bass
- Alex Griffin – bass, vocals
- Jonn Penney – vocals
- Rat – guitar, vocals
- Dan Warton – drums
- Andy Wallace – producer, mixing, engineer
- Steve Sisco – mixing assistant
- Darren Galer – assistant engineer
- Steve Gullick – photography, snaps
- Leigh Smiler – lyricist, lettering
- Helga – design

== Charts ==
Chart performance for Are You Normal?
Chart (1992–1993)	Peak position
Australian Albums (ARIA)	79
UK Albums (OCC)	13

== Samples ==
The song "Suave and Suffocated" contains a sample of a monologue by Dennis Hopper in the movie Apocalypse Now.
