= Tricky Woo =

Canadian garage punk band

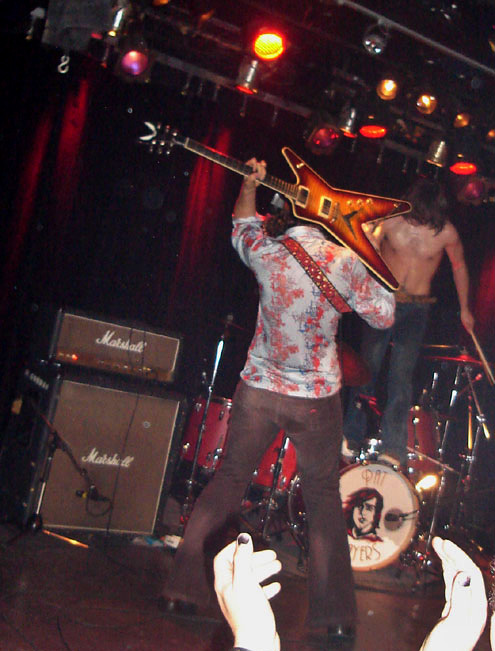
- Tricky Woo performing live in 2005

Background information
- Origin: Montreal, Quebec, Canada
- Genres: Garage punk, garage rock revival, hard rock
- Years active: 1996–2002, 2004–2005, 2009
- Labels: Sonic Unyon; Estrus; TeePee; SSG; Last Gang
- Past members: Andrew Dickson; Adrian Popovich; Alex Crowe; Patrick Sayers; Eric Larock; Patrick Conan; Phil Burns; Sasha Roiz; Jon Fazakerley

Tricky Woo was a Canadian garage punk band, based in Montreal. The "classic lineup" of the band consisted of vocalist and guitarist Andrew Dickson, guitarist Adrian Popovich, bass guitarist Eric Larock and drummer Patrick Conan. Tricky Woo released music on Sonic Unyon, Estrus Records, TeePee Records, Triple X Records, Mag Wheel, Yeah Right! Records, and Last Gang.

According to Julian Cope's Head Heritage site: "Unfortunately, the band became the victim of bad timing. They were doing pure unadulterated MC5/Stooges style rock a few years before the press in the U.K. gave attention to bands like The Datsuns and The Hives in the early 2000s."

== History ==
Originally formed in 1996 by Andrew Dickson, Sasha Roiz (drums), and Jon Fazakerley (bass), the band released their debut album Rock and Roll Music, Part 1 in 1997 on VICE Magazine's SSG Records. Adrian Popovich soon joined on second guitar and Eric Larock took over bass duties for their follow up album The Enemy is Real. Pat Conan replaced Roiz on the drums for the band's critically acclaimed third album Sometimes I Cry.

In 1999, the band performed in Toronto with Danko Jones and The New Meanies. Their 1999 album Sometimes I Cry was a nominee for Best Alternative Album at the Juno Awards of 2000. Their song "Easy" was featured in the Buffy the Vampire Slayer episode "The Zeppo".

After recording a self-titled EP, Popovich left the band in 2000, and the band released the more southern rock-oriented Les Sables Magiques in 2001 before breaking up in 2002. The band members subsequently participated in a new project, Soft Canyon, which also included former members of Local Rabbits.

Dickson, Popovich, and Larock reunited with new drummer Sayers in 2004 for a cross-Canada tour, and the band followed up with the NWOBHM-inspired album First Blush in 2005, with Alex Crowe replacing Larock who then joined Starvin Hungry. Tricky Woo was actively recording music through 2006, producing at least two songs, "Disenchanted Angel" and "Tighten the Noose", which would remain unreleased until 2015. "Tighten the Noose" would end up being the last song ever recorded by Tricky Woo, as the band entered a period of inactivity during which time Dickson formed the band Mongrels.

The Firsh Blush lineup consisting of Dickson, Popovich, Crowe, and Sayers reunited for two performances at Calgary's Sled Island music festival in 2009.

A compilation of b-sides and rarities titled The Children Of was released on yellow vinyl by Yeah Right! Records in 2015.

On September 27, 2018, "Sometimes I Cry" producer Ian Blurton tweeted, "Had a great time last night doing a "Behind The Music" style doc for Tricky Woo Sometimes I Cry reissue that's coming down the pipeline." sparking rumours that a reissue would be released in 2019, to commemorate the 20th anniversary of the record, however nothing surfaced.

In June 2020, a previously unreleased song titled "Who's Got The Bombs" was released on Yeah Right! Records' Black Lives Matter compilation. All proceeds from the release were donated to Black Lives Matter charities. "Who's Got The Bombs" is one of the earliest recorded Tricky Woo songs, dating back to their rare 1996 demo tape.

On August 31, 2021, a surprise announcement was made, that the bands first three albums, Rock and Roll Music, Part One, The Enemy is Real, and Sometimes I Cry were to be reissued on vinyl by Bonsound and Blow the Fuse, marking the first time their debut and sophomore albums would be issued on the format.

Several hours later, the trailer for the documentary Blurton had tweeted about in 2018 was released on YouTube. Along with Blurton, Sebastien Grainger and Jesse F. Keeler of the band Death From Above 1979 will appear in the film, as well as Billy Talent guitarist Ian D'Sa, Danko Jones, The Dears' Murray Lightburn, and George Stroumboulopoulos. Despite a promised release of October 2021, the film was not released until December 2025 (available on YouTube).

== Discography ==
- The Claw (1996, 7-inch EP, Mag Wheel Records)
- Rock and Roll Music, Part One (1997, CD, SSG Records)
- The Enemy is Real (1998, CD, Sonic Unyon Records)
- Ten Tons (1999, 7-inch EP, Grenadine Records)
- Sometimes I Cry (1999, CD, Sonic Unyon Records/LP No Tomorrow Records)
- Trouble/Rock & Roll Gypsy (2000, 7-inch, Estrus Records)
- Tricky Woo (2000, 10-inch EP, Mag Wheel Records)
- Les Sables Magiques (2001, CD, Sonic Unyon Records, TeePee Records)
- First Blush (2005, CD, Last Gang Records)
- The Children of Tricky Woo (2015, Vinyl, Yeah Right! Records)

== See also ==
- List of garage rock bands
