= Happy Accidents (album) =

Studio album by Doughboys
- Released: November 7, 1990
- Recorded: La Majeure, Montreal
- Genre: Pop-punk, Alternative rock,
- Length: 47:44
- Label: Restless Records
- Producer: Michael Phillip Wojewoda

Doughboys chronology
Home Again (1989)	Happy Accidents (1990)	Crush (Doughboys album) (1993)

Professional ratings
Review scores
Source	Rating
Allmusic	4/5 stars

Happy Accidents (1990) is the third album by Montreal pop-punk band Doughboys.

== Overview ==
Happy Accidents was released on Restless Records and was produced by Michael Phillip Wojewoda and engineered by David Sutton.

Happy Accidents was the band's first full release to feature drummer Paul Newman.

== Track listing ==
No.	Title	Writer(s)	Length
1.	"Countdown"	John Kastner	2:56
2.	"Sorry Wrong Number"	Kastner	3:17
3.	"Deep End"	Kastner	4:19
4.	"Intravenus De Milo"	Jon Cummins	4:07
5.	"Happy Home"	Kastner	2:26
6.	"Sunflower Honey"	John Bondhead	3:07
7.	"Far Away"	Cummins	4:41
8.	"Happy Sad Day"	Kastner	2:39
9.	"Wait And See"	Cummins	4:35
10.	"Every Bit Of Nothing"	Kastner	3:09
11.	"Dream Day"	Kastner	4:17
12.	"The Apprenticeship Of Lenny Kravitz"	Bondhead	4:30
13.	"Tupperware Party"	Cummins	3:55

== Personnel ==
- Vocals, Guitar - John Kastner, Jonathan Cummins
- Bass, Vocals - Jon Bondhead
- Drums - Paul Newman
- Engineer - Bryce Goggin
- Mastered By - David Sutton
- Mixed By - Ormond Jobin
- Producer - Michael Phillip Wojewoda
- Artwork By - Drazen Kozjan
