= Lovers in a Dangerous Time =

Single by Bruce Cockburn

from the album Stealing Fire
- Released: 1984
- Recorded: 1984
- Genre: Pop rock; new wave
- Length: 4:06
- Label: True North
- Songwriter: Bruce Cockburn
- Producers: Jon Goldsmith; Kerry Crawford

"Lovers in a Dangerous Time" is a song by Bruce Cockburn, originally released on his 1984 album Stealing Fire.

"Lovers in a Dangerous Time" was released as the first single from Stealing Fire. The song was a top 40 hit for Cockburn, peaking at No. 25 on the Canadian charts the week of August 18, 1984.

== Background ==
Cockburn has provided multiple explanations on the song's origins. He said that it inspired by seeing teenagers expressing romantic love in a schoolyard. Cockburn said in a 2010 interview with The Globe and Mail that he wrote the song while thinking about the dangers in the world, explaining that "when I wrote that, I was thinking of kids my daughter's age. She was quite young at the time. But, for any given individual, the world has always been a place where you could die."

In the song, Cockburn contrasts the hopefulness and joy of new love with the despair of a wider Cold War world where notions of the future often carried a sense of foreboding and doom. In light of Cockburn's next single "If I Had a Rocket Launcher", the song has also been interpreted by listeners and critics as referring to the same Guatemalan refugee crisis that inspired the later song, or to the then-emerging HIV/AIDS crisis. Cockburn stated in later interviews that he was pleased by both of these alternate interpretations.

In a 2021 interview, Cockburn commented that the song had additional salience during the COVID-19 pandemic, saying that it was "too appropriate to these circumstances we find ourselves in."

U2 alluded to "Lovers in a Dangerous Time" in their 1988 single "God Part II", with the lyric "Heard a singer on the radio late last night/He says he's gonna kick the darkness 'til it bleeds daylight."

== Critical reception ==
Billboard referred to "Lovers in a Dangerous Time" as a "moody but danceable track." Trouser Press highlighted "Lovers in a Dangerous Time" as "one of Cockburn’s best songs." Writing for AllMusic, Brett Hartenbach called it a "terse rocker" that "conveys both a sense of urgency and uncertainty."

In 2005, "Lovers" was named the 11th greatest Canadian song of all time on the CBC Radio One series 50 Tracks.

== Chart performance ==
Chart (1984)	Peak position
Canada Top Singles (RPM)	25
Canada Adult Contemporary (RPM)	8
US Mainstream Rock (Billboard)	56

== Covers ==
"Lovers in a Dangerous Time" was covered by Dan Fogelberg on his album The Wild Places, which was released in August 1990 by Epic Records.

The song was subsequently covered by Barenaked Ladies on the 1991 Cockburn tribute album Kick at the Darkness. Released as their debut single, it became their first top 40 hit on the Canadian charts, reaching No. 16 the week of February 15, 1992. It also appeared on their greatest hits compilation Disc One: All Their Greatest Hits (1991–2001).

Cockburn learned that Barenaked Ladies were covering "Lovers in a Dangerous Time" from Bernie Finkelstein, who informed him that there was a record label planning a Bruce Cockburn tribute album from emerging musicians in Toronto. When Cockburn first heard the Barenaked Ladies cover of "Lovers in a Dangerous Time", he was surprised by their approach to the song.

I was a bit shocked by how different the Ladies' treatment of the song was musically from how I had conceived of it. It took a bit of getting used to. Once I got over that, I was glad that they had taken their own distinctive road with it. It was fresh and interesting.

Cockburn has performed the song live with Barenaked Ladies several times under both arrangements. The band also recorded a version of "Lovers in a Dangerous Time" in 2020 during the COVID-19 pandemic.

== See also ==
- Lovers in a Dangerous Spacetime
