= The Besnard Lakes Are the Roaring Night =

Studio album by the Besnard Lakes
- Released: March 9, 2010
- Recorded: Breakglass (Montreal, Canada)
- Genre: Post-rock, psychedelic rock, indie rock, shoegaze
- Length: 46:31
- Label: Jagjaguwar (U.S.); Outside Music (Canada)
- Producer: Jace Lasek

The Besnard Lakes chronology
The Besnard Lakes Are the Dark Horse (2007)	The Besnard Lakes Are the Roaring Night (2010)	Until in Excess, Imperceptible UFO (2013)

The Besnard Lakes Are the Roaring Night is the third studio album by the Canadian rock band the Besnard Lakes, released in North America on March 9, 2010. The lead single, "Albatross", was released as a 12-inch single on February 9, 2010.

The band describe the album as "psychedelic rock – each song is its own little world, an atmosphere. I've always been enamored with these songs that take forever to get going, long songs that build, with a story and a long build to a climax." Thematically, the album continues their lyrical style of combining fictional and true stories. Main songwriters Jace Lasek and Olga Goreas have different thematical approaches to their songwriting on the album. Lasek's songs usually revolve around a retired spy who worked during the war and is now a lousy musician, while Goreas' songs are more inspired by her personal experiences.

The album was tracked and recorded at the band's own studio, Breakglass Studio, using a 1968 Neve germanium mixing console rumoured to have been used to record portions of Led Zeppelin's Physical Graffiti, and introduces some new instrumentation for the band: 12 string guitar, flute, omnichord, and mellotron.

The album was a shortlisted nominee for the 2010 Polaris Music Prize.

== Track listing ==
No.	Title	Length
1.	"Like the Ocean, Like the Innocent Pt. 1: The Ocean"	1:39
2.	"Like the Ocean, Like the Innocent Pt. 2: The Innocent"	7:17
3.	"Chicago Train"	5:18
4.	"Albatross"	4:42
5.	"Glass Printer"	3:54
6.	"Land of Living Skies Pt. 1: The Land"	1:05
7.	"Land of Living Skies Pt. 2: The Living Skies"	5:42
8.	"And This Is What We Call Progress"	5:10
9.	"Light Up the Night"	7:25
10.	"The Lonely Moan"	4:19
Total length:		46:31

Professional ratings
Review scores
Source	Rating
AllMusic	3.5/5 stars
BBC	(positive)
Delusions of Adequacy	(positive)
Drowned in Sound	8/10 stars
musicOMH	4/5 stars
NME	9/10 stars
No Ripcord	8/10 stars
One Thirty BPM	(86%)
Pitchfork	(7.8/10)
Rolling Stone	3.5/5 stars
Slant Magazine	4/5 stars
Spin Magazine	3.5/5 stars
Tiny Mix Tapes	3.5/5 marks

== Personnel ==
The Besnard Lakes

- Olga Goreas – vocals (1–7, 9, 10), bass (1–5, 8, 9), drums (1, 2), backwards guitar (4), bass pedals (6, 7), Mellotron (9), Hammond organ (10), Juno 60 synthesizer (10)
- Jace Lasek – vocals (1–9), guitars (1–10), piano (1, 2), Hammond organ (1, 2, 3, 8, 9), Juno 60 synthesizer (1, 2, 6, 7), Fender Rhodes (3), EBow (6, 7, 8), drums (6, 7, 8), tambourine (8), piano (9), Mellotron (9), bass (10), space echo (10)
- Kevin Laing – drums (1–5, 8, 9), percussion (9)
- Richard White – guitars (1–7, 9), EBow (1, 2, 3, 10), string arrangements (3)

Additional musicians

- Shiela Lasek – Hammond organ (1, 2)
- Monica Guenter – vocals (3)
- Chris Seligman – French horns (3)
- Murray Lightburn – Omnichord synthesizer (10)

Production

- Jace Lasek – producer, recording engineer, mixing
- Olga Goreas – producer
- Harris Newman – mastering
- Corri-Lynn Tetz – cover painting
- Todd Stewart – illustration
- Daniel Murphy – design
