= Brainbloodvolume =

Studio album by Ned's Atomic Dustbin
- Released: 21 March 1995
- Genre: Alternative rock
- Length: 38:39
- Label: Furtive, Columbia
- Producer: Tim Palmer

Ned's Atomic Dustbin chronology
Are You Normal? (1992)	Brainbloodvolume (1995)

Singles from Brainbloodvolume
- 1. "All I Ask of Myself Is That I Hold Together" Released: 13 March 1995; 2. "Stuck" Released: 3 July 1995

Brainbloodvolume is the third and final album from English rock band Ned's Atomic Dustbin with their original line-up. It was released in the United States on 21 March 1995 but did not appear in the United Kingdom until July of that year.

== Music ==
Brainbloodvolume finds the band "decisively stepping beyond" their usual style "to embrace a variety of styles and approaches," and is marked by "ultramodern production", electronics and sampling, all of which were introduced to a lesser extent on Are You Normal? Ned Raggett of Allmusic said the album was "brimming with energy and a willingness to experiment" while "retaining the yearning heart" of many early songs by the band. The album is "an altogether happier effort" than its predecessor and shows the band seeming "confident and relaxed enough to work; the songs appear to be the result of actual woodshedding, not last-minute whip-ups."

Palmer's "especially careful" production "gets [the material] all down in a clear mix of bristling, textured power and slick commercial" whilst ably following "the group's minor stylistic perambulations while juggling modern dance beats, driving rock, pinging atmospherics, found-sound silliness and glossy mid-tempo pop." Guitarist Rat and sometimes bassist Alex Griffin indulge "in crispier sometimes-abstract performances that suggest early-'80s post-punk à la New Order and the Cure."

According to Raggett, opening song "All I Ask of Myself Is That I Hold Together" features an "absolutely massive guitar blast and partially sampled metallic percussion" with "John Penney's always-reliable vocals riding the chaos with increasing desperation, serves notice that the quintet isn't into doing anything half-assed." "Floote" is another instance "of the band's ear for newer approaches", and features a flute and "an attractive sitar filigree for a trippily eerie crunch." According to Trouser Press, the song is witty "pop-hop" and its flute is "jammy." "Your Only Joke" and "I Want It Over" are together an "epic but not overbearing collapse." "Premonition" features the Funky Drummer breakbeat loop sped-up, acoustic guitar and "a quietly hyperactive keyboard techno riff." "...To Be Right" combines "heavily processed wash" with "gentler chime."

== Album title ==
The album title is named after a medical theory concerning increasing brain blood volume in order to enlarge awareness in sensitivity and empathy; in an interview with James Bonisteel, the band described the album title: "Well, there's a certain school of theory—a medical theory—that thinks if you increase the volume of blood in the brain that you can increase your awareness in your empathy and your sensitivity. There were some people in the 60's who tried to increase their brain blood volume by drilling a hole into the skull to crack sort of a pressure release. I don't know how crazy it is. People are trying to do that to themselves all the time, maybe not like that literally, but that's what people use drugs for and that's why people exercise—basically to release the pressure that's in them. I think it's something that everybody does in their own way; it's just that this is a particularly interesting way to relieve the pressures in your head."

== Reception ==
Professional ratings
Review scores
Source	Rating
Allmusic	4/5 stars

The staff of Melody Maker said "we asked Neil Kulkarni to review the new Ned's Atomic Dustbin LP. Instead, he's written one very long sentence, and one very short one. Well, you can't always get what you want. But if you try sometimes, you might get what you need."

Christopher Lloyd of Louder Than War retrospectively called the album "a solid piece of work." xsilence noted how, instead of transitioning into a Britpop band, as multiple "noisy groups" did at the time, Ned's Atomic Dustbin surprisingly took "the option to integrate electronic sounds into their scabby rock."

== Track listing ==
1. "All I Ask of Myself Is That I Hold Together" (4:17)
2. "Floote" (2:51)
3. "Premonition" (4:03)
4. "Talk Me Down" (3:31)
5. "Borehole" (3:25)
6. "Your Only Joke" (3:18)
7. "Stuck" (3:40)
8. "...To Be Right" (3:35)
9. "I Want It Over" (3:58)
10. "Traffic" (3:30)
11. "Song Eleven Could Take Forever" (4:00)

== Credits ==
- Alex – bass, electric guitar, keyboards, backing vocals
- Mat – bass, sampler
- Jonn Penney – vocals
- Rat – electric and acoustic guitar, keyboards, sampler
- D.C. Worton – drums, synthesizer, sampler
- Tim Palmer – producer
- Mark O'Donoughue – engineer

== Charts ==
Chart performance for Brainbloodvolume
Chart (1995)	Peak position
Australian Albums (ARIA)	128

== See also ==
- Bart Huges - a Dutch librarian published "The Mechanism of Brainbloodvolume ('BBV')" in 1964.
