= Starvin Hungry =

Canadian rock band

- Origin: Montreal, Quebec, Canada
- Genre: rock
- Years active: 1996–2009
- Labels: Grenadine Records, Signed by Force
- Past members: John Milchem, Glenn Milchem, Jon Card, Nick Sewell, Spencer Warren, Eric Larock, Scott Mucklow, Dave Lavoie
- Website: starvinhungry.bandcamp.com

Starvin Hungry was a Canadian rock band formed in Toronto and later based in Montreal, Quebec.

== History ==
Starvin Hungry was initially begun as a solo guitar and vocal act by John Milchem in 1995, performing original songs that drew inspiration from the Velvet Underground, Motörhead,'90s garage rock and early John Lee Hooker solo recordings. His twin brother Glenn, a local scene veteran and drummer for long-standing Canadian country-rock act Blue Rodeo, joined as a part-time member shortly after. In the years following Starvin Hungry alternated between a solo and duo live act in the Toronto bar scene, largely depending on Glenn's availability around Blue Rodeo's touring and recording schedule.

The eight-song 'raw like luv' cassette released in 1997 features the two-piece version of the band recorded live to 1/4" tape by Daryl Smith in a single afternoon session at Chemical Sound Studios in Toronto. Another 2-day recording session with Smith early the following year tracked twelve songs. This recording was never released, although 3 tracks from the session came out in 2002 as a demo CD sold at shows, and the session's only solo performance, "I Feel Free," appeared as a hidden track in 2004's "Damnesty". Both Chemical Sound recordings can be heard in their entirety at starvinhungry1995-2000.bandcamp.com. Glenn Milchem left the band in early 1998.

Starvin Hungry continued as a solo act until former SNFU and D.O.A. drummer Jon Card joined in late 1998. The band's final Toronto lineup was completed with the addition of Nick Sewell (Tchort, Illuminati, Biblical, Mount Cyanide) as its first bassist a few months later. This lineup's last show at Toronto's Bovine Sex Club in early 2000 was documented in another unreleased recording made by Kevin Drew and Charles Spearin of Broken Social Scene. John Milchem moved to Montreal shortly afterward.

After relocating to Montreal, Milchem recruited new member Spencer Warren on drums in 2001, adding Eric Larock on bass later that year and Scott Mucklow on guitar in 2002. Warren was formerly the drummer of Montreal punk bands Line Three and the Subumlauts, while Larock had previously played bass with Tricky Woo. Larock was later replaced by Dave Lavoie, formerly of Soft Canyon.

The band recorded its Damnesty album with Jonathan Cummins in 2003. The album was released on Grenadine Records and received positive media attention, charting on campus-community radio stations in Canada. The band toured Canada in support of the album which was described as "...no-frills rock at maximum volume... loaded with strong songwriting, catchy hooks and tight playing".

In 2007, Starvin Hungry released their follow up Cold Burns album on Ramachandra Borcar (DJ Ram)'s Signed by Force label. The album was recorded by Jace Lasek and received sustained critical acclaim, hailed by Now Magazine as "loud, brash and full of fire". The band toured the U.S. and Canada in support of the album.

In 2008, Mucklow left the band, and Starvin Hungry continued as a three-piece until Dave Lavoie's departure in 2009, which Milchem took as a cue to end Starvin Hungry's activity as a band. Dave Lavoie died of colon cancer February 6, 2021.

In addition to playing in Starvin Hungry, its members contributed to other musical acts. In 2012, Mucklow founded the band Half Measures which Warren and Lavoie later joined. Mucklow later played guitar with garage rock act Slippery Hitch whose self-titled debut ep was released in 2020. Warren has played drums as part of other acts including Krista Muir and Lederhosen Lucil and contributed drums to Shane Watt's 2007 release Elan's Diner. From 2006-2012, Milchem played drums for the O-Voids; a compilation of their various releases was put out by the Sounds Escaping label. Milchem currently plays drums in support of Montreal-based multi-instrumentalist Eliza Kavtion and in a new as-yet unnamed project with former Doughboys member and Bionic founder Jonathan Cummins.

== Discography ==
=== Full-length albums ===
- 1997: raw like luv
- 2004: Damnesty (Grenadine Records)
- 2007: Cold Burns (Signed by Force)

=== EPs ===
- 2002: Starvin Hungry
