= UnPop Montreal =

Music festival in Quebec, Canada

UnPop Montreal was a music festival in Montreal, Quebec, Canada. The festival typically occurs at the end of August or early September. UnPop Montreal started as a weekend long event featuring unknown bands. It has since grown into a two-week party known for hosting free live shows featuring some of Montreal's best-known underground bands - and a few underdogs.

The name of the festival was inspired in reaction to Pop Montreal.

== Founding ==
The first festival was in 2005, born from a rant in the local alternative weekly, The Montreal Mirror by Nathan Munn. Munn took issue with the common practice by other festivals (i.e. Pop Montreal and NXNE) of charging application fees to bands. He felt that many unknown or unpopular acts would be overlooked by the festival's selection committees. He charged bias selection practices favoring friends and well established acts over local talent. Those local acts that were selected, were often paired with larger acts as openers for shows with steep ticket prices (why this is problematic should be clarified).

In reaction to these practices, Munn founded the UnPop festival. The festival's mandate includes a first-come, first-served application process with no fee. Further, the events are free of charge and open to the public.

== History ==
In 2005, Munn and a few friends started contacting venues and plead online and in local weekly papers for bands to apply. Meanwhile, Munn's collaborator Sébastian Hell obtained corporate sponsorship from local microbreweries and small businesses. However, the festival came at an enormous out-of-pocket cost to both organizers.

With mounting costs, the 2006 festival was nearly cancelled. Fortunately, Pop Montreal founder, Daniel Seligman intervened, providing the festival with an outdoor stage for one day during Pop Montreal.

In 2007, Munn left UnPop. Total control of the festival was given to Sebastian Hell. The third edition of the festival is known as its most successful. However, once again, Hell was left with outrageous out-of-pocket expenses.

The 2008 festival was a scaled back version that took place in December. The change of date was to determine whether the festival's draw would increase if it did not compete directly with Pop Montreal. However, the festival was not nearly as successful as in previous year.

In 2009, the festival coincide with Pop Montreal in its entirety. This was perhaps the festival's most aggressive rendition, lasting an entire 3 months (Aug-Oct).

== Venues And Performers ==
=== 2005 ===
Thursday, August 25 to Sunday, August 28.

Venues: Green Room, Main Hall, Pharmacie Esperanza, L'Hémisphère Gauche and Les Foufounes Électriques.

Performers: Raw Madonna, Michael Seta, Gyroscope, Ghettonuns, John School Dropouts, Sébastian Hell/Blooze Konekshun, Uncle Daddy, Deadbush, Channel 2, Boeufs De Matane, Argon Floozy, Dress Whites, French Leaves, Infinite Moksha, The Real Deal, Pelvic Thrust and Squalor.

=== 2006 ===
Performers: 12, Raw Madonna and Launie Anderssohn

=== 2007 ===
In 2007, Sébastian Hell brought a new vision to the festival and ended up hosting 45 bands for 10 shows in 7 different venues over 2 weeks. Over 1100 spectators came to the concerts, though that figure hides near-empty shows. All shows had planned a 12:30 AM end time so that spectators could also travel using the city's subway and public transit home and save on cab fare, as well as on admission price. This expansion is said to be the first part of a larger-scale plan, although said plans were never made public.

Venues: Zoobizarre, Playhouse, Quai Des Brumes, Barfly, L'Absynthe, Cagibi, and Lola Lounge.

Performers: Croc Mort, God: Zero, Les Vestons, The Unsettlers, The Jimmy Riggers, Me & Mary Jane (twice), Richard Carr, Sébastian Hell, Nightwood, Plunt, Infinite Moksha, Raw Madonna, The Sacramentos, Pax Nipponica, Shane Watt, members of Ideal Lovers, UnPop All Stars, Launie Anderssohn, Belleisle, Dush, Will Austin Escape, Les Jazz Bin, OK Giraffe, Allan Lento, Elizabeth Bruce, Shot While Hunting, On Bodies, Eleveneighty, Devil Eyes, Dead Messenger, Meltdown Club, Doc Pickles, Black Mammoth, Argon Floozy, .cut & Friends, Anti-School-Year, Les Tristes Tropiques.

=== 2008 ===
Because of logistic issues mostly, Sébastian Hell decided that 2008's edition was to feature no more than 3 acts per show, with clear headliners who will have a longer allotted time slot.

2008's edition occurred over four days in early December, split into two venues. December 4 was at Cagibi and featured Sébastian Hell, Might, Reason To Hide and Anti-School-Year; December 5 and 6 were at The Pound, with the Friday show Raw Madonna, The Montreal Nintendo Orkestar, Launie Anderssohn and Merles Guitar Band, while the Saturday show had The Nevers, ElevenEighty and Smoked Meat Fax Machine. December 7 was back at Cagibi with Patrick Hutchinson (of Swift Years), Will Austin, Allan Lento and Elizabeth Bruce.

=== 2009 ===
2009's edition took place from August 21 to October 23, often letting a complete week in between shows. It was launched with an afternoon show at record store SoundCentral on August 21, featuring solo sets from Small Wars and Sébastian Hell, followed by a couple of shows at Quai Des Brumes on August 26 (Jade Malek, Anti-School-Year, and Video Nasties) and September 8 (A Devil's Din, Low End Ensemble, Technical Kidman and Natalie Portland) and a Cagibi singer-songwriter night (Allan Lento, Philémon Chante, Simon Schreiber and a surprise mini-set by Hell).

As a tribute to years past, 2006 specifically, UnPop also held a spot on the outdoors scene usually reserved to Pop Montreal during the St-Laurent street sale on Friday, August 28. UnPop veterans Dead Messenger and Sébastian Hell played, as well as first-timers Le Mon@de, Plajia, After The Weather and (The) Slowest Runner (in all the World).

=== 2010 ===
The 2010 edition took place from August 26 to September 23, with an average of one show per week. It started with a spot at Parc Des Amériques during the St-Laurent street sale on Thursday, August 26, with 6 one-hour slots from 4PM to 10PM; Richard Lahmy, sskkLLFFkk, The Lindbergh Line, Desert Owls, Dead Messenger and Allan Lento & Will Austin performed, with the last duo getting fined for excessive noise, which garnered much media exposure, considering they played an unplugged acoustic set.

=== 2012 and 2013 ===
Mostly held in small venues such as Le Cagibi, Le Pastel and L'Escalier, as well as 'semi-private' loft parties, the 2012 and 2013 editions took place in November of their respective years and featured past UnPop alumni such as Will Austin, Patrick Hutchinson, and Allan Lento, and newcomers such as Les Vestiges and Les Guenilles, and a Lame De Fer reunion featuring Sébastian Hell.

== Notable Poster Artists ==
- Edmund Lam
- Sébastian Hell
- Nick Kuepfer
- James Ryan Halpenny
- Trebek
- Eleveneighty
- Lillywave
- Yan Basque
- Autodestrukt
