= Bionic (band) =

Canadian alternative rock band

- Origin: Montreal, Quebec, Canada
- Genres: alternative rock
- Years active: 1998-2007
- Labels: Sound King Records, Squirtgun Records, Cargo Records, Signed by Force Records
- Members: Jonathan Cummins; Ian Blurton; Sammy Goldberg; Alexander McSween; Tim Dwyer; Paul Julius

Bionic was a Canadian alternative rock band, active from 1998 to 2007.

The group was formed by Jonathan Cummins following the breakup of Doughboys. The original lineup was Cummins on guitar, Sammy 'Bodega' Goldberg on bass and Alex McSween on drums. In 1998, they released the album Bionic. Cargo Records reissued this album in Europe in 2001.

McSween and Goldberg left the band and were replaced by bassist Paul Julius and drummer Tim Dwyer. They were also joined by Ian Blurton and, in 2002, released the album Deliverance. They supported the album with extensive touring of both North America and Europe.

The band released its third and final album, Black Blood, in 2007.

== Discography ==
Albums

- Bionic (1998), Sound King Records, Squirtgun Records
- Deliverance (2002), Sound King Records
- Black Blood (2007), Signed by Force Records

Splits

- HomeBoys Versus Bionic (2000), Diabolik Records
- Squalor/Bionic (2004), Pirates Records, Contempt For Humanity Records
