= Jellyfishbabies =

Canadian alternative rock band

Jellyfish babies
- Origin: Halifax, Nova Scotia, Canada
- Genres: Alternative rock
- Years active: 1986–1993
- Past members: Scott Kendall; Peter Arsenault; Dave Schellenberg; Colleen Britton; Mike Belitsky

Jellyfishbabies were an alternative rock band in Canada, active from 1986 to 1993. Although the band never attained mainstream success, they were one of the major influences on the "Halifax Pop Explosion" scene of the early 1990s.

Originally from Halifax, Nova Scotia, the band consisted of vocalist Scott Kendall, guitarist Peter Arsenault, bassist Dave Schellenberg and drummer Colleen Britton. The original lineup released an independent self-titled album in 1986, which hit No. 1 on local radio station CKDU-FM just three days after its release.

The band was featured on Out of the Fog, a 1986 compilation of Halifax-area bands which was also credited with launching the career of Sarah McLachlan.

By 1987, the band had decided to move to Toronto in hopes of landing a recording contract. Britton declined to make the move, however, and was replaced by Mike Belitsky.

Once in Toronto, the band released the album The Unkind Truth About Rome in 1990. Their single, "The Erlking", was featured on the Highway 61 soundtrack, and the band recorded a cover of "Call it Democracy" for the Bruce Cockburn tribute album, Kick at the Darkness. They followed up with The Swan and the City in 1992, although Arsenault had by this time left the band to join the Doughboys. However, the band had limited commercial success, and broke up sometime following The Swan and the City.

Sloan named their 2003 album Action Pact for the Jellyfishbabies song "Youth Action Pact".

== Discography ==
=== Albums ===
- Jellyfishbabies (1986)
- The Unkind Truth About Rome (1990)
- The Swan and the City (1993)

=== Compilations ===
- Out of the Fog (1986)
- Highway 61 (1991)
- Kick at the Darkness (1991)

== See also ==
- Music of Canada
