= Kick at the Darkness =

Compilation album by Various artists
- Released: 1991
- Genre: Pop, rock, folk
- Label: Intrepid

Professional ratings
Review scores
Source	Rating
AllMusic	2.5/5 stars

Kick at the Darkness is a tribute album to Canadian singer-songwriter Bruce Cockburn, released in 1991. The title comes from a line in the song "Lovers in a Dangerous Time": "gotta kick at the darkness 'til it bleeds daylight". The album was released on Intrepid Records.

The Barenaked Ladies' rendition of "Lovers in a Dangerous Time" was their first significant chart hit in Canada, reaching No. 16 the week of 15 February 1992.

== Track listing ==
1. "Lovers in a Dangerous Time" – Barenaked Ladies
2. "A Long Time Love Song" – Martin Tielli and Jane Siberry
3. "Lord of the Starfields" – Swing Gang
4. "Feet Fall on the Road" – Five Guys Named Moe
5. "Silver Wheels" – All Her Brothers are Drummers
6. "All the Diamonds in the World" – Rebecca Jenkins
7. "Wondering Where the Lions Are" – B-Funn
8. "Stolen Land" – Chris Bottomley
9. "Waiting for the Moon" – Fat Man Waving
10. "If I Had a Rocket Launcher" – Cottage Industry
11. "Call it Democracy" – Jellyfishbabies
12. "One Day I Walk" – Skydiggers
13. "Red Ships Take Off in the Distance" – Bob Wiseman
