= Tranzophobia =

Studio album by Mega City Four
- Released: 1989
- Genre: Pop, punk-pop
- Label: Decoy
- Producer: Iain Burgess

Mega City Four chronology
Tranzophobia (1989)	Who Cares Wins (1990)

Tranzophobia is the debut album by the English band Mega City Four, released in 1989. Its title was inspired by the band's Ford Transit van. The album was produced by Iain Burgess and released by Decoy Records.

Mega City Four supported the album with a British tour. Tranzophobia was an independent album chart success.

== Critical reception ==
Professional ratings
Review scores
Source	Rating
AllMusic	3/5 stars
Los Angeles Times	3/5 stars
MusicHound Rock: The Essential Album Guide	3/5 stars

The Los Angeles Times praised "the joyfully adolescent attitude," writing that "the tuneful rush of early Buzzcocks and Undertones lives on." Trouser Press concluded that the production "is way too muddy, and the band's chunky sound is a little rag-tag sloppy in places, but the hooks are so ringing and the lyrics so first-rate, that, like the early Descendents, the record overcomes such troubles." NME deemed the tracks "the most addictive pop songs created over the past year." Best listed Tranzophobia as the fourth best album of 1989.

AllMusic wrote that "the songs charge forth with fuzzy, rapidly chorded guitars; the upbeat vocals are buttressed by anthemic harmonies, and the lyrics are the thoughts of young men searching for ways to solidify their identity while maintaining integrity." The Guardian called Tranzophobia a "classic first album."

== Track listing ==
All lyrics were written by Wiz, and all music was composed by M.C.4.

1. "Start"
2. "Pride and Prejudice"
3. "Severe Attack of the Truth"
4. "Paper Tiger"
5. "January"
6. "Twenty One Again"
7. "On Another Planet"
8. "Things I Never Said"
9. "New Year's Day"
10. "Occupation"
11. "Alternative Arrangements"
12. "Promise"
13. "What You've Got"
14. "Stupid Way to Die"
