= Sébastian Hell =

Canadian singer (born 1978)

Sébastian Hell (born September 14, 1978) is a Canadian musician, songwriter and screenwriter who is also the manager of the UnPop Montreal. He fronts a band called Sébastian Hell/Blooze Konekshun and also performs solo. In June 2020, he released an album titled A Reflection On Police Brutality (Vol. 1).
