= Gig Records =

Coordinates: 40.08292°N 74.08055°W

- Industry: Music & entertainment
- Genre: Rock, Punk, Singer/Songwriter, Electronic
- Founded: 1998
- Headquarters: Point Pleasant, New Jersey, United States
- Key people: Indian; David Smith; Ovid Battat; Gorgo
- Products: Music & entertainment
- Website: gigrecords.com

Gig Records is an independent US record label founded in 1998 that operates out of Point Pleasant, New Jersey. Composed mostly of rock bands, Gig Records' roster also includes electronic artists, singer/songwriters, punk bands, and a movie soundtrack. The label's most notable acts are: Miles Hunt of The Wonderstuff, Ned's Atomic Dustbin, Blind Society, and The Vibrators.

== History ==
In 1998, label President and co-founder Indian left TVT Records, then the largest independent US record label, to pursue his own label. After working in multiple facets of the music industry for more than a decade, Indian recruited partners David Smith, Ovid Battat, and Gorgo to form Gig Records.

Gig Records adopted the slogan "Doing Things Differently", and still operates on this principle. Implementing creative tactics to help drive artists to success is at the forefront of the Gig Records mantra, running closely with the intent to work for the artist instead of the artist working for the label. This unorthodox methodology of operation has helped Gig Records earn notoriety over the years as a label that nurtures and develops new and exciting artists.

Eat

== Artists ==
- Amazing Meet Project
- Blind Society
- Dead 50's
- Dryer
- Eat Eat (band)
- Fight Of Your Life
- Great Mutant Skywheel
- Groundswell UK
- Gum Parker
- Love In Reverse
- Michael Ferentino
- Miles Hunt
- Misty Murphy
- Nebula 9
- Ned's Atomic Dustbin
- Pure 13
- Red Engine Nine
- Shamra
- Stephen Reso
- Sunday All Stars
- The Vibrators
- Virginia
- Weak At Best
- The Youth Ahead

== Soundtracks ==
- A Better Place
