= Sebastopol Rd. =

Studio album by Mega City Four
- Released: 1992
- Studio: Greenhouse
- Label: Big Life; Caroline
- Producer: Jessica Corcoran

Mega City Four chronology
Terribly Sorry Bob (1991)	Sebastopol Rd. (1992)	Inspiringly Titled (1992)

Sebastopol Rd. is an album by the English band Mega City Four, released in 1992. It was the band's only album to be released in the United States; they supported it with a North American tour. The album was reissued in 2013 with a Peel session, among other bonus tracks.

The album peaked at No. 41 on the UK Albums Chart.

== Production ==
Produced by Jessica Corcoran, Sebastopol Rd. was recorded at Greenhouse Studios, in England. It was named after the band's rehearsal space.

== Critical reception ==
Professional ratings
Review scores
Source	Rating
AllMusic	3/5 stars
The Encyclopedia of Popular Music	4/5 stars
MusicHound Rock: The Essential Album Guide	4.5/5 stars
Record Collector	3/5 stars
Martin C. Strong	6/10

Trouser Press wrote that "acoustic strums ... abound, over which the singer vents optimism, experience and, most of all, poignant disillusionment ... A rough-edged pop classic." The Washington Post called the album "likable, unpretentious stuff, less stylized than is typical of most young British bands," writing that it "offers 12 bristling but tuneful songs, economical mid-tempo rockers that balance Danny Brown's and Wiz's tart guitars with the quartet's semi-sweet backing vocals." The Gazette opined that "punk energy begets melodic hooks as Mega City Four grows up a bit."

== Legacy ==
AllMusic noted: "Heard from ten years' distance, Sebastopol Rd. is at once comfortably obvious and weirdly prescient. While Wiz's high, impassioned vocals weren't emo per se—and he was always careful to sing rather than scream—there's a weird way in how the 12 songs almost predict the future without trying to." MusicHound Rock: The Essential Album Guide labeled the album "a tense, taut, pop mini-masterpiece." In 2013, Record Collector deemed it "an indie-pop gem with punk overtones." The Rough Guide to Rock considered it "one of the 90s catchiest (pre-Britpop) discs."

== Track listing ==
No.	Title	Length
1.	"Ticket Collector"
2.	"Scared of Cats"
3.	"Callous"
4.	"Peripheral"
5.	"Anne Bancroft"
6.	"Prague"
7.	"Clown"
8.	"Props"
9.	"What's Up"
10.	"Vague"
11.	"Stop"
12.	"Wasting My Breath"
