= Ned's Atomic Dustbin =

English rock band

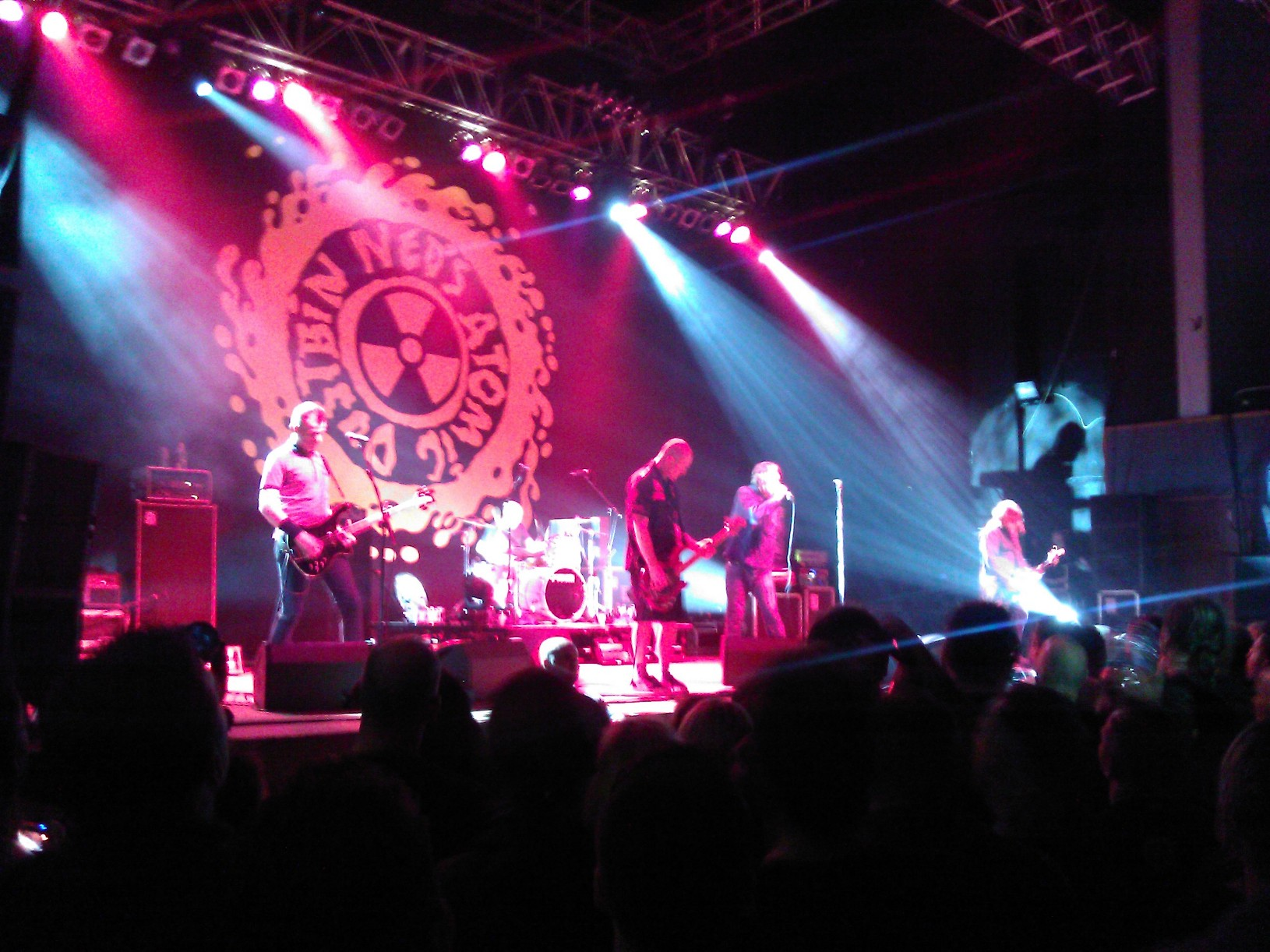
- Ned's Atomic Dustbin performing at Wolverhampton's Wulfrun Hall, December 2012. Left to right: Alex Griffin, Dan Worton, Matt Cheslin, Jonn Penney, Rat

Background information
- Origin: Stourbridge, England
- Genres: Alternative rock, power pop, grebo, indie punk
- Years active: 1987–1995; 2000–present
- Labels: Furtive; Sony; Columbia; Spitfirepink
- Members: Jonn Penney; Alex Griffin; Dan Worton; Gareth "Rat" Pring; Matt Cheslin
- Past members: Andy King; Martin Warlow; Wiz
- Website: www.nedsatomicdustbin.com

Ned's Atomic Dustbin is an English rock band formed in Stourbridge, West Midlands, in November 1987. The band took their name from an episode of radio comedy programme The Goon Show. The band is unusual for using two bass-players in their line-up.

They have been cited as an influence by Cap'n Jazz and Blink-182.

== History ==
Frontman and co-founder Jonn Penney has listed Joni Mitchell, Echo & the Bunnymen, The Cure and The Teardrop Explodes among his favourite artists. His favourite albums include Closing Time by Tom Waits and Architecture & Morality by Orchestral Manoeuvres in the Dark. Ned's Atomic Dustbin quickly gathered a strong fanbase after being offered a support slot by local heroes The Wonder Stuff on their 1989 and 1990 UK tours. During 1990, Ned's Atomic Dustbin signed with Birmingham-based indie label Chapter 22 Records for their debut release, The Ingredients EP, followed by a single, "Kill Your Television", which reached No. 92 and No. 53 respectively in the UK singles chart. "Kill Your Television" also topped the UK independent singles chart. This, combined with their acclaimed live reputation, drew a huge crowd to their afternoon appearance on the main stage of the Reading Festival in August 1990. The buzz created was significant enough to catalyse the interest of major record labels. One final single for Chapter 22 followed, "Until You Find Out" which eventually stalled at No. 51. The band decided to sign to Sony Records, on the proviso that they be allowed to release their music through their own Furtive label – thus regaining a higher degree of creative control while still enjoying the benefit of the major label's distribution and advertising clout.

In March 1991, Ned's Atomic Dustbin found themselves in the UK top 20 with their next single, "Happy", their Sony/Furtive debut. It reached No. 16 and earned the band the first of two Top of the Pops appearances. They released their debut album God Fodder shortly afterwards, in April 1991, which made No. 4 in the UK albums chart. In July 1991, British music magazine NME noted that the band were, along with The KLF, Seal, The La's and Electronic, making their mark in the United States. The band released a new UK single, "Trust", towards the end of 1991, while America got the God Fodder versions of "Kill Your Television" and "Grey Cell Green", the video for the latter track proving to be a big hit on MTV's taste-making alternative show 120 Minutes. During 1991, the group toured around the world with, amongst others, Mega City Four, Senseless Things and Jesus Jones. They recorded their second album Are You Normal? in 1992, which was promoted by the singles "Not Sleeping Around", "Intact" and, in some European territories, "Walking Through Syrup".

Having headlined the NME stage at the Glastonbury Festival in 1992, the band spent the next couple of years on a worldwide tour, releasing a compilation of older non-album material and two new tracks called "0.522" in 1994 before decamping to Wales to record their final album, Brainbloodvolume. While still retaining the band's trademark melodic sensibilities, this album boasted a heavier, more diverse sound than their previous releases, moving away from the distinctive twin bass set-up to incorporate samplers and keyboards. Sony released the album in America before the UK, meaning that most die-hard fans bought it on import. This damaged its UK chart position when it was eventually released domestically, increasing tensions between the band and their label.

Ned's Atomic Dustbin had one last UK top 40 single with "All I Ask of Myself Is That I Hold Together" in 1995, following a final appearance on The Word, while the uncharacteristically slow number, "Stuck", became the band's final single, making the BBC Radio One B-list. In 1995, after an extensive US tour to support Brainbloodvolume, Ned's Atomic Dustbin split up in New York City following what would be their final show.

Singer Penney formed a new band, Groundswell (initially featuring Ned's Atomic Dustbin guitarist, Rat), who recorded one single, "Corrode", and a studio album Plausible/Infeasible for New Jersey–based indie label, Gig Records. They disbanded shortly thereafter – in fact, the album was only actually released after their demise.

Ned's Atomic Dustbin took the stage in 2000 for the first time since their initial breakup for a show in Dudley with Groundswell members Andy King and Martin Warlow taking the place of Mat Cheslin and Rat. Originally billed as "the last 30 minutes of Ned's Atomic Dustbin," it was intended as an opportunity to say a proper goodbye to British fans who never got to see a final Ned's show. However, the resounding success convinced members of the band to continue working together, and they continue to perform sporadically ever since. 2004 saw the band perform two new songs, "Hibernation" and "Ambush". In 2005 they again played a few late-December gigs, and on 5 June 2006 their first new single in 11 years, "Hibernation", was released, supported with a weekend concert series called "Ned-Fest". The single was available as both a download and a CD, available to buy online via their website.

The video game NCAA Football 2006 for PlayStation 2 and Xbox features the song "Kill Your Television". Their song "Grey Cell Green" is featured in the video game Saints Row for the Xbox 360 platform, on "The Rock" radio station. The Neds' cover version of the Bay City Rollers song "Saturday Night" features in the movie So I Married an Axe Murderer.

On 7 May 2007, a compilation album was released with the name of Some Furtive Years – A Ned's Anthology: "Furtive" is a reference to their earlier record label. Unlike the others, this compilation features liner notes by Penney and Cheslin, offering insight into the background of songs featured on the album.

== Reunited ==
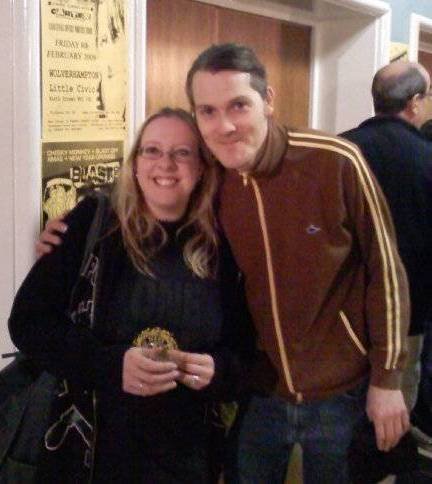
Vocalist Jonn Penney with a fan at a gig in Wolverhampton, December 2007

On 12 May 2008, the band announced that the original line-up would be performing live together for the first time since 1995, for a gig in London at The Astoria. When asked about performing together for the first time in over a decade, Penney stated, "It just felt right! There was the understandable awkwardness when we stood in a room together for the first time in 13 years, but that just melted away as soon as we started to play the songs." "We didn't really know what was going to happen once we got playing on stage, because it had been such a long time since we'd all been in it together. It's different from rehearsal. It was such an incredible kind of electric feeling atmosphere for everybody. You felt at one with the crowd again, similar to very early on, when everybody was excited about what was happening." Matt Cheslin says, "It was great, it's been quite nostalgic. I haven't played for the whole time that I haven't been in the band, but some of the really old songs I remember more. You do really notice the difference in the really early songs. It was as exciting as it was when I was 17."

Of the reunion shows, Penney said: "The reunion shows have gone down well and the fans gave us a massive welcome back so we wanted to do something different for them and play the album that made it happen for us. It was a time that was exciting for us and the fans, it is not an anniversary as such, we just wanted to celebrate that album and era."

Penney spoke of the loyalty of Ned's Atomic Dustbin fans in a 2009 interview. "We see masses of familiar faces every time we play – we were always pretty familiar with our audiences anyway and we're very lucky that so many of them are so loyal to us. People still fly in to shows from all over the world – Japan, Australia, Canada, U.S. and all over Europe. It's incredibly humbling to see these people keep coming back."

When asked whether Ned's Atomic Dustbin are planning on recording any new material together, Penney replied, "I think we will, but don't hold your breath – songwriting is a slow process for Ned's."

The band has continued to play event-style gigs with other 1990s indie bands, such as the Nedstock shows in Leeds, Birmingham and London with Republica and Cud in November 2013. On 24 May 2014, Ned's Atomic Dustbin headlined the Gigantic Classic Indie All-Dayer in Manchester, with The Wedding Present, Cud, The Frank and Walters and The Sultans of Ping. In 2014 Ned's Atomic Dustbin also joined a host of 1990s indie stars to play the first Mute Elephant Promotions 'Indie Daze' festival on 13 September, at The Forum in Kentish Town.

== Ned's Acoustic Dustbin ==
Jonn Penney and Rat performing an acoustic set in 2026

Encouraged by Miles Hunt to perform some songs acoustically, Ned's Acoustic Dustbin was born in 2017. Featuring Jonn and Rat, the duo released the album Ned's Acoustic Dustbin in 2019 which featured versions of such tracks as "Intact" and "All I Ask of Myself Is That I Hold Together" without drums or bass. The duo toured in support of the release.

== Members ==
Classic lineup 1989–1995, 2008–present

- Jonn Penney – vocals
- Gareth "Rat" Pring – guitars, keyboards
- Alex Griffin – bass, guitars, keyboards, backing vocals
- Matt "Mat" Cheslin – bass
- Dan Worton – drums

Reformation-era members, 2000–2008

- Martin Warlow – guitar
- Andy King – bass

Other members

- Tracey – vocals (1988-1989)
- Wiz – guitar (1995)
- Floyd – guitar (1995)

Timeline

== Discography ==
Furtive was the band's own label distributed under Sony, which allowed the band to retain a level of independence and control (although which subsidiary of Sony distributed each release depended on which one and where it was bought. In the UK it was Sony Soho Square, Japan Epic, and in the US they were shifted about – first Columbia, then Chaos, then Work.)

=== Albums ===
==== Studio albums ====
Year	Title	Label	UK	AUS	Notes
1991	God Fodder	Furtive	4	95	BPI: Silver
1992	Are You Normal?	Furtive	13	79	
1995	Brainbloodvolume	Furtive	—	128	

==== Compilation and live albums ====
Year	Title	Label	UK	AUS	Notes
1990	Bite	Chapter 22	72	—	Collection of the first two singles plus two other demo tracks, released without the band's consent.
1992	And Besides...	Furtive	—	—	Japanese only B-side collection
1994	0.522	Furtive	—	—	B-side and compilation track collection
1998	Intact – The Singles Collection	Sony	—	—	Compilation
2001	One More: No More	Gig	—	—	Live, 29 June 2000
2003	Terminally Groovy: The Best of Ned's Atomic Dustbin	Castle	—	—	"Best of" compilation
2004	Session	Shakedown	—	—	Re-recordings, live in studio
2007	Some Furtive Years: A Ned's Anthology	Camden	—	—	Compilation
2009	Reunited: 21 Years 21 Songs	Nyquest	—	—	Live, 23 May 2009
2015	KYTV 25: Live at Koko	Nyquest	—	—	Live, 17 July 2015
2019	Ned's Acoustic Dustbin	Good Deeds	—	—	Acoustic versions of Ned's tracks featuring Jonn and Rat. Released as Ned's Acoustic Dustbin. Recorded by Miles Hunt
"—" denotes releases that did not chart.

=== Singles and EPs ===
Year	Title	Label	UK	AUS	US Alt.	Notes
1990	The Ingredients EP	Chapter 22	92	—	—	First release
1990	"Kill Your Television"	Chapter 22	53	—	—	
1990	"Until You Find Out"	Chapter 22	51	—	—	
1991	"Happy"	Furtive	16	—	11	First release on Sony
1991	"Trust"	Furtive	21	—	—	
1991	"Grey Cell Green"	Furtive	—	93	24	US and Australian release
1992	"Kill Your Television"	Furtive	—	—	—	US release
1992	"Not Sleeping Around"	Furtive	19	—	1	
1992	"Intact"	Furtive	36	—	—	
1992	Live in Wolverhampton EP	Furtive	—	—	—	French 3-song live single with "Nothing Like" as the A-side
1993	"Walking Through Syrup"	Furtive	—	111	13	European/Australian/American release
1993	"Saturday Night"	Columbia	—	—	26	Cover of the Bay City Rollers track
1995	"All I Ask of Myself Is That I Hold Together"	Furtive	33	—	—	
1995	The Black Dog and Beaumont Hannant Remixes	Furtive	—	—	—	Remix EP of single "All I Ask of Myself Is That I Hold Together"
1995	"Stuck"	Furtive	64	—	—	
2006	"Hibernation"	Spitfirepink	92	—	—	
"—" denotes releases that did not chart or were not released in that territory.

=== Video and DVD ===
Year	Title	Label	Notes
1991	Nothing Is Cool	SMV Entertainment	Live and on tour footage
1993	Lunatic Magnets	SMV Entertainment	Mock interview and music videos
2003	Shoot the Neds! In Concert	Secret Films	Live, 1 June 2002
2007	...Don't Exist	Twelve42 Films	Documentary and live footage – Directed by Carl Beebee & AJ Davies.
