= Volume 1 (The Besnard Lakes album) =

Studio album by The Besnard Lakes
- Released: September 29, 2003
- Genre: Alternative
- Length: 43:59

The Besnard Lakes chronology
| Volume 1 (2003) | The Besnard Lakes Are the Dark Horse (2007) |

Professional ratings
Review scores
| Source | Rating |
|---|---|
| Pitchfork Media | (6.4/10) |

Volume 1 is the debut studio album from Canadian rock band The Besnard Lakes. Only a thousand copies were made for the 2003 release. The album was rereleased on a larger scale October 23, 2007.

The cover features the Princeton Similkameen Funeral Services home - the owner of which was charged in 2007 with fraud and offering an indignity to human remains.

== Track listing ==
| No. | Title | Length |
|---|---|---|
| 1. | "Skyscraper Girls" | 9:44 |
| 2. | "This Thing" | 4:35 |
| 3. | "For Spy Turned Musician" | 5:21 |
| 4. | "Thomasina" | 3:44 |
| 5. | "You've Got to Want to Be a Star" | 9:32 |
| 6. | "Deep, Desultory Dream" | 6:39 |
| 7. | "Life Rarely Begins with Tungsten Film #1" | 4:24 |

== Personnel ==
The Besnard Lakes

- Jace Lasek, Olga Goreas – guitars, basses, organs, Fender Rhodes, synthesizers, drums, saxophone, flute, vocals, reverbs and delays

Additional musician

- Gilles Catilloux – drums on "Deep, Desultory Dream"

Production

- The Besnard Lakes – production, recording
- JJ Golden – mastering
- Jace Lasek – artwork
- Todd Stewart – design assistance
