= Mega City Four =

English indie rock band

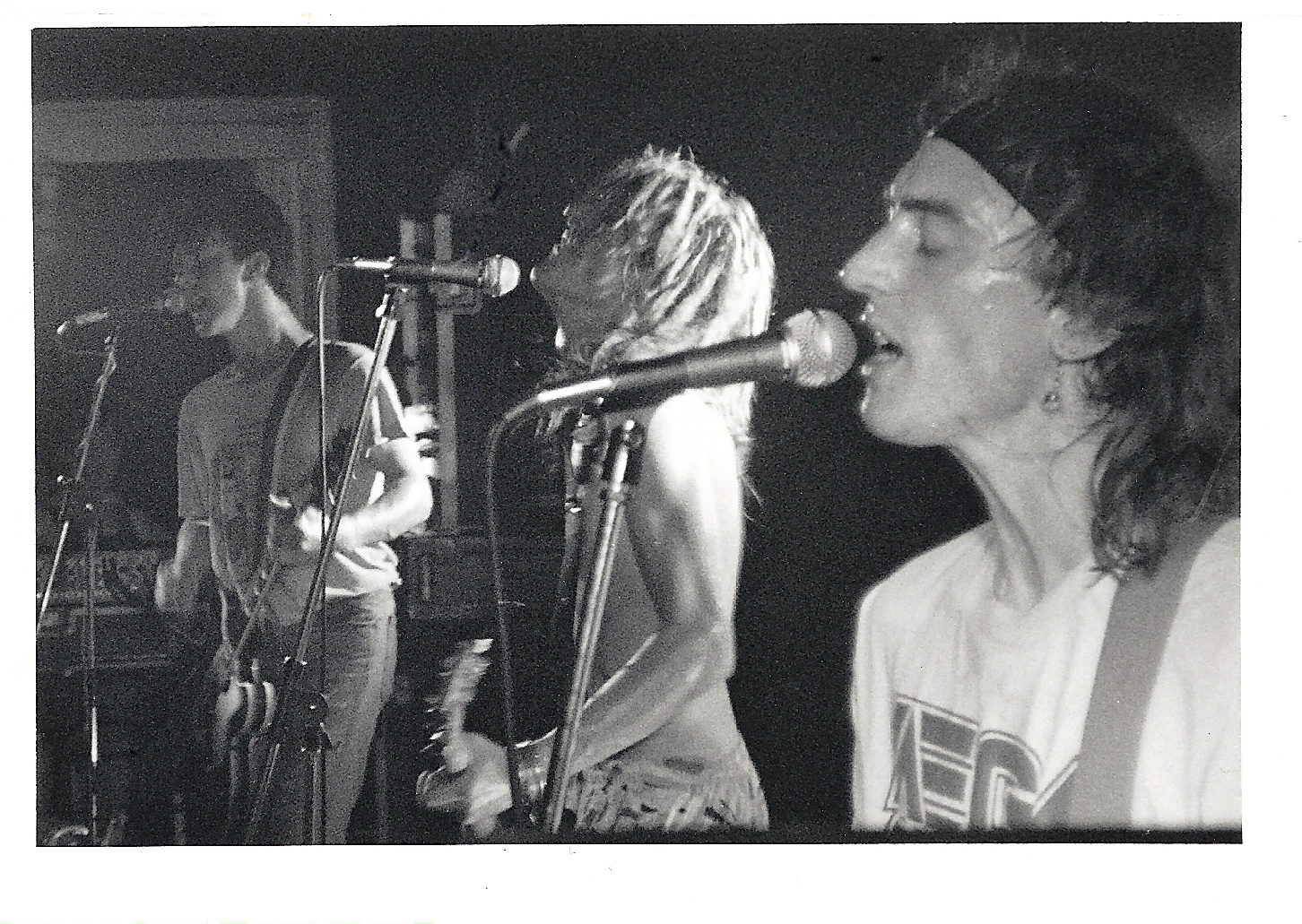
- Mega City Four performing at The Venue, Oxford, UK in 1990.

Background information
- Also known as: MC4, Mega City 4
- Origin: Farnborough, Hampshire, England
- Genres: Pop rock, indie rock, pop punk, fraggle
- Years active: 1987–1996; 2007
- Labels: Primitive; Decoy; Big Life; Fire
- Past members: Wiz; Danny Brown; Gerry Bryant; Chris Jones
- Website: http://www.megacityfour.co.uk/

Mega City Four were an English indie rock band formed in Farnborough, Hampshire, who obtained popularity throughout the late 1980s and 1990s.

Mega City Four consisted of guitarist and vocalist Wiz, his brother and rhythm guitarist Danny Brown, bassist Gerry Bryant and drummer Chris Jones. According to Uncut magazine, the group "earned a reputation across the globe as an exciting live band".

== History ==
=== Early Formation ===
Wiz and Bryant were in a band together at school called 'Stallion', who performed two shows together. One of the shows took place at Cove Secondary School (where "Stallion will come for you" stickers were handed out in an attempt to bolster the bands following) and the show was concluded when the school cut the power. Wiz, seeking more independence to write his own music, decided he wanted to form a new band with Bryant and Danny Brown, named 'Capricorn', after the brothers' shared the star sign.

Capricorn formed in June 1982. They consisted of drummer Martin Steib, vocalist and guitarist Wiz, rhythm guitarist Danny and bassist Gerry. The band had a personal fallout in regards to musical direction and dissolved in 1986. A four-track demo was recorded in 1982, and they released one demo, titled 'The Good News Tape' in 1985.

=== From Capricorn to Mega City Four ===
The trio of Gerry, Danny and Wiz maintained closeness and enlisted Chris Jones (who drummed in local band Exit East) to join their new group. The new name, initially suggested by Steib in the Capricorn era, was decided as Mega City Four. The group were officially formed in 1987 and the band's career started with performing gigs around their local town of Farnborough before making their vinyl debut in September 1987 with "Miles Apart"/"Running in Darkness". The single led to a round of gigs with fellow punk-influenced bands like Senseless Things and Snuff.

"Miles Apart" and "Running" were reissued (separately) in 1988 on the independent label Decoy, along with the more melodic "Distant Relatives" and "Less Than Senseless". A healthy following latched on to them quickly, and by 1988 the group were performing to packed audiences on a regular basis. Continuing on their local success, the band would eventually release their 1989 debut album, Tranzophobia.

The band continued to tour extensively in the UK, Europe and North America, working with bands including Les Thugs, Ned's Atomic Dustbin, Carter The Unstoppable Sex Machine and Doughboys, amongst many others. The band's second studio album, Who Cares Wins, was released in 1990. Extensive touring across Europe began again, with the band performing in the Reading Festival that year. Who Cares Wins was followed by a compilation album of their early 7" singles, called Terribly Sorry Bob (1991). The band subsequently moved to a major record label to record two further studio albums, Sebastopol Rd. (1992) (recorded by Jessica Corcoran at London's Greenhouse Recording Studios) and Magic Bullets (1993). This album produced the singles "Wallflower" and "Iron Sky", which both placed 69 and 48 in the UK Singles Chart respectively. After falling out with their record label, they moved to Fire Records to record their final studio album, Soulscraper (1996). In addition to their studio albums, the band also released a live album, a Peel Sessions disc, and a number of singles. The British music journalist, Martin Roach, wrote a biography of the band, Mega City Four: Tall Stories and Creepy Crawlies, published in 1993.

=== Demise ===
The band had been together for over a decade when they broke up in early 1996. Wiz moved to Montreal, Quebec, Canada and joined Canadian alternative rock band, Doughboys. Wiz and Bryant continued playing together in a group Wiz formed called Serpico after the demise of Mega City Four. After Serpico, Wiz went on to form Ipanema, who were still playing and recording until late 2006.

==== After Mega City Four ====
Having just returned from a tour of the United States, Wiz collapsed at a band rehearsal. It was announced on 7 December 2006 that Wiz had died at St George's Hospital, Tooting, South London from a blood clot on the brain on 6 December.

Bassist Gerry Bryant currently owns and runs The Rooms Rehearsal Studios in Farnborough, Hampshire.

Drummer Chris Jones performs on "The Snakes" 2013 album "Last Days of Rock & Roll" as well as the "Richard Davies & The Dissidents" albums "Human Traffic" (2020) and "High Times & Misdemeanours" (2025)

British band Muse released a cover of the Mega City Four song "Prague", as a b-side to their single "Resistance" on 22 February 2010. This was dedicated to Wiz, as Muse had been inspired by Mega City Four's music.

Sebastopol Rd. was reissued through 3 Loop Music in September 2013. The re-issue has previously unreleased demos and also John Peel session tracks. The album was issued for the 21st anniversary of its original release.

== Influences ==
Mega City Four cited influences including the Replacements, Hüsker Dü, Fugazi, Minor Threat, Bad Brains, Senseless Things, the Smiths, Ramones, the Clash, Penetration, David Bowie and early Iron Maiden.

== Members ==
- Darren 'Wiz' Brown – lead vocals, lead guitar (1987–1996; died 2006)
- Danny Brown – rhythm guitar, backing vocals (1987–1996)
- Gerry Bryant – bass, backing vocals (1987–1996)
- Chris Jones – drums (1987–1996)

=== 'Four for Wiz' Tribute Concerts ===
- Steve Croom – lead vocals (2006)

== Discography ==
=== Albums ===
- Tranzophobia (June 1989) (UK No. 67)
- Who Cares Wins (October 1990)
- Terribly Sorry Bob (April 1991)
- Sebastopol Rd. (February 1992) (UK No. 41)
- Inspiringly Titled (Spring 1992, Live album)
- Magic Bullets (1993) (UK No. 57)
- Peel Sessions (1993)
- Soulscraper (1996)

=== Singles and EPs ===
- "Miles Apart" / "Running in Darkness" (March 1988)
- "Clear Blue Sky" (November 1988)
- "Less Than Senseless" (March 1989)
- "Awkward Kid" (October 1989)
- "There Goes My Happy Marriage / Finish EP" (1990)
- "Words That Say" (September 1991) (UK No. 66)
- "Stop" / "Stop (Live)" (January 1992) (UK No. 36)
- "Shivering Sand" / "Shivering Sand (Live)" (May 1992) (UK No. 35)
- "Iron Sky" (May 1993) (UK No. 48)
- "Wallflower" / "Wallflower Live EP" (July 1993) (UK No. 69)
- "Skidding" (September 1995)
- "Superstar" / "Chrysanth" (1995)
- "Android Dreams" (February 1996)
