= Jonathan Cummins =

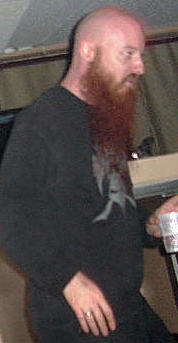
- Cummins in 2005

Background information
- Also known as: Jon Widdalee Cummins
- Origin: Toronto, Ontario, Canada
- Genres: Rock
- Occupations: Guitarist, record producer
- Instrument: Guitar

Jonathan Cummins is a Canadian musician and record producer originally from Toronto, now based out of Montreal, Quebec. He has played in Circus Lupus, the Doughboys, Treble Charger, Bionic, Goddo, The Parachute Club, The Headpins, and The Besnard Lakes. He has produced albums by Starvin Hungry, Tricky Woo, The Hot Springs, Dead Messenger, the Donkeys, Bullmoose and more.

Cummins was also formerly a music columnist for the Montreal Mirror "alternative" newsweekly, until it was closed in 2012. Currently, Jonathan co-hosts Psi Factor and the Cougar's Str8talk, a weekly podcast.
