= Yeah Right! Records =

Yeah Right! Records is an independent record label based in London, Ontario Canada. Founded in 2002, it has released CDs by London bands The Matadors, Midwives, Terminal Wallys as well as UK rock band The Loyalties, Vancouver bands The Spitfires and C.C. Voltage. Since 2008, the label has focused on vinyl releases include a split single by C'Mon and Pride Tiger, and a spoken word single called Having Fun With Danko Jones On Stage. The label also includes Ancient Shapes, Public Animal,'63 Monroe, Brat Farrar, Broken Gold, Giant Drag, Annie Hardy, UIC, Guitar Magazine, Sick Things, Sweet Dave, Ian Blurton, Good As Gone, and The Black Halos.
