= Jace Lasek =

Canadian musician and record producer

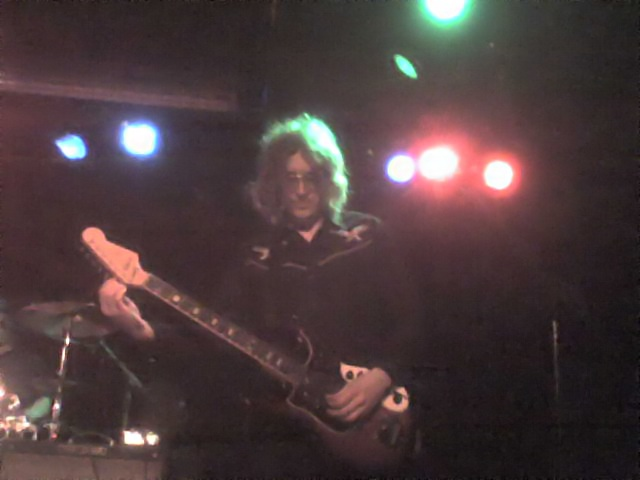
- Jace Lasek at Les Saints in Montreal 2008.

Background information
- Genres: Alternative rock, indie rock, experimental
- Instruments: guitar, bass, vocals, keyboards, drums
- Label: Jagjaguwar

Jace Lasek is a Canadian musician and producer living in Montreal. He and his wife Olga Goreas are the principal songwriters for the Montreal-based indie rock band The Besnard Lakes. Lasek plays guitar, bass, drums and keyboards. He is also the band's lead vocalist.

Furthermore, Lasek runs Breakglass Studio in Montreal. He has produced or engineered many albums (or portions of albums) including ones by Sunset Rubdown, Wolf Parade, Elliot Maginot, The Loodies, Mark Berube, Sunday Sinners, Patrick Watson, Land of Talk, Yes We Mystic, Final Flash, Suuns, Human Human, Dead Messenger, Starvin Hungry, Intensive Care, Close Talker, Kiss Me Deadly, Terry Uyarak and Young Galaxy. Aside from co-producing the latter's self-titled debut album, he also plays guitar or drums on every track. Lasek is a member of the duo Light Conductor.

He is also part of The Soft Province, a side project with his long-time friend Michael Gardiner. Their first album was released by Three Ring Records on February 22, 2011.
