= The Besnard Lakes =

Canadian indie rock band

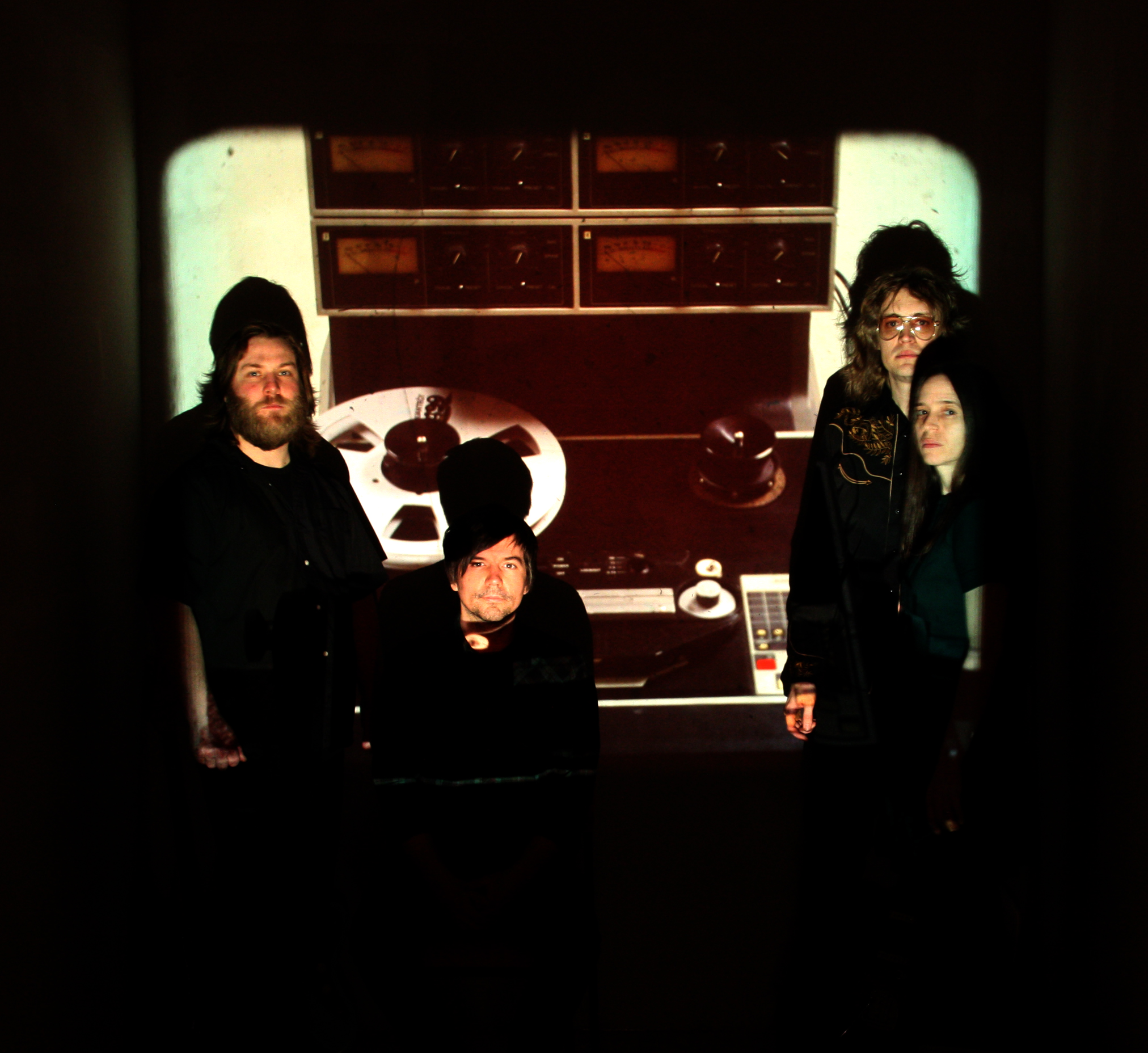
- The Besnard Lakes. (Left to right: Kevin Laing, Richard White, Jace Lasek, Olga Goreas)

Background information
- Origin: Montreal, Quebec, Canada
- Genres: Indie rock, shoegaze, post-rock, new prog
- Years active: 2003–present
- Labels: FatCat (US); Flemish Eye (Canada); Full Time Hobby (Rest of world)
- Members: Jace Lasek; Olga Goreas; Kevin Laing; Richard White; Sheenah Ko; Robbie MacArthur
- Past members: Steve Raegele; Jeremiah Bullied; Nicole Lizée
- Website: www.thebesnardlakes.com

The Besnard Lakes (/ˈbɛznɜːrd/ BEZ-nerd) are a Canadian indie rock band from Montreal, Quebec, Canada. Formed in 2003 by the husband and wife team of Jace Lasek and Olga Goreas, the band also includes Kevin Laing (drums), Richard White (guitar), Sheenah Ko (keyboards) and Robbie MacArthur (guitar).

Two of the band's six albums have been nominated for the Polaris Music Prize.

== History ==
=== Early career (2003–2013) ===
The band are currently a six-piece centered around the atmospheric songs of Lasek and Goreas, whose expansive sound draws from numerous aspects of rock 'n' roll history. The band's name comes from Besnard Lake in North-Central Saskatchewan. The band's second album, The Besnard Lakes Are the Dark Horse was recorded at singer Lasek's own Breakglass Studios, with members of Stars, The Dears and Godspeed You! Black Emperor/Silver Mt. Zion making guest appearances. It was nominated for the 2007 Polaris Music Prize. Many songs on The Besnard Lakes Are the Dark Horse are prefaced by recordings from shortwave radio number stations as first made popular in recordings such as The Conet Project.

In 2007, they were featured, along with The Stills, Karkwa and Mahjor Bidet, on the bill of Quebec Scene, a concert in Ottawa sponsored by CBC Radio 3.

A third studio album, The Besnard Lakes Are the Roaring Night, was released on Jagjaguwar on March 9, 2010. A 12" record featuring album track "Albatross" and "Four Long Lines" was released on February 9, 2010. This album was a shortlisted nominee for the 2010 Polaris Music Prize.

The band wrote their first film score for the film Sympathy for Delicious, from actor/director Mark Ruffalo. They also wrote and performed the score for the National Film Board of Canada web documentary Welcome to Pine Point. The collaboration came about when Lasek was approached by the website's co-creator Mike Simons, an old friend from high school. The soundtrack includes their reworking of the Trooper single, "We're Here for a Good Time (Not a Long Time)". The group released their score for Welcome to Pine Point as a twelve-inch EP entitled You Lived in the City. The album also features a previously unreleased outtake from their score for the film Memories Corner entitled "The Corner".

=== Until in Excess, Imperceptible UFO (2013–2014) ===
A new studio album, Until in Excess, Imperceptible UFO, was released in April 2013. In June the album was longlisted for the 2013 Polaris Music Prize.

In 2014, guitarist Richard White removed himself from the band's touring line-up. A message on the band's official website stated, "After seven years, our beloved guitar player Richard White has decided not to tour anymore. You can still expect to hear his virtuosic playing on our albums. but sadly, you will not see him on stage with us much anymore. We'd like to take this opportunity to thank Richard from the bottom of our hearts for all the dedicated years of performing with us." Following White's live departure, guitarist Robbie MacArthur, a member of The High Dials, joined the band's touring line-up, alongside keyboardist Sheenah Ko.

=== A Coliseum Complex Museum and The Divine Wind (2015–2019) ===
Following the completion of the Until in Excess, Imperceptible UFO tour, both Ko and MacArthur joined the band's full line-up. The six-piece began work on its fifth studio album, A Coliseum Complex Museum. The release was preceded in late 2015 by an EP entitled The Golden Lion.

In 2017, the band released an EP, called The Besnard Lakes Are the Divine Wind.

=== The Last of the Great Thunderstorm Warnings (2020–2024) ===
After a lengthy hiatus, the band released its sixth studio album, The Besnard Lakes Are the Last of the Great Thunderstorm Warnings in January, 2021. A twenty-seven minute long EP, entitled The Besnard Lakes Are the Prayers for the Death of Fame, was released in October 2022 on Full Time Hobby.

=== A Live and Ghost Nation (2025-present) ===
On April 25, 2025, the band released a 14-track live album, entitled The Besnard Lakes Are A Live. Later that summer, they announced their seventh studio release, The Besnard Lakes Are the Ghost Nation. The album was released on October 10, 2025, also through Full Time Hobby. It was written, produced, and composed by Jace Lasek and Olga Gore, and recorded at Lost River Studio, The Rigaud Ranch, and Breakglass Studios in Quebec. Lead single, "In Hollywood," was released prior to the album’s launch.

== Discography ==
=== Albums ===
- Volume 1 (2003)
- The Besnard Lakes Are the Dark Horse (2007)
- The Besnard Lakes Are the Roaring Night (2010)
- Until in Excess, Imperceptible UFO (2013)
- A Coliseum Complex Museum (2016)
- The Besnard Lakes Are the Last of the Great Thunderstorm Warnings (2021)
- The Besnard Lakes Are A Live (2025)
- The Besnard Lakes Are the Ghost Nation (2025)

=== EPs ===
- You Lived in the City (2011)
- The Golden Lion (2015)
- The Besnard Lakes Are the Divine Wind (2017)
- The Besnard Lakes Are the Prayers for the Death of Fame (2022)

=== Singles ===
- "Would Anybody Come to Visit Me" (10", Static Caravan, 2005)
- "Casino Nanaimo" (12", Jagjaguwar, 2007)
- "For Agent 13" (2007)
- "Albatross" (12", Jagjaguwar, 2010)
- "People of the Sticks" (Jagjaguwar, 2013)
- "Raindrops" (Full Time Hobby, Flemish Eye, FatCat Records, 2020)
- "Our Heads, Our Hearts on Fire Again" (Full Time Hobby, Flemish Eye, FatCat Records, 2020)
- "Superego" (Self Released, 2021)

== See also ==
- Canadian musical groups
- Canadian rock
- List of bands from Canada
- List of Canadian musicians

== Notes ==
- Rajagopalan, Pras (March 2007). "Pop Rocks: The Besnard Lakes Are The Dark Horse". Exclaim!. Archived from the original on September 30, 2007.
- Sterdan, Darryl (February 22, 2007). "The Besnard Lakes Are The Dark Horse (review)". Jam! (Sun Media). Archived from the original on March 10, 2016.
