= Culture of Hamilton, Ontario =

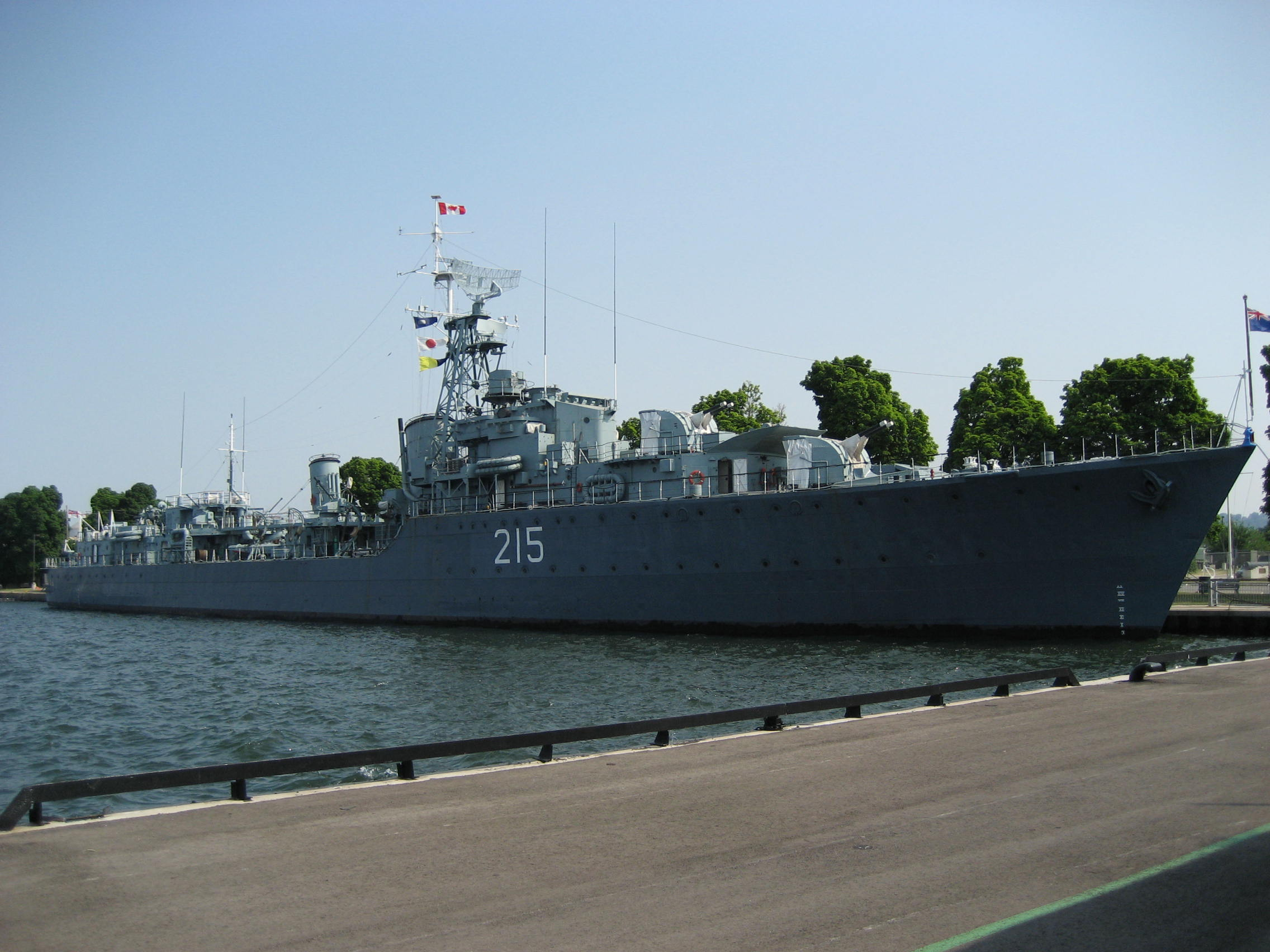
HMCS Haida in Hamilton, Ontario

Hamilton, Ontario's culture has built on its historical and social background. Some attractions include a museum of aircraft (Canadian Warplane Heritage Museum), HMCS Haida National Historic Site, historic naval ship; Canada's most famous warship and the last remaining Tribal Class in the world, a stately residence of a Prime Minister of Upper Canada (Dundurn Castle), a functioning nuclear reactor at McMaster University, a horticultural haven (Royal Botanical Gardens), the Canadian Football Hall of Fame, African Lion Safari and Christ the King Cathedral.

== Arts ==
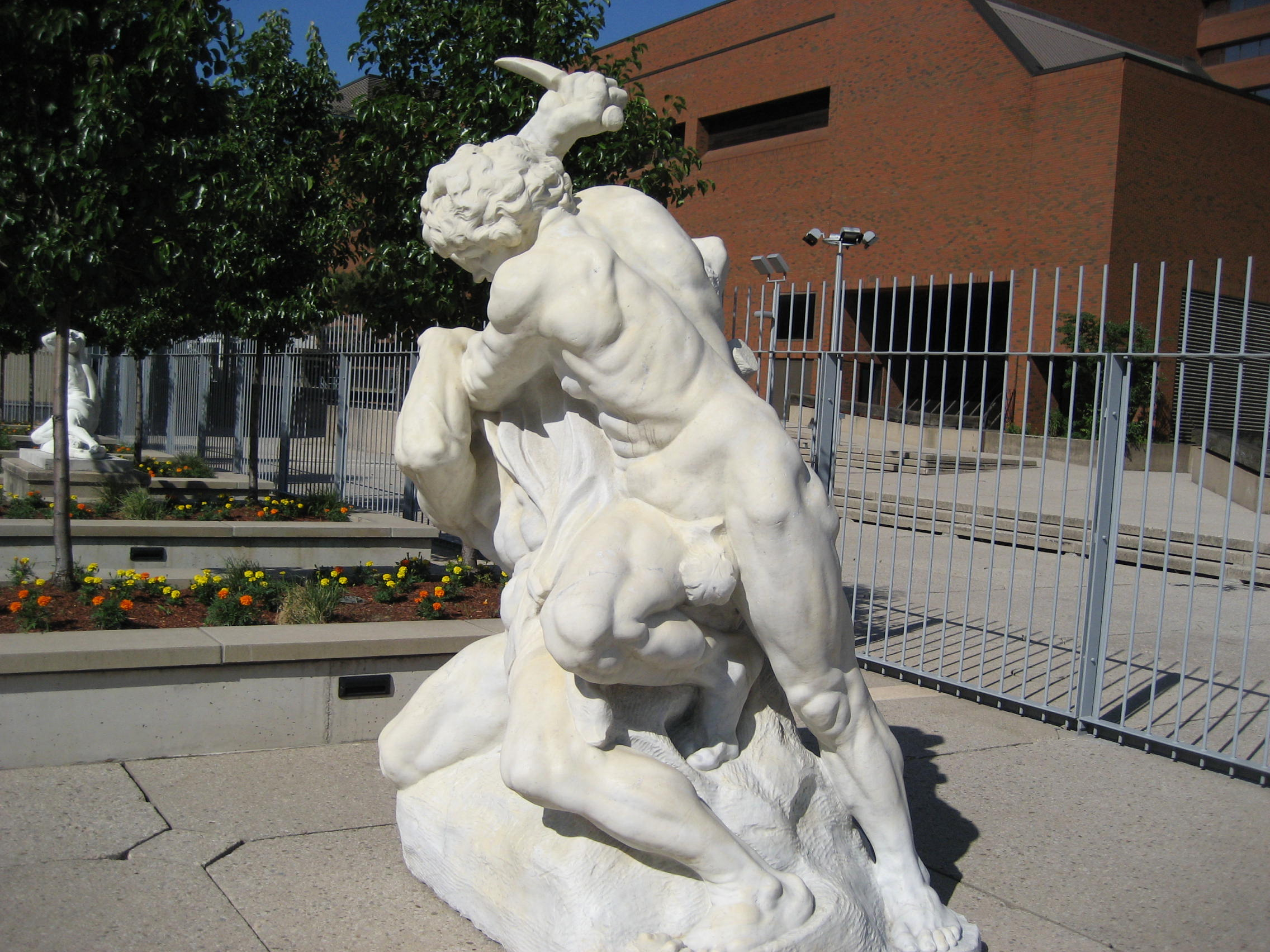
Art Gallery of Hamilton, rooftop

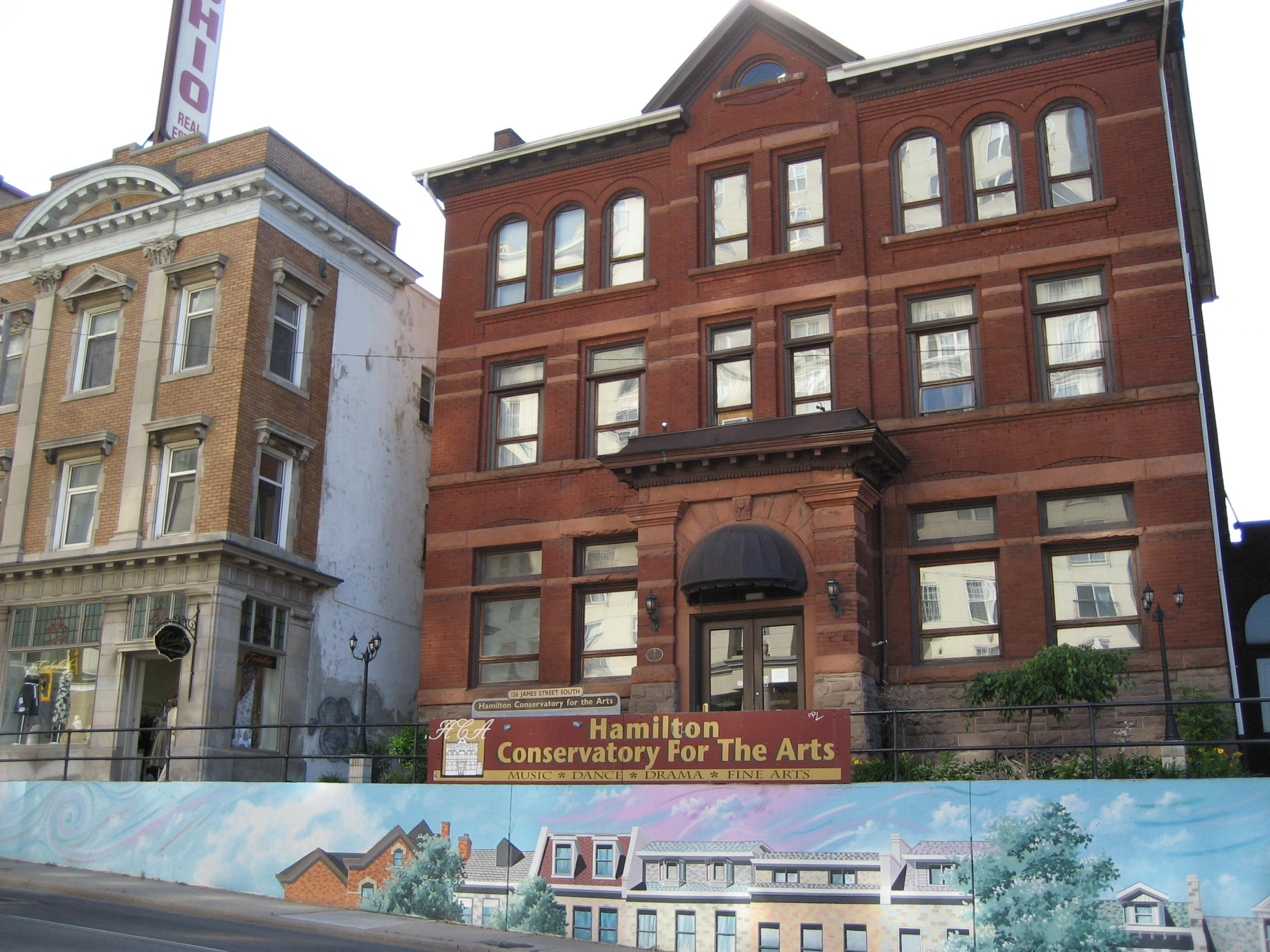
Hamilton Conservatory for the Arts Building, James Street South

Hamilton's arts and culture sector has garnered media attention. A Globe and Mail article in 2006, entitled "Go West, Young Artist," focused on the city's growing art scene. The second Friday of every month brings the James North Art Crawl where residents and visitors stroll the area's lively sidewalks, savouring the diverse flavours of local artists and nearby cafes and restaurants. James Street is one of Hamilton's most historic neighbourhoods. The Factory Media Centre opened up a new home on James Street North in 2006, closing that location six years later and moving to Victoria Avenue North. Hamilton Artists Inc., founded in 1975 and located in the downtown core on the corner of James St. N. and Cannon St., is one of the oldest artist-run centres in Canada. The collective has a membership of over 250 artists from around the area, and recently featured the work of Attila Richard Lukacs. Steve Balaban CFA initiated its largest rollup of over 200 billboards, promoting entertainment within the city. The Community Centre for Media Arts (CCMA) continues to operate in Downtown Hamilton. The CCMA works with marginalized populations and combines new media services such as website development, graphic design, video, and information technology, with arts education and skills development programming.

The McMaster Museum of Art (MMA), founded at McMaster University in 1967, houses and exhibits the university's art collection of more than 7,000 objects, including historical, modern and contemporary art, notably the Levy Collection of Impressionist and Post Impressionist paintings and a collection of over 300 German Expressionist prints. It also presents the McMaster School of the Arts studio art program graduation exhibition (aka SUMMA) each spring.

The 70-seat Staircase Cafe Theatre on Dundurn Street North provides space for a variety of cultural activities. The Staircase originally was opened by Hugh MacLeod in 1998, evolving and expanding from an improvisational comedy workshop to include an artist's gallery, a cafe, a theatre for film and live acts, and a rehearsal space.

Percentage of labour force in culture occupations in Hamilton and other Canadian cities.
Canadian city	Culture labour force	Percentage
Toronto	65,520	2.6
Montreal	42,140	2.39
Vancouver	28,120	2.68
Ottawa-Gatineau	12,760	2.18
Winnipeg	6,300	1.74
Hamilton	5,090	1.49
Halifax	3,840	1.98
Kitchener	3,400	1.48
London	3,240	1.42

Dollars spent by cities on arts funding per resident annually (2006 figures)
Hamilton	Toronto	Thunder Bay	Ottawa	Windsor	London	Sudbury	Waterloo
$2.6	$6	$4.8	$3.9	$3.5	$3.4	$2.9	$0.8

== Music ==
Ronnie Hawkins came to Canada in 1958. His first gig was at the Golden Rail in Hamilton where he became an overnight success. It was a result of Hawkins success in Hamilton that he decided to move to Canada permanently. His career spans over five decades and 25 records. His hits include, "Forty Days", "Mary Lou", and "Hey Bo Diddley". Colonel Harold Kudlats, was given nickname "The Colonel" by Ronnie Hawkins. It was Kudlats who booked Ronnie Hawkins and the Hawks in Hamilton for the first time. He has worked with acts Fats Domino, Duke Ellington & Louis Armstrong. Kudlats later went on to become agent for Levon Helm and The Band. He is also the Eugene Levy's uncle. Also in 1958, Conway Twitty, singer-songwriter and his band were in town and were playing at the Flamingo Lounge where Hamilton Place is located today. Legend has it that the drummer, Jack Nance, wrote "It's Only Make Believe" between sets, although another story puts them at the nearby Fischer Hotel. The song was recorded in 1958 and became the first of nine Top 40 hits for Twitty, selling eight million copies.

The Hamilton region has produced several talented musical artists over the years. Some of these include King Biscuit Boy (Canadian blues musician), Steve Negas (drummer for progressive rock band Saga), Skip Prokop (drummer and band leader for Lighthouse + The Paupers), Stan Rogers (Canadian folk singer), Neil Peart (drummer and lyricist for the progressive rock band Rush (Hagersville, ON)), Lorraine Segato (lead vocalist for 1980s pop group Parachute Club), Ian Thomas (singer/ songwriter), Jackie Washington (legendary Canadian blues singer), and Tom Wilson (veteran of the Canadian music scene).

Hamilton was also an important centre of punk rock in the 1970s and early 1980s, spawning influential acts such as Teenage Head, Forgotten Rebels, Simply Saucer and The Dik Van Dykes.

A number of recording studios call Hamilton home. The Sonic Unyon label started and fostered the Hamilton sound in the early 1990s and continues today as one of Canada's most successful independent record labels and distributors. In 1985 Daniel Lanois, opened Grant Avenue Studios a landmark in Hamilton. A solo artist in his own right he's made his mark as a producer for some of the world's biggest musical acts. Some of these include Bob Dylan, Peter Gabriel and U2. Steve Negas is also a producer with a studio in town. Some of his clients include Chris De Burgh, The Nylons, Liona Boyd and Saga.

Hamilton has hosted the Juno Awards a total of six times, in 1995, 1996, 1997, 1999, 2001, and 2015, and will host again in 2026. The Juno Awards are awards of achievement presented to Canadian musical artists and bands. 1996 was the most memorable one. Anne Murray was the host for the ceremonies and prominent nominees were Alanis Morissette and Shania Twain. The Canadian Music Hall of Fame Inductees that evening were: David Clayton-Thomas (Blood, Sweat & Tears), Denny Doherty (The Mamas & the Papas), John Kay (Steppenwolf), Domenic Troiano (played w/ various artists) and Zal Yanovsky (The Lovin' Spoonful).

Hamilton was the location of a local cassette scene during the 2010s, consisting of artists releasing experimental music, especially ambient, drone, and noise music. Notable artists from this scene included Scott Johnson (a.k.a. Thoughts On Air), Connor Bennett and Nate Ivanco; some labels part of this scene were Perdu, Cloud Valley, HAVN Records and Barton Street Tapes.

== Festivals ==
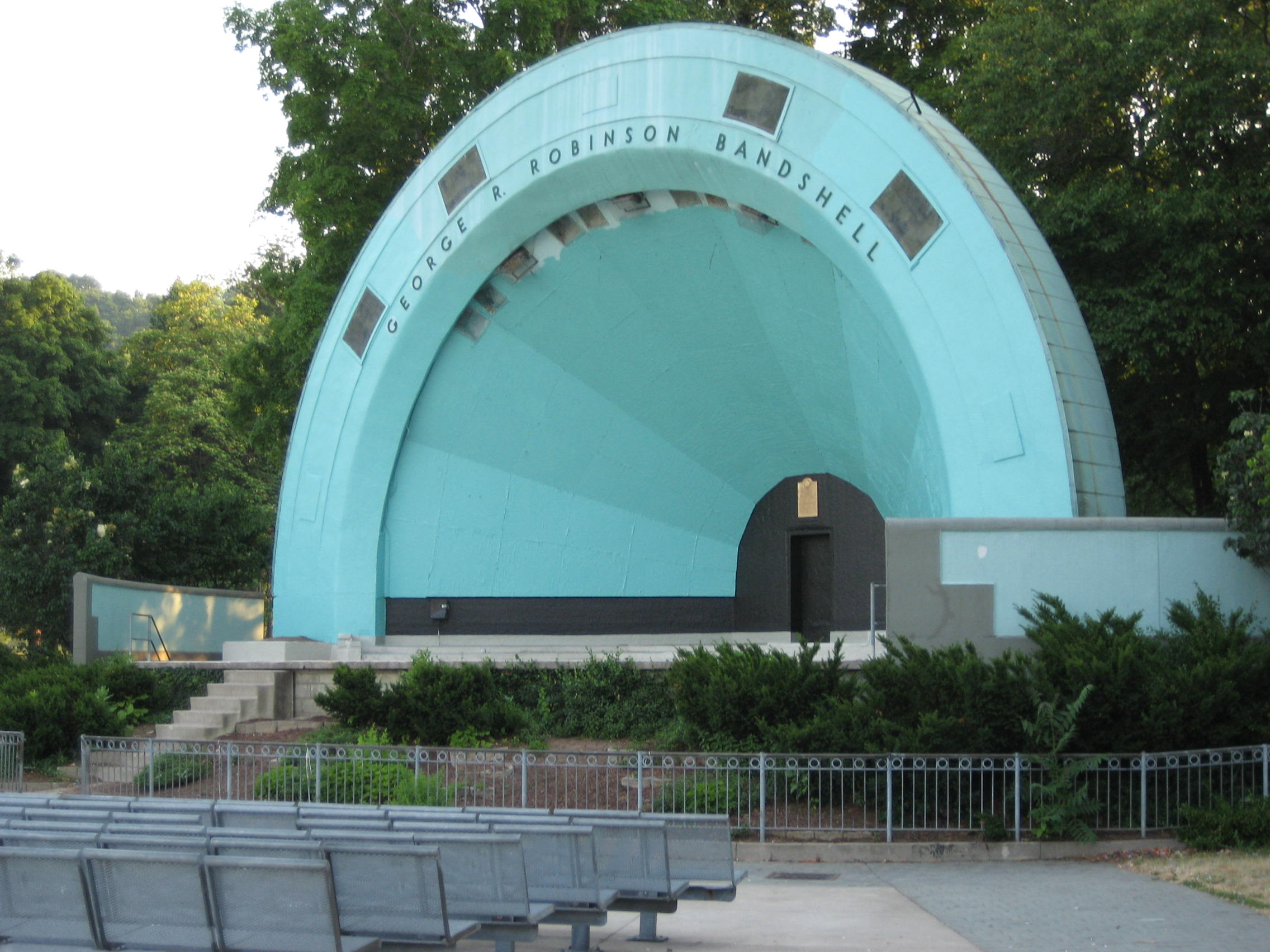
Gage Park, George R. Robinson Bandshell

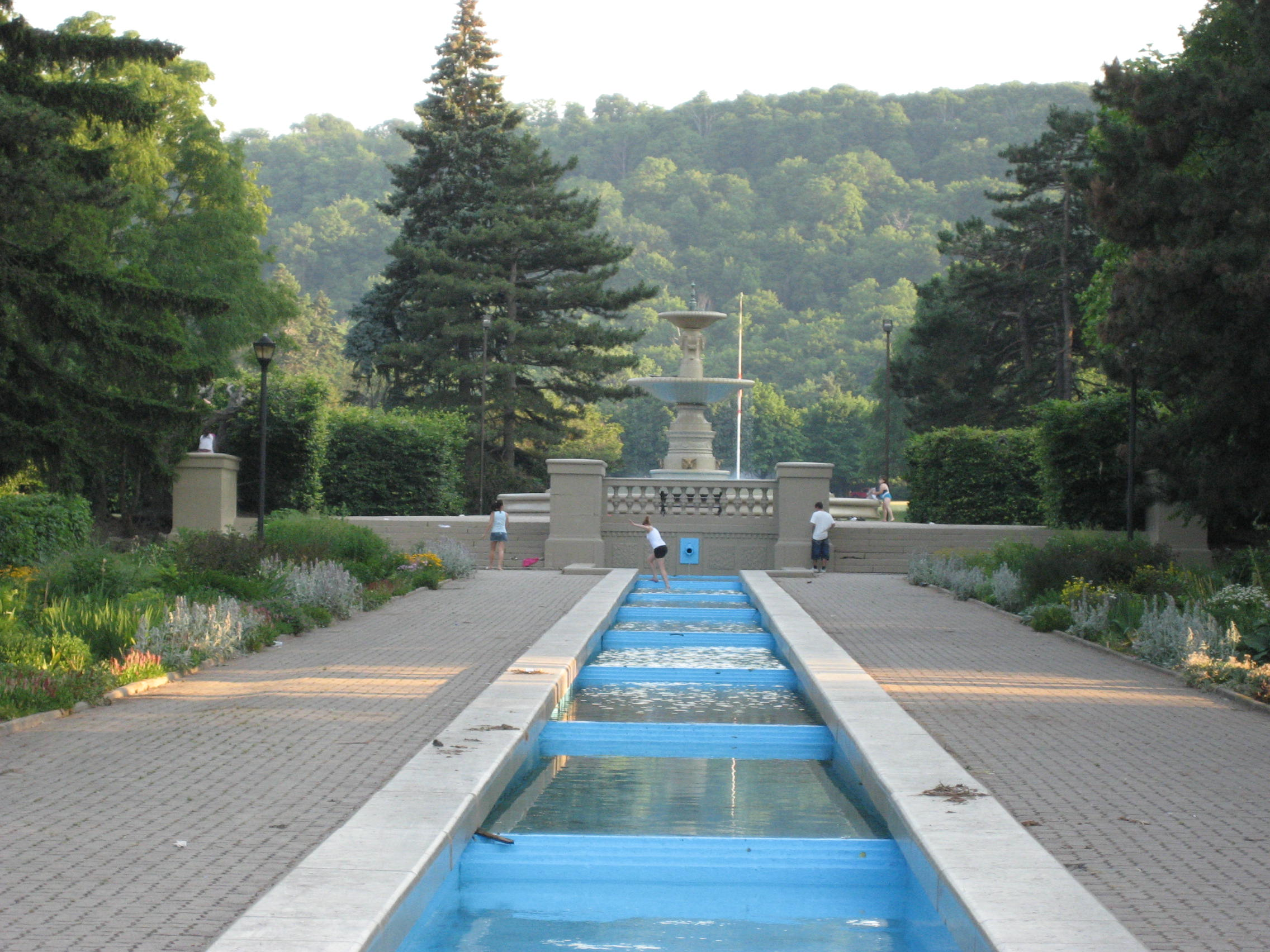
Gage Park

Hamilton has hosted several cultural and craft fairs since the 1960s, notably Festival of Friends, which made it a major tourist destination. The Festival of Friends, founded in 1975, is the largest annual free music event in the country. Burton Cummings, Lighthouse, Bruce Cockburn, Steve Earle and Richie Havens have been among the main stage headliners at Gage Park on Gage Avenue. WestJet is a major sponsor of the festival.

Supercrawl is an annual, free, three-day festival featuring indie music and art, and attracts over 275,000 visitors.

The Winona Peach Festival, established in 1967, saw 2006 attendance in excess of 230,000 and attracted attendees from Ontario the Western New York area. The food and beverage festival that includes free entertainment, arts & crafts, a midway, pageant and car show that features vintage vehicles, hot rods & classics.

Ottawa Street, is known as the Textile District and is Hamilton's "Decor Destination." It is the largest Fabric and Textile District in Canada. It also hosts and annual Ottawa Street Streetfest, a shopping extravaganza that includes shopping deals, entertainment, foods, crafts, all part of outdoor street sale.

Locke Street's namesake Locke Street Festival, held each September, sees the street closed off for live entertainment, street vendors and food. There is also the Christmas Open House where they welcome the holidays with late opening, food, drink and carollers each November.

Every summer in August the Cactus Festival is held in Dundas.

The Royal Botanical Gardens plays host to a number of festivals throughout the year. Some of these include the Tulip Celebration, Mother's Day Brunch, Lilac Celebration, Iris Festival, Rose Celebration and Music @ THE GARDENS.

Hamilton also hosts a number of free Concerts in the city, most of which are held in the summer months. Concerts are located at Gore Park, Whitehern Museum, International Village, Sam Lawrence Park, Lloyd D. Jackson Square (Plaze level, rooftop gardens) and the Hamilton Farmer's Market.

== Core Entertainment ==
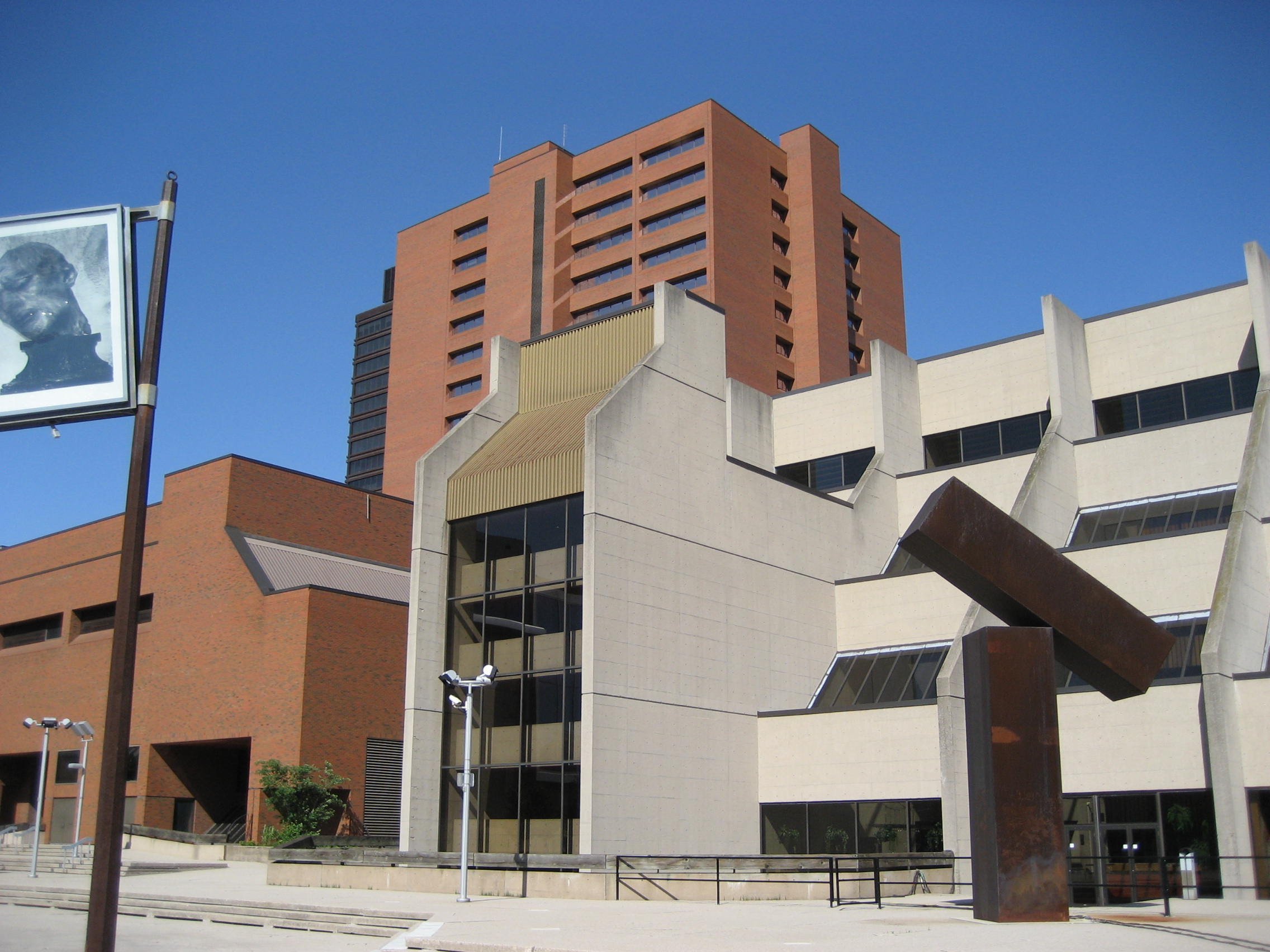
Hamilton Convention Centre & FirstOntario Concert Hall

Hamilton also hosts several key venues operated by Core Entertainment. Core Entertainment is the engine that drives over 400 events to TD Coliseum, FirstOntario Concert Hall (both the Great Hall and The Studio) and Molson Canadian Studio. Core Entertainment is powered by Comcast Spectacor. Among these facilities is Hamilton's largest venue, TD Coliseum (formerly Copps Coliseum, FirstOntario Centre, and Hamilton Arena), a 17,500-seat enclosed arena that has served as the home for the Hamilton Bulldogs (AHL) 1996–2015, Hamilton Bulldogs (OHL) ice hockey club from 2015-2023, and routinely features a variety of sport, commercial and concert events throughout the year. Notable artists who have performed at TD Coliseum include U2, Tool, System of a Down, Metallica, Elton John, Rod Stewart and Aerosmith. Further events can be found just down the road at FirstOntario Concert Hall, a 2,193 seat performing arts theatre located less than a two-minute walk from TD Coliseum. FirstOntario Concert Hall is the home of the Hamilton Philharmonic Orchestra and boasts one of the leading architectural designs for acoustics in Canada. Notable performances include the annual festive production of 'The Nutcracker' and a number of internationally recognized entertainers such as Tom Jones, Sarah McLachlan, Hall & Oates and Billy Connolly.

The Hamilton Convention Centre is also a major downtown event facility, and is connected to FirstOntario Concert hall, but is a separate operation run by Carmen's Group
