= It Came from Canada =

1980s music compilation series

It Came from Canada is a series of compilation albums, released on Og Music in the 1980s, which featured music by independent, alternative and punk bands from Canada.

The compilations were influential in the evolution of Canada's alternative music scene in the 1980s, regularly charting on campus radio and providing many significant bands, including Shadowy Men on a Shadowy Planet, Cowboy Junkies, The Gruesomes, and Jerry Jerry and the Sons of Rhythm Orchestra, with their first major national exposure. Although no longer widely available, the compilations remain widely remembered as an important historical milestone in Canadian music as one of the first major efforts to actively promote alternative rock bands nationwide.

The compilations attracted some attention from international campus radio as well.

The Og label was disbanded in 1990, ending the compilation series.

The It Came From Canada Archive is a web archive of rare and relatively unknown Canadian music. It covers other genres and has no relation to the Og Music compilations.

== Track listings ==
=== Volume 1 (1985) ===
It Came from Canada, Vol. 1

Compilation album by various artists
- Released: 1985
- Genre: Alternative rock
- Label: Og Music

1. Jerry Jerry and the Sons of Rhythm Orchestra, "Radical Look/Bad Idea"
2. The Dusty Chaps, "Yukon Buddy"
3. Ray Condo and His Hard Rock Goners, "Rock Island Line"
4. Chris Houston, "Surfin' on Heroin"
5. Deja Voodoo, "Lonely Motel/House of Dr. Stimuli"
6. The Enigmas, "Bad Meat"
7. U.I.C., "2 + 2 = ?"
8. The Gruesomes, "For All I Care"
9. Terminal Sunglasses, "Antenna Dilemma/Don't Be Doing it in Front of the Penguins"
10. The Calamity Janes, "Lorna of the Jungle"
11. My Dog Popper, "Acid Flashback"

=== Volume 2 (1986) ===
It Came from Canada, Vol. 2

Compilation album by various artists
- Released: 1986
- Genre: Alternative rock
- Label: Og Music

1. Ray Condo & His Hard Rock Goners, "High Voltage"
2. Condition, "Ghost Train"
3. Undertakin' Daddies, "There Walked a Stranger"
4. The Dundrells, "Mr. Nasty"
5. Chris Houston, "Girls Are Swell"
6. E.J. Brulé, "Strange Consolation"
7. Deja Voodoo, "Three Men, One Coffin"
8. The Gruesomes, "What's Your Problem?"
9. Zamboni Drivers, "Skatin' Ghost"
10. Ten Commandments, "Feel It"
11. Electric Bananas, "Mikey is a Ladies' Man"
12. Guilt Parade, "Ode to an Asshole"
13. U.I.C., "Nashville Dreamin'"
14. Shadowy Men on a Shadowy Planet, "Good Cop Bad Cop"
15. Maggot Fodder, "Summer's End"

=== Volume 3 (1987) ===
It Came from Canada, Vol. 3

Compilation album by various artists
- Released: 1987
- Genre: Alternative rock
- Label: Og Music

1. The Dik Van Dykes, "Curling"
2. Ray Condo & His Hard Rock Goners, "Jumps, Giggles and Shouts"
3. The Stingin' Hornets, "Hornet Hive Hop"
4. Condition, "Hound Dog"
5. The Mongols, "Sleepwalk"
6. House of Knives, "Death Museum"
7. Deja Voodoo, "Bound for Glory"
8. The Gruesomes, "Your Lies"
9. The Ten Commandments, "Not True"
10. Color Me Psycho, "Black Corvair"
11. Guilt Parade, "The Todd Incident"
12. Jerry Jerry and the Sons of Rhythm Orchestra, "Yap Yap"
13. E.J. Brulé, "Killer Whale Attack"
14. Chris Houston, "Baby Jesus Looks Like Elvis"
15. Bagg Team, "Flip, Flip, Flip"

=== Volume 4 (1988) ===
It Came from Canada, Vol. 4

Compilation album by various artists
- Released: 1988
- Genre: Alternative rock
- Label: Og Music

1. The Dik Van Dykes, "Beachcombers"
2. Color Me Psycho, "What's Your Phobia?"
3. Bagg Team, "Twentieth Century Dog-Faced Boy"
4. Shadowy Men on a Shadowy Planet, "Faster, Santa Claus, Ho Ho Ho"
5. E.J. Brulé, "Tabarnak! Make My Day"
6. Hell's Half Acre, "United States of Canada"
7. House of Knives, "Be Cool"
8. Deja Voodoo, "I Wish That Cat Would Shut Up"
9. The Gruesomes, "I Try"
10. Sons of the Desert, "Balm of the Gilead"
11. Tongue 'n Groove, "Music Interlude"
12. Fluid Waffle, "The Other Side"
13. Cowboy Junkies, "Blue Moon Revisited (Song for Elvis)"
14. Dead Cats, "Tough Enough"
15. Zamboni Drivers, "Love's Made a Fool of You"
16. Salmon Breath, "Cadillac"

=== Volume 5 (1989) ===
It Came from Canada, Vol. 5

Compilation album by various artists
- Released: 1989
- Genre: Alternative rock
- Label: Og Music

1. The Dik Van Dykes, "Chain Letter Massacre"
2. Gordie Gordo & the G-Men, "Catch a Cow"
3. The Desmonds, "Bureaucrat from Hell"
4. Ulterior Motive, "Haunted House"
5. Chris Houston, "Stupid TV Christians"
6. The Vindicators, "You're Too Much"
7. Hard Rock Miners, "Third Person"
8. House of Knives, "It Came from Cambridge"
9. Deja Voodoo, "Let Elvis Die"
10. The Gruesomes, "You Weren't Using Your Head"
11. The Stand GT, "Cool as Me"
12. Ripcordz, "Long Dark Train"
13. U.I.C., "Lite It'n'Fly"
14. Supreme Bagg Team, "If You Could Read My Mind"
15. 64 Funnycars, "Boathouse"
16. Captain Crunch and Let's Do Lunch, "That Tune"
