= The Rock n Roll Rats =

- Origin: Vancouver, British Columbia, Canada
- Genres: Punk rock Disco
- Years active: 2009–Now Its Over
- Members: Johnny Forgotten; Jesse Death; Conor Smith
- Past members: Jason Parrott
- Website: therocknrollrats.com

The Rock n Roll Rats are a Canadian punk rock group formed in 2009 in Calgary, Alberta. The Rock n Roll Rats are influenced by punk rock bands including The Ramones, The Forgotten Rebels, Teenage Head, and The Misfits. This pop-punk quad plays three and four chord songs in a medium tempo and often puts the "hook" to their songs out front and centre. The Rock n Roll Rats do not align themselves with any specific ideologies or political views, instead writing songs about their love for punk rock.

== History ==
The Rock n Roll Rats formed in late 2009 with members Johnny Forgotten (guitar, vocals), Jesse Death (bass, backup vocals), and Conor Smith (drums). The band's first live performance was for Phil Bunton's wedding, held at The Old Motorcycle Shop (Calgary, Alberta). As a three piece, they independently recorded and released their first full-length LP at The Beach studios in Calgary. To promote the new LP, they played numerous gigs in and out of their hometown before achieving any notoriety. Their debut LP was officially released on iTunes and other mainstream retailers in 2010. The band has recorded a second release that includes 10 new original songs written and composed by Johnny Forgotten and Jesse Death as well as a cover of "Rock n' Roll's a Hard Life" by The Forgotten Rebels, which also appears on The Forgotten Rebels tribute CD. Their 2013 release comprises five original songs written by Johnny Forgotten and features Richie Ramone, who played drums for The Ramones from 1983–1987.

Since their inception, The Rock n Roll Rats have played shows with a number of notable bands including: C.J. Ramone, The Creepshow, The Raygun Cowboys, The Nailheads, and The Intensives.

== Members ==
- Johnny Forgotten – guitar, vocals
- Jesse Death – bass, backing vocals
- Conor Smith – drums

Johnny Forgotten has been active in punk rock bands since 1993. In 1996, he fronted the band Smash the State, which received some local attention. The band released a cassette titled Your Logo Here, appeared on The Mobile Music Machine (a cable television showcase), and was featured on a compilation CD released by OMAC (Original Music Association of Calgary).

Jesse Death wrote the single Coffin Love and remains a key original member of the band. He is also noted for using a 1993 Buick hearse as his primary means of transportation.

Conor Smith, the band's drummer, was nicknamed "John Connor" by his bandmates, in reference to the protagonist of the Terminator film series. Smith and Death are long-time friends who attended school together in Fort McMurray, Alberta, and previously played in several punk bands associated with the local music scene.

For a brief period, the band featured a second guitarist, Jay "Ramone" Parrott, from Thomaston, Georgia, United States, who later left due to family obligations. The band has not undergone any other lineup changes, and all current members are original members.

== Discography ==
- "Snot Rocket" – single (2010)
- The Rock n' Roll Rats – LP (2010)
- "Coffin Love" – single (2011)
- Canadian Punk Rock Born in 1977 (2012)
- The Rock n' Roll Rats with Richie Ramone – EP (2013), featuring Richie Ramone on drums
- "Rock & Roll's a Hard Life" and "Underwear" – contributions to the first and only official Forgotten Rebels tribute CD (2012)
- Sick of the City – LP (2013)
