= Deja Voodoo (Canadian band) =

Canadian garage rock band

- A Deja Voodoo ticket from 1986

Background information
- Origin: Montreal, Quebec, Canada
- Genres: Alternative, Garage Rock, Lo-fi
- Years active: 1981–1990
- Label: Og Music
- Past members: Gerard van Herk; Tony Dewald
- Website: Deja Voodoo

Deja Voodoo was a Canadian garage rock band, formed by Gerard van Herk (guitar and singing) and Tony Dewald (drums), who combined 1950s horror imagery with rockabilly and country musical influences. Van Herk's guitar only had the top four strings and he sang in a deep voice, whilst Dewald's drum kit had no cymbals, which resulted in a low-treble rock style they termed "sludgeabilly." The band toured in Canada, the United States, and even Europe.

== Early days ==
Both born in the 1960s, van Herk and Dewald each grew up in Montreal. In 1981, the two joined together to form Deja Voodoo. Their music generally consisted of short songs influenced by rockabilly and punk artists. As Deja Voodoo was embarking on its first performances, Montreal was receiving an influx of immigrants from Western Canada, and independent record labels were starting to spring up. In turn, numerous niche bands began to appear across the city. As a result of an oversaturated market, Deja Voodoo struggled to find an audience in its first year. While they remained popular locally in Montreal, it wasn't until 1982 that the two-man band began to see interest outside of Quebec, particularly in Toronto.

== Career ==
The turning point for Deja Voodoo came with van Herk and Dewald launching Og Music in 1982 with a second pressing of their debut single "Monsters in My Garage." Named after a fictional caveman, the independent label allowed for Deja Voodoo to control its own distribution. The first full-length release by Og Records was their cassette Gumbo. The tape sold relatively well in the Montreal independent scene, but failed to penetrate the market in the rest of Canada. This would later be rectified with the release of Deja Voodoo's second album, Cemetery, in 1984. Cemetery was the first Deja Voodoo album to be sold in vinyl form, selling widely across Canada and even to some small [stores?] in the US and Europe. The band used Og Records as a venue for like-minded artists to release music that reflected the "sludgeabilly" attitude in different styles. They released compilation LPs in the It Came from Canada series. Five volumes were released between 1985 and 1989. The compilations always included other Montrealers, like Jerry Jerry and the Sons of Rhythm Orchestra, Terminal Sunglasses, and The Gruesomes, as well as bands from all across Canada. In its seven-year lifespan, Og Records released 29 albums, the last of which was a recording of a Deja Voodoo performance in Finland.

Once Og Records took off, Deja Voodoo started touring across Canada. At first focusing on Ontario and Eastern Canada, they later branched out to Western Canada, going as far as Prince George, British Columbia. Deja Voodoo was able to embark on several European tours, primarily in Greece and Finland. In Canada, they did manage to get semi-regular airplay on CBC Radio's overnight Brave New Waves program. As Deja Voodoo's popularity grew and other bands continued to sign on with Og Records, van Herk and Dewald started putting on popular indoor events each December, called "Voodoo BBQ's". The last Voodoo BBQ was held in Toronto in 2008 as a kind of reunion show.

Despite their relative success, Deja Voodoo never managed to break into the mainstream markets, and by 1990 both van Herk and Dewald decided to split up Deja Voodoo. Both men had reached their thirties and were interested in pursuing other careers. As well, both members decided to sell Og Records that same year. Van Herk went on to become a university linguistics professor, a position he kept until his retirement in 2019. Dewald worked as a brewer on the West Coast, and became the head brewer at the successful Trading Post Brewing in Langley, British Columbia.

Dewald died of cancer on August 29, 2024. Earlier in 2024, Gerard announced on the band's Facebook page that they had signed a contract with the Montreal label Return to Analog Records to reissue their first five albums. On 11 April 2026, van Herk played a set of Deja Voodoo songs with Bloodshot Bill to celebrate the re-release of Cemetary (1984) for record store day 2026.

In 2011, Mark Davis and Lorrie Matheson collaborated on a cover of Deja Voodoo's "Too Cool to Live, Too Smart to Die" for the first Have Not Been the Same charity compilation.

== Discography ==
=== Albums ===
- Cemetery (1984) (Og Music)
- Too Cool to Live, Too Smart to Die (1985) (Midnight Records)
- Swamp of Love (1986) (Og Music)
- The Worst of Deja Voodoo (1987) (Og Music)
- Gotta Have Money (1987) (Gaga Goodies)
- Big Pile of Mud (1988) (Og Music)
- Too Cool to Live, Too Smart to Die (88 re-recordings) (1988) (Og Records)
- Live at The Backstage Club, Helsinki Finland (1989) (Gaga Goodies and Og Music)

=== Singles ===
- "Monsters in My Garage" (1982) (Og Music)
- "Cemetery" (1984) (Og Music)
- "Hiekkaa Hietarannan" (1988) (Gaga Goodies)

=== Cassettes ===
- "Gumbo, 17 Sludgeabilly Greats!" (1983) (Og Music)

=== Appearances on compilations ===
- From Montreal (1983)
- It Came from Canada, Vol. 1 (1985) (Og Music)
- It Came from Canada, Vol. 2 (1986) (Og Music)
- It Came from Canada, Vol. 3 (1987) (Og Music)
- It Came from Canada, Vol. 4 (1988) (Og Music)
- It Came from Canada, Vol. 5 (1989) (Og Music)
- On Garde Reargarde Magazine 14 Montreal Bands (1989) (Cargo Records)
- 50th birthday tribute to Buddy Holly (1986) cassette (hipocket records)

=== Music videos ===
- The House of Doctor Stimuli
- White Sugar
