= It Came from Canada Archive =

The It Came From Canada Archive was an online archive of rare, long-lost, and relatively unknown Canadian music, created by Beau Levitt and Kevin McGowan in 2007.

== Naming ==
The name of the It Came From Canada Archive was inspired by, but has no relation to, Og Music's It Came from Canada compilations.

An independent project, without any corporate or government funding, itcamefromcanada was created as a place for recording artists (or their families) and fans to find their old LP records online, listed with some biographical information, if any is available.

== Overview ==
The site featured many artists that may never have had any exposure outside of their own communities, or even outside of their own homes. Levitt and McGowan find these LPs on their travels across Canada, and document them as best they can, and offer MP3 samples so fans can hear their favourite old songs.

The site was supported by many of the artists it has documented, and many provide additional biographical information to expand the articles.
