= Christina Leslie =

Christina Leslie may refer to:

- Christina Leslie (photographer) (born 1983) Canadian-Jamaican photographer
- Christina S. Leslie, Canadian-American computational biologist
