= The Dik Van Dykes =

Canadian garage rock band

- Also known as: DVDs
- Origin: Hamilton, Ontario, Canada
- Genres: Garage punk, comedy rock
- Years active: 1985–1989
- Labels: Og Records
- Past members: Sarah Hodgson; Steve Hoy; Mike "Dik" Johnson; Stu Smith; Frank Viola; Blurt Van Dyke; Renee Wetselaar
- Website: Myspace page

The Dik Van Dykes were a garage punk sextet based in Hamilton, Ontario, Canada who first formed in 1985 and folded in 1989.

They released two albums, Nobody Likes...The Dik Van Dykes (1987), and Waste Mor Vinyl (1989), on the Og Records label, preceded by a limited edition indie cassette, Live At the Gown and Gavel... and countless compilation records such as the It Came from Canada series issued by OG Records (the Deja Voodoo guys).

Most of the Dik Van Dykes' songs were humorous in nature, often satirizing local and Canadian culture. "Curling", "Birthday Song" and "Adult Gumby" were fan favorites. The band received significant airplay on McMaster University's CFMU-FM 93.3, Memorial University of Newfoundland's CHMR 93.5, and many other student-run radio stations.

They opened for Ramones on three nights in 1988, and played with other great bands of the era such as Shadowy Men on a Shadowy Planet, UIC, Wetspots, Heimlich Maneuver, and Deja Voodoo.

In the 1990s, Sarah Hodgson asked Mike (Dik) Johnson to join her band, Sinister Dude Ranch. He accepted, but with one condition, that the band change its name to "I Love My Shih Tzu". The band's first song was actually a Dik Van Dykes song, "Too Much Like Fun". The band broke up in the early 21st century.
