= The Enigmas =

Background information
- Origin: Vancouver, British Columbia, Canada
- Genre: Flower Punk / garage rock
- Years active: 1982-1986; sporadically thereafter
- Label: Zulu
- Past members: Cam Beck; Randy Bowman; Mike Davies; Stephen Hamm; Paul McKenzie; Brian Olinek; Adam Payne

The Enigmas are a Canadian garage rock band formed in Vancouver, British Columbia, in 1981. Although initially short-lived, the band is still renowned for its live performances, showcasing a style combining influences from 1960s garage rock and Detroit's proto-punk scene. In the mid-1980s, the Enigmas released two EPs, appeared on the cult classic compilation album It Came from Canada, Vol. 1 and the compilation album It Came From The Pit. Following their disbandment, the group continues to reunite for occasional shows.

Paul McKenzie (lead vocals saxophone), Mike Davies (lead guitar) and Brian Olinek (bass guitar) originally came together in Vancouver's blossoming punk rock scene with a shared interest in garage rock and sixties instrumentals. At first, they busked outside liquor stores as the Bone-a-Partes. However, when the band discovered a French garage rock act had already appropriated the name, McKenzie suggested renaming themselves the Enigmas. In March 1982, they hired Cam Beck (drums) and the band played their debut gig at the Smilin' Buddha with the Greasy Spoons, one of McKenzie's former groups.

During the peak of their popularity, the Enigmas were one of the most frequented attractions in Vancouver's underground music scene. The group developed a blend of garage rock and Detroit proto-punk sensibilities with a repertoire that encompassed cover versions of classic 1960s garage songs by the 13th Floor Elevators, the Sonics, and the Balloon Farm among others, as well as some self-penned material. In concert, the Enigmas' act was highlighted by frontman McKenzie's high-energy theatrics, having adopted a similar style to Iggy Pop. Beck left the band in May 1982, but was replaced by veteran drummer Randy Bowman, who arrived shortly after his former group, the Subhumans, disbanded.

By late 1982, the Enigmas began touring into Alberta, Saskatchewan, and Manitoba, garnering a wider following as the group performed in front of new audiences. The band self-produced a five-song, eponymous EP in 1983, which included unusually high-quality production and the cult-favorite track Teenage Barnacle. More of a "learning process" than a serious project, the Enigmas were eager to record another EP. After touring the West Coast they recorded Strangely Wild in 1985, after enticing Zulu Records to release the record. To promote the release, the Enigmas toured out to Montreal with NoMeansNo and appeared on the compilation albums It Came from Canada, Vol. 1 and It Came From The Pit. However, by 1986 after Olinek left the band the group disbanded to work on other projects including The Scramblers, Earthling and TT Racer.

As early as 1987, the Enigmas performed reunion gigs with the original recording line-up. By 1989, a new song about Charles Manson recorded to tape at rehearsal was released on Nardwuar The Human Serviette's compilation Oh God, My Mom's On Channel 10!. In 1992, McKenzie formed the successful Celtic punk band the Real Mckenzies. In 2010, the Enigmas reunited without Olinek, who had relocated, but with Stephen Hamm (Slow, Tankhog) on bass and released a live album of the show on DVD.

More reunions followed, including a DVD release party in 2014 and the Khatsahlano Festival Main Stage in 2015, with Adam Payne from The Badbeats on bass. More shows were planned for the fall of 2019.
