= Jerry Jerry and the Sons of Rhythm Orchestra =

Canadian alternative rock band

- Origin: Edmonton, Alberta, Canada
- Genres: Alternative rock
- Years active: 1982–2005
- Labels: Og Music; Pipeline Records; Aquarius Records
- Members: Jerry Woods; Paul Soulodre; Blake Cheetah; George Wall; Duke Bronfman
- Website: www.jerryjerry.ca

Jerry Jerry and the Sons of Rhythm Orchestra is a Canadian alternative rock band whose musical style blends elements of surf music, gospel music, rockabilly, garage, and punk. The band also experimented with jazz on their third album Don't Mind If I Do.

== History ==
Jerry Jerry and the Sons of Rhythm Orchestra was formed in 1982 by lead singer Jerry Woods in Edmonton, Alberta. Starting out as what Jerry described as a "fuck band," after time they found themselves becoming a serious local act, prompting them to release their first independent EP Fighting Socialism in 1984. The band released their first album Road Gore: The Band That Drank Too Much in 1985 under Og Music. They moved from Edmonton to Montreal in 1986 where they signed with Pipeline Records, along with such acts as the Doughboys and Ray Condo and his Hardrock Goners.

In 1987, they released their critically acclaimed follow-up Battle Hymn of the Apartment. Pipeline Records soon fell into bankruptcy, and in 1990 they were signed to Aquarius Records, re-releasing both Road Gore and Battle Hymn of the Apartment on CD. This marked the apex of their commercial success, prompting them to tour North America throughout the early 1990s. After the production of two more albums, 1992's Don't Mind If I Do and 1997's The Sound and The Jerry, Jerry Woods moved back to Edmonton in 1999 with his wife and five children.

The band continued to play until 2005. As of late 2010, Jerry plays with a punk rock cover band named "Spartans" including original guitarist Paul Soulodre, as well as Kevin Forbes, Craig Shemely, and former SNFU bassist Dave Bacon.

Battle Hymn of the Apartment was rated No. 74 on Chart's Top 100 Canadian Albums of All Time reader poll in 1996.

== Discography ==
=== EPs ===
- Fighting Socialism (cassette 1984)

=== Albums ===
- Road Gore: The Band That Drank Too Much (1985)
- Battle Hymn of the Apartment (1987)
- Don't Mind If I Do (1992)
- The Sound and The Jerry (1997)

=== Appearances on compilations ===
- It Came from Canada, Vol. 1 (1985)
- It Came from Canada, Vol. 3 (1987)
