= The Worst of Deja Voodoo =

Studio album by Deja Voodoo
- Recorded: 1987
- Genre: Garage rock
- Length: 36:29
- Label: Og Music

Deja Voodoo chronology
Swamp of Love (1986)	The Worst of Deja Voodoo (1987)	Big Pile of Mud (1988)

Professional ratings
Review scores
Source	Rating
Allmusic	4.5/5 stars

The Worst of Deja Voodoo is a collection of singles, outtakes and oddities by the Canadian garage rock band Deja Voodoo.

== Track listing ==
1. Monsters in My Garage
2. More Songs About Monsters and Food
3. Feed That Thing
4. Surfing on Mars
5. Bullfrog
6. Duh Papa Duh
7. Driving on Drugs
8. Rock Therapy
9. Night Time
10. Surfer Joe
11. Phantom Skateboarder
12. I Wanna Come Back from the World of LSD
13. Vegetables
14. Vang Gogh's Ear
15. Baby Honey
16. If You're So Smart
17. Boppin' 88
18. Peace, Love and Flowers
19. Sigmund Freud
20. Oh Yeah
21. Wall of Paisley
22. Lizard!
23. Into the Gumbo
24. Raised By Wolves

== Personnel ==
- Tony Dewald, drums
- Gerard van Herk, guitar/voice

== Influences and Inspirations ==
Deja Voodoo are known for their extensive liner notes, showing their encyclopedic knowledge of music from the Fifties, the Sixties and the Seventies:

"Here are some of the folks the Vodoo cats have gotten larcenous with this time: Jan and Dean, Tornados, Shangri-Las, Mickey & Sylvia, Diamonds, Hasil Adkins, Gun Club, Big Joe Turner, Screamin' Jay Hawkins, Elvis Presley, Monkees, Beach Boys, Surfaris, Hank Mizell, Bobby "Boris" Pickett, Undertones, Little Richard, Coasters, Rock-a-Teens, Johnny Burnette's Rock and Roll Trio, Cramps, The Fee-Fi-Four Plus Two, Butthole Surfers, Marcels, Strangeloves, Sonics, Barett Strongs, Everly Brothers, Muppets, and Jackie Brenston." (Quoted from the album's sleeve)
