= Christina Leslie (photographer) =

Canadian-Jamaican photographer

Christina Leslie is a Canadian-Jamaican photographer living in Pickering, Canada born in 1983. Her works focuses on depicting Black narratives, decolonization, and exploring West Indian heritage. Her work Sugar Coat uses sugar as part of the photographic process.

== Education ==
Leslie studied for a BFA at OCAD University in Toronto in 2006, and was received an MFA in 2022 by Savannah College of Art and Design in Georgia, USA.

== Photographic practice and works ==
Leslie was one of four contemporary artists whose work was curated in the 2010 exhibition, "Position As Desired /Exploring African Canadian Identity", at the Royal Ontario Museum, alongside 26 historical works spanning 1896 to 2008.

For her project "Sugar Coat" (2021), Leslie developed a photographic process which involves "specialized paper and sugar solution that becomes an photograph", with the development process taking four days.

Leslie curated and wrote introductory text for the McMaster School of the Arts graduate show in 2024.

Her solo show, "Likkle Acts", was curated by Hannah Keating at the Robert McLaughlin Gallery in 2025.

A notable show was The Wedge Collection Dancing in the Light at Museum of Contemporary Art Toronto in Toronto, ON in 2023
