= Mark Davis (Canadian musician) =

Canadian singer-songwriter

Mark Davis is a Canadian singer-songwriter from Edmonton, Alberta. He is most noted for his 2011 album Eliminate the Toxins, which was a longlisted nominee for the 2012 Polaris Music Prize.

Originally associated with the alternative country band Old Reliable, he released two concurrent solo albums, Mistakes I Meant to Make and Don't You Think We Should Be Closer?, in 2007. Eliminate the Toxins followed in 2011; in the same year, Davis and Lorrie Matheson collaborated on a cover of Deja Voodoo's "Too Cool to Live, Too Smart to Die" for the first Have Not Been the Same charity compilation.

Since the release of Eliminate the Toxins, Davis has collaborated with Sean Picard in the synthpop duo Concealer, who released their debut album feted:fetid in 2015.
