= Cemetery (album) =

Studio album by Deja Voodoo
- Released: 1984
- Recorded: November 1983
- Genre: Garage rock
- Label: Og Music
- Producer: Pete Moss

Deja Voodoo chronology
Cemetery (1984)	Too Cool to Live, Too Smart to Die (1985)

Professional ratings
Review scores
Source	Rating
Allmusic	3/5 stars

Cemetery is the first studio album by the Canadian garage rock band Deja Voodoo. The album was recorded in Studio Secret, save for the title track, which was recorded "in Bob's basement".

== Track listing ==
1. "Things with You"
2. "Big Scary Daddy"
3. "Skeleton at My Party"
4. "If Mashed Potatoes"
5. "Long Tall Texan"
6. "How Can I Miss You"
7. "Kill Kill Kill"
8. "I Better Think"
9. "Voodoo Barbecue"
10. "Metro Vers L'enfer"
11. "Crocodile Tears"
12. "Buy Insurance"
13. "Eager Beaver Baby"
14. "Cemetery"
15. "Strange"
16. "Jungle Out There"
17. "Stop"
18. "Wormtown"
19. "16 Tons"

== Personnel ==
- Tony Dewald, drums
- Gerard van Herk, guitar/voice
