= Big Pile of Mud =

Studio album by Deja Voodoo
- Released: 1988
- Recorded: 1988
- Genre: Garage rock
- Label: Og Music

Deja Voodoo chronology
The Worst of Deja Voodoo (1987)	Big Pile of Mud (1988)	Live at The Backstage Club, Helsinki Finland (1989)

Professional ratings
Review scores
Source	Rating
AllMusic	3.5/5 stars

Big Pile of Mud is an LP release by the Canadian garage-rock band Deja Voodoo. It would be their last release recorded in a studio.

There is a Greek version released by Didi Records that includes two bonus tracks: "Waiting for the Man," a Velvet Underground cover, and "I Wish That Cat Would Shut Up."

== Production ==
The band recorded the album for less than $150.

== Critical reception ==
AllMusic wrote that "there is more of a relaxed feel on this album ... On the opening track, Gerard Van Herk sings about his girlfriend in true sludgebilly style, and elsewhere cuts down people who wear brown leather jackets or charge exorbitant prices for import albums."

== Track listing ==
1. My Girlfriend
2. Big Pile of Mud
3. Call Link Wray
4. (Some Things Just Don't) Wash Off
5. Monsters in My Garage Got Married
6. Gonna Kill Somebody
7. Stuff and Things
8. Brown Leather Jacket
9. A Million Pieces
10. Big Ending!
11. 48 Bucks
12. Yeye
13. Dodge Veg-o-matic
14. Beat Me to the Lunch
15. Red Garlic Shoes
16. Weird World
17. Espresso Bongo
18. Polk Salad Annie

== Personnel ==
- Tony Dewald, drums
- Gerard van Herk, guitar/voice
