= Chris Houston (musician) =

- Born: Hamilton, Ontario, Canada

Chris Houston is a Canadian punk rock musician and songwriter, who was in the band the Forgotten Rebels in the late 1970s. He co-wrote "Surfin' on Heroin", one of the band's most famous songs.

Following the band's album This Ain't Hollywood, he left to pursue a solo career. He recorded songs for four of the five It Came from Canada compilation albums, including a solo rendition of "Surfin' on Heroin". He released his solo debut Chris Houston and the Sex Machine domestically as a vinyl LP in 1986 on label Caucasian Records. On cassette tape, he released Hate Filled Man in 1987 on Caucasian-Driveway Records.

He lived in Vancouver, British Columbia, for some time, working as a writer for the CBC Television teen series Pilot One, and now lives and performs in his hometown of Hamilton, Ontario.

== See also ==
- Music of Canada
- Canadian punk rock
- List of Canadian musicians
