= Swamp of Love =

Studio album by Deja Voodoo
- Released: 1986
- Recorded: July 30–31, 1986, Og Studios
- Genre: Garage rock
- Label: Og

Deja Voodoo chronology
Too Cool to Live, Too Smart to Die (1985)	Swamp of Love (1986)	The Worst of Deja Voodoo (1987)

Professional ratings
Review scores
Source	Rating
Allmusic	4.5/5 stars

Swamp of Love is the third studio album released by the Canadian garage rock band Deja Voodoo.

== Track listing ==
1. "Blast Off!"
2. "Endless Sleep"
3. "New Kind of Mambo"
4. "Pig Fat Papa"
5. "Place I Live"
6. "White Sugar"
7. "Wasn't That a Fish"
8. "Love Me Now"
9. "Shoobedy Hey"
10. "Coelecanth" [sic]
11. "Three Men, One Coffin"
12. "Swamp of Love"
13. "Baby Please Don't Go"
14. "Cat That's Gone to the Dogs"
15. "Black Dress"
16. "Bad Book"
17. "Carfish"
18. "Stuff"
19. "Dead Daddy Dead"
20. "Where I've Been (Tonight)"
21. "Don't Let No Ning Heads in Your Home"
22. "Viet Cong"

Source Carruthers.

== Personnel ==
- Tony Dewald, drums
- Gerard van Herk, guitar/voice
