= Too Cool to Live, Too Smart to Die =

Studio album by Deja Voodoo
- Released: 1985
- Recorded: 1985
- Genre: Garage rock
- Label: Midnight Records/Og Music

Deja Voodoo chronology
Cemetery (1984)	Too Cool to Live, Too Smart to Die (1985)	Swamp of Love (1986)

Professional ratings
Review scores
Source	Rating
AllMusic	4.5/5 stars

Too Cool to Live, Too Smart to Die is a mini-LP by the Canadian garage rock band Deja Voodoo, released by the American label Midnight Records in 1985. It was reissued in 1988 on the band's label, Og Music, with "dirt-floor mix" remastering, an additional song ("Lonely Motel") and a slightly different track list order.

== Track listing ==
All songs written by Gerard Van Herk, unless otherwise indicated.
1985 Midnight Records release

Side One
No.	Title	Length
1.	"Too Cool to Live, Too Smart to Die"	1:46
2.	"Take Out the Trash"	1:55
3.	"Gotta Have Money"	2:20
4.	"Bo Diddley's Cat"	2:19

Side Two
No.	Title	Writer(s)	Length
5.	"Down in Mexico"	Jerry Lieber/Mike Stoller	2:18
6.	"Cheese & Crackers"	Hayden Thompson	3:12
7.	"Bugs for Christmas"		0:47
8.	"The House of Dr. Stimuli"		2:06

1988 Og Music release

Side One
No.	Title	Length
1.	"Too Cool to Live, Too Smart to Die"
2.	"Take Out the Trash"
3.	"Gotta Have Money"
4.	"Bugs for Christmas"
5.	"Bo Diddley's Cat"

Side Two
No.	Title	Writer(s)	Length
6.	"Down in Mexico"	Jerry Lieber/Mike Stoller
7.	"Cheese & Crackers"	Hayden Thompson
8.	"Lonely Motel"
9.	"The House of Dr. Stimuli"

== Personnel ==
- Tony Dewald - Drums, stomping feet on "Gotta Have Money"
- Gerard Van Herk - Guitar, voice
