= Have Not Been the Same =

Book and related compilation albums

- Both editions (2001 & 2011)
- Author: Michael Barclay, Ian A. D. Jack, Jason Schneider
- Publication date: 2001
- ISBN: 1-55022-475-1

Have Not Been the Same: The Can-Rock Renaissance 1985–1995 is a book by Canadian music journalists Michael Barclay, Ian A.D. Jack, and Jason Schneider, which chronicles the development of alternative rock in Canada between 1985 and 1995. Published by ECW Press, the book has appeared in two editions, an original in 2001 (ISBN 1-55022-475-1) and an updated tenth anniversary edition in 2011 (ISBN 978-1-55022-992-9). In conjunction with the 2011 edition of the book, two compilation albums of music from the era chronicled by the book were also released as fundraisers for charitable organizations.

The book is named for a 1985 single by Slow, a Vancouver-based punk rock band.

== Content ==
The book includes chapters devoted specifically to the roles of Blue Rodeo, The Tragically Hip, Sloan, Daniel Lanois and Nettwerk Records, as well as other chapters which take a thematic approach to profile a number of artists related by either geography or genre. An early chapter is also devoted to the role of music media such as CBC Radio's Brave New Waves and Night Lines, campus radio and MuchMusic.

The 2011 edition included a new epilogue which touched on the ways in which the era chronicled in the book impacted on the Canadian indie rock boom of the early 2000s.

== Compilation albums ==
=== Have Not Been the Same - Vol. 1: Too Cool to Live, Too Smart to Die ===
Released on November 15, 2011, Have Not Been the Same - Vol. 1: Too Cool to Live, Too Smart to Die features contemporary Canadian indie rock artists performing cover versions of songs from the period covered by the book. Proceeds from the album sales were donated to Toronto's Centre for Addiction and Mental Health.

1. The Burning Hell, "Pop Goes the World" (Men Without Hats)
2. Corb Lund, "In Contempt of Me" (Jr. Gone Wild)
3. Great Lake Swimmers, "What Was Going Through My Head" (The Grapes of Wrath)
4. Owl Mountain Radar, "Daylight" (The Nils)
5. Bry Webb, "I Will Give You Everything" (Skydiggers)
6. Forest City Lovers, "The Lines You Amend" (Sloan)
7. Light Fires, "Happens All the Time" (Eric's Trip)
8. Selina Martin with the Faceless Forces of Bigness, "Grace, Too" (The Tragically Hip)
9. Mark Davis and Lorrie Matheson, "Too Cool to Live, Too Smart to Die" (Deja Voodoo)
10. Jill Barber and Matthew Barber, "Your Sunshine" (The Hardship Post)
11. Cuff the Duke, "North Window" (The Inbreds)
12. The Hidden Cameras, "Throw Silver" (Mecca Normal)
13. Snailhouse, "Buddah" (Al Tuck)
14. Veda Hille, "Odette" (©)
15. Andrew Vincent, "Teenland" (Northern Pikes)
16. Geoff Berner, "Bound for Vegas" (Art Bergmann)
17. Neil Haverty, "Shaved Head" (Rheostatics)
18. Richard Reed Parry and Little Scream, "When You Know Why You’re Happy" (Mary Margaret O'Hara)
19. Kevin Drew, "We Got Time" (Bob Wiseman)

=== Have Not Been the Same ===
Released in 2012, the second compilation album features rare and unreleased material by artists from the original era, including the song from which the book takes its name. Proceeds from the album sales were donated to Kids Help Phone. In addition, artists including Blue Rodeo and Cowboy Junkies donated band memorabilia, and numerous corporate sponsors donated exclusive prizes, for a fundraising auction on eBay.

1. Slow, "Have Not Been the Same"
2. Poisoned with Art Bergmann, "Final Cliché"
3. NoMeansNo, "Dad"
4. The Nils, "In Betweens"
5. Doughboys, "Long Hall"
6. Rational Youth, "To the Goddess Electricity (2011 Mix)"
7. Jane Siberry, "Symmetry"
8. Hunger Project, "The Same Inside"
9. The Pursuit of Happiness, "Wake Up and Smell Cathy"
10. A Neon Rome, "Shatter the Illusions"
11. Change of Heart, "Smile"
12. Jr. Gone Wild, "God Is Not My Father"
13. Skydiggers, "When You're Down"
14. Crash Vegas, "Moving Too Fast"
15. 13 Engines, "Beached"
16. Weeping Tile, "Pushover"
17. The Grapes of Wrath, "Misunderstanding"
18. Sloan, "Lucky For Me"
19. Jale, "Jesus Loves Me"
20. Bob Wiseman, "Gabriel Dumont Blues"
