= Pilot One =

- Genre: Variety
- Created by: David Marsden
- Starring: Lossen Chambers; Karen Campbell; Stephen Coulson; Jacques Lalonde; Paula Rempel; Martin Cummins
- Country of origin: Canada
- No. of seasons: 1
- No. of episodes: 11

Production
- Production locations: Vancouver, British Columbia

Original release
- Network: CBC Television
- Release: January 13, 1989 – April 1989

Pilot One is a Canadian television variety program that aired in 1989 on CBC Television. A late-night series aimed at teenagers, the series mixed music, interviews, informational segments, commentary and comedy sketches.

Created by David Marsden after his departure from CFNY-FM, the series was originally planned to air five nights a week but was scaled back to a weekly series in advance of its premiere. It was taped in a studio converted from a warehouse space on the former Expo 86 site.

The show's hosts were Lossen Chambers, Karen Campbell, Stephen Coulson, Jacques Lalonde, Paula Rempel and Martin Cummins. Contributors to the program included punk musician Chris Houston as a writer, and sex educator Sue Johansen as host of a sex and relationship advice segment. The show's cancellation was announced on April 7, 1989 due to budgetary pressures at the CBC. Despite the cancellation, the series was later sold to BBC Two in the United Kingdom, where it provided popular exposure to musical guests such as The Pursuit of Happiness and Sarah McLachlan.

The series garnered a Gemini Award nomination for Best Variety Program or Series at the 4th Gemini Awards in 1989.
