= Ripcordz =

Canadian punk rock band

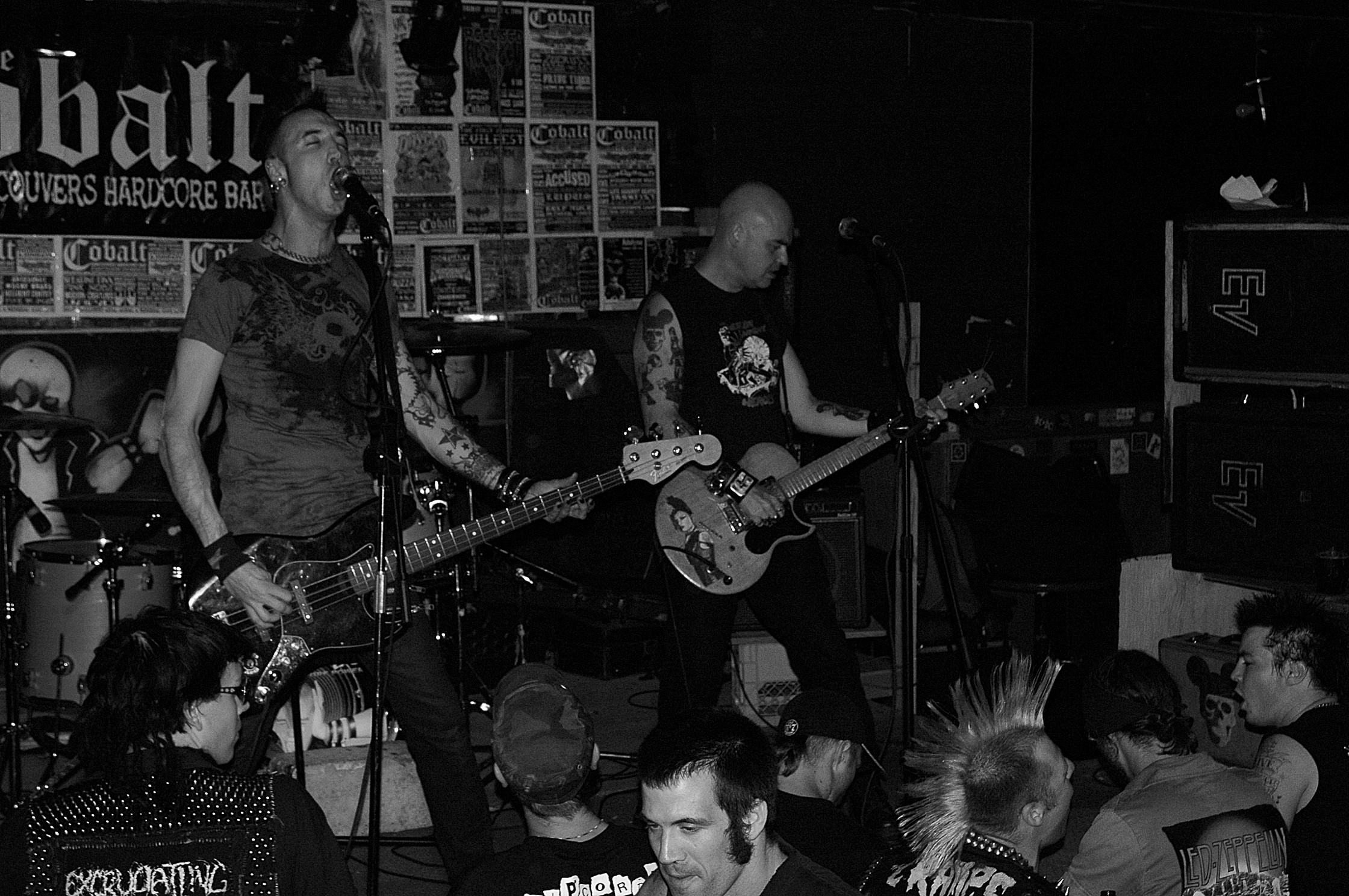
- Ripcordz live in Vancouver

Background information
- Origin: Montreal, Quebec, Canada
- Genre: Punk rock
- Years active: 1980–present
- Labels: Mayday Records; EnGuard Records; Og Records; Sudden Death Records
- Members: Paul Gott; Elliott Filion
- Past members: François Demers; Josh Taugher; Alexandre Gauthier; Ian Campeau; Simon Cloutier; Ian Hoss; John Isherwood; Danny Laflamme; Chris Moroz; Phil O'Neill; Alexandre Roy; Ian Swinson; Gopal D Emma Tibaldo; Joel Lebofsky
- Website: theripcordz.com/main.php

Ripcordz are a Canadian punk rock band, formed in Montreal in 1980. They have released 15 full-length albums and continue to tour extensively as a three-piece band.

The band has undergone numerous lineup changes through its history, with vocalist and guitarist Paul Gott as the only remaining original band member.

== History ==
The band was formed in 1980, playing their first show at Montreal's Le Steppe. Gott, at the time a journalism student at Concordia University, initially performed only on guitar, but took over as vocalist after the original vocalist sang the show in a vocal style more reminiscent of Robert Plant than punk rock.

The band released their debut album, Ripcordz Are Go(d), in 1988 on Og Records. After that label folded in 1990, Gott launched EnGuard Records, releasing the album A Right Is a Right that year. Gott simultaneously ran his own typesetting business.

In 1992, they released the albums There Ain't No 'H' in Ripcordz, Dork-Face and Kidnoise.

In 1994, the band released Canadian As Fuck. Later the same year, 12 bands contributed covers of the band's songs to the tribute album Ripcordz As Fuck. Around the same time as the tribute album's release, Ripcordz organized an all-ages show featuring 18 bands.

In 1998, the band released Is That a Squeegee In Your Pocket Or Are You Just Happy to See Me?, their first album to be released on another label since their debut. By this time, Gott was working as a news producer for Montreal television station CKMI. They have continued to release albums, including It's Never Too Late to Annoy Your Parents, I Went to the Summit of the Americas and All I Got Was This Lousy Tear Gas Canister in the Back of the Head, What If They Held a Revolution and Nobody Came?, 100,000 Watts of Pure Power (At Least That's What We Tell All the Girls), Double Your Punk, Double Your Fun, Dead or Alive in '92, Black, Made in Montreal and War on Xmas, as well as a reissue of Ripcordz Are Go(d) in 2004.

By the time of the band's 2014 album Made in Montreal, Gott was estimating that the band had played at least 3,000 shows across Canada. He was working at this time as a news producer for the local CBC News on CBMT.

== Band members ==
=== Current ===
- Paul Gott – 1980–present – vocals, guitar
- Elliott Fillion – 2025–present – drums, vocals

=== Former ===
- Josh Taugher 2021–2024 – drums
- Ian Hoss – 2023-2026 – bass, vocals
- François Demers – 1990–1999, 2003-2019 – drums, 2021–2024 – bass
- Alexandre Gauthier – 1999–2008, 2010–2012, 2016–2023 – bass, vocals
- Ian Campeau – 2002–2003 – drums
- Simon Cloutier – 1999–2001 – drums
- John Isherwood – 1991–1992 – bass
- Danny Laflamme – 1992–1995, 2008–2009 – bass
- Chris Moroz – 1995–1999 – bass
- Phil O'Neill – 1988–1990 – drums
- Alexandre Roy – 2012–2017 – drums
- Emma Tibaldo – 1989 - 1998 (approx); vocals
- Ian Swinson – 1988–1991 – bass

== Discography ==
=== Albums ===
- Greatest Hits (No Label, 1986)
- Ripcordz Are Go(d) (Og Music, 1988)
- There Ain't No 'H' in Ripcordz, Dork-Face (En Guard Records, 1992)
- Kidnoise (En Guard Records, 1992)
- Canadian as Fuck (En Guard Records, 1994)
- Shut Up and Pogo (En Guard Records, 1996)
- Your Mother Wears Army Boots, But Man She Looks So Cool (Nim Records, Positive Records, Disque Macadam, 1996)
- Is That a Squeegee In Your Pocket Or Are You Just Happy to See Me? (En Guard Productions, Underworld Records, 1998)
- It's Never Too Late to Annoy Your Parents (Sudden Death Records, 2000)
- What If They Held a Revolution and Nobody Came? (Mayday Records, 2003)
- 100,000 Watts of Pure Power (At Least That's What We Tell All the Girls) (Mayday Records, 2006)
- Black (Mayday Records, 2011)
- Made in Montreal (En Guard Records, 2014)
- Don't Buy the First Album, Jerk-Wad, Get This One! (En Guard Records, 2020)
- More Songs You'll Never Find on Spotify Because Fuck Those Guys (En Guard Records, 2025)

=== Singles, EPs, Splits ===
- A Right is a Right (Cassette EP, En Guard Records, 1990)
- Decision 93 (7" single, En Guard Records, 1993)
- The Bollweevils / Ripcordz (Split 7", Labyrinth Records, 1993)
- I Went to the Summit of the Americas and All I Got Was This Lousy Tear Gas Canister in the Back of the Head (CD EP, Teenage Rampage Records, 2002)
- Ripcordz / M.S.A (Split 7", En Guard Records, 2015)
- Fed Up: A Canadian Punk Rock Split (3-band split CD with Jack Spades, Destroilet; Bilderbergers, 2015)
- Punk East vs. Punk West (4-band split vinyl LP with Riot Porn, The Motherfuckers, Mandible Klaw; No Label, 2019)
- Fuck COVID (7" single, En Guard Records, 2021)

=== Compilations ===
- Re-Cordz (En Guard Records, 1995)
- Double Your Punk, Double Your Fun (Mayday Records, 2006)
- Dead or Alive in '92 (Mayday Records, 2007)
- The Vinyl Countdown / War On Christmas (2LP + 1 CD collection; En Guard Records, Stomp Records, 2017)
- Are You Feeling Lucky, Punk? (En Guard Records, 2026)
