= Og Music =

- Founded: 1983
- Founder: Tony Dewald; Gerard van Herk
- Genre: Garage punk
- Country of origin: Canada
- Location: Montreal, Quebec

Og Music was a small but influential independent record label based in Montreal, Quebec, Canada.

The label was established in 1983 by the band members of Deja Voodoo, Gerard van Herk and Tony Dewald. It ceased operations in 1990.

== History ==
The label started by putting out cassette-only releases, and soon began to release full vinyl LPs. As of 2007 none of these releases has ever been re-released on CD. In addition to releasing material from Deja Voodoo, the label was notable for giving early exposure to groups that would later go on to more mainstream success, such as Shadowy Men on a Shadowy Planet and Cowboy Junkies.

Their best selling albums were the It Came from Canada compilations, which featured tracks from many Canadian indie artists of the time — in all, five such compilations were released. None of the album releases made it to mainstream airplay, but regularly charted at various campus radio stations in Canada.

The label was retired when the band members of Deja Voodoo turned 30 and left the music business to pursue other careers.

The record label was named after a fictional caveman character called Og.

== Discography ==
- OG 1 - Deja Voodoo, Gumbo (Cassette - 1983)
- OG 2 - Condition, Dirty Business (Cassette - 1983)
- OG 3 - Various Artists, From Montreal (7" single - 1983)
- OG 4 - Deja Voodoo, Cemetery (LP - 1984)
- OG 5 - The Asexuals, Featuring the Asexuals (7" single - 1984)
- OG 6 - Terminal Sunglasses, Wrap Around Cool (LP - 1985)
- OG 7 - Jerry Jerry and the Sons of Rhythm Orchestra, Road Gore: The Band That Drank Too Much (LP - 1985)
- OG 8 - Various Artists, It Came from Canada, Vol. 1 (LP - 1985)
- OG 9 - Various Artists, It Came from Canada, Vol. 2 (LP - 1986)
- OG 10 - The Gruesomes, Tyrants of Teen Trash (LP - 1986)
- OG 11 - Deja Voodoo, Swamp of Love (LP - 1986)
- OG 12 - Deja Voodoo, Too Cool to Live, Too Smart to Die (LP - 1988)
- OG 13 - Various Artists, It Came from Canada, Vol. 3 (LP - 1987)
- OG 14 - Deja Voodoo, The Worst of... (LP - 1987)
- OG 15 - The Gruesomes, Gruesomania (LP - 1987)
- OG 16 - The Dik Van Dykes, Nobody Likes the Dik Van Dykes (LP - 1987)
- OG 17 - Various Artists, It Came from Canada, Vol. 4 (LP - 1988)
- OG 18 - Deja Voodoo, Big Pile of Mud (LP - 1988)
- OG 19 - (Unknown)
- OG 20 - The Gruesomes, Hey! (LP - 1988)
- OG 21 - Various Artists, Mr. Garager's Neighbourhood (LP - 1989)
- OG 22 - U.I.C., Live Like 90 (LP - 1989)
- OG 23 - Captain Crunch and Let's Do Lunch, More Baroque-Post Industrial Hillbilly Launch Music (LP - 1989)
- OG 24 - The Dik Van Dykes, Waste More Vinyl (LP - 1989)
- OG 25 - Various Artists, It Came from Canada, Vol. 5 (LP - 1988)
- OG 26 - Supreme Bagg Team, Supreme Bagg Team (LP - 1989)
- OG 27 - Ripcordz, Ripcordz Are Go(d) (LP - 1989)
- OG 28 - Deja Voodoo, Live at the Backstage Club, Helsinki Finland (LP - 1990)
- OG 29 - Vindicators, Vindicators (Mini-LP - 1989)

== See also ==
- List of record labels
