= The Gruesomes =

Canadian garage punk band

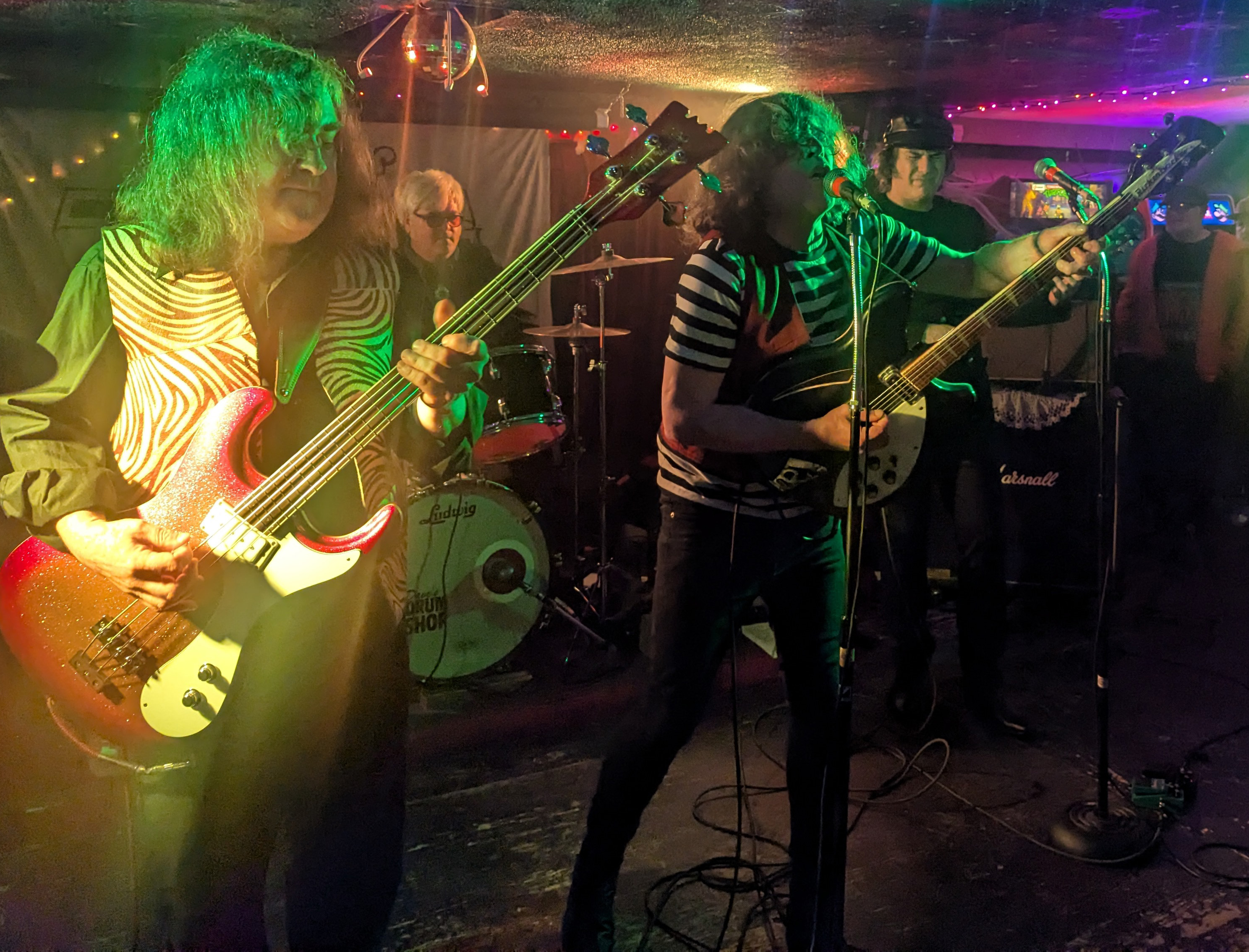
- The Gruesomes in Ottawa, Canada on November 1, 2025

Background information
- Origin: Montreal, Quebec, Canada
- Genre: Garage punk
- Years active: 1985–1990, 1999–present
- Labels: Primitive, OG, Ricochet Sound, Tyrant
- Members: Bobby Beaton; Gerry Alvarez; John Davis; John Knoll; Eric Davis
- Website: The Gruesomes myspace site

The Gruesomes are a Canadian garage punk band from Montreal, Quebec, Canada, that formed in 1985.

The band gained recognition following the 1986 release of their debut album, Tyrants of Teen Trash (Og Music), which led to an underground following in Europe, the United States (US) and Canada. Subsequent releases increased their fan base and, after periods of touring, the band established itself within the global garage music scene.

== History ==
With no previous musical experience, Bobby Beaton (guitar and vocals), Gerry Alvarez (guitar and vocals), John Davis (bass) and Davis' brother, Eric Davis (drums), were all between the ages of 16 and 19 when they began playing music together. The four teenagers were primarily inspired by long nights spent in their parents' basement watching television and listening to obscure mid-1960s records. Taking their name from the scary neighbours on television's The Flintstones, the Gruesomes developed an image of matching black turtlenecks, Beatle boots and bowl haircuts, combining it with a "snotty" punk musical style. Early live shows relied more on the group's energy and humour than actual musical ability; however, the Gruesomes proceeded to become a popular club act, despite their inexperience.

=== Og records ===
Within a year of forming, the Gruesomes recorded their debut LP for Og Records, an independent music label based in Montreal. In 1986, Tyrants of Teen Trash, a collection of primitive teen anthems, was released and fared well in the European and North American markets. In their home country of Canada, the album was often in the number one position on alternative playlists. The band's follow-up releases, also on Og, 1987's Gruesomania and 1988's Hey!, were also well-received and established the band as one of Canada's biggest selling underground acts.

=== Live shows ===
Known for their wild stage presence, the Gruesomes toured Canada and the US accompanied by a reputation for their live shows. Always taking an irreverent approach to music, the Gruesomes incorporated humor and goofy stage antics in their performances. Their Halloween shows were schlock tributes to horror themes, incorporating camp props such as coffins and Dracula capes. In 1987, following the release of Gruesomania, Ottawa's John Knoll replaced Eric Davis on drums and the band subsequently developed a harder, more polished Garage Punk sound.

=== Music videos ===
The Gruesomes released two music videos: 1987's "Way Down Below" and 1988's Monkees-inspired, "Hey!". Both clips received heavy rotation on Canada's video station MuchMusic.

=== Dissolution ===
The Gruesomes ceased operation as a band in 1990 and it is reported that the members believed that they had achieved the highest level of success that was possible for an underground musical act.

== Reformation ==
In late 1999, the Gruesomes reformed to coincide with the release of a new album, Cave-In!. A 14-track CD was released in Canada, whilst the album was sold as a 12" vinyl record in Germany. The tour to support Cave-In! was primarily driven by popular demand and resulted in the band playing shows in Germany, Italy, Switzerland, and Belgium.

The Gruesomes have since played many shows including Cavestomp in New York City (2000), The Funtastic Dracula Carnival in Benidorm, Spain (2017), Wild O'Fest in Mexico City (2018), and the Spider Monkey Festival in San José, Costa Rica in 2019. The Gruesomes are still active performing around the world.

== Discography ==
=== Singles and EPs ===
- "Jack The Ripper" (1986) (Primitive Records)
  - reissued in 2009 by (Fuzz Overdose Records)
- "Unchained!" (1987) (Primitive Records)
- "Someone Told A Lie/Make Up Your Mind" (2020) (Calico Wally)
- "Not A Chance/Girl In Time" (2024) (Calico Wally)

=== Albums ===
- Tyrants of Teen Trash (1986) (Og Music)
  - reissued in 2008 by (Ricochet Sound)
  - reissued in 2012 by (Groovie Records)
- Gruesomania (1987) (Og Music)
  - reissued in 2008 by (Ricochet Sound)
- Hey! (1988) (Og Music)
  - reissued in 2009 by (Ricochet Sound)
- Cave-in!! (2000) (Tyrant Records)
  - Issued in 2000 by (Jaguar Club Records)
  - reissued in 2007 by (Ricochet Sound)
- Gruesomology 1985-89 (2003) (Sundazed Music)
- Live in Hell (2007) (Ricochet Sound)
- The Dimension of Fear (2025) (Soundflat Records)

=== Compilations/Gruesomes solo projects ===
- Gruesomology 1985-89 (2003) (Sundazed Records)
- Fuad and The Feztones - In the Valley of the Kings (7"/EP)(2002) (Ricochet Sound)
- Gerry Alvarez Odyssey - Candy Prankster (2006) (Ricochet Sound)
- Fuad & the Feztones - Beeramid (2008) (Ricochet Sound)
- Gerry Alvarez Odyssey - Omega Tea Time (2010) (Ricochet Sound)

=== Music videos ===
- Way Down Below
- Hey!

== See also ==
- Music of Canada
- Music of Quebec
- Canadian rock
- List of Canadian musicians
- List of bands from Canada
- Category:Canadian musical groups
