= Ray Condo =

- Born: Ray Tremblay; May 16, 1950; Hull, Quebec, Canada
- Died: April 15, 2004 (aged 53) Vancouver, British Columbia, Canada
- Genres: Rockabilly, jazz, blues, country, western swing
- Occupations: Singer, instrumentalist
- Instruments: Saxophone, guitar
- Years active: 1966–2004
- Formerly of: The Peasants, The Secret V's, Ray Condo and his Hardrock Goners, The Five Star Hillbillies, The Ricochets
- Website: www.raycondo.ca

Ray Condo (May 16, 1950 – April 15, 2004), born Ray Tremblay, was a Canadian rockabilly singer, saxophonist, and guitarist.

== Early life ==
He was born Ray Tremblay in Hull, Quebec. He was raised in nearby Ottawa, Ontario, as the third of five children. His two older sisters were Eileen and Maureen, and his younger brothers were William (Billy) and Robert. He taught himself to play the guitar at the age of 11 and, by 16, had co-written and released his first recording, 'If You Only Knew', with a British Invasion–influenced band called The Peasants.

Ray attended a selective vocational high school for fine art and design established by the Ontario Ministry of Education for students with exceptional artistic ability. After completing the four-year program, he moved west to Vancouver, where he enrolled at the Emily Carr Institute of Art and Design. He left the institute after one year and subsequently turned his focus to music, working as a bass guitarist with the Vancouver punk rock band The Secret Vs.

== Career ==
He moved to Montreal intending to focus on painting, but again turned to music. There he formed the band Ray Condo and His Hardrock Goners with bassist Clive Jackson, banjoist Chris Dean, violinist Edgar Bridwell, guitarist Eric Sandmark, and drummer Peter Sandmark. The band’s name was inspired by Hardrock Gunter, an early rock and roll musician.

The Hardrock Goners worked in a variety of genres, such as rockabilly, jazz, blues, country and western swing. Their first recordings appeared on the Og label's compilations, It Came From Canada. They established the record label, Crazy Rekkids.

He earned the name "Condo" from friend Regan O'Connor, who also came up with the name of the band, Ray Condo and his Hardrock Goners.

In 1991, he returned to Vancouver. The Hardrock Goners toured with him for another three years, and then he and his bassist joined a group called The Five Star Hillbillies, to create a new group called The Ricochets, named after how much they "bounced around". They made their final album in 2000.

In 2003, Condo suffered from a minor heart attack. A year later, band member Ian Tiles found Condo dead from a heart attack in his Vancouver apartment.

== Discography ==
- 1986 – Crazy Date (Ray Condo & his Hardrock Goners) Pipeline Records
- 1988 – Hot & Cold (Ray Condo & his Hardrock Goners) Crazy Rekkids
- 1990 – Condo Country (Ray Condo & his Hardrock Goners) Crazy Rekkids
- 1991 – Condo Country (Ray Condo & his Hardrock Goners) CD version Crazy Rekkids
- 1991 – Condo Country (Ray Condo & his Hardrock Goners) EP version FURY Records
- 1993 – Hillbilly Holiday (Ray Condo & his Hardrock Goners) FURY Records
- 1994 – Come On! (Ray Condo & his Hardrock Goners) FURY Records
- 1996 – Swing Brother Swing (Ray Condo & his Ricochets) Joaquin Records
- 1997 – Door to Door Maniac (Ray Condo & his Ricochets) Joaquin Records
- 2000 – High & Wild (Ray Condo & his Ricochets) Joaquin Records
- 2004 – Sweet Love on My MInd/Big Dog Little Dog (Ray Condo & his Hardrock Goners/Ray Condo) Crazy Productions
- 2007 – Top Hits! Party Favourites! (Ray Condo & his Hardrock Goners) Crow-Matic Records
- 2017 – Hot 'N Cold reissue CD + 3 videos (Ray Condo & His Hardrock Goners) Super Oldies
