= Forgotten Rebels =

Punk rock band from Ontario, Canada

The Forgotten Rebels
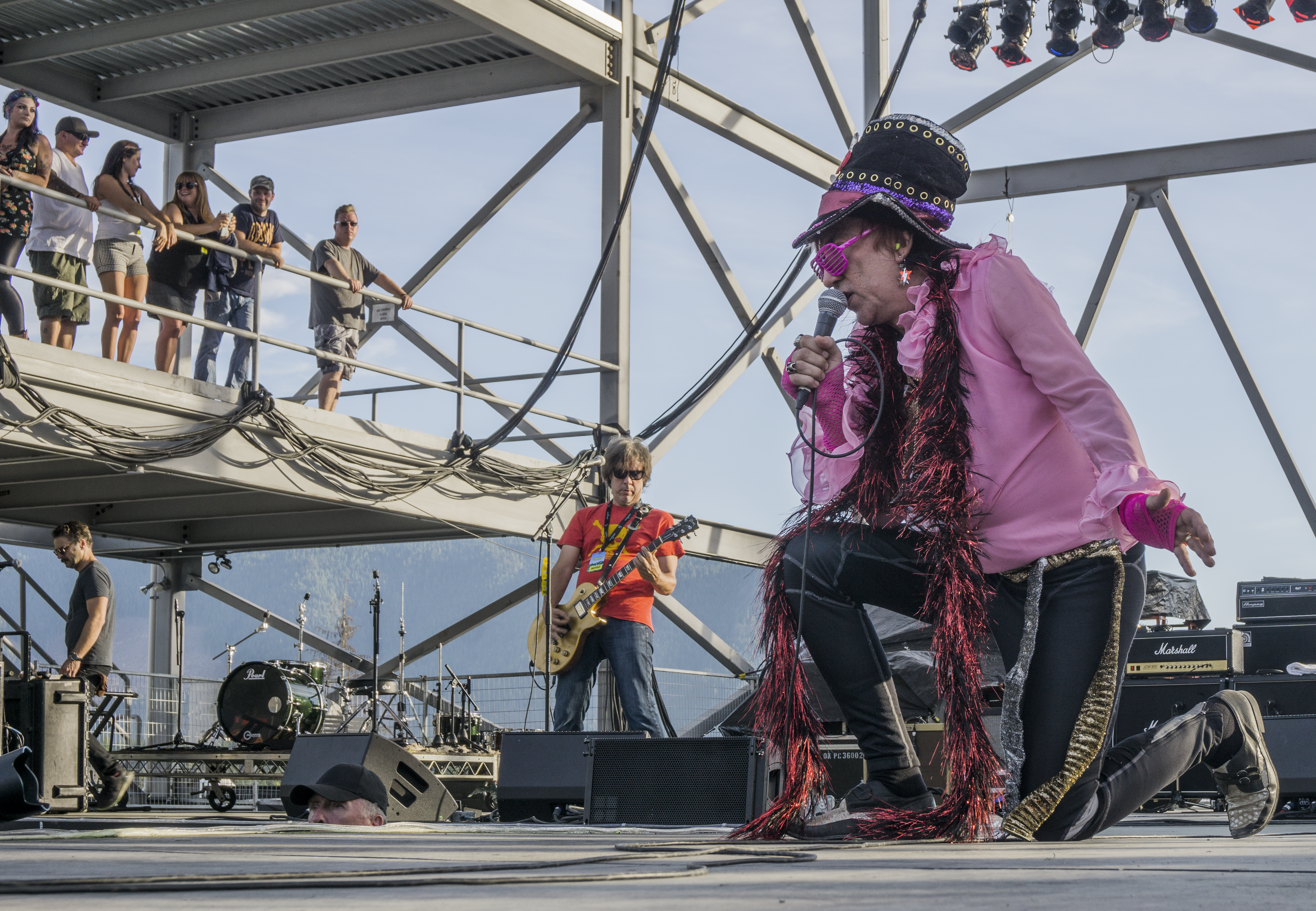
- The Forgotten Rebels in 2016. Left to Right: Jeff Campbell (guitar), Mickey DeSadist (vocals).

Background information
- Origin: Hamilton, Ontario, Canada
- Genres: Punk rock
- Years active: 1977–present
- Labels: Star; OPM; EMI; Restless; Enigma
- Spinoffs: The Mickey DeSadist Show
- Members: Mickey DeSadist; Jeff Campbell; Gymbo Jak; Dan Casale
- Website: ForgottenRebels.com

The Forgotten Rebels are a punk rock band from Hamilton, Ontario, Canada. Founded in 1977, the Forgotten Rebels have a discography of seven albums and a collection of EPs and singles.

== History ==
In 1979, Chris Houston (a.k.a. Pogo Agogo) joined the band and played bass on the 1980 release In Love With the System. Houston left the band just over a year later citing "creative differences" and time constraints as he pursued post secondary education.

== Band members ==
Current

- Mickey DeSadist (Mike Grelecki) – vocals (1977–present)
- Jeffrey Campbell – guitar (1989–present)
- Dan Casale – drums (2004–present)
- Gymbo Jak – bass (2023–present)

Former

- Alan J. Smolak – guitar (1978–1980)
- Mark Chewter – guitar (1980–1981)
- Mike Mirabella – guitar (1981–1989)
- Pete Timusk – bass (1977–1977)
- Carl Johnson – bass (1977–1979)
- Chris Houston – bass (1979–1980)
- John Welton – bass (1981–1986)
- Mike Szykowny – bass (1982–1989, 1991–1991)
- Dave Kyle – bass (1989–1991)
- Chaz Coats-Butcher – bass (1992–1997)
- Steve Mahon – bass (1997–2001)
- Angelo Maddalena – drums (1977–1978)
- Robert Allen – drums (1978–1978, 1981–1981)
- Pete Lotimer – drums (1978–1979)
- Cleave Anderson – drums (1978–1979)
- Larry Potvin – drums (1979–1980)
- Chuck McDonald – drums (1980–1980)
- Dave McGhire – drums (1981–2003)
- Joe Csontos – drums (1983–1984)
- Paul Newman – drums (2003–2004)
- Shawn Maher – Bass (2000–2023)

Timeline

== Discography ==
=== Albums ===
- In Love With the System (1980)
- This Ain't Hollywood (1981)
- The Pride and Disgrace (1986)
- Surfin' on Heroin (1988)
- (Untitled) (1989)
- Criminal Zero (1994)
- Executive Outcomes (1997)
- Nobody's Heros (2000)
- Brief Anthology (2000)
- Last Ones Standing (2011)

=== EPs ===
- Burn The Flag (1978)
- Tomorrow Belongs to Us (1978)
- Boys Will Be Boys (1985)

=== Singles ===
- "Tell me You Love Me" / "Rhona Barrett" (Remix) (1982)
- "Bomb Kadhaffi Now" / "Surfin' on Heroin" (1986)

=== Sex Pistols / Forgotten Rebels combo single ===
- A side: Sex Pistols "God Save the Queen"
- B side: Forgotten Rebels "Surfin' on Heroin"

=== Videos ===
- Elvis is Dead (1979)
- Eve of Destruction (1980)
- Boys Will be Boys (1985)
- Rock n Roll is a Hard Life (1989)
- Dizzy (1990)
- The Hammer (1994)
- Buried Alive (1994)
