= McMaster School of the Arts =

Art school of McMaster University

McMaster University School of the Arts
- Type: Public university faculty
- Director: Keith Kinder
- Location: Hamilton, Ontario, Canada; 43°15′48″N 79°55′8″W
- Campus: Urban, 152.4 hectares (377 acres)
- Colours: Maroon and Grey
- Website: http://sota.humanities.mcmaster.ca/

The McMaster University School of the Arts (SOTA; formerly "School of Art, Drama and Music") is a department within the Faculty of Humanities at McMaster University located in the city of Hamilton in the Canadian province of Ontario. The faculty offers academic studies in studio art, art history, music, theatre, and film. In addition to academic studies, the School of the Arts offers other activities related to the arts, such as music concerts, theatre productions, art exhibitions, and special lectures.

In conjunction with the Department of Psychology, SOTA offers a specialization in music cognition at the bachelor's level, allowing students to receive rigorous training in both music and psychology.
