= 2006 Toronto International Film Festival =

Annual Canadian film festival

- Festival poster
- Opening film: The Journals of Knud Rasmussen
- Closing film: Amazing Grace
- Location: Toronto, Ontario, Canada
- Hosted by: Toronto International Film Festival Group
- No. of films: 352 films
- Festival date: September 7, 2006–September 16, 2006
- Language: English
- Website: tiff.net
- 2007 2005

The 31st Toronto International Film Festival ran from September 7 to September 16, 2006. Opening the festival was Zacharias Kunuk and Norman Cohn's The Journals of Knud Rasmussen, a film that "explores the history of the Inuit people [sic] through the eyes of a father and daughter."

In a press release dated June 27, 2006, twenty-six international film selections were announced which previously premiered at major film festivals worldwide. Of the films announced, twenty-five of them will receive their North American premiere.

Among the many anticipated films were Babel by Alejandro González Iñárritu, Volver by Pedro Almodóvar, Election 2 (a.k.a. Triad Election) by Johnnie To, The Fountain by Darren Aronofsky and The Host by Bong Joon-ho.

Bella took top prize at the 2006 Toronto International Film Festival by winning the highly coveted "People's Choice Award", a distinction which puts them in the company of such Oscar-winning films as Chariots of Fire, American Beauty, Life Is Beautiful, Crouching Tiger, Hidden Dragon and Hotel Rwanda. Last year's winner of the "People's Choice" Award, Tsotsi, won an Oscar for best foreign-language film.

Bella marks the feature directorial debut for Alejandro Monteverde, who also co-wrote its original screenplay with Patrick Million. Bella features Manuel Perez, Angélica Aragón, Jaime Terelli and Ali Landry. Bella was produced by Sean Wolfington, Eduardo Verastegui, Leo Severino, Alejandro Monteverde and Denise Pinckley and executive produced by J. Eustace Wolfington, Ana Wolfington and Stephen McEveety. The film was financed by producers Sean Wolfingtonand Eustace Wolfington. McEveety (Braveheart, We Were Soldiers, Passion of the Christ) consulted on the script and signed on as an Executive Producer to help market the movie. Bella is McEveety's first release under his nascent Mpower Films moniker and marks his first feature since ankling Mel Gibson's Icon productions.

== Awards ==
Awards presented during the film festival included:

- The People's Choice Award, presented to Alejandro Gomez Monteverde's Bella.
- The Diesel Discovery Award, presented to Joachim Trier's Reprise.
- The Fipresci Prize, presented to Gabriel Range's Death of a President.
- The Citytv Award for Best Canadian First Feature, presented to Noël Mitrani's On the Trail of Igor Rizzi (Sur la trace d'Igor Rizzi).
- The Toronto – City Award for Best Canadian Feature Film, presented to Jennifer Baichwal's documentary Manufactured Landscapes.
- The Short Cuts Canada Award, presented to Maxime Giroux for his short film Les Jours.
- The Swarovski Cultural Innovation Award, presented to Özer Kýzýltan's TAKVA - A Man's Fear of God.

== Programme ==
=== Gala Presentations ===
- After the Wedding (Denmark/Sweden) Susanne Bier #LosSerrano15
- All the King's Men (USA) Steven Zaillian
- Amazing Grace (UK/USA) Michael Apted
- Away from Her (Canada) Sarah Polley #LosSerrano
- Babel (USA) Alejandro González Iñárritu
- The Banquet (China) Feng Xiaogang
- Black Book (Netherlands) Paul Verhoeven #LosSerrano5
- Bobby (USA) Emilio Estevez #LosSerrano3
- Bonneville (USA) Christopher N. Rowley
- Breaking and Entering (USA) Anthony Minghella #LosSerrano9
- Dixie Chicks: Shut Up and Sing (USA) Barbara Kopple, Cecilia Peck
- For Your Consideration (USA) Christopher Guest
- A Good Year (UK) Ridley Scott
- Infamous (USA) Douglas McGrath #LosSerrano24
- The Journals of Knud Rasmussen (Canada/Denmark) Zacharias Kunuk, Norman Cohn
- Mon Meilleur Ami (France) Patrice Leconte #LosSerrano26
- Never Say Goodbye (India) Karan Johar
- Penelope (USA/UK/Germany) Mark Palansky
- Volver (Spain) Pedro Almodóvar #LosSerrano13
- The White Planet (Canada/France) Thierry Piantanida, Thierry Ragobert, Jean Lemire

=== Special Presentations ===
- 10 Items or Less (USA) Brad Silberling #LosSerrano17
- Alatriste (Spain) Agustín Díaz Yanes
- Begone Dull Care (Canada) Norman McLaren, Evelyn Lambart
- Bernard and Doris (USA) Bob Balaban
- Blinkity Blank (Canada) Norman McLaren
- Brand Upon the Brain! (Canada/USA) Guy Maddin
- The Bubble (Israel) Eytan Fox
- Catch a Fire (United Kingdom/South Africa/USA) Phillip Noyce #LosSerrano3
- A Chairy Tale (Canada) Norman McLaren, Claude Jutra
- Congorama (Canada) Philippe Falardeau
- Das Leben der Anderen (Germany) Florian Henckel von Donnersmarck #LosSerrano7
- The Dog Problem (USA) Scott Caan
- El Cantante (USA) Leon Ichaso
- Exiled (Hong Kong) Johnnie To
- The Fall (India/UK/USA) Tarsem Singh
- Fay Grim (USA/Germany) Hal Hartley #LosSerrano24
- The Fountain (USA) Darren Aronofsky #LosSerrano17
- Golden Door (Italy/France) Emanuele Crialese #LosSerrano24
- Hana (Japan) Hirokazu Koreeda #LosSerrano28
- Hen Hop (Canada) Norman McLaren
- L'Homme De Sa Vie (France/Italy) Zabou Breitman
- Horizontal Lines (Canada) Norman McLaren, Evelyn Lambart
- Jindabyne (Australia) Ray Lawrence #LosSerrano27
- Kabul Express (India) Kabir Khan
- The Last King of Scotland (UK) Kevin Macdonald #LosSerrano8
- The Last Kiss (USA) Tony Goldwyn
- Little Children (USA) Todd Field #LosSerrano6
- Love and Other Disasters (France/UK) Alek Keshishian
- The Magic Flute (UK) Kenneth Branagh #LosSerrano14
- Manufactured Landscapes (Canada) Jennifer Baichwal
- Le Merle (Canada) Norman McLaren
- Mon Colonel (France/Algeria/Belgium) Laurent Herbiet
- The Namesake (USA) Mira Nair #LosSerrano21
- Neighbours (Canada) Norman McLaren
- Nue Propriete (Belgium/France) Joachim Lafosse #LosSerrano26
- Opening Speech (Canada) Norman McLaren
- Pan's Labyrinth (Spain) Guillermo del Toro
- Paris, Je T'aime Bruno Podalydes, Gurinder Chadha, Gus Van Sant, Joel Coen, Ethan Coen, Walter Salles, Daniela Thomas, Christopher Doyle, Isabel Coixet, Nobuhiro Suwa, Sylvain Chomet, Alfonso Cuaron, Olivier Assayas, Oliver Schmitz, Richard LaGravenese, Vincenzo Natali, Wes Craven, Tom Tykwer, Frederic Auburtin, Gerard Depardieu, Alexander Payne #LosSerrano8
- Pas de Deux (Canada) Norman McLaren
- The Pleasure of Your Company (USA) Michael Ian Black
- The Postmodern Life of My Aunt (China) Ann Hui
- Quelques Jours en Septembre (France) Santiago Amigorena
- Seraphim Falls (USA) David Von Ancken
- Snow Cake (Canada/UK) Marc Evans
- Stars and Stripes (Canada) Norman McLaren
- Stranger Than Fiction (USA) Marc Forster #LosSerrano3
- Synchromy (Canada) Norman McLaren
- This Is England (UK) Shane Meadows #LosSerrano3
- A Crime (France) Manuel Pradal
- Venus (UK) Roger Michell #LosSerrano8
- Vince Vaughn's Wild West Comedy Show (USA) Ari Sandel
- Woman on the Beach (South Korea) Hong Sang-soo

=== Masters ===
- The Wind That Shakes the Barley (France/Ireland/UK/Italy/Spain/Germany) — Ken Loach
- The Caiman (Italy) — Nanni Moretti
- EMPz 4 Life (Canada) — Allan King
- Lights In The Dusk (Finland/Germany/France) — Aki Kaurismäki
- The Optimists (Serbia) — Goran Paskaljević

=== Real to Reel ===
- Blindsight (United Kingdom) Lucy Walker
- These Girls (Egypt) Tahani Rached
- Remembering Arthur (Canada) Martin Lavut
- Shame (Pakistan/USA) Mohammed Naqvi

=== Discovery ===
- Bliss (China) Sheng Zhimin
- Reprise (Norway) Joachim Trier
- Vanaja (India/USA) Rajnesh Domalpalli
- Out of the Blue (New Zealand) Robert Sarkies
- Sharkwater (Canada) Rob Stewart

=== Visions ===
- Flandres (France) Bruno Dumont
- Big Bang Love, Juvenile A (Japan) Takashi Miike
- Ten Canoes (Australia) Rolf de Heer
- Taxidermia (Hungary/Austria/France) György Pálfi
- Bamako (France/Mali/USA) Abderrahmane Sissako
- Time (South Korea) Kim Ki-duk

=== Contemporary World Cinema ===
- The Last Winter (USA/Iceland) Larry Fessenden
- Red Road (UK) Andrea Arnold
- 12:08 East of Bucharest (Romania) Corneliu Porumboiu
- Invisible Waves (Thailand/Netherlands/Hong Kong) Pen-Ek Ratanaruang
- To Get to Heaven, First You Have to Die (France/Germany/Switzerland/Tajikistan) Djamshed Usmonov
- White Palms (Hungary) Szabolcs Hajdu
- Summer Palace (China/France) Lou Ye
- Summer '04 (Germany) Stefan Krohmer
- The Bothersome Man (Norway) Jens Lien
- Retrieval (Poland) Slawomir Fabicki
- Cronica De Una Fuga (Argentina) Israel Adrián Caetano
- Slumming (Austria/Switzerland) Michael Glawogger
- Shortbus (U.S.A.) John Cameron Mitchell
- Copying Beethoven (UK/Hungary) Agnieszka Holland
- Bella (U.S.A.) Alejandro Monteverde

=== Midnight Madness ===
- Borat: Cultural Learnings of America for Make Benefit Glorious Nation of Kazakhstan (USA) Larry Charles
- Black Sheep (New Zealand) Jonathan King
- All The Boys Love Mandy Lane (USA) Jonathan Levine
- Trapped Ashes (USA/Japan/Canada) Cunningham/Dante/Gaeta/Hellman/Russell
- The Abandoned (Spain) Nacho Cerdà
- The Host (South Korea) Bong Joon-ho
- Severance (UK) Christopher Smith
- Princess (Denmark) Anders Morgenthaler
- S&Man (USA) JT Petty
- Sheitan (France) Kim Chapiron

=== Vanguard ===
- Macbeth (Australia) Geoffrey Wright
- Chacun Sa Nuit (France) Pascal Arnold/Jean-Marc Barr
- Jade Warrior (Finland/China/Estonia) Antti-Jussi Annila
- Bunny Chow (South Africa) John Barker
- Shortbus (USA) John Cameron Mitchell
- Renaissance (France/UK/Luxembourg) Christian Volckman
- Election (Hong Kong) Johnnie To
- Election 2 (Hong Kong) Johnnie To
- Drama/Mex (Mexico) Gerardo Naranjo
- 2:37 (Australia) Murali K. Thalluri
- Suburban Mayhem (Australia) Paul Goldman
- Sleeping Dogs Lie (USA) Bobcat Goldthwait

=== Canada First! ===
- Acts of Imagination, Carolyn Combs
- Cheech, Patrice Sauvé
- La Coupure, Jean Châteauvert
- End of the Line, Maurice Devereaux
- Everything's Gone Green, Paul Fox
- Fido, Andrew Currie
- Mercy, Mazdak Taebi
- On the Trail of Igor Rizzi (Sur la trace d'Igor Rizzi), Noël Mitrani
- A Stone's Throw, Camelia Frieberg

=== Short Cuts ===
- Aruba, Hubert Davis
- The Broken Hearted, Antoinette Karuna
- By the Hour, Bill Marchant
- Christ in Wood, Alexander Winfield
- Cloudbreaker, Adam Garnet Jones
- Couldn't Be Happier, Jackie May
- The Days (Les Jours), Maxime Giroux
- The Dead Water (Les Eaux mortes), Guy Édoin
- The Double Woman, Carla B. Guttmann
- Down Payment on a Dead Horse, Jason Britski
- The Ecstasy Note, Geoffrey Uloth
- Elizabeth, Deco Dawson
- The Eyes of Edward James, Rodrigo Gudiño
- If I See Randy Again Do You Want Me to Hit Him with the Axe?, Vivieno Caldinelli
- In the Dark (À l'ombre), Simon Lavoie
- Intolerable, Alison Maclean
- The Last Bang, Emmanuel Shirinian
- A Life of Errors, Nicholas Pye and Sheila Pye
- Love Seat, Kris Elgstrand
- The Man Who Waited (L'Homme qui attendait), Theodore Ushev
- Ninth Street Chronicles, Megan Martin
- Nobody (L'air de rien), Frédérick Pelletier
- Nude Caboose, Guy Maddin
- Où est Maurice?, Alek Rzeszowski and Matthew Rankin
- Patterns 2, Jamie Travis
- Patterns 3, Jamie Travis
- Plume, Chelsea McMullan
- Pretty Broken, Cline Mayo
- The Runner, Robert Delaskie
- The Saddest Boy in the World, Jamie Travis
- Saskatchewan Part 3, Brian Stockton
- Screening, Anthony Green
- Starlight Tour, Evan Crowe
- Supposed To, Aleesa Cohene
- Suspect, Patricia Rozema
- Tell Me Everything, Brian D. Johnson
- La Tête haute, Ivan Grbovic
- The Tragic Story of Nling, Jeffrey St. Jules
- True Love, Adam Brodie and Dave Derewlany
- The Wait, Ann Verrall

== Canada's Top Ten ==
TIFF's annual Canada's Top Ten list, its national critics and festival programmers poll of the ten best feature and short films of the year, was released in December 2006.

- Away from Her — Sarah Polley
- Congorama — Philippe Falardeau
- The Journals of Knud Rasmussen — Zacharias Kunuk, Norman Cohn
- Manufactured Landscapes — Jennifer Baichwal
- Monkey Warfare — Reginald Harkema
- On the Trail of Igor Rizzi (Sur la trace d'Igor Rizzi) — Noël Mitrani
- Radiant City — Gary Burns, Jim Brown
- Sharkwater — Rob Stewart
- A Sunday in Kigali (Un dimanche à Kigali) — Robert Favreau
- Trailer Park Boys: The Movie — Mike Clattenburg
