= 2006 Cannes Film Festival =

- Official poster of the 59th Cannes Film Festival featuring a still from Wong Kar-wai's 2000 film In the Mood for Love.
- Opening film: The Da Vinci Code
- Closing film: Transylvania
- Location: Cannes, France
- Founded: 1946
- Awards: Palme d'Or: The Wind That Shakes the Barley
- Hosted by: Vincent Cassel
- No. of films: 20 (Main Competition)
- Festival date: 17 May 2006 – 28 May 2006
- Website: festival-cannes.com/en

Cannes Film Festival
- 2007 2005

The 59th Cannes Film Festival was held from 17 to 28 May 2006. Chinese filmmaker Wong Kar-wai served as jury president for the main competition, becoming the first Chinese person to do so. English filmmaker Ken Loach won the Palme d'Or for the war drama film The Wind That Shakes the Barley.

The official poster for the festival features a still image from the Wong Kar-wai's 2000 film In the Mood for Love, which won the Best Actor award at the 53rd edition.

The festival opening film was The Da Vinci Code directed by Ron Howard. While Transylvania by Tony Gatlif was the closing film.

This edition also marked the first time in three years that no American film, actor, actress, or filmmaker won any awards in Cannes.

2006 Un Certain Regard poster featuring an original drawing by Russian filmmaker Sergei Eisenstein.

== Juries ==
=== Main competition ===
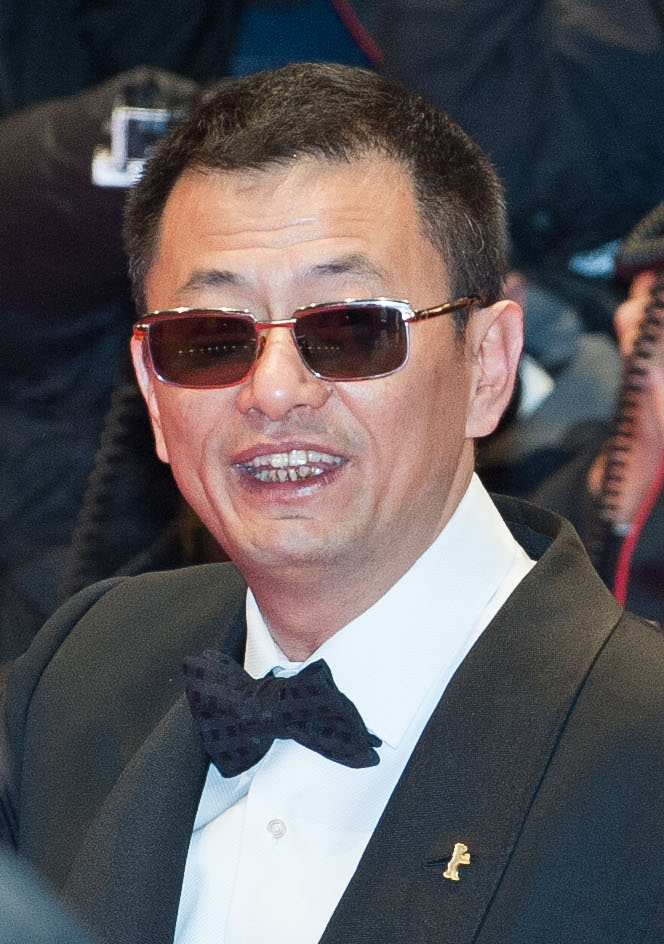
Wong Kar-wai, 2006 Jury President

- Wong Kar-wai, Hong Kong filmmaker - Jury President
- Monica Bellucci, Italian actress
- Helena Bonham Carter, British actress
- Samuel L. Jackson, American actor
- Patrice Leconte, French actor, director and screenwriter
- Lucrecia Martel, Argentinian filmmaker
- Tim Roth, British actor
- Elia Suleiman, Palestinian filmmaker
- Zhang Ziyi, Chinese actress

=== Un Certain Regard ===
- Monte Hellman, American director - Jury President
- Lars-Olav Beier, German critic
- Maurizio Cabonat, Italian critic
- Jean-Pierre Lavoignat, French critic
- Marjane Satrapi, Iranian author
- Laura Winters, American critic

=== Cinéfondation and Short Films Competition ===
- Andrei Konchalovsky, Russian filmmaker - Jury President
- Sandrine Bonnaire, French actress
- Daniel Brühl, German actor
- Tim Burton, American filmmaker
- Souleymane Cissé, Malian filmmaker
- Zbigniew Preisner, Polish composer

=== Camera d'Or ===
- Jean-Pierre Dardenne, Belgian filmmaker - Jury Co-President
- Luc Dardenne, Belgian filmmaker - Jury Co-President
- Natacha Laurent, French director of the cinémathèque of Toulouse
- Frédéric Maire, Swiss president of Locarno Festival
- Luiz Carlos Merten, Brazilian critic
- Jean-Pierre Neyrac, French technician
- Alain Riou, French critic
- Jean-Paul Salomé, French director
- Jean-Louis Vialard, French cinematographer

== Official Selection ==
=== In Competition ===
The following feature films competed for the Palme d'Or:

English title	Original title	Director(s)	Production Country
Babel		Alejandro González Iñárritu	United States, Mexico, Morocco, France
The Caiman	Il caimano	Nanni Moretti	Italy
Charlie Says	Selon Charlie	Nicole Garcia	France
Chronicle of an Escape	Crónica de una fuga	Israel Adrián Caetano	Argentina
Climates	İklimler	Nuri Bilge Ceylan	Turkey
Colossal Youth	Juventude em Marcha	Pedro Costa	Portugal
Days of Glory	Indigènes	Rachid Bouchareb	France, Morocco, Belgium, Algeria
The Family Friend	L'amico di famiglia	Paolo Sorrentino	Italy
Fast Food Nation		Richard Linklater	United States, United Kingdom
Flanders	Flandres	Bruno Dumont	France
Lights In The Dusk	Laitakaupungin valot	Aki Kaurismäki	Finland, Germany, France
Marie Antoinette		Sofia Coppola	United States, France, Japan
Pan's Labyrinth	El laberinto del fauno	Guillermo del Toro	Spain, Mexico
Red Road		Andrea Arnold	United Kingdom, Denmark
The Right of the Weakest	La Raison du plus faible	Lucas Belvaux	Belgium
Southland Tales		Richard Kelly	United States, Germany
Summer Palace	頤和園	Lou Ye	China
Volver		Pedro Almodóvar	Spain
When I Was a Singer	Quand j'étais chanteur	Xavier Giannoli	France
The Wind That Shakes the Barley		Ken Loach	Ireland, United Kingdom, Italy, Germany, France, Spain, Switzerland

=== Un Certain Regard ===
The following films were selected for the competition of Un Certain Regard:

English title	Original title	Director(s)	Production Country
2:37		Murali K. Thalluri	Australia
977	Девять семь семь	Nikolay Khomeriki	Russia
Bled Number One		Rabah Ameur-Zaïmeche	Algeria, France
French California	La Californie	Jacques Fieschi	France
Luxury Car	江城夏日	Wang Chao	China, France
Murderers	Meurtrières	Patrick Grandperret	France
The Page Turner	La Tourneuse de pages	Denis Dercourt	France
Paraguayan Hammock	Hamaca paraguaya	Paz Encina	Paraguay
Paris, je t'aime		Gurinder Chadha, Bruno Podalydès, Gus Van Sant, Coen brothers, Walter Salles and Daniela Thomas, Christopher Doyle, Isabel Coixet, Suwa Nobuhiro, Sylvain Chomet, Alfonso Cuarón, Olivier Assayas, Oliver Schmitz, Richard LaGravenese, Vincenzo Natali, Wes Craven, Tom Tykwer, Gérard Depardieu, Frédéric Auburtin, Alexander Payne	France, Germany, Switzerland, Liechtenstein
Re-cycle	鬼域	The Pang Brothers	Hong Kong, Thailand
Retrieval	Z odzysku	Sławomir Fabicki	Poland
Salvador	Salvador (Puig Antich)	Manuel Huerga	Spain, United Kingdom
A Scanner Darkly		Richard Linklater	United States
Serambi		Garin Nugroho, Tonny Trimarsanto, Viva Westi, Lianto Luseno	Indonesia
Suburban Mayhem		Paul Goldman	Australia
Taxidermia		György Pálfi	Hungary, Austria, France
Ten Canoes		Rolf de Heer	Australia
To Get to Heaven, First You Have to Die	Чтобы Добраться до Небес Сначала, Вы должны Умереть	Jamshed Usmonov	Tajikistan
The Unforgiven	용서받지 못한 자	Yoon Jong-bin	South Korea
Uro		Stefan Faldbakken	Norway
The Violin	El violin	Francisco Vargas	Mexico
The Way I Spent the End of the World	Cum mi-am petrecut sfârșitul lumii	Cătălin Mitulescu	Romania
The Wedding Director	Il regista di matrimoni	Marco Bellocchio	Italy
You Am I	Aš esi tu	Kristijonas Vildziunas	Lithuania

=== Out of Competition ===
The following films were selected to be screened out of competition:

English title	Original title	Director(s)	Production Country
An Inconvenient Truth		Davis Guggenheim	United States
Avida		Benoît Delépine and Gustave Kervern	France
Bamako		Abderrahmane Sissako	Mali, France, United Sta
Boffo! Tinseltown's Bombs and Blockbusters		Bill Couturié	United States
The Boy on the Galloping Horse	Chłopiec na galopującym koniu	Adam Guziński	Poland
Clerks II		Kevin Smith	United States
A Curtain Raiser (short)	Un lever de rideau	François Ozon	France
The Da Vinci Code (opening film)		Ron Howard	United States, Malta, France, United Kingdom
El-banate dol		Tahani Rached	Egypt
Election 2	黑社會:以和爲貴	Johnnie To	Hong Kong
Halim	حليم	Sherif Arafa	Egypt
The House Is Burning		Holger Ernst	Germany
I Only Wanted to Live	Volevo solo vivere	Mimmo Calopresti	Italy
Ici Najac, à vous la terre		Jean-Henri Meunier	France
Oh La La!	Nouvelle chance	Anne Fontaine	France
Over the Hedge		Tim Johnson and Karey Kirkpatrick	United States
Requiem for Billy the Kid	Requiem pour Billy the Kid	Anne Feinsilber	France
Room 666 (1982)	Chambre 666	Wim Wenders	France, West Germany
Les signes (short)		Eugène Green	France
Shortbus		John Cameron Mitchell	United States
SIDA (short)		Gaspar Noé	France
Silk	詭絲	Su Chao-pin	Taiwan
Sketches of Frank Gehry		Sydney Pollack	United States
Stanley's Girlfriend (short)		Monte Hellman	United States
Transylvania (closing film)		Tony Gatlif	France
United 93		Paul Greengrass	United States, United Kingdom, France
The Water Diary (short)		Jane Campion	France
X-Men: The Last Stand		Brett Ratner	United States
Zidane: A 21st Century Portrait	Zidane, un portrait du 21e siècle	Philippe Parreno and Douglas Gordon	France

=== Cinéfondation ===
The following short films were selected for the competition of Cinéfondation:

- Doorman by Etienne Kallos
- Een ingewikkeld verhaal, eenvoudig verteld by Jaap van Heusden
- Elastinen parturi by Milla Nybondas
- Emile's Girlfriend (Ha'chavera shell Emile) by Nadav Lapid
- Even Kids Started Small by Yaniv Berman
- Firn by Axel Koenzen
- Ge & Zeta by Gustavo Riet
- Une goutte d'eau by Deniz Gamze Ergüven
- Graceland by Anocha Suwichakornpong
- Hunde by Matthias Huser
- Jaba by Andreas Bolm
- Justiça ao insulto by Bruno Jorge
- Mother by Siân Heder
- Mr. Schwartz, Mr. Hazen & Mr. Horlocker by Stefan Mueller
- Snow by Dustin Feneley
- Tetris by Anirban Datta
- Le virus by Ágnes Kocsis

=== Short Films Competition ===
The following short films competed for the Short Film Palme d'Or:

- Banquise by Cédric Louis, Claude Barras
- Conte de quartier by Florence Miailhe
- Film noir by Osbert Parker
- Nature's Way by Jane Shearer
- O monstro by Eduardo Valente
- Ongeriewe by Robin Kleinsmidt
- Poyraz by Belma Bas
- Primera nieve by Pablo Aguero
- Sexy Thing by Denie Pentecost
- Sniffer by Bobbie Peers

=== Cannes Classics ===
The Cannes Classics section highlights heritage cinema, re-discovered films, restored prints and theatrical, television or DVD releases of great films of the past.

Tribute

- India Song by Marguerite Duras (1975)
- Sergei Eisenstein
  - Hommage A Sergei Eisensten (02:17)
  - Bezhin Meadow (Bejin lug) by Sergei Eisenstein (1936 short)
- Alejandro Jodorowsky
  - The Holy Mountain (1973)
  - El Topo (1970)
- Carol Reed
  - A Kid for Two Farthings (1955)
  - The Fallen Idol (1948)
  - Odd Man Out (1947)
  - The Way Ahead (1944)
- Seance John Ford / John Wayne (03:22)
- Norman McLaren
  - Programme McLaren (01:30)
  - Norman McLaren's Opening Speech with Arthur Lipset (1961 short)
  - Begone Dull Care (1949 short) with Evelyn Lambart
  - Blinkity Blank (1955 short)
  - A Chairy Tale (1957 short) with Claude Jutra
  - Hen Hop (1942 short)
  - Lines horizontal (1962 short) with Evelyn Lambart
  - Mail Early (1941 short)
  - Le merle (1958 short)
  - Neighbours (1952 short)
  - Pas de deux (1968 short)
  - La poulette grise (1947 short)
  - Stars and Stripes (1940 short)
  - Synchromy (1971 short)

Documentaries about Cinema

- Il était une fois...Rome ville ouverte by Marie Genin, Serge July
- John Ford / John Wayne: The Filmmaker and the Legend by Sam Pollard
- Marcello, una vita dolce by Annarosa Morri, Mario Canale

Restored prints

- The 14 Amazons (Shi si nu ying hao) by Kang Cheng (1972)
- Blast of Silence by Allen Baron (1961)
- Cabiria by Giovanni Pastrone (1914)
- Violent Summer by Valerio Zurlini (1959)
- The Hussy (La Drolesse) by Jacques Doillon (1978)
- Harvest: 3,000 Years (Mirt Sost Shi Amit) by Haile Gerima (1975)
- The Last Adventure (Les Aventuriers) by Robert Enrico (1967)
- Monte Cristo by Henri Fescourt (1929)
- Le mystère de la tour Eiffel by Julien Duvivier (1927)
- Nausicaä of the Valley of the Wind (Kaze no Tani no Naushika) by Hayao Miyazaki (1984)
- October: Ten Days That Shook the World (Oktyabr) by Sergei Eisenstein, Grigori Aleksandrov (1927)
- Platoon by Oliver Stone (1986)
- Rome, Open City (Roma città aperta) by Roberto Rossellini (1945)
- The Searchers by John Ford (1956)
- La Terra Trema by Luchino Visconti (1948)

== Parallel sections ==
=== International Critics' Week ===
The following films were screened for the 45th International Critics' Week (45e Semaine de la Critique):

Feature film competition

- Drama/Mex by Gerardo Naranjo (Mexico)
- Fresh Air by Ágnes Kocsis (Hungary)
- Komma by Martine Doyen (France, Belgium)
- Les amitiés maléfiques by Emmanuel Bourdieu (France)
- The Bothersome Man by Jens Lien (Norway)
- Pingpong by Matthias Luthardt (Germany)
- Fish Dreams (Sonhos de peixe) by Kirill Mikhanovsky (Brazil)

Short film competition

- Alguma coisa assim by Esmir Filho
- Iron by Hiroyuki Nakano
- Kristall by Christoph Girardet, Matthias Müller
- Kvinna vid grammofon by Johannes Stjärne Nilsson, Ola Simonsson
- L'écluse by Olivier Ciechelski
- News by Ursula Ferrara
- Printed Rainbow by Gitanjali Rao

=== Directors' Fortnight ===
The following films were screened for the 2006 Directors' Fortnight (Quinzaine des Réalizateurs):

- 12:08 East of Bucharest by Corneliu Porumboiu (Romania)
- Along the Ridge (Libero) by Kim Rossi Stuart (Italy)
- Les Anges Exterminateurs by Jean-Claude Brisseau (France)
- Azur et Asmar by Michel Ocelot (France)
- Bug by William Friedkin (United States)
- Ça brûle by Claire Simon (France)
- Change of Address by Emmanuel Mouret (France)
- Congorama by Philippe Falardeau (Canada)
- Daft Punk's Electroma by Thomas Bangalter, Guy-Manuel de Homem-Christo (France)
- Dans Paris by Christophe Honoré (France)
- Day Night Day Night by Julia Loktev (United States, France, Germany)
- The Hawk Is Dying by Julian Goldberger (United States)
- Honor de Cavalleria by Albert Serra (Spain)
- The Host by Bong Joon Ho (South Korea)
- Jindabyne by Ray Lawrence (Australia)
- Lying by M. Blash (United States)
- Princesse by Anders Morgenthaler (Denmark)
- Summer '04 by Stefan Krohmer (Germany)
- Sway by Miwa Nishikawa (Japan)
- Transe by Teresa Villaverde (Italy, France)
- The Way I Spent the End of the World by Catalin Mitulescu (Romania, France)
- We Should Not Exist by Hervé P. Gustave (France)
- White Palms by Szabolcs Hajdu (Hungary)

Short films

- The Aluminum Fowl by James Clauer
- Bugcrush by Carter Smith
- By the Kiss by Yann Gonzalez
- Dans le rang by Cyprien Vial
- L'Étoile de mer by Sophie Letourneur
- Menged by Daniel Taye Workou
- Rapace by João Nicolau
- Un rat by Bosilka Simonovitch
- Sepohon Rambutan indah kepunyaanku di tanjung rambutan by Bin HajiSaari U-Wei
- Le Soleil et la mort voyagent ensemble by Frank Beauvais

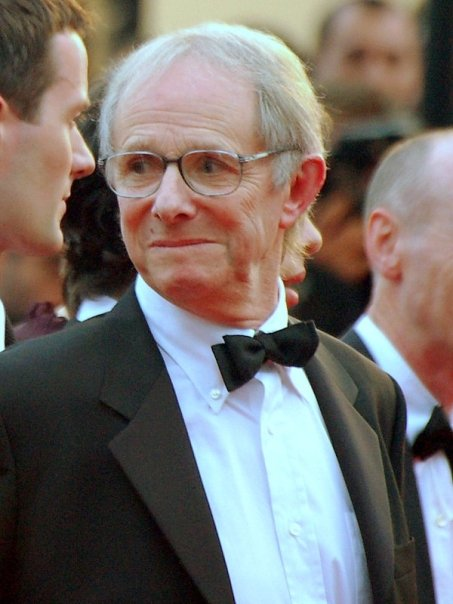
Ken Loach, winner of the Palme d'Or at the event.

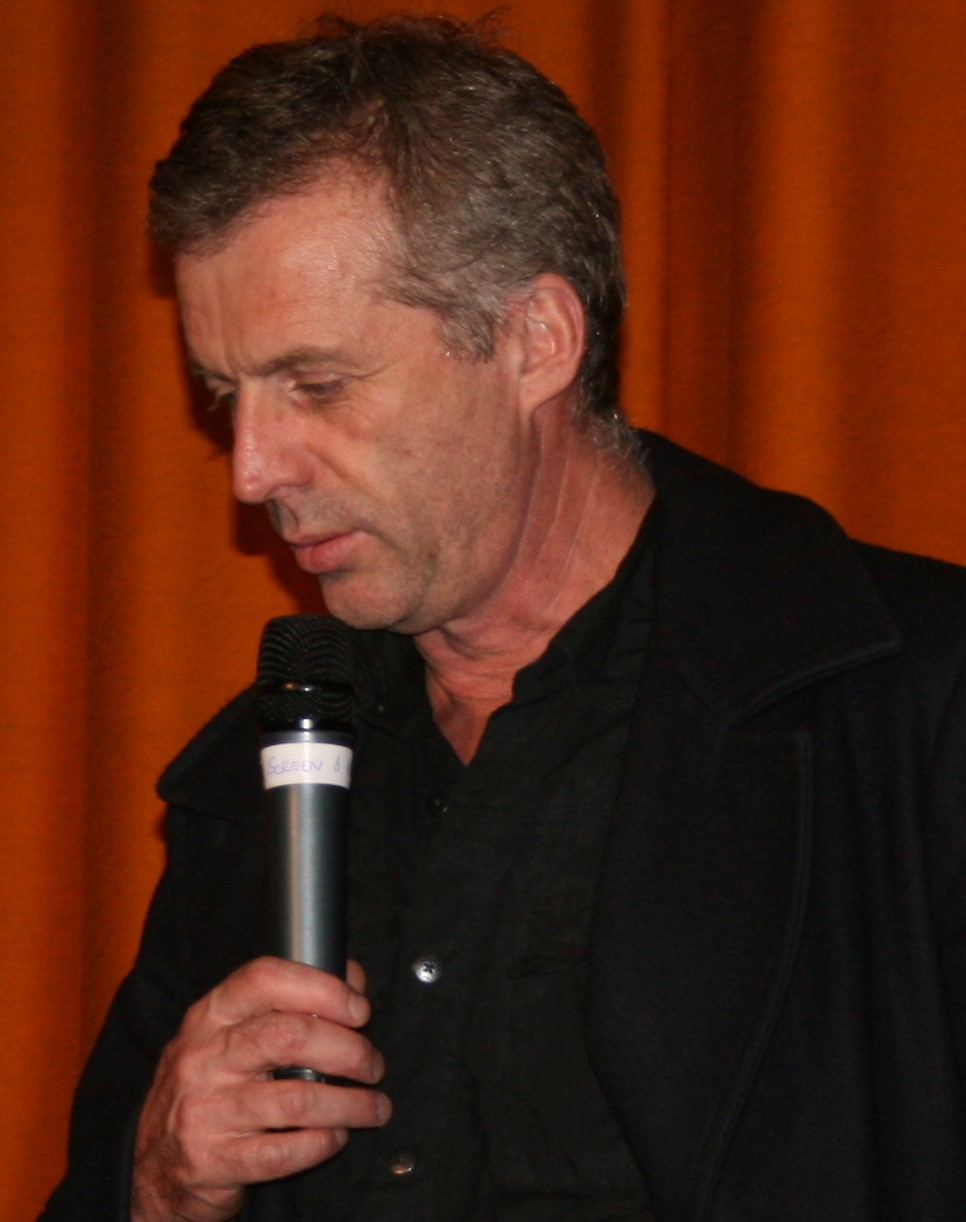
Bruno Dumont, Gran Prix winner

== Official Awards ==
=== Main Competition ===
- Palme d'Or: The Wind That Shakes the Barley by Ken Loach
- Grand Prix: Flanders by Bruno Dumont
- Best Director: Alejandro González Iñárritu for Babel
- Best Screenplay: Pedro Almodóvar for Volver
- Best Actress: Chus Lampreave, Yohana Cobo, Carmen Maura, Lola Dueñas, Blanca Portillo, Penélope Cruz for Volver
- Best Actor: Jamel Debbouze, Samy Naceri, Sami Bouajila, Roschdy Zem, Bernard Blancan for Days of Glory
- Prix du Jury: Red Road by Andrea Arnold

=== Un Certain Regard ===
- Prix Un Certain Regard: Luxury Car by Wang Chao
- Un Certain Regard Special Jury Prize: Ten Canoes by Rolf de Heer
- Prix d'interprétation féminine: Dorotheea Petre in The Way I Spent the End of the World
- Prix d'interprétation masculine: Ángel Tavira in The Violin
- Prix du Président du Jury Un Certain Regard: Murderers by Patrick Grandperret

=== Cinéfondation ===
- First Prize: Ge & Zeta by Gustavo Riet
- Second Prize: Mr. Schwartz, Mr. Hazen & Mr. Horlocker by Stefan Mueller
- Third Prize:
  - Mother by Siân Heder
  - Le virus by Ágnes Kocsis

=== Caméra d'Or ===
- 12:08 East of Bucharest by Corneliu Porumboiu

=== Short Films Competition ===
- Short Film Palme d'Or: Sniffer by Bobbie Peers
- Jury Prize: Primera nieve by Pablo Aguero
  - Special Mention: Conte de quartier by Florence Miailhe

== Independent Awards ==
=== FIPRESCI Prizes ===
- Climates by Nuri Bilge Ceylan (In competition)
- Bug by William Friedkin (Directors' Fortnight)
- Paraguayan Hammock by Paz Encina (Un Certain Regard)

=== Vulcan Award of the Technical Artist ===
- Stephen Mirrione for editing Babel

=== Prize of the Ecumenical Jury ===
- Babel by Alejandro González Iñárritu
  - Special Mention: Retrieval by Sławomir Fabicki

=== Award of the Youth ===
- Bled Number One by Rabah Ameur-Zaïmeche

=== Critics' Week ===
- Grand prix de la semaine de la critique: Les amitiés maléfiques by Emmanuel Bourdieu
- Prix SACD:
  - Pingpong by Matthias Luthardt
  - Les amitiés maléfiques by Emmanuel Bourdieu
- Prix Acid: The Bothersome Man by Jens Lien
- Prix de la toute jeune critique: Pingpong by Matthias Luthardt
- Grand Rail d'or: Les amitiés maléfiques by Emmanuel Bourdieu

=== Directors' Fortnight ===
- Prix Art and Essay: Along the Ridge by Kim Rossi Stuart
- Prix Regard Jeune: Day Night Day Night by Julia Loktev
- Label Europa Cinéma: 12:08 East of Bucharest by Corneliu Porumboiu
- Prix SACD best french-language short: Dans le rang by Cyprien Vial
- Prix Gras Savoye: Un rat by Bosilka Simonovitch

=== Prix François Chalais ===
- Days of Glory by Rachid Bouchareb

== Media ==
- INA: List of winners of the 2006 Festival (commentary in French)
