= 1914 in animation =

Events in 1914 in animation.

== Events ==
- Raoul Barré and Bill Nolan develop the peg and slash system, to respectively keep animated drawings in the exact same order and place, and to keep background drawings and character drawings separate. They also establish their own studio, Barré-Nolan, which is the first animation studio in history.
- J.R. Bray establishes his own studio, J.R. Bray Productions, pioneering the factory system in animation.

=== February ===
- February 18: Winsor McCay releases Gertie the Dinosaur, a landmark in full-blown animation and character animation.

== Films released ==
- 10 January – Colonel Heeza Liar's African Hunt (United States)
- 18 February – Gertie the Dinosaur (United States)
- 14 March – Colonel Heeza Liar Shipwrecked (United States)
- 18 April – Colonel Heeza Liar In Mexico (United States)
- 18 May – Colonel Heeza Liar, Farmer (United States)
- 15 August – Colonel Heeza Liar, Explorer (United States)
- 26 September – Colonel Heeza Liar In The Wilderness (United States)
- 24 October – Colonel Heeza Liar, Naturalist (United States)
- 21 November – The Police Dog (United States)

== Births ==
=== January ===
- January 27: Bill Littlejohn, American animator (Van Beuren Studio, Tom & Jerry, Walter Lantz, Jay Ward Productions, Animation Inc., Fine Arts Films, The Ink Tank, Peanuts specials), (d. 2010).
- January 29: Susi Weigel, Austrian illustrator, comics artist and animator, (d. 1990).

=== February ===
- February 6: Thurl Ravenscroft, American actor and singer (voice of Monstro the Whale in Pinocchio, the alligator in Lady and the Tramp, Tony the Tiger in the animated ads, Paul Bunyan in Paul Bunyan, Captain in One Hundred and One Dalmatians, singer of You're A Mean One, Mr. Grinch in How the Grinch Stole Christmas!, Billy Bass in The Aristocats, Kirby in The Brave Little Toaster), (d. 2005).
- February 9: Bill Justice, American animator (Walt Disney Animation Studios), (d. 2011).

=== March ===
- March 4: Ward Kimball, American animator (Walt Disney Company), and one of Disney's Nine Old Men, (d. 2002).
- March 15: Joe E. Ross, American actor (voice of Oxx in The Adventures of Robin Hoodnik, Botch in Help!... It's the Hair Bear Bunch!, Sergeant Flint in Hong Kong Phooey, Officer Gunther Toody in the Wait Till Your Father Gets Home episode "Car 54", Roll in CB Bears, Daniel in No Man's Valley), (d. 1982).
- March 22: Sonny Burke, American composer (Lady and the Tramp), (d. 1980).

=== April ===
- April 7: Nikolay Fyodorov, Russian animator, film director and cartoonist (co-directed The Snow Queen), (d. 1994).
- April 9: Joaquim Muntañola, Spanish animator and comics artist (Gonzalez the Fakir), (d. 2012).
- April 11: Norman McLaren, Scottish-American animator, film director and producer (Neighbours, Rythmetic, Blinkity Blank, Pas de deux), (d. 1987).
- April 20: Betty Lou Gerson, American actress (narrator in Cinderella, voice of Cruella de Vil in One Hundred and One Dalmatians), (d. 1999).

=== May ===
- May 12: Joy Batchelor, English animator, film producer and director (Halas & Batchelor, Animal Farm, the animated music video of Love Is All by Roger Glover), (d. 1991).
- May 16: Reg Hill, English model-maker, animator, and producer (worked for Gerry Anderson), (d. 1999).
- May 19: Maurice Rapf, American screenwriter (Walt Disney Animation Studios, Gnomes), (d. 2003).
- May 21: John Hubley, American animator, film director, producer, screenwriter and comics artist (Walt Disney Animation Studios, UPA and Sesame Street), (d. 1977).
- May 30: Milt Neil, American comics artist and animator (The Walt Disney Company, Walter Lantz), (d. 1997).

=== June ===
- June 3: Roy Glenn, American actor (voice of Br'er Frog in Song of the South, Uncle Tom in Uncle Tom's Bungalow), (d. 1971).
- June 11: Gerald Mohr, American actor (voice of Mister Fantastic in Fantastic Four, Green Lantern in The Superman/Aquaman Hour of Adventure), (d. 1968).
- June 17: Manuel Perez, Mexican-American animator and director (Warner Bros. Cartoons, Bill Melendez Productions, DePatie-Freleng, Hanna-Barbera, Fritz the Cat), and comics writer, (d. 1981).
- June 24: Paul Julian, American animator, background artist (My Little Pony: The Movie, Ferngully: The Last Rainforest, sound effects artist (Warner Bros. Cartoons), and voice actor (voice of Road Runner), (d. 1995).

=== July ===
- July 3: George Bruns, American composer (Walt Disney Animation Studios), (d. 1983).
- July 11:
  - Hal Adelquist, American animator, animation producer and storyboard writer (Walt Disney Company), (d. 1981).
  - Irving Spector, American animator and comics artist (Fleischer Studios, Hanna-Barbera), (d. 1977).
- July 23: Evelyn Lambart, Canadian animator and film director (co-directed Begone Dull Care, and A Chairy Tale), (d. 1999).

=== August ===
- August 9: Martin Taras, American comics artist and animator (Fleischer Studios, Famous Studios, Hanna-Barbera, Terrytoons, Ralph Bakshi), and character designer (Baby Huey), (d. 1994).
- August 14: Boris Dyozhkin, Russian film director, caricaturist and animator (Cipollino, Fitil), (d. 1992).
- August 15: Carl Brandt, American musician (The Dick Tracy Show, The Famous Adventures of Mr. Magoo, Tom & Jerry), (d. 1991).
- August 26: Richard Thompson, American animator and film director (Warner Bros. Cartoons, MGM, Hanna-Barbera, DePatie-Freleng Enterprises, Bill Melendez), (d. 1998).

=== September ===
- September 3: Willis Pyle, American animator (Walt Disney Company, Walter Lantz, UPA, Peanuts specials, co-creator of Mr. Magoo), (d. 2016).
- September 26: Jack LaLanne, American fitness & nutrition guru and motivational speaker (voiced himself in The Simpsons episode "The Old Man and the 'C' Student"), (d. 2011).

=== October ===
- October 6: Robert C. Bruce, American voice actor (narrator of various Looney Tunes and Merrie Melodies cartoons), (d. 2003).
- October 28: Dody Goodman, American actress (voice of Miss Miller in Alvin and the Chipmunks), (d. 2008).

=== November ===
- November 6: Jonathan Harris, American actor (voice of Professor Jones in Freakazoid!, Manny in A Bug's Life, Geri the Cleaner in Toy Story 2, Count Blogg in Rainbow Brite, Grumblebee in Pinocchio and the Emperor of the Night, Sunflower in Happily Ever After, Athos in The Three Musketeers, Lance Lyons in Foofur, the Devil in The Mask, Stickley Rickets in Channel Umptee-3, Era in Buzz Lightyear of Star Command, the title character in The Bolt Who Screwed Christmas, Phineas Sharp in the Darkwing Duck episode "In Like Blunt", Miles Warren in the Spider-Man episode "The Return of Hydro-Man", Ajed Al-Gebraic in the Aladdin episode "Destiny on Fire", Lord Gargan in the Mighty Ducks episode "The Final Face Off"), (d. 2002).
- November 11: Mel Leven, American composer and lyricist (wrote "Cruella de Vil" for One Hundred and One Dalmatians), (d. 2007).
- November 22: Frank Graham, American radio presenter and actor (voice of the Big Bad Wolf in Droopy, the Mouse in Slap Happy Lion and King-Size Canary, the title characters in The Fox and the Crow, the Lion in Jerry and the Lion, narrator in Chicken Little and The Three Caballeros), (d. 1950).

=== December ===
- December 1: Michel Douay, French comics artist, illustrator and animator (worked for Paul Grimault's studio) (d. 2010).
- December 19: Mel Shaw, American animator (Walt Disney Company), (d. 2012).
- December 20: Charles McKimson, aka Chuck McKimson, American animator and comics artist (Warner Bros. Cartoons), (d. 1999).
- December 21: Eustace Lycett, British special effects artist (Walt Disney Company), (d. 2006).
- December 27: Jack Bradbury, American animator and comics artist (Walt Disney Company, Warner Bros. Cartoons), (d. 2004).
- December 30: Nicolai Shutorev, American singer (singing voice of Giovanni Jones in the Looney Tunes cartoon "Long-Haired Hare"), (d. 1948).

=== Specific date unknown ===
- Chad Grothkopf, American comics artist and animator (Walt Disney Company, Fleischer Studios, Hanna-Barbera, DePatie-Freleng, Chuck Jones, Jay Ward, Terrytoons, Tiny Toon Adventures), (d. 2005).
- Oscar Conti, aka Oski, Argentine cartoonist, caricaturist, animator and comics artist (The First Foundation of Buenos Aires), (d. 1979).
- Phil DeLara, American animator and comics artist (Warner Bros. Cartoons), (d. 1973).
