= Jean-Louis Morin (dancer) =

Canadian choreographer (1953–1995)

Jean-Louis Morin (1953 – 24 May 1995) was a Canadian choreographer and the principal dancer for the Martha Graham Dance Company.

Born in Val-David, Quebec, he made his debut with the Groupe de la Place Royale in Montreal, then with the Toronto Dance Theatre in Toronto, Ontario.

He was introduced to experimental cinema via the Canadian filmmaker Norman McLaren's short musical film Narcissus, for which he was the principal actor/dancer as the beautiful Narcissus.

Know also as a painter and sculptor, he died of complications from AIDS, according to a friend, Doneley Meris.

== Films ==
- Narcissus as "Narcissus" (1983)
