= Graphical sound =

Sound recording from images drawn on film or paper

Graphical sound or drawn sound (Fr. son dessiné, Ger. graphische Tonerzeugung; It. suono disegnato) is a sound recording created from images drawn directly onto film or paper that were then played back using a sound system. There are several different techniques depending on the technology employed, but all are a consequence of the sound-on-film technology and based on the creation of artificial optical polyphonic sound tracks on transparent film.

== History ==
The first practical sound-on-film systems were created almost simultaneously in the USSR, USA and Germany. In Soviet Russia Pavel Tager initiated the first developments in 1926 in Moscow.

In 1927, just over a few months later, Alexander Shorin started his research in Leningrad. The popular version of his “Shorinophone”, widely used for field and studio sound recording, was based on a mechanical reproduction of gramophone-like longitudinal grooves along the filmstrip. Another version of Shorin’s system – “Kinap”, mainly used for sound-on-film production, was based on a variable area optical recording on film – “transversal” recording as it was called in Russia.

As far back as 1916, in the article “Upcoming Science of Music and the New Era in the History of Music”, Arseny Avraamov proclaimed his view on the future of the Art of Music: “By knowing the way to record the most complex sound textures by means of a phonograph, after analysis of the curve structure of the sound groove, directing the needle of the resonating membrane, one can create synthetically any, even most fantastic sound by making a groove with a proper structure of shape and depth".

In October 1929 the first film-roll of Piatiletka. Plan velikih rabot ("Plan of Great Works") movie by A. Room was developed. The group working on this film included the painter, book illustrator and animator Mikhail Tsekhanovsky as well as inventor and engineer Evgeny Sholpo. But the most notable participant in the project was Arseny Avraamov - composer, journalist, music theorist, inventor, performance instigator, irreconcilable foe of the classical twelve tone system (based on well-tempered scale), promoter of the ultrachromatic “Welttonsystem”, developer of experimental musical instruments and tools, and author of the storied Symphony of Factory Sirens.

The crew members were amazed with the view of the first sound track they ever saw and Mikhail Tsekhanovsky had voiced the idea: “what if we take some Egyptian or ancient Greek ornaments as a sound track, perhaps we will hear some unknown archaic music?”. Each crew member immediately recognized in the new optical film sound process a means to effectively realize their long-standing ideas: Arseny Avraamov - to develop further his concept of ultrachromatic “Welttonsystem” and to explore the sonic qualities of new ornamental sound; Evgeny Sholpo – to develop his “performer-less” musical tools. The next day they were already furiously at work on experiments in what they referred to variously as “ornamental”, "drawn," “paper”, “graphical”, “artificial” or "synthetic" sound.

On the 20th of February, 1930, just a few months later, Arseny Avraamov mentioned a new trend in his lecture for the sound-on-film group at ARRK (Avraamov 1930). In October, 1930 a new technique was described in the article “Multiplikacia Zvuka” (the Animation of Sound) by E. Veisenberg (Veisenberg 1930).

At exactly the same time similar efforts were being undertaken in Germany by Rudolf Pfenninger in Munich and, c. 1931-32, by Oskar Fischinger in Berlin. According to Oskar Fischinger’s statements from his article “Sounding Ornaments”, first published in German in 1932 and distributed worldwide, “Between ornament and music persist direct connections, which means that Ornaments are Music. If you look at a strip of film from my experiments with synthetic sound, you will see along one edge a thin stripe of jagged ornamental patterns. These ornaments are drawn music - they are sound: when run through a projector, these graphic sounds broadcast tones of a hitherto unheard of purity, and thus, quite obviously, fantastic possibilities open up for the composition of music in the future”.

According to an article published in 1931, Avraamov’s approach was similar: “Composer Arseny Avraamov at the scientific-research institute conducts the interesting experiments on a creation of the hand-drawn music. Instead of common sound recording on film by means of microphone and photocell, he simply draws on paper geometrical figures, then photographing them on sound track of the filmstrip. Afterwards this filmstrip is played as a common movie by means of film projector. Being read by photocell, amplified and monitored by loudspeaker, this filmstrip turns out to contain a well-known musical recording, while its timbre is impossible to relate to any existing musical instrument.

Comrade Avraamov conducts now a study in recording of more complicated geometrical figures. For instance, to record graphical representations of the simplest algebraic equations, to draw molecular orbits of some chemical elements. In this research composer is assisted by a group of young employee of the Research Institute for Film and Photo. By the end of December Avraamov will finish his new work and to show it to the film-community. Quite possibly the listening of the abstracts of “Hand Drawn Music” will be organized in radio broadcast" (Kino 1931).

== National Film Board of Canada ==
In the 1950s, National Film Board of Canada animators Norman McLaren and Evelyn Lambart, and film composer Maurice Blackburn, began their own experiments with graphical sound, adapting the techniques of Pfenninger and Russian artist Nikolai Voinov. McLaren created a short 1951 film Pen Point Percussion, demonstrating his work. The next year, McLaren completed his most acclaimed work, his Academy Award-winning anti-war film Neighbours, which combined stop-motion pixilation with a graphical soundtrack. Blinkity Blank is a 1955 animated short film by Norman McLaren, engraved directly onto black film leader, combining improvisational jazz along with graphical sounds. In 1971, McLaren created his final graphical sound film Synchromy.

== See also ==
- Variophone
- ANS synthesizer
- Daphne Oram
- Drawn-on-film animation, its analogue in animation.
- Oramics
- Pattern playback
