= Neighbours (1952 film) =

1952 Canadian film

- Theatrical release poster
- French: Voisins
- Directed by: Norman McLaren
- Written by: Norman McLaren
- Produced by: Norman McLaren
- Starring: Grant Munro; Jean-Paul Ladouceur
- Cinematography: Wolf Koenig (photography)
- Music by: Norman McLaren
- Distributed by: National Film Board of Canada
- Release date: January 1, 1952
- Running time: 8 minutes
- Country: Canada

Neighbours (French: Voisins) is a 1952 Canadian anti-war film by Scottish-Canadian filmmaker Norman McLaren made for the National Film Board of Canada. At the 25th Academy Awards, it was nominated for Best Live Action, Short Subject and won Best Documentary, Short Subject.

== Plot ==
Two men, Jean-Paul Ladouceur (French Canadian) and Grant Munro (English Canadian) live peacefully in adjacent cardboard houses. When a single, small flower blooms between their houses, they fight each other to the death over the ownership of that flower.

The film ends with a moral, shown in multiple languages:

- Japanese: 同胞に親切なれ (Dōhō ni shinsetsu nare)
- Chinese: 親善鄰居 (Qīnshàn línjū)
- Hindi: आपके पड़ोसी से प्रेम पूर्वक व्यवहार कीजिए (Aapke parosii ke prem porvak vyavahaar kiijie)
- Urdu: اپنے ہمساءے دوستانی برتاؤ کرؤ (Aapne hamsaae dostaani bartaao karo)
- Arabic: اَحِب قَرِيبَك (Ahib qaribak)
- Hebrew: וְאָהַבְתָּ לְרֵעֲךָ (V'ahavta l'reacha)
- Russian: Любите ближнего своего (Lyubite blizhnego svoyego)
- Esperanto: Amu vian najbaron
- Norwegian: Elsk din nabo
- Spanish: Ama a tu prójimo
- German: Liebe deinen Nächsten
- Italian: Amate il prossimo
- French: Aimez votre prochain
- English: Love your neighbour

== Cast ==
- Grant Munro as the neighbour on the right
- Jean-Paul Ladouceur as the neighbour on the left

== Production ==
The film uses pixilation, an animation technique using live actors as stop motion objects. McLaren created the soundtrack of the film by scratching the edge of the film, creating various blobs, lines, and triangles which the projector read as sound. Wolf Koenig served as cameraman on the film.

== Anti-war message ==
Neighbours has been described as "one of the most controversial films the NFB ever made". The eight-minute film was politically motivated:

"I was inspired to make Neighbours by a stay of almost a year in the People's Republic of China. Although I only saw the beginnings of Mao's revolution, my faith in human nature was reinvigorated by it. Then I came back to Quebec and the Korean War began. (...) I decided to make a really strong film about anti-militarism and against war." — Norman McLaren

The version of Neighbours that ultimately won an Oscar was not the version McLaren had originally created. In order to make the film palatable for American and European audiences, he was required to remove a scene in which the two men, fighting over the flower, murder each other's wife and children. During the Vietnam War, public opinion changed, and McLaren was asked to reinstate the sequence. The original negative of that scene had been destroyed, so the scene was salvaged from a positive print of lower quality.

NFB founder John Grierson, who had invited McLaren to the NFB to form its first animation unit, would ultimately disparage Neighbours and McLaren's attempt at political cinema:

"I wouldn't trust Norman around the corner as a political thinker. I wouldn't trust Norman around the corner as a philosophic thinker. That's not what Norman is for. Norman is for Hen Hop. Hen Hop. That's wonderful. And so many other things. That's his basic gift. He's got joy in his movement. He's got loveliness in his movement. He's got fancy in his changes. That's enough."

== Pixilation ==
The term 'pixilation' was coined by Grant Munro to describe stop-motion animation of humans in his work with McLaren on Two Bagatelles, a pair of short pixilation films made prior to Neighbours. During one brief sequence, the two actors appear to levitate, an effect achieved by having the actors repeatedly jump upward and photographing them at the top of their trajectories.

McLaren followed Neighbours with two other films using a similar combination of pixilation, live action, variable speed photography and string puppets. The first, A Chairy Tale (1957) was a collaboration with Claude Jutra and Ravi Shankar. The second, Opening Speech by Norman McLaren (1960) was made for the International Film Festival of Montreal, and starred McLaren himself.

== Awards ==
Year	Award	Category	Result
1953	25th Academy Awards	Academy Award for Best Documentary, Short Subject (Note: A 2005 press release issued by AMPAS states that Neighbours is "among a group of films that not only competed, but won Academy Awards in what were clearly inappropriate categories".)	Won
1953	25th Academy Awards	Academy Award for Best Live Action, Short Subject	Nominated
1953	Boston Film Festival	Award of Merit, Adult Education	Won
1953	5th Canadian Film Awards	Honourable Mention	Won
1953	Salerno Film Festival	Gulf of Salerno Grand Trophy	Won
1954	Yorkton Film Festival	Third Award, Sociology	Won
1955	International Review of Specialized Cinematography	Certificate of Honour	Won
1957	International Review of Specialized Cinematography	Diploma of Honour	Won
1967	Golden Gate International Film Festival	Redwood Award for Special Merit, Film as Communication	Won
1968	Calvin Workshop Awards	Notable Film Award	Won

== Honours ==
Neighbours was designated as a "masterwork" by the Audio-Visual Preservation Trust of Canada, a charitable non-profit organization dedicated to promoting the preservation of Canada's audio-visual heritage.

In 2009, Neighbours was added to UNESCO's Memory of the World International Register, listing the most significant documentary heritage collections in the world.

== See also ==
- History of Canadian animation
- List of stop-motion films
- List of Canadian films
- List of Quebec films
- List of films featuring hallucinogens
