= Boogie-Doodle =

- Directed by: Norman McLaren
- Produced by: Norman McLaren
- Music by: Albert Ammons
- Distributed by: National Film Board of Canada (NFB)
- Release date: 1940
- Running time: 4 minutes
- Country: Canada
- Language: none

Boogie-Doodle is a 1941 drawn-on-film visual music short by Norman McLaren, set to the boogie-woogie music of African-American jazz pianist Albert Ammons.

Though released by the National Film Board of Canada (NFB) in 1941, Boogie-Doodle was actually made by McLaren in New York City in 1940, a year before he was invited by John Grierson to Canada to found the NFB's animation unit. McLaren, who had been influenced by the hand-painted films of Len Lye, was in New York exploring the technique on a grant from the Solomon Guggenheim Foundation, creating Boogie-Doodle along with three other cameraless films: Dots, Loops and Stars and Stripes.

The animation in Boogie-Doodle coincides exactly with Ammon's musical piece, with McLaren's animation beginning at the very first bar and concluding at the final note.
