= Drawn-on-film animation =

Animation technique

An animation with scratched figures and hand-painted sections

Drawn-on-film animation, also known as direct animation or animation without camera, is an animation technique where footage is produced by creating the images directly on film stock, as opposed to any other form of animation where the images or objects are photographed frame by frame with an animation camera.

== History ==
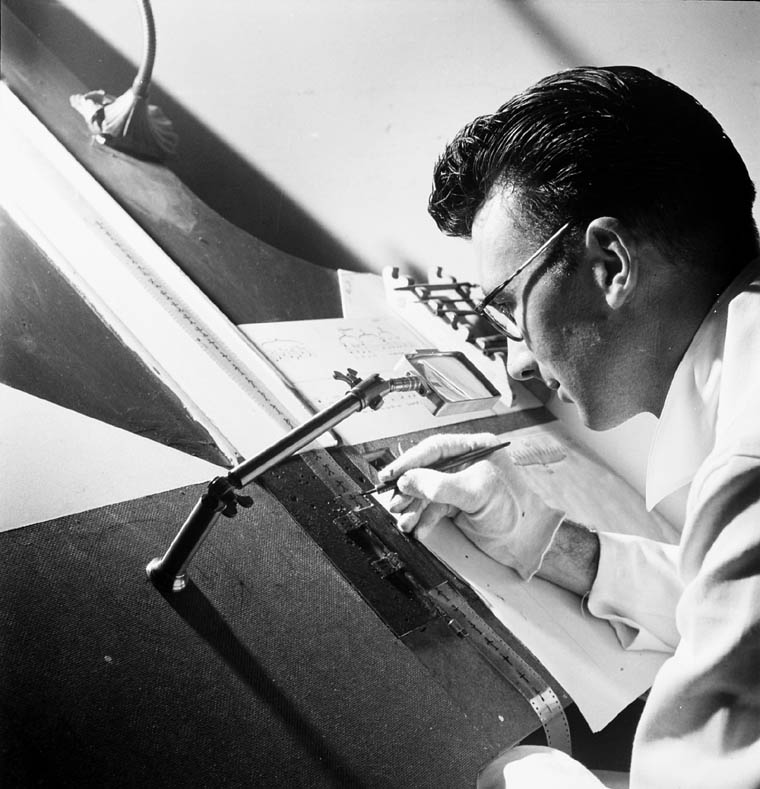
Norman McLaren drawing on film

The first and best known practitioners of drawn-on-film animation include Len Lye, Norman McLaren, Stan Brakhage, then later artists including Steven Woloshen, Richard R. Reeves, Scott Fitzpatrick and Baerbel Neubauer, who produced numerous animated films using these methods. Their work covers the whole span between narrative and totally abstract animation. Other filmmakers in the 1960s expanded the idea and subjected the film stock to increasingly radical methods, up to the point where the film was destroyed in the process projection. Some artists made this destruction a statement, others went back one step and copied the original work film strip to get a projection copy.

Direct animation can be an inexpensive way to produce a film; it can even be done on outtakes, or discarded film strips from other projects. It is a form of animation that is inviting to beginners and accomplished artists alike. Norman McLaren wrote a short illustrated introduction "How to make animated movies without a camera" which was originally published by UNESCO in 1949. Helen Hill published a collection called Recipes for Disaster that includes a wide range of approaches to creating images directly on film.

== Techniques ==
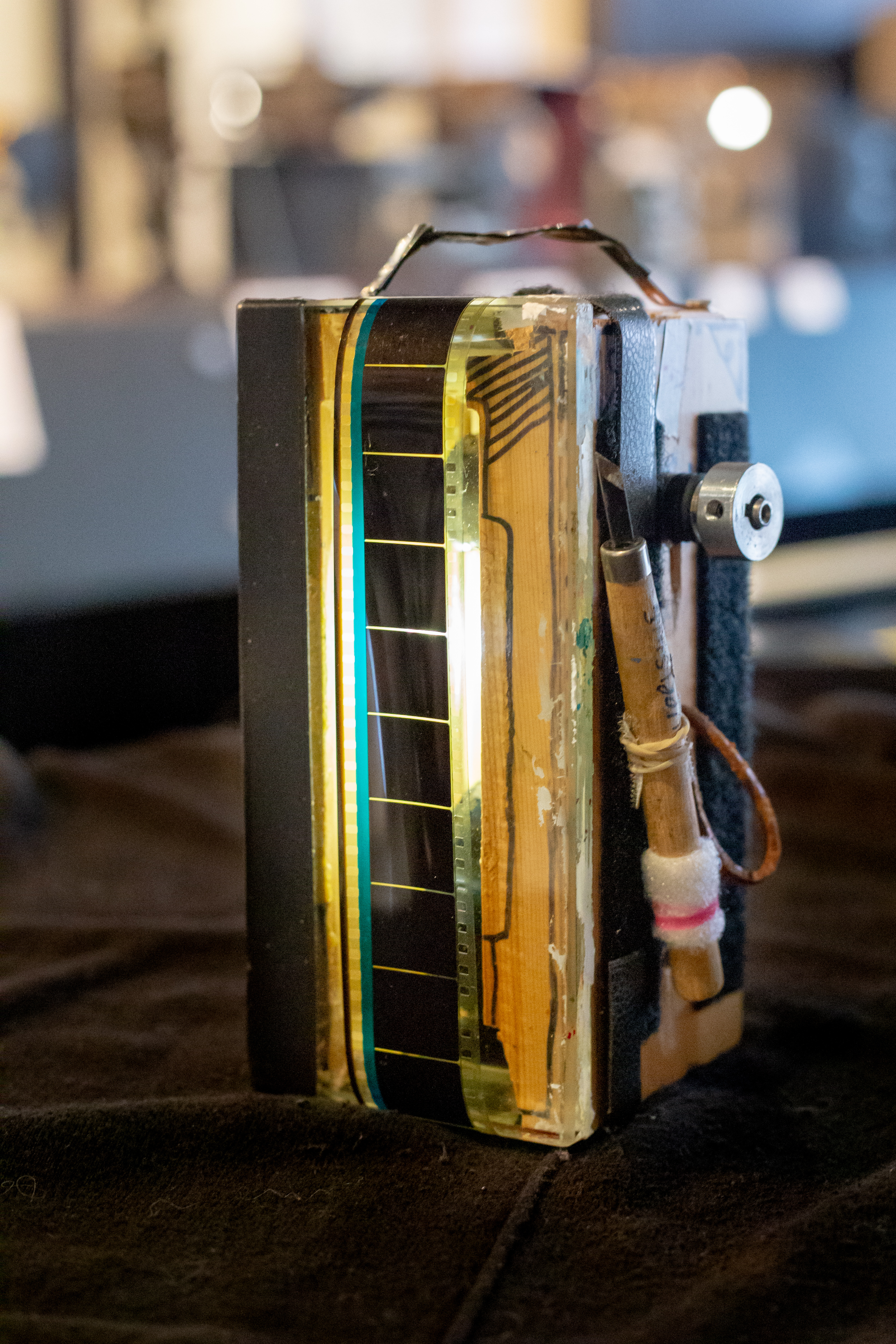
A portable box used by Steven Woloshen to scratch the film stock

There are two basic methods to produce animation directly on film. One starts with blank film stock, the other one with black (already developed) film. On blank film the artist can draw, paint, stamp, or even glue or tape objects. Black film (or any footage) can be scratched, etched, sanded, or punched. Any tool the artist finds useful may be used for this, and all techniques can be combined endlessly. The frame borders may be observed or completely ignored, found footage may be included, any existing image might be distorted by mechanical or chemical means. A third method takes place in a darkroom, using unexposed film that is exposed frame by frame. The artist places objects onto the fresh stock and then uses a small light beam to create the images. This third category of work has to be sent to a lab and processed, just like films created with a camera.

Large formats such as 70 or 35mm film may be preferred for their relatively larger working area, but direct animation is done on 16 mm or even Super 8 mm film as well. Since the sound strip on 35 mm film is optical, it is possible to create synthetic sound as well as images by drawing or otherwise reproducing forms in the soundtrack area.

== Animators and films ==
- In 1912, Italian futurists Arnaldo Ginna and Bruno Corra discuss their nine abstract films (eight of which are now lost) in their text Abstract Cinema – Chromatic Music.
- In 1916, American concert pianist Mary Hallock-Greenewalt produced hand-painted film strips, possibly intended for projection in her color organ, Sarabet.
- In 1926 Man Ray created Emak Bakia, which includes sequences made by exposing film directly to light.
- In 1935 Len Lye created the first direct film screened to a general audience, a promotion for the British General Post Office entitled A Colour Box as well as his movie Kaleidoscope. Lye and Norman McLaren produced hand-painted films for John Grierson in the GPO Film Unit. Lye went on to create direct films in New York.
- Beginning in 1941, McLaren continued this work at the National Film Board of Canada (NFB), founding the NFB's animation unit. NFB direct films created or co-created by McLaren include Boogie-Doodle (1941), Hen Hop (1942), Begone Dull Care (1949) and Blinkity Blank (1955).
- In 1946, Harry Smith produced hand-painted films in San Francisco which screened at the Art in Cinema series at the San Francisco Museum of Art.
- 1961 – "O Átomo Brincalhão" by Brazilian animator Roberto Miller. He worked at the National Film Board of Canada and later hosted a TV show about animation.
- In 1970, José Antonio Sistiaga exhibited the first feature-length hand-painted film, the silent epic ... era erera baleibu izik subua aruaren ..., in Madrid.
- Stan Brakhage, Mothlight (1963)
- Harry Everett Smith
- Rose Bond
- Julian Antonisz
- John Paizs, Ho Down (1976)
- Robert Swarthe, Ink, Paint, Scratch (1979)
- Pierre Hébert, Memories of War (1982)
- Chel White, Metal Dogs of India (1985)
- Mati Kütt, Labyrinth (1989)
- 1991 Caroline Leaf – The Two Sisters
- Steven Woloshen produced and directed Ditty Dot Comma (2001) and Cameras Take Five (2003)
- Richard Reeves
- Naomi Uman, "removed" and "Hand Eye Coordination"
- Sesame Street segments

== Bibliography ==
- Robert Russett, Cecile Starr: Experimental Animation: Origins of a New Art (1988), ISBN 0-306-80314-3
- Malcolm LeGrice, Abstract Film and Beyond. [MIT Press, 1979]
- The Dream of Color Music, And Machines That Made it Possible
- Michael Betancourt, Mary Hallock-Greenewalt: The Complete Patents. [Wildside Press, 2005]
- Tess Takahashi. "'Meticulously, Recklessly Worked-Upon': Materiality in Contemporary Experimental Animation", The Sharpest Point: Animation at the End of Cinema. Edited by Chris Gehman & Steve Reinke. Toronto: YYZ Press, 2006. 66–178.
- George Griffin. "Concrete Animation." animation: an interdisciplinary journal Vol 2(3)[2007]:259–274
