= Julian Antonisz =

Polish filmmaker, artist, animator, screenwriter, composer and inventor

Julian Antonisz (November 8, 1941 – January 31, 1987), born Julian Józef Antoniszczak, was a Polish avant-garde filmmaker, artist, film animator, screenwriter, composer, and inventor.

== Biography ==
Julian Antoniszczak was born November 8, 1941 and was the older brother fo director and writer Ryszard Antoniszczak. He graduated from the Faculty of Painting and Graphic Art of the Krakow Academy of Fine Arts in 1965. Two years later he debuted with his first animated film Phobia (Fobia in Polish). Antonisz became known as a Polish promoter of a unique animation technique called direct animation produced by creating images directly on film stock i.e. "non-camera". Antoniszczak's Sun: A Non-Camera Film 1977 (Słońce - film bez kamery) was his first all non-camera movie, although the technique has been used also in Antonisz's earlier productions. The idea after the technique was to paint or scratch the images directly onto the movie tape instead of using a camcorder. Usually one second of movie uses 24 frames. For example, his debut film Phobia 1967, lasts 11 minutes. 660 seconds times 24 frames gives us 15,840 images that had to be painted.

Antonisz, famous for his mechanical skills, has constructed numerous accessories supporting the creation of non-camera movies. His own "Antoniszograf fazujący" was a machine which scratched a set of frames, with a fluid frame by frame transition between the following images. Another invention was his prototype of a "chropograf" (which could loosely be translated as texture-graph), which created an image with distinctive levels of roughness, allowing the blind to recognize shapes presented on the picture.

His most awarded work was How the Miniature Dachshund Works, 1971 (Jak działa jamniczek).

== Filmography ==
year	title	awards
1967	Fobia	
1968	W szponach sexu	1969 (Tours)
1970	Jak to się dzieje...	
1970	Jak nauka wyszła z lasu	1971 (Poznań)
1971	Jak działa jamniczek	1972 (Kraków, Katowice, Mannheim)
1971	Tysiąc i jeden drobiazgów	
1973	Strachy na lachy	
1973	Te wspaniałe bąbelki w tych pulsujących limfocytach	
1974	Kilka praktycznych sposobów na przedłużenie sobie życia	
1975	Film o sztuce biurowej	
1975	Bajeczka międzyplanetarna	
1976	Film grozy	
1977	Katastrofa	
1978	Słońce – film bez kamery	
1978	Ludzie więdną jak liście	
1978	Dziadowski blues non-camera, czyli nogami do przodu	1980 (Zakopane)
1978	Co widzimy po zamknięciu oczu i zatkaniu sobie uszu	
1979	Ostry film zaangażowany	1980 (Kraków)
1980	Pan Tadeusz. Księga I. Gospodarstwo	Ministra Kultury i Sztuki)
1980	Dokument animowany non-camera czyli reżyser Krzysztof Gradowski o sobie	
1981–1986	Polska Kronika Non-camerowa, nr 1–12	1982] (Kraków), 1984 (Oberhausen), 1987 (Szefa Kinematografii)
1983	Dodatkowe wole trawienne magistra Kiziołła	
1984	Oberhausen, Duisburg, Düsseldorf, Dortmund, Hanower, Hamburg, czyli non-camerowy reportaż z podróży po Republika Federalna Niemiec Republice Federalnej Niemiec	
1985	Czyżby wolny rynek w organizmie biologicznym?	
1986	Światło w tunelu	1986 (Oberhausen), 1987 (Szefa Kinematografii)
