= Narcissus (1983 film) =

- Directed by: Norman McLaren
- Produced by: Derek Lamb; Douglas Macdonald; David Verrall
- Starring: Jean-Louis Morin; Sylvie Kinal; Sylvain Lafortune
- Cinematography: David De Volpi
- Music by: Maurice Blackburn
- Distributed by: National Film Board of Canada
- Release dates: 1983; 1987 (re-released)
- Running time: 22 minutes
- Country: Canada
- Budget: $702,607

Narcissus is a 1983 Canadian short musical and experimental film directed by Norman McLaren and produced by David Verrall, visualizing the legend of Narcissus in a modern way. It was produced for the National Film Board of Canada.

== Cast ==
- Jean-Louis Morin as "Narcissus"
- Sylvie Kinal as "Nymph"
- Sylvain Lafortune as "A friend"

== Production ==
The film had a budget of $702,607 (equivalent to $1,899,820 in 2023).

== Awards ==
- International Film Festival of India, New Delhi: Golden Peacock for Best Short Film of the Festival, 1984
- Dance on Camera Festival, New York: Gold Star Award, 1984
- Yorkton Film Festival, Yorkton: Golden Sheaf for Best Experimental Film, 1984
- American Film and Video Festival, New York: Honorable Mention, Visual Essays, 1984
- Columbus International Film & Animation Festival, Columbus, Ohio: Honorable Mention, 1984
- Cartagena International Film Festival, Murcia, Spain: Special Mention 1985
- International Romantic Film Festival, Divonne-les-Bains: First Prize/Madame de Stael Prize, 1985

== Works cited ==
- Evans, Gary (1991). In the National Interest: A Chronicle of the National Film Board of Canada from 1949 to 1989. University of Toronto Press. ISBN 0802027849.
