= The Prisoner (1955 film) =

1955 film

- U.S. half sheet poster
- Directed by: Peter Glenville
- Written by: Bridget Boland
- Based on: The Prisoner; 1954 play by Bridget Boland
- Produced by: Vivian A. Cox
- Starring: Alec Guinness; Jack Hawkins
- Cinematography: Reginald Wyer
- Edited by: Frederick Wilson
- Music by: Benjamin Frankel
- Color process: Black and white
- Production companies: London Independent Producers; Facet Productions
- Distributed by: Columbia Pictures
- Release dates: 19 April 1955 (London); 11 December 1955 (United States)
- Running time: 94 minutes
- Country: United Kingdom
- Language: English

The Prisoner is a 1955 British black-and-white psychological thriller film directed by Peter Glenville and based on the play of the same name by Bridget Boland. It stars Alec Guinness and Jack Hawkins. Although controversial at the time of its release, the film received five nominations at the 9th British Academy Film Awards: Best Film From Any Source, Best British Film, Best British Screenplay, and Best British Actor (for both Guinness and Hawkins).

== Plot ==
In the aftermath of World War II, in an unnamed European country where communist tyranny has recently replaced Nazi tyranny (possibly Hungary or Poland), the government falsely accuses a popular cardinal of treason. His interrogator, an old associate of the cardinal in the resistance to the Nazi occupation who is now a loyal communist, is given the task of persuading the cardinal to make a public confession. Because the cardinal had withstood torture when he opposed the Nazis, the interrogator knows he will not be able to use force to get him to make a false confession, so he intends to do it by using more psychological means and attempting to undermine the cardinal's certainty in the righteousness of his resistance to the state.

At first, the interrogator makes no progress with his interviews. This leads government authorities to grow impatient and try to trick the cardinal with fake evidence, but the cardinal is easily able to deal with these clumsy attempts, which leave the state prosecutors humiliated. The interrogator uses sleep deprivation, relentless questioning, and the deliberate upsetting of the cardinal's eating and sleep/wake patterns to weaken him. Between his interviews with the interrogator, the cardinal and the lowly jailer who brings him food philosophize about religion and politics.

The interrogator eventually breaks the cardinal's will by using extended solitary confinement, and is able to use the cardinal's innate humility to make him "realize" that he became a priest out of selfishness and vanity and to escape his childhood poverty, not out of goodness, virtue, or benevolence, as everyone (including the cardinal himself) has always believed. To purge himself of his perceived sin, in the show trial that follows, the cardinal confesses to every lie of which he is accused, including collaborating with the Nazis, though, privately, he looks to God, rather than the court, for forgiveness.

On the day of his execution, the cardinal is informed by the interrogator that his sentence has been commuted, likely to avoid any remaining possibility that he will become a martyr. Although he figures the state thinks he will kill himself, and he tells the interrogator that he had come to take some solace in the thought of his imminent death, the cardinal says he will not take his own life. The interrogator offers to shoot the cardinal and say he tried to escape, but the cardinal says he cannot ask the interrogator to commit murder, and the interrogator is moved. The cardinal leaves the prison and walks through the waiting, silent crowd, whose feelings toward him are left unknown.

A romantic sub-plot involves a young guard at the prison, who is in love with a married girl, who wants to leave the country to join her husband, who has left due to the political situation.

== Cast ==
- Alec Guinness as The Cardinal
- Jack Hawkins as The Interrogator
- Wilfrid Lawson as The Jailer
- Raymond Huntley as The General
- Jeanette Sterke as The Girl
- Ronald Lewis as The Guard
- Kenneth Griffith as The Secretary
- Mark Dignam as The Governor
- Gerard Heinz as The Doctor

== Production ==
The character of the Cardinal in The Prisoner was based on Hungarian cardinal József Mindszenty (1892–1975), who was convicted after a show trial in Hungary, as well as on Croatian cardinal Aloysius Stepinac (1898–1960), who was tried and convicted in Croatia. As a result of the similarities to Stepinac, the film was not shown in Yugoslavia until after the fall of the communist government.

The film was shot in England, and at Ostend and Bruges in Belgium. Ronald Lewis had a small role.

== Reception ==
The Prisoner generated controversy at the time of its release. While, in Ireland, it was seen by some as "pro-Communist", in France, where it was prohibited from being shown at the Cannes Film Festival, the film was labelled "anti-Communist", and it was banned from the Venice Film Festival due to its being considered "so anti-Communist that it would be offensive to Communist countries". Some in Italy saw the film as "anti-Catholic", but, despite this, it was given an award by the International Catholic Office of the Cinema and commended by Cardinal Bernard Griffin.

The Monthly Film Bulletin wrote: "Peter Glenville, who produced the play on the stage, shows extreme accomplishment in his film debut. The pace is slow, controlled, certain; there is an admirable precision about the handling of the dialogue scenes, and a consistently maintained low-key atmosphere. (Only the colourless love story, and the anonymous glimpses of the city outside – dancing to concertina music in a café, picturesque upturned peasant faces in church – are conventionally realised.) It is possible to feel that the style, so to speak, over-estimates the play and creates an occasional portentousness; but, within its limits, an excellent concentration is achieved. Alec Guinness, repeating his stage performance, builds up a soberly convincing portrait of the Cardinal, and Jack Hawkins brings an oleaginous power to the Interrogator."

Variety called it "grim".

The New York Times called The Prisoner a "grim and gripping drama—which also happens to be an equally revealing motion picture, one of the best of the year", and a "film that will make you shiver—and think."

The Radio Times, while praising the two main performances in the film, said that "Peter Glenville's theatrical direction won't do much to persuade those without religious or political convictions to become involved".

TV Guide wrote more positively of the film's staginess, writing that it is "basically a photographed stage play, and although there are a few other actors, Hawkins and Guinness are centre stage most of the time—their mano a mano a delight to watch. Director Glenville had to use all of his expertise to keep the film from being little more than talking heads but his touch is sure".

== Soundtrack ==
In 2006 the films soundtrack was released on a CD Album along with the music from the films The Curse of the Werewolf, So Long at the Fair and The Net.
