= 12:08 East of Bucharest =

2006 Romanian film

- Theatrical release poster
- Romanian: A fost sau n-a fost?
- Directed by: Corneliu Porumboiu
- Written by: Corneliu Porumboiu
- Produced by: Corneliu Porumboiu; Daniel Burlac
- Starring: Mircea Andreescu; Teodor Corban; Ion Sapdaru
- Cinematography: George Dăscălescu
- Edited by: Roxana Szel
- Music by: Rotaria
- Distributed by: Tartan USA
- Release dates: 24 May 2006 (Cannes); 29 September 2006
- Running time: 89 minutes
- Country: Romania
- Language: Romanian
- Box office: $523,703

12:08 East of Bucharest (Romanian: A fost sau n-a fost?; lit. 'Was it or was it not?') is a 2006 Romanian film directed by Corneliu Porumboiu, released in 2006 and winner of the Caméra d'Or Prize (for best first film) at the Cannes Film Festival. It was also released in the United States under the abridged titles East of Bucharest and 12:08 Bucharest. The film is set in a small Romanian town far away from the capital city of Bucharest, and centers on a group of characters who revisit the Romanian Revolution of 1989 which brought an end to the communist regime.

The full English title refers to the setting of the film and the time of day at which Romanian dictator Nicolae Ceaușescu fled following the revolution, 12:08 pm on 22 December 1989. The original Romanian title roughly translates to "Was it, or was it not?", referring to the film's central issue: did Vaslui have any part in the 1989 revolution? The answer depends on whether the city registered any protest before the moment of Ceaușescu's flight.

== Plot ==
A few years after the fall of the Communist regime, some inhabitants of a city discuss how to celebrate the anniversary of the event. They then decide to organise a television broadcast on a local broadcaster and make a celebratory talk show, involving people by telephone.

Virgil Jderescu, director of the local television station, wants to organise a live talk show to answer a question: has there been a revolution in this city? Did people take to the streets before or after Ceaușescu's escape? If they took to the streets later, then it is not about the Revolution but about celebrations.

But the two expected guests decline the commitment, perhaps because the topic is more thorny than Jderescu thinks. But he manages to overcome those absences and invites two other people. The first is Tiberiu Manescu, a drunkard and penniless professor who has always boasted that he was the first in town to challenge the men of the dictator. The other guest is Emanoil Piscoci, a rigorous and paranoid old man who at that time used to dress up as Moș Gerilă for children.

The broadcast begins and Professor Manescu proudly exposes his experience as a revolutionary, but immediately two viewers call live denying his presence in the square that day and accusing him of speaking under the influence of alcohol, without however having evidence that Manescu really lies. The calm confrontation begins to become embarrassing when Manescu, unnerved, begins to blurt out the flaws of some local "notables", including the same editor/presenter Virgil Jderescu who apparently is not a journalist but a textile engineer on loan to television. The talk-show, initially feel-good and formal, takes a grotesque and scurrile turn, given that even the elderly Piscoci, hitherto silent, pretends to be a "philosopher" of the situation and begins to say nonsense in bursts.

== Cast ==
- Mircea Andreescu as Emanoil Pișcoci
- Teodor Corban as Virgil Jderescu
- Ion Sapdaru as Tiberiu Mănescu
- Mirela Cioabă as Doamna Mănescu
- Luminița Gheorghiu as Doamna Jderescu
- Cristina Ciofu as Vali
- Lucian Iftime as Lică
- Annemarie Chertic as Vera
- Petrică Sapdaru as Petrică
- Cătălin Paraschiv as Barman
- George Guoqingyun as Chen
- Constantin Diță as Tibi
- Daniel Badale as Professor
- Marius Rogojinski as Vecin (credited as Marius Rogojinschi)
- Aurelia Țocu as Maricica Dima (voice only)

== Reception ==
The American review aggregator Rotten Tomatoes reported that 96% of critics gave the film positive reviews, based on 47 reviews with an average rating of 7.79/10. The website's critics consensus reads: "With a witty script full of satirical overtones and dry humor, 12:08 East of Bucharest is a thoroughly enjoyable Romanian comedy." Metacritic reported the film had an average score of 77 out of 100, based on 15 reviews.

The film has garnered positive press in the United States; J. Hoberman of The Village Voice called it, "a casually bleak and neatly structured ensemble comedy—at once deadpan and bemused." Noel Murray of The A.V. Club said "the story and the situation are slight, but in the best possible way." Richard Brody of The New Yorker called it a "wise and gentle comedy of political realism." Wendy Ide of The Times described the film as "one of the best of the new wave of Romanian cinema" and "a droll delight that questions the nature of historical record and the realities of postcommunist Romania with a slyly comic and disarmingly self-mocking tone." It also received 4 stars out of 4 from the New York Post.

V.A. Musetto of the New York Post named 12:08 East of Bucharest the best film of 2007. A. O. Scott of The New York Times named it the 6th best film of 2007 (along with Live-In Maid).

== See also ==
- Romanian New Wave
