= 9th British Academy Film Awards =

1956 film awards ceremony

- Date: 1 March 1956
- Site: Odeon Leicester Square
- Hosted by: Vivien Leigh

Highlights
- Best Film: Richard III
- Best British Film: Richard III
- Most awards: Richard III (3)
- Most nominations: The Prisoner (5)

The 9th British Academy Film Awards, given by the British Academy of Film and Television Arts in 1956, honoured the best films of 1955.

== Winners and nominees ==
=== Best Film ===
Richard III

- Bad Day at Black Rock
- Carmen Jones
- The Colditz Story
- The Dam Busters
- East of Eden
- The Ladykillers
- Marty
- The Night My Number Came Up
- The Prisoner
- Seven Samurai
- Simba
- La Strada
- Summertime

=== Best British Film ===
Richard III

- The Colditz Story
- The Dam Busters
- The Ladykillers
- The Night My Number Came Up
- The Prisoner
- Simba

=== Best Documentary ===
Foothold in Antarctica

- Generator 4
- The Silent World (Le Monde Du Silence)
- Under the Same Sky

=== Best Foreign Actor ===
Ernest Borgnine in Marty

- James Dean in East of Eden
- Jack Lemmon in Mister Roberts
- Frank Sinatra in Not as a Stranger
- Toshirō Mifune in Seven Samurai
- Takashi Shimura in Seven Samurai

=== Best British Actor ===
Laurence Olivier in Richard III

- Alfie Bass in The Bespoke Overcoat
- Kenneth More in The Deep Blue Sea
- Michael Redgrave in The Night My Number Came Up
- Jack Hawkins in The Prisoner
- Alec Guinness in The Prisoner

=== Best British Actress ===
Katie Johnson in The Ladykillers

- Margaret Lockwood in Cast a Dark Shadow
- Deborah Kerr in The End of the Affair
- Margaret Johnston in Touch and Go

=== Best Foreign Actress ===
Betsy Blair in Marty

- Dorothy Dandridge in Carmen Jones
- Grace Kelly in The Country Girl
- Julie Harris in I Am a Camera
- Marilyn Monroe in The Seven Year Itch
- Judy Garland in A Star Is Born
- Giulietta Masina in La Strada
- Katharine Hepburn in Summertime

=== Best British Screenplay ===
The Ladykillers - William Rose

=== Best Animated Film ===
Blinkity Blank

- Animal Farm
- Down a Long Way
- Fudget's Budget
- Lady and the Tramp
- Magoo Express

=== Special Award ===
The Bespoke Overcoat

- Mr Mensah Builds a House
- The Steps of Age

=== Most Promising Newcomer to Film ===
Paul Scofield in That Lady

- Jo Van Fleet in East of Eden

=== United Nations Award ===
Children of Hiroshima

- Bad Day at Black Rock
- Escapade
- Simba
