= Rythmetic =

1956 film

- Directed by: Norman McLaren; Evelyn Lambart
- Produced by: Norman McLaren
- Cinematography: Norman McLaren; Evelyn Lambart
- Distributed by: NFBC
- Release date: 19 January 1956
- Running time: 8 minutes, 25 seconds
- Country: Canada
- Languages: English, French

Rythmetic is a 1956 Canadian short animated film directed by Norman McLaren and Evelyn Lambart for the National Film Board of Canada.

It is a non-verbal lecture on the subject of mathematics and one of McLaren's longest animated works.

McLaren wanted to make a truly international film about the inadequacies of communication between peoples of different cultures and languages. To this end, he used the most understood method of communication, Arabic numerals.

Filmed without a camera or microphone and using McLaren's scratch sound system, the film is a 'crazy dance' of mechanical actions and anthropomorphic gestures made by arithmetical figures and symbols; we hear rhythmic music with clicks or scratching sounds made by ink directly painted on the soundtrack. The filling of the background with bright figures against a dark background evoke a classroom blackboard and the teaching process. Classified as an educational film, it is also regarded as a visual and auditory work of art.

== Awards ==
- 6th Berlin International Film Festival, Berlin: Silver Bear, Short Films, 1956
- Edinburgh International Film Festival, Edinburgh: Diploma of Merit, 1956
- Rapallo International Film Festival, Rapallo, Italy: First Prize, Abstract Films, 1957
- International Review of Specialized Cinematography, Rome: Diploma of Honour, 1957
- Chicago Festival of Contemporary Arts, University of Illinois Chicago: First Prize 1957
- Golden Reel International Film Festival, Film Council of America, New York: Silver Reel Award, Avant-Garde and Experimental, 1957
- Durban International Film Festival, Durban: Certificate of Merit, 1957
- Johannesburg International Film Festival, Johannesburg: Certificate of Merit, 1957
