= Retrieval (film) =

- Directed by: Sławomir Fabicki
- Written by: Sławomir Fabicki; Denijal Hasanovic; Marek Pruchniewski
- Produced by: Lukasz Dzieciol; Piotr Dzieciol
- Starring: Marek Bielecki
- Cinematography: Bogumil Godfrejow
- Edited by: Jarosław Kamiński
- Release date: 17 November 2006
- Running time: 103 minutes
- Country: Poland
- Language: Polish

Retrieval (Polish: Z odzysku) is a 2006 Polish film directed by Sławomir Fabicki. It was Poland's submission to the 79th Academy Awards for the Academy Award for Best Foreign Language Film, but was not accepted as a nominee. It was also screened in the Un Certain Regard section at the 2006 Cannes Film Festival.

== Cast ==
- Marek Bielecki – Badylarz
- Jacek Braciak – Gazda
- Michal Filipiak – Baton
- Olga Frycz – Teenager
- Katarzyna Lecznar – Badylarz's Daughter
- Eryk Lubos
- Andrzej Mastalerz – Elves Producer
- Dimitri Melnichuk – Andrij
- Jowita Miondlikowska – Gazda's Wife
- Antoni Pawlicki – Wojtek
- Dorota Pomykała – Mother
- Jan Pyrlik – Gazda's Son
- Grzegorz Stelmaszewski – Janek
- Karolina Tokarek – Gazda's Daughter
- Jerzy Trela – Grandpa
- Natalya Vdovina – Katia
- Danuta Widuch-Jagielska – Badylarz's Wife
- Wojciech Zielinski – Kalafior

== See also ==
- List of submissions to the 79th Academy Awards for Best Foreign Language Film
