= Sławomir Fabicki =

Polish film director

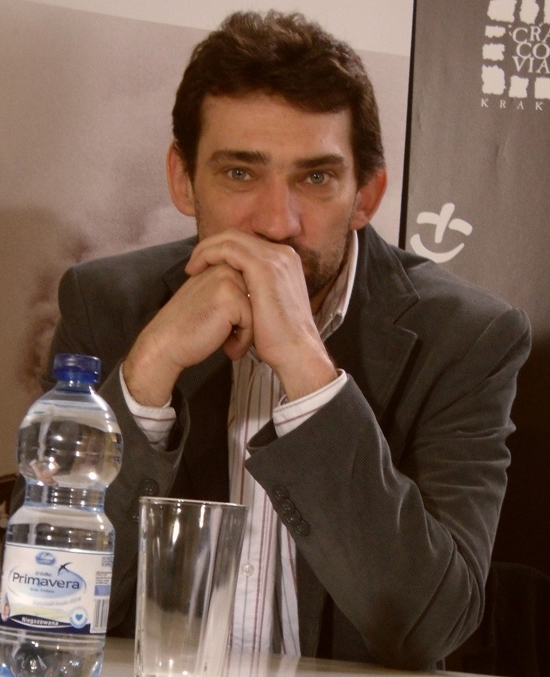
- Fabicki in April 2011
- Born: 5 April 1970 (age 56); Warsaw, Poland
- Occupations: Film director, screenwriter
- Years active: 1997–present

Sławomir Fabicki (born 5 April 1970) is a Polish film director and screenwriter. His film Z odzysku was screened in the Un Certain Regard section at the 2006 Cannes Film Festival.

== Filmography ==
- Wewnętrzny 55 (1997)
- Bratobójstwo (1999)
- Męska sprawa (2001)
- Z odzysku (2006)
- Miłość (2012)
- Angel of Death (2020)
