= Synchromy =

- Directed by: Norman McLaren
- Produced by: Norman McLaren
- Cinematography: Ron Moore (optical effects)
- Production company: National Film Board of Canada
- Distributed by: National Film Board of Canada
- Release date: 1971
- Running time: 7:27
- Country: Canada

Synchromy (French: Synchromie) is a 1971 National Film Board of Canada visual music film by Norman McLaren utilizing graphical sound. To produce the film's musical soundtrack, McLaren photographed rectangular cards with lines on them. He arranged these shapes in sequences on the analog optical sound track to produce notes and chords. He then reproduced the sequence of shapes, colorized, in the image portion of the film, so that audiences see the shapes that they are also hearing, as sound.

McLaren had experimented with this technique for creating notes through patterns of stripes on the soundtrack area of the film in the 1950s, working with Evelyn Lambart. Their technique was based on earlier work in graphical sound by German pioneer Rudolf Pfenninger and Russian Nikolai Voinov.

The creation of Synchromy was documented by Gavin Millar in a 1970 film called The Eye Hears, The Ear Sees. In McLaren's production notes, he stated that "Apart from planning and executing the music, the only creative aspect of the film was the “choreographing” of the striations in the columns and deciding on the sequence and combinations of colours."

The film received eight awards, including a Special Jury Mention at the Annecy International Animated Film Festival.
