= Pas de deux (film) =

- Directed by: Norman McLaren
- Starring: Margaret Mercier; Vincent Warren
- Cinematography: Jacques Fogel
- Distributed by: National Film Board of Canada (NFB)
- Release date: 1968
- Running time: 13 minutes
- Country: Canada
- Budget: $15,000

Pas de deux (released as Duo in the United States) is a 1968 short dance film by Norman McLaren, produced by the National Film Board of Canada.

== Production ==
Pas de deux is choreographed to Romanian pan pipe music by Ludmilla Chiriaeff. Ballerina Margaret Mercier dances by herself (or rather, with images of herself), before being joined by Vincent Warren to perform the pas de deux of the title.

It was filmed in a studio where the walls and floor were painted black. Lighting was from the sides, so only the dancers' silhouettes appear, and their images are repeatedly multiplied 10 times.

The film was photographed on high contrast black and white 35mm Kodak stock, with optical, step-and-repeat printing, for a sensuous and almost stroboscopic appearance.

== Awards ==
- 22nd British Academy Film Awards, London: BAFTA Award for Best Short Animation, 1969
- BFI London Film Festival, London: Outstanding Film of the Year, 1968
- Chicago International Film Festival, Chicago: Special Plaque of the Jury, 1968
- 20th Canadian Film Awards, Toronto: Special Prize for Outstanding Artistic Achievement, 1968
- FIBA International Festival of Buenos Aires, Buenos Aires: Silver Cabildo for the Most Original Film, 1968
- Cambodia International Film Festival, Phnom Penh: First Prize, Short Film, 1968
- Locarno Film Festival, Locarno, Switzerland: Diploma of Honour, 1968
- Melbourne International Film Festival, Melbourne: Grand Prize, Short Subject, 1969
- Film Critics and Journalists Association of Ceylon, Colombo, Sri Lanka: Golden Plaque, Short Film, 1969
- International Film Festival of Ballet, Nervi: Silver Orchid Award, 1969
- Yorkton Film Festival, Yorkton, Saskatchewan: First Place, Creative Art, 1969
- Colombo International Film Festival, Colombo, Sri Lanka: Honourable Mention, Short Film, 1969
- Salerno Short Film Festival, Salerno, Italy: Trophy of the Festival, 1970
- Panama International Film Festival, Panama City, Panama: Award for Best Short Film, 1970
- International Festival of Short Films, Philadelphia: Top Film of the Festival, 1971
- American Film and Video Festival, New York: Blue Ribbon, 1970
- American Film and Video Festival, New York: Emily Award, 1970
- Festival of Music and Dance, Menton: Prize of the Secretary of State to the Prime Minister in charge of Youth, Sports and Leisure, 1971
- 41st Academy Awards, Los Angeles: Nominee (as Duo): Best Live Action Short Subject, 1969

== Works cited ==
- Evans, Gary (1991). In the National Interest: A Chronicle of the National Film Board of Canada from 1949 to 1989. University of Toronto Press. ISBN 0802027849.
