= Blinkity Blank =

1955 animated short film

- Directed by: Norman McLaren
- Produced by: Norman McLaren
- Music by: Maurice Blackburn; Musicians: Bert Niosi; Lew Lewis; Gordon Day; Isaac Mamott; Perry Bauman
- Production company: National Film Board of Canada
- Distributed by: National Film Board of Canada
- Release date: 1955
- Running time: 5 minutes
- Languages: English, French

Blinkity Blank is a 1955 animated short film created by Norman McLaren for the National Film Board of Canada. It won, among other awards, both the Short Film Palme d'Or at Cannes and the BAFTA Award for Best Animated Film.

== Production ==
Engraved directly onto black film leader, Blinkity Blank features a soundtrack combining improvisational jazz from composer Maurice Blackburn along with graphical sounds created by McLaren scratching onto the film's optical soundtrack.

The film features lines, dots and other abstract forms, along with fruits, trees, planets and chickens—the latter featured at length in another McLaren hand-drawn film Hen Hop—which blink in and out of existence, or merge with or modulate other shapes. McLaren also left some frames blank, which he described as "sprinkling on the empty band of time".

== Awards ==
- Cannes Film Festival, Cannes: Short Film Palme d'Or, 1955
- 9th British Academy Film Awards, London: BAFTA Award for Best Animated Film, 1956
- Berlin International Film Festival, Berlin: Silver Bear, 1955
- Franco-American International Film Festival, Paris: Fourth Prize, 1955
- Edinburgh International Film Festival, Edinburgh: Diploma of Merit, 1955
- Cape Town International Film Festival, Cape Town: Certificate of Merit, Documentary, 1955
- Durban International Film Festival, Durban: Certificate of Merit, Documentary, 1955
- SODRE International Festival of Documentary and Experimental Films, Montevideo: First Honourable Mention, Experimental Films, 1956
