= Begone Dull Care =

- Directed by: Evelyn Lambart; Norman McLaren
- Produced by: Norman McLaren
- Edited by: Evelyn Lambart; Norman McLaren
- Music by: Oscar Peterson; Clarence Jones; Austin Roberts
- Distributed by: National Film Board of Canada
- Release date: 1949
- Running time: 7:48 minutes
- Country: Canada

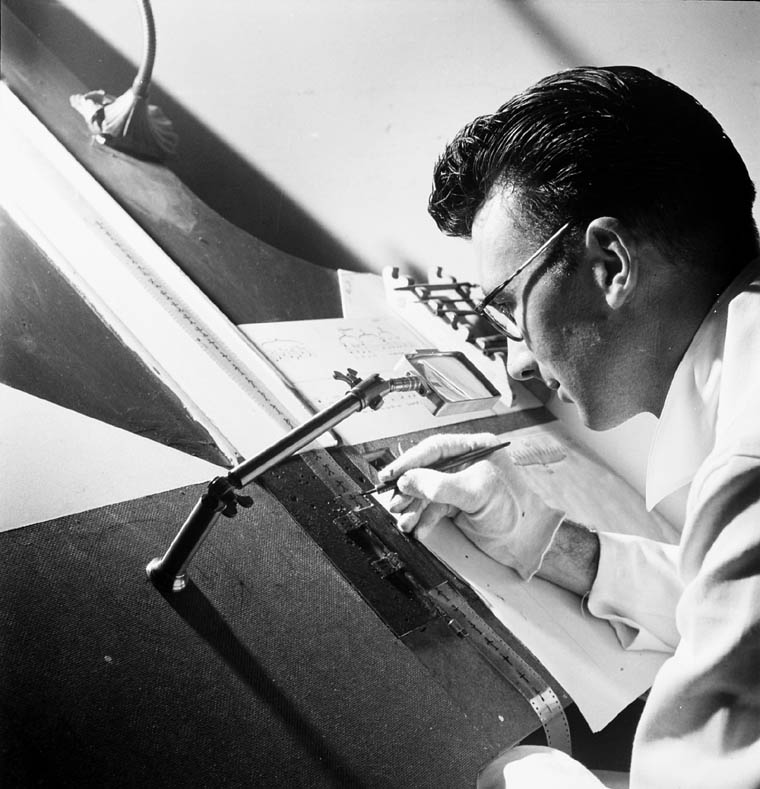
Norman McLaren drawing on film

Begone Dull Care (French: Caprice en couleurs) is a 1949 visual music animated film created by Norman McLaren and Evelyn Lambart for the National Film Board of Canada (NFB).

== Summary ==
Using drawn-on-film animation, McLaren and Lambart painted and scratched directly onto film stock to create a visual representation of Oscar Peterson's jazz music. They used the improvisatory nature of jazz to establish a narrative, allowing the animated shapes to respond and react to the music. The film demonstrates how animation techniques can experiment with lines, movement, colour, texture and visual rhythm.

To demonstrate that music is a universal language, the film opens with titles in English, French (Caprice en Couleurs), Spanish (Fantasía en Colores), Hindi (रंग बाहार; Raṅga Bāhāra), Italian (Capriccio a Colori), Russian (Красочная фанта́зия; Krasočnaja Fantázija), and German (Trübsal Ade!).

== Production ==
At the time, Oscar Peterson was 24 and new to the professional jazz world. McLaren heard his music and traveled from Ottawa to Montreal to hear him play at a club, then asked if he’d be interested in recording the music for a film. The next morning, McLaren showed him Stars and Stripes (1939), Dots (1940) and Loops (1940) and Peterson played some ideas. McLaren chose one improvisation and they worked on it together; Peterson’s ideas gave McLaren visual ideas and McLaren’s visual ideas prompted what Peterson wrote. Peterson monitored their progress by writing on the back of an envelope that lay on the piano; over the next four days, Peterson shaped the music into a form to which McLaren could animate. The group met at the recording studio two weeks later; at the time, the Oscar Peterson Trio included Austin Roberts on bass and Clarence Jones on drums. McLaren was concerned about obligating the NFB to pay royalties; the soundtrack to Begone Dull Care is not included on any of Peterson’s albums.

In their studio, McLaren and Lambart stretched a clear strip of celluloid and pinned it onto a 12’ wooden board. The recorded music was measured and drawn onto the film. An oscilloscope allowed them to see the vibrations and mark them on the film. After measuring notable passages as a visual map, they matched their configured shapes and colours to follow the benchmarked sounds. McLaren worked over a ground glass area with light shining through the glass and used an individual grid behind each frame as a reference. Both filmmakers worked directly to the film and viewed the painted strips through a moviola with the music playing in the background. They worked on short sections of the film, dividing the music into pieces and painting onto it in five-second segments. Some were painted as the moviola was moving, and a brush full of paint was 'danced' to the rhythm of the music. The dotted section in the middle of the film was made with a knife on black emulsion running through the moviola.

Each segment was checked to make sure it had captured the spirit of the music. If it had not, they repainted the images. Numerous transparent coloured dyes were used; musical accents or short phrases were emphasized by additional painting or engraving. Black film allowed them to scratch onto the film. They used India ink, watercolour, cell paint, dust, various brushes, sprayers, finely crumpled paper; netting, mesh and fine lace acted as stencils. Dust was sprinkled onto wet dye, which formed circles as it recoiled from each dust speck; black opaque paint created a crackle pattern as it dried.

These abstract shapes dance, shake, spin, and curl to the sound of Peterson’s fingers on the piano. In one instance, the sounds of the three musicians are encapsulated in a flurry of three-dimensional shapes landing on a pinkish feather; in another, a bird-like design flaps its wings in tempo. The goal was to stimulate the eye by capturing the rhythmic energy produced by sound and transferring it onto film through abstract images of colour and light.

== Awards ==
- Venice Film Festival, Venice: First Prize, Art Films, 1950
- 2nd Canadian Film Awards, Ottawa: Special Award, Experimentation, 1950
- Salerno Film Festival, Salerno, Italy: Honourable Mention, Miscellaneous Film, 1950
- 1st Berlin International Film Festival, Berlin: Silver Plaque, Documentary Short Film, 1951
- American Federation of Arts and Film Advisory Center Film Festival, Woodstock, New York: Best Experimental Film, 1952
- Durban International Film Festival, Durban: Silver Medal, Experimental, 1954

== Legacy ==
Begone Dull Care was designated and preserved as a "masterwork" by the Audio-Visual Preservation Trust of Canada, a charitable non-profit organization dedicated to promoting the preservation of Canada's audio-visual heritage. It also won a special Genie Award for experimental filmmaking.

The Canadian electronic music duo Junior Boys named their 2009 album Begone Dull Care for the film, which was reported to have influenced the conception and creation of the music.

In 2014, to celebrate McLaren on the 100th anniversary of his birth, Montreal’s entertainment district, the Quartier des spectacles, was transformed into a vast outdoor laboratory for experimental video art. Seven original video works inspired by McLaren’s films were projected on the façades of seven buildings in the district. This included The Baby Birds of Norman McLaren by Japanese artist Mirai Mizue, a film based on Begone Dull Care which depicts the metamorphosis of white animals on a coloured and animated background.
