= Norman McLaren =

Scottish Canadian animator (1914–1987)

Norman McLaren CC CQ
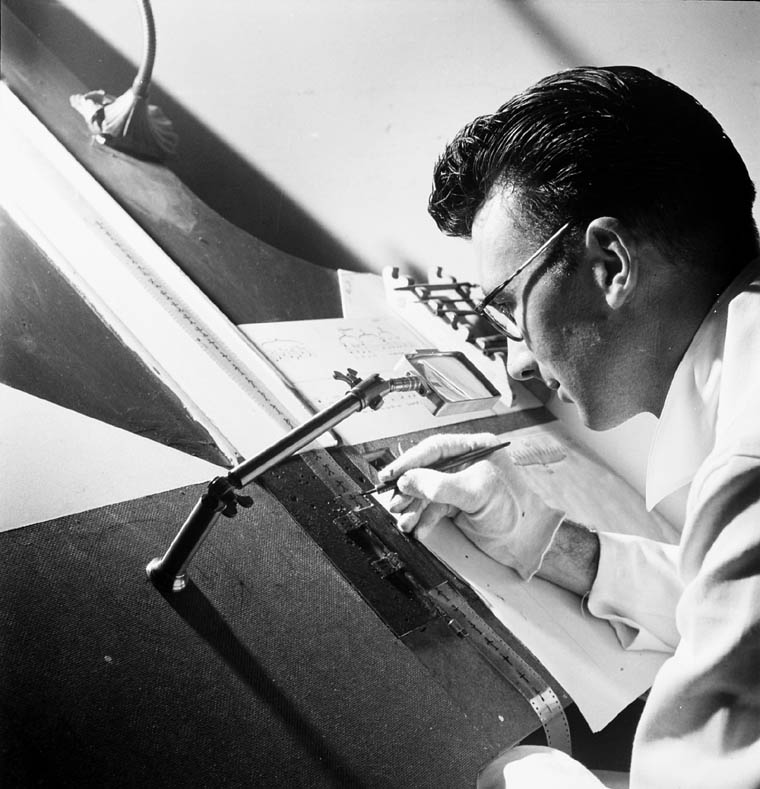
- McLaren drawing directly on film (1944)
- Born: William Norman McLaren; 11 April 1914; Stirling, Scotland
- Died: 27 January 1987 (aged 72); Hudson, Quebec, Canada
- Education: Glasgow School of Art
- Occupations: Animator, director, producer
- Years active: 1933–1985
- Known for: Filmmaking innovation, Founding the animation department of the National Film Board of Canada
- Notable work: Neighbours; Rythmetic; Pas de deux Hen Hop; Begone Dull Care; Blinkity Blank; A Chairy Tale; Christmas Cracker; Synchromy; Lines: Vertical; Mosaic; Canon; Narcissus
- Partner: Guy Glover
- Awards: Companion of the Order of Canada; Officer of the Order of Canada; Chevalier, National Order of Quebec; Prix Albert-Tessier; Doctor of Laws, honoris causa, Concordia University

William Norman McLaren (11 April 1914 – 27 January 1987) was a Scottish-Canadian animator, director and producer known for his work for the National Film Board of Canada (NFB). He was a pioneer in a number of areas of animation and filmmaking, including hand-drawn animation, drawn-on-film animation, visual music, abstract film, pixilation and graphical sound. McLaren was also an artist and printmaker, and explored his interest in dance in his films.

His films garnered numerous awards, including one Oscar, one Palme d'Or, three BAFTA Awards and six Venice Film Festival awards.

== Early life ==
Norman McLaren was born in Stirling, Scotland, on 11 April 1914. He had two older siblings, one brother, Jack and a sister, Sheena. At the age of 21, he travelled to the Soviet Union for a holiday which confirmed his communist beliefs, although his father had paid for the trip in hopes of dispelling them.

When McLaren was 22, he left Stirling and studied set design at the Glasgow School of Art. While there, he joined the Kinecraft Society; within the society, he began to experiment with different styles and techniques of filmmaking. It was also at the Glasgow School of Art that McLaren met Helen Biggar. McLaren and Biggar produced films together outside the School and sought to have their productions released nationally.

His early experiments with film and animation included actually scratching and painting the film stock itself, as he did not have ready access to a camera. One of his earliest extant films, Seven Till Five (1933), a "day in the life of an art school" was influenced by Eisenstein and displays a strongly formalist attitude.

McLaren's film Camera Makes Whoopee (1935), was a more elaborate take on the themes explored in Seven Till Five, inspired by his acquisition of a Ciné-Kodak camera, which enabled him to execute a number of 'trick' shots. McLaren used what would later be called 'pixilation' effects, superimpositions and animation not only to display the staging of an art school ball, but also to tap into the aesthetic sensations supposedly produced by this event.

His two early films won prizes at the Scottish Amateur Film Festival, where fellow Scot and future NFB founder John Grierson was a judge.

== Career ==
=== GPO Film Unit ===
Grierson, who was at that time head of the UK General Post Office film unit, saw another of his movies at an amateur film festival and hired McLaren. McLaren worked at the GPO from 1936 to 1939, making eight films including Defence of Madrid, Book Bargain (1937), Mony a Pickle, Love on the Wing (1938), and News for the Navy (1938).

=== Solomon Guggenheim Foundation ===
McLaren then moved to New York City in 1939, just as World War II was about to begin in Europe. With a grant from the Solomon Guggenheim Foundation, he worked in New York until 1941, making drawn-on-film animated works, including Boogie-Doodle (1940), along with Dots, Loops and Stars and Stripes.

=== NFB ===
In 1941, at the invitation of Grierson, McLaren moved to Ottawa to work for the National Film Board and open an animation studio and to train Canadian animators. Upon his arrival in Canada, he made two films with the American director Mary Ellen Bute—Spook Sport and Tarantella. Grierson asked him to direct a promotional film reminding Canadians to mail their Christmas cards early, Mail Early (1941). He then worked on animated shorts as well as maps for Allied propaganda documentary films, followed by his War Bonds campaign films: V for Victory (1941), 5 for 4 (1942), Hen Hop (1942), Dollar Dance (1943) and Tic Tac Toe (1943). In 1943, he also produced the six-film series of animated French songs, Chants Populaire. In 1944 and 1945, he would do a similar series in English with Let's All Sing Together.

As of 1942, McLaren could no longer keep up with the demands for animation at the fast-growing NFB, and he was asked by Grierson to recruit art students and create a small animation team, a task made more difficult because many young students had gone off to fight in the war. McLaren found recruits for his fledgling animation unit at the École des beaux-arts de Montréal and the Ontario College of Art, including René Jodoin, George Dunning, Jim McKay, Grant Munro and his future collaborator, Evelyn Lambart. McLaren trained these emerging animators, who would all work on cartoons, animated cards and propaganda documentaries before going on to make their own films. Studio A, the NFB's first animation studio, formally came into existence as of January 1943, with McLaren as its head.

During his work for the NFB, McLaren made 70 films, including Begone Dull Care (1949), Rythmetic (1956), Christmas Cracker (1963), Pas de Deux (1968), and the Oscar-winning Neighbours (1952), which is a brilliant combination of visuals and sound, and has a strong social message against violence and war. McLaren won the Short Film Palme d'Or at the Cannes Film Festival and the BAFTA Award for Best Animated Film for Blinkity Blank (1955), which he later selected as his diploma piece when he was inducted into the Royal Canadian Academy of Arts in 1974.

=== UNESCO ===
In addition to film, McLaren worked with UNESCO in the 1950s and 1960s on programs to teach film and animation techniques in China and India. His five part "Animated Motion" shorts, produced in the late 1970s, are an excellent example of instruction on the basics of film animation.

== Legacy ==
McLaren is remembered for his experiments with image and sound as he developed a number of groundbreaking techniques for combining and synchronizing animation with music. Emilio Martí López argues that McLaren's homosexuality can be found in his experimental animation, observing that his techniques of abstract and experimental animation avoid the gender binary.

The National Film Board honoured McLaren by naming its Montreal head office building the Norman McLaren Building. The Montreal borough of Saint-Laurent, which is home to the NFB, has also honoured McLaren by naming a borough district after him.

In 1979, the new Edinburgh Filmhouse included two seats dedicated to McLaren and Grierson.

In 2006, McLaren was the subject of a short animated documentary McLaren's Negatives. Also in 2006, the Film Board marked the 65th anniversary of NFB animation with an international retrospective of McLaren's restored classics and a new DVD box set of his complete works.

In June 2013, the NFB released an iTunes app entitled "McLaren's Workshop," allowing users to create their own films using animation techniques utilized by McLaren and providing access to over fifty of his films.

In June 2018, Robert Lepage, principal dancer Guillaume Côté and the National Ballet of Canada staged a ballet entitled Frame by Frame, based on McLaren's life and work.

Filmmaker George Lucas has cited McLaren as an influence on his own work.

In 2024, UK independent record label Phantom Limb and Canadian independent record label We Are Busy Bodies collaborated on a release of McLaren's musical compositions for film, making the soundtracks publicly available for the first time.

=== Birth centenary events ===
The 100th anniversary of the birth of McLaren was marked by a project entitled "McLaren Wall-to-Wall" in Montreal's Quartier des Spectacles entertainment district, with short films inspired by McLaren works Neighbours, Begone Dull Care, Synchromy and Spheres projected onto local landmarks.

McLaren's centenary was also celebrated in Scotland with the McLaren 2014 Programme of screenings, exhibitions, events and animation workshops. The Programme was conceived of and directed by animator Iain Gardner who also serves as the Animation Programmer for the Edinburgh International Film Festival. The programme was a key focus within the 68th Edinburgh International Film Festival in June, and ran through to the end of the XX Commonwealth Games in Glasgow in August. The McLaren 2014 Programme was managed by the Centre for the Moving Image, working in partnership with the National Film Board of Canada, and over 20 partners in Scotland and the UK.

In April 2014 his only surviving nephew Douglas Biggar (younger son of Sheena) unveiled a blue heritage plaque on his childhood home marking the centenary of his birth.

== Honours ==
In 1968, McLaren was made an Officer of the Order of Canada and, in 1973, Companion of the Order of Canada.

In 1954, the Locarno Film Festival included a block of programming title Homage to Norman McLaren.

In 1975, he was presented with the Winsor McCay Award in recognition of his lifetime contributions to the art of animation.

In 1977, he received an honorary doctorate from Concordia University.

In 1982, he was the first anglophone to receive the Prix Albert-Tessier, given to persons for an outstanding career in Québec cinema.

In 1985, McLaren was named Chevalier of the National Order of Quebec.

In 1986, he received a Lifetime Achievement Award at the World Festival of Animated Film – Animafest Zagreb.

In 2009, McLaren's works were added to UNESCO's Memory of the World Programme, listing the most significant documentary heritage collections in the world.

== Personal life ==
McLaren was gay. His life partner was fellow NFB director Guy Glover, whom he met at the ballet in London in 1937. They remained together until McLaren's death in 1987.

== Filmography ==
Glasgow School of Art

- Hand-Painted Abstractions, 1933 – co-director with Stewart McAllister
- Seven Till Five, 1935 – producer, director
- Camera Makes Whoopee, Glasgow School of Art 1935 – producer, director
- Polychrome Phantasy, Glasgow School of Art 1935 – producer, director
- Colour Cocktail, 1935 – producer, director
- Hell Unlimited, 1936 – co-producer and co-director with Helen Biggar

GPO Film Unit

- Defence of Madrid, 1936 – producer, co-director with Ivor Montagu
- Book Bargain, 1937 – director, co-producer with Alberto Cavalcanti
- Making a Book, 1937 – director
- A Job in a Million, Evelyn Spice Cherry 1937 – editor
- Love on the Wing, 1938 – animator, producer, director
- Mony a Pickle, 1938 – producer, co-director
- News for the Navy, 1938 – producer, director
- The Obedient Flame, 1939 – director

Independent

- Allegro, 1939 – director, animator
- Rumba, 1939 – director, animator
- Scherzo, 1939 – producer, director
- Snakes, 1940 – producer, director
- La Perdriole, 1940 – producer, director
- Little Negro, 1940 – producer, director
- NBC Valentine's Greeting, 1940 – animator, producer, director
- Stars and Stripes, 1940 – animator, producer, director
- Dots, 1940 – animator, producer, director (released 1949)
- Loops, 1940 – animator, producer, director (released 1949)
- Boogie-Doodle, 1941 – animator, producer, director
- Blue Peter, TV series, BBC 1963 – animator, 2 episodes

National Film Board of Canada

- Spook Sport, 1940 – director, co-producer with Mary Ellen Bute
- Tarantella, Mary Ellen Bute and Ted Nemeth 1940 – animation
- Mail Early, 1941 – animator, producer, director
- V is for Victory, 1941 – animator, producer, director
- July 4th, 1941 – producer, director
- Five for Four, 1942 – animator, producer, director
- Hen Hop, 1942 – animator, producer, director
- Barrel Zoom, 1943 – animator, producer, director
- En roulant ma boule, Chants populaires No. 1, Jim MacKay 1943 – producer
- Envoyons d'l'avant nos gens, Chants populaires No. 2, Jean-Paul Ladouceur and George Dunning 1943 – producer
- Là-bas sur ces montagnes, Chants populaires No. 3, Jim MacKay and George Dunning 1943 – producer
- Filez, filez, ô mon navire, Chants populaires No. 4, Jim MacKay and George Dunning 1943 – producer
- C'est l'aviron, Chants populaires No. 5, 1943 – producer, co-animator and co-director with Alexandre Alexeieff
- Là-haut sur ces montagnes, Chants populaires No. 6, 1943 – animator, producer, director
- Dollar Dance, 1943 – animator, producer, director
- Tic Tac Toe, 1943 – producer
- Alouette, 1944 – producer, co-director and co-animator with René Jodoin
- A Rainy Day, 1944 – co-producer with Philip Ragan
- Keep Your Mouth Shut, 1944 – producer, director
- Let's All Sing Together: No. 1, 1944 – producer
- Let's All Sing Together: No. 2, 1944 – producer
- Let's All Sing Together: No. 3, 1945 – producer
- Let's All Sing Together: No. 4, 1945 – producer
- Let's All Sing Together: No. 5, 1945 – producer
- Let's All Sing Together: No. 6, 1945 – producer
- Hoppity Pop, 1946 – animator, producer, director
- A Little Phantasy on a 19th-Century Painting, 1946 – animator, producer, director
- Story of a Violin, Jacques Bobet 1947 – co-animator with Evelyn Lambart
- Fiddle-de-dee, 1947 – animator, producer, director
- La poulette grise, 1947 – animator, producer, director
- Begone Dull Care, 1949 – producer, editor, co-animator and co-director with Evelyn Lambart
- Dots, 1949 – animator, producer, director
- Loops, 1949 – animator, producer, director
- Over-Dependency, Robert Anderson 1949 – animator
- Now is the Time, 1951 – animator, director, co-producer with Evelyn Lambart
- Around Is Around, 1951 – producer, director, co-animator with Evelyn Lambart
- On the Farm - Test, 1951 – director
- Pen Point Percussion, 1951 – director, co-producer with Tom Daly
- Neighbours, 1952 – music, animator, producer, director
- A Phantasy, 1952 – animator, producer, director
- Two Bagatelles, 1952 – music, animator, producer, co-director with Grant Munro
- Twirligig, 1952 – producer
- Ballet Adagio, 1953 – animator, producer, director
- Blinkity Blank, 1955 – animator, producer, director
- Rythmetic, 1956 – producer, co-director and co-animator with Evelyn Lambart
- A Chairy Tale, 1957 – producer, co-director with Claude Jutra
- Le Merle, 1958 – producer, director, co-animator with Evelyn Lambart
- The Wonderful World of Jack Paar, 1959 – titles
- Mail Early for Christmas, 1959 – animator, producer, director
- Serenal, 1959 – animator, producer, director
- Short and Suite, 1959 – director, producer, co-animator with Evelyn Lambart
- Opening Speech, 1960 – director, producer, animator
- Lines: Vertical, 1960 – producer, co-animator and co-director with Evelyn Lambart
- Flicker Film - Test, 1961 – director
- Times Square Animated Lightboard, 1961 – animator, director
- New York Lightboard, 1961 – producer, director
- Lines: Horizontal, 1962 – producer, co-animator and co-director with Evelyn Lambart
- Christmas Cracker, 1963 – co-director with Grant Munro, Gerald Potterton and Jeff Hale
- Seven Surprizes – compilation 1963 - co-director with Grant Munro, and Claude Jutra
- Canon – animated film, 1964 – co-producer and co-director with Grant Munro
- Mosaic, 1965 – producer, co-animator and co-director with Evelyn Lambart
- Korean Alphabet, Kim in Tae 1967 – sound
- Pas de deux, 1968 – producer, director
- Spheres, 1969 – co-producer, co-director and co-animator with René Jodoin
- Synchromy, 1971 – music, visuals, producer, director
- Ballet Adagio, 1972 – producer, director
- Pinscreen, 1973 – director
- Animated Motion, Parts 1–5, 1976-78 – co-director and co-producer with Grant Munro
- Narcissus, 1983 – director
- Pas de deux and the Dance of Time, 1985 – co-director with Francine Viel

== Discography ==
- Rhythmetic: The Compositions of Norman McLaren, 2024 (Phantom Limb and We Are Busy Bodies)

== Awards ==
Hen Hop (1942)

- World Festival of Film, Brussels: Special Award, 1949

A Little Phantasy on a 19th-Century Painting (1946)

- Salerno Short Film Festival, Salerno: Chamber of Commerce of Salerno Cup for Best Avant-garde Film, 1950

Fiddle-de-dee (1947)

- Salerno Short Film Festival, Salerno, Italy: First Prize, Gulf of Salerno Trophy of the Festival, 1950
- International Review of Specialized Cinematography, Rome: Certificate of Honour, Film Production in General, 1955
- International Review of Specialized Cinematography, Rome: Diploma of Honour, 1957
- World Festival of Film, Brussels: Special Award, 1949

Begone Dull Care (1949)

- Venice Film Festival, Venice: First Prize, Art Films, 1950
- 2nd Canadian Film Awards, Ottawa: Special Award, Experimentation, 1950
- Salerno Short Film Festival, Salerno: Honourable Mention, Miscellaneous Film, 1950
- Berlin International Film Festival, Berlin: Silver Medal, Documentary Short Film, 1951
- American Federation of Arts and Film Advisory Center Film Festival, Woodstock, New York: Best Experimental Film, 1952
- Durban International Film Festival, Durban: First Place, Silver Medal, Experimental, 1954

Dots (1940) and Loops (1940) (released together 1949)

- 1st Canadian Film Awards, Ottawa: Special Award for Experimental Film, 1949
- International Review of Specialized Cinematography, Rome: Diploma of Honour, 1955
- Salerno Short Film Festival, Salerno: Honourable Mention, Miscellaneous Film, 1950

Pen Point Percussion (1951)

- Venice Film Festival, Venice: Honourable Mention, Experimental Films, 1951

Now is the Time (1951)

- 4th Canadian Film Awards, Special Award for Experimental Filmmaking, 1952 (with Around Is Around)

Around Is Around (1951)

- BFI London Film Festival, London: Nominee: Best Animation, 1957
- 4th Canadian Film Awards, Special Award for Experimental Filmmaking, 1952 (with Now is the Time)

Neighbours (1952)

- 25th Academy Awards, Los Angeles: Oscar for Best Documentary, Short Subject, 1953
- Boston Film Festival, Boston: Award of Merit, Adult Education, 1953
- 5th Canadian Film Awards, Montreal: Honourable Mention, 1953
- Salerno Short Film Festival, Salerno: Gulf of Salerno Grand Trophy, 1954
- Yorkton Film Festival, Yorkton, Saskatchewan: Third Award, Sociology, 1954
- International Review of Specialized Cinematography, Rome: Certificate of Honour, 1955
- International Review of Specialized Cinematography, Rome: Diploma of Honour, 1957
- Golden Gate International Film Festival, San Francisco: Redwood Award for Special Merit, Film as Communication, 1967
- Calvin Workshop Awards, Kansas City, Missouri: Notable Film Award, 1968
- 25th Academy Awards, Los Angeles: Nominee: Best Live Action, Short Subject, 1953

A Phantasy (1952)

- Venice Film Festival, Venice: Second Prize, Experimental Films, 1952
- Boston Film Festival, Boston: First Place, Arts, 1953
- 5th Canadian Film Awards, Montreal: Special Award, Non-Theatrical, 1953

Blinkity Blank (1955)

- Cannes Film Festival, Cannes: Short Film Palme d'Or, 1955
- 9th British Academy Film Awards, London: BAFTA Award for Best Animated Film, 1956
- Berlin International Film Festival, Berlin: Silver Bear, 1955
- Franco-American International Film Festival, Paris: Fourth Prize, 1955
- Edinburgh International Film Festival, Edinburgh: Diploma of Merit, 1955
- Cape Town International Film Festival, Cape Town: Certificate of Merit, Documentary, 1955
- Durban International Film Festival, Durban: Certificate of Merit, Documentary, 1955
- SODRE International Festival of Documentary and Experimental Films, Montevideo, Uruguay: First Honourable Mention, Experimental Films, 1956

Rythmetic (1956)

- 6th Berlin International Film Festival, Berlin: Silver Bear, Short Films, 1956
- Edinburgh International Film Festival, Edinburgh: Diploma of Merit, 1956
- Rapallo International Film Festival, Rapallo, Italy: First Prize, Abstract Films, 1957
- International Review of Specialized Cinematography, Rome: Diploma of Honour, 1957
- Chicago Festival of Contemporary Arts, University of Illinois Chicago: First Prize 1957
- Golden Reel International Film Festival, Film Council of America, New York: Silver Reel Award, Avant-Garde and Experimental, 1957
- Durban International Film Festival, Durban: Certificate of Merit, 1957
- Johannesburg International Film Festival, Johannesburg: Certificate of Merit, 1957

A Chairy Tale (1957)

- Venice Film Festival, Venice: First Prize, Experimental and Avant-garde, 1957
- 11th British Academy Film Awards, London: Special BAFTA Award for "work lying outside the feature and documentary fields", 1958
- Rapallo International Film Festival, Rapallo, Italy: Second Prize, Experimental, 1958
- 10th Canadian Film Awards, Toronto: Award of Merit, Non-Theatrical, Arts and Experimental, 1958
- 30th Academy Awards, Los Angeles: Nominee: Best Live Action Short Subject, 1958

Le Merle (1958)

- SODRE International Festival of Documentary and Experimental Films, Montevideo, Uruguay: Honourable Mention, 1956
- Locarno Film Festival, Locarno, Switzerland: Diploma of Honour, 1958
- World Festival of Film, Brussels: First Prize for Best Use of Colour, 1958
- Ibero-American-Filipino Documentary Film Contest, Bilbao: Special Mention, 1959
- International Review of Specialized Cinematography, Rome: Diploma of Honour, 1959
- American Film and Video Festival, New York: Blue Ribbon, Films as Art, 1960

Short and Suite (1959)

- Venice Film Festival, Venice: CIDALC Prize, 1959
- Bergamo Film Meeting, Bergamo: Special Mention, 1959

Serenal (1959)

- Ibero-American-Filipino Documentary Film Contest, Bilbao: Special Mention, 1959
- Bergamo Film Meeting, Bergamo: Special Mention, 1959
- San Sebastián International Film Festival, San Sebastián: Special Mention, 1959

Lines: Vertical (1960)

- Venice Film Festival, Venice: First Prize, Experimental, 1960
- BFI London Film Festival, London: Outstanding Film of the Year for Presentation, 1960
- Edinburgh International Film Festival, Edinburgh: Diploma of Merit, 1960
- CIDALC Festival of Music and Dance in Film, Valencia: First Prize, 1961
- 13th Canadian Film Awards, Toronto: Best Film, Arts and Experimental, 1961

New York Lightboard (1961)

- Festival of Tourist and Folklore Films, Brussels: Special Jury Prize for Originality, 1961

Christmas Cracker (1963)

- Golden Gate International Film Festival, San Francisco: First Prize, Best Animated Short, 1964
- Electronic, Nuclear and Teleradio Cinematographic Review, Rome: Grand Prize for Technique, Films for Children, 1965
- Electronic, Nuclear and Teleradio Cinematographic Review, Rome: Grand Prize for Animation Technique, 1965
- Film Centrum Foundation Film Show, Naarden, Netherlands: Silver Squirrel, Second Prize 1966
- Philadelphia International Festival of Short Films, Philadelphia: Award of Exceptional Merit, 1967
- Landers Associates Annual Awards, Los Angeles: Award of Merit, 1965
- 37th Academy Awards, Los Angeles: Nominee: Best Short Subject – Cartoons, 1965

Canon (1964)

- Montreal International Film Festival, Montreal: First Prize, Best Animated Film, 1965
- 3rd International Film Festival of India, New Delhi: Bronze Peacock, Second Prize, 1965
- 17th Canadian Film Awards, Toronto: Genie Award for Best Film, Arts and Experimental, 1965

Mosaic (1965)

- Vancouver International Film Festival, Vancouver: Certificate of Merit, 1965
- FIBA International Festival of Buenos Aires, Buenos Aires: First Prize, 1966
- Melbourne Film Festival, Melbourne: First Prize, 1966
- American Film and Video Festival, New York: Blue Ribbon, 1966
- Calvin Workshop Awards, Kansas City, Missouri: Notable Film Award, 1966

Pas de deux (1968)

- 22nd British Academy Film Awards, London: BAFTA Award for Best Short Animation, 1969
- BFI London Film Festival, London: Outstanding Film of the Year, 1968
- Chicago International Film Festival, Chicago: Special Plaque of the Jury, 1968
- 20th Canadian Film Awards, Toronto: Special Prize for Outstanding Artistic Achievement, 1968
- FIBA International Festival of Buenos Aires, Buenos Aires: Silver Cabildo for the Most Original Film, 1968
- Cambodia International Film Festival, Phnom Penh: First Prize, Short Film, 1968
- Locarno Film Festival, Locarno, Switzerland: Diploma of Honour, 1968
- Melbourne International Film Festival, Melbourne: Grand Prize, Short Subject, 1969
- Film Critics and Journalists Association of Ceylon, Colombo, Sri Lanka: Golden Plaque, Short Film, 1969
- International Film Festival of Ballet, Nervi: Silver Orchid Award, 1969
- Yorkton Film Festival, Yorkton, Saskatchewan: First Place, Creative Art, 1969
- Colombo International Film Festival, Colombo, Sri Lanka: Honourable Mention, Short Film, 1969
- Salerno Short Film Festival, Salerno, Italy: Trophy of the Festival, 1970
- Panama International Film Festival, Panama City, Panama: Award for Best Short Film, 1970
- International Festival of Short Films, Philadelphia: Top Film of the Festival, 1971
- American Film and Video Festival, New York: Blue Ribbon, 1970
- American Film and Video Festival, New York: Emily Award, 1970
- Festival of Music and Dance, Menton: Prize of the Secretary of State to the Prime Minister in charge of Youth, Sports and Leisure, 1971
- 41st Academy Awards, Los Angeles: Nominee (as Duo): Best Live Action Short Subject, 1969

Spheres (1969)

- International Festival of Experimental and Documentary Films, Córdoba, Argentina: Special Mention, Experimental, 1970

Synchronomy (1971)

- International Week of Cinema in Colour, Barcelona: Gold Medal, 1971
- Annecy International Animation Film Festival, Annecy: Special Jury Mention, Short Films, 1971
- Philadelphia International Festival of Short Films, Philadelphia: Award of Exceptional Merit, 1971
- FIBA International Festival of Buenos Aires, Buenos Aires: Cabildo de Plata for Most Original Film, 1972
- Melbourne Film Festival, Melbourne: Silver Boomerang, 1972
- American Film and Video Festival, New York: Blue Ribbon, Experimental, 1972
- Rockville Film Festival, Rockville, Maryland: Certificate of Honour, 1972

Ballet Adagio (1972)

- Atlanta Film Festival: Silver Medal, Live Action Short, 1973
- Columbus International Film & Animation Festival, Columbus, Ohio: Bronze Plaque, Art and Culture, 1973
- Melbourne International Film Festival, Melbourne: Diploma of Merit, 1973
- Tisquesusa Dorado International Festival of Short Films, Bogotá: First Prize, Artistic Field, 1980

Animated Motion (1976)

- Athens International Film/Video Festival, Athens, Georgia: Special Merit Award, 1978

Narcissus (1983)

- International Film Festival of India, New Delhi: Golden Peacock for Best Short Film of the Festival, 1984
- Dance on Camera Festival, New York: Gold Star Award, 1984
- Yorkton Film Festival, Yorkton: Golden Sheaf for Best Experimental Film, 1984
- American Film and Video Festival, New York: Honorable Mention, Visual Essays, 1984
- Columbus International Film & Animation Festival, Columbus, Ohio: Honorable Mention, 1984
- Cartagena International Film Festival, Murcia, Spain: Special Mention 1985
- International Romantic Film Festival, Divonne-les-Bains: First Prize/Madame de Stael Prize, 1985

== See also ==
- The Critic
- René Jodoin
- Motion graphics
- Steven Woloshen
- Evelyn Lambart
- Grant Munro

== Bibliography ==
- Burant, Jim. Ottawa Art & Artists: An Illustrated History. Toronto: Art Canada Institute, 2022. ISBN 978-1-4871-0289-0
- Dominique Chateau, "Norman McLaren : pensée-cinéma et cinéplastique", Nouvelles Vues, issue 17, winter-spring 2016 : Nouvelles vues - Norman McLaren : pensée-cinéma et cinéplastique
- Raphaël Bassan, "Norman McLaren : le silence de Prométhée", in Les Cahiers de Paris expérimental, no 17 (in French) (2004)*
- Olivier Cotte (2007) Secrets of Oscar-winning animation: Behind the scenes of 13 classic short animations. (Making of Neighbours) Focal Press. ISBN 978-0-240-52070-4
- Alfio Bastiancich, "Norman McLaren: Précurseur des Nouvelles Images", Dreamland èditeur, Paris (1997) (in French) ISBN 2-910027-07-4
- Martí López, E. (2016) «El armario de McLaren: expresión y ocultación del deseo homosexual en la filmografía de Norman McLaren, a través de la reinvención del cuerpo y el espacio», Con A de animación, (6), pp. 152–173. doi: 10.4995/caa.2016.4802.
- Rogers, Holly and Jeremy Barham: The Music and Sound of Experimental Film, New York: Oxford University Press, 2017.
- Dobson, Nichola. Norman McLaren: Between the Frames. London: Bloomsbury Academic, 2019. ISBN 9781501354939.
- Burant, Jim. Ottawa Art & Artists: An Illustrated History. Toronto: Art Canada Institute, 2022. ISBN 978-1-4871-0289-0
