= A Chairy Tale =

- Directed by: Claude Jutra; Norman McLaren; Animation: Evelyn Lambart
- Produced by: Norman McLaren
- Starring: Claude Jutra
- Music by: Ravi Shankar; Chatur Lal; Maurice Blackburn
- Production company: National Film Board of Canada
- Distributed by: National Film Board of Canada
- Release dates: September 18, 1957 (United States); July 10, 1958 (Canada)
- Running time: 10 minutes
- Country: Canada

A Chairy Tale (French: Il était une chaise) is a 1957 Canadian stop-motion pixilation short film co-directed by Norman McLaren and Claude Jutra for the National Film Board of Canada. Set to the music of Ravi Shankar and Chatur Lal, it comedically portrays Jutra's attempts to sit on an uncooperative chair.

== Synopsis ==
The film begins with a seemingly normal chair onscreen. Jutra enters, carrying a book, and attempts to sit on the chair so he can read his book. The chair unexpectedly moves out from under him. The man's persistent become increasingly frenetic and violent to himself. Finally, the man realises that perhaps the chair will let him sit on it if he allows the chair to sit on him first. This gambit succeeds, resulting the man sits on the chair at the end.

== Filming ==
The film took place on one indoor scene such as an empty stage and dark curtains in the background. The animated chair method involved using the traditional string-puppet technique with the exception of attaching the string horizontally off-screen on the right side and on the left side with the help of two animators. The strings were invisible to the camera because they were fine black nylon fishing string.

The film had variables speed of frames per second (fps) whether it was 16, 12, 8, 4 or 1 fps. In order to control the chair movement and the man action at a normal speed, the camera should capture the chair at half speed, 12 frames per second, and the man at 1/2 speed. However, if the chair action was difficult to control, the camera would have to capture it at 6 fps which end up the chair moving at 1/4 speed. If the camera had to capture the chair movement at a high speed and the man at a normal speed, it would have to record the chair at 8 fps and the man at 1/3 speed. In order to maintain a balance between the camera and the man or the chair action, the result was to slow them down at the same amount of speed.

== Music ==
The background music of the film was accompanied with Indian music by Ravi Shankar, the sitar player, and Chatur Lau, the tabla player. The two musicians were invited to view the film after they had arrived in Montreal for a television recital. They were intrigued, and decided to compose music for the film. Since the film was already edited, McLaren split the film into two about ten loops and recorded the music into each of these loops. He added 20 seconds of silence in the loop for synchronizing the music and the performance.

== Analysis ==
One interpretation of the film is that cooperation is a better option to resolve disputes rather than force. If one side of the party is willing to use violence and aggression in order to achieve their path, the result will end poorly. The lesson is to listen and to see the other party's point of view in order to solve the situation.

Another interpretation of the film is that it is a coded queer narrative regarding the tension between 'topping' and 'bottoming,' where the chair refuses to bottom for the top (the man) until it has an opportunity to top. Once this is realised, and assented to, the chair willingly returns to its expectations. The romantic body language shared between the chair and the man support this view.

== Accolades ==
Year	Award	Category	Recipient(s) and nominee(s)	Result
1957	Venice Film Festival	Non-Theatrical Arts and Experimental	Norman McLaren and Claude Jutra	Won
1957	Rapallo International Film Festival	Second Prize, Experimental	Norman McLaren and Claude Jutra	Won
1958	British Academy of Film and Television Arts (BAFTA)	Special Award: Work Lying Outside The Feature and Documentary Fields	A Chairy Tale	Won
1958	10th Canadian Film Awards	Award of Merit, Non-theatrical, Arts and Experimental	Norman McLaren, Claude Jutra	Won
1958	30th Academy Awards	Best Live Action Short Subject	Norman McLaren	Nominated

== Title ==
The title is a pun on the term "fairy tale" (using a portmanteau of "chair" and "fairy"), which is further emphasized by the use of the cliché fairy tale opening phrase "Once upon a time..." at the start of the film. It may also play on the word chary, a British adjective seldom encountered in American English. The Oxford English Dictionary (OED) defines the word as "cautiously or suspiciously reluctant to do something."
