= Hen Hop =

- Directed by: Norman McLaren
- Produced by: Norman McLaren
- Distributed by: National Film Board of Canada (NFB)
- Release date: 1942
- Running time: 4 minutes
- Country: Canada
- Language: none

Hen Hop is a 1942 drawn-on-film animation short created by Norman McLaren for the National Film Board of Canada. In it, a hen gradually breaks apart into an abstract movement of lines as it dances to a barn dance.

One of a number of drawn-on-film animated works created by McLaren, Hen Hop was animated by inking and scraping film stock, with colour added optically afterwards.

To make Hen Hop, McLaren spent days in a chicken coop to capture what he called "the spirit of henliness".

== Reception ==
Hen Hop received a Special Award at the 1949 World Film Festival in Brussels.

Upon viewing it, Pablo Picasso was reported to have exclaimed "at last something new".

Dutch animator Gerrit van Dijk, reproduces part of the film as well as quotes from McLaren about making Hen Hop his 1997 work, I Move, So I Am.
