= Evelyn Lambart =

Canadian animator and technical director (1914-1999

- Born: July 23, 1914; Ottawa, Ontario, Canada
- Died: April 3, 1999 (aged 84); Ottawa, Ontario, Canada
- Education: Ontario College of Art
- Occupations: Animator, director
- Years active: 1940-1980

Evelyn Lambart (July 23, 1914 – April 3, 1999) was a Canadian animator and film director with the National Film Board of Canada, known for her independent work, and for her collaborations with Norman McLaren.

== Early years ==
Born in Ottawa as a deaf individual, she later credited her mother for fostering her interest and future career in film. Due to her hearing impairment, her mother supplied her with ink and paper, fostering her relationship with animation. After attending Lisgar Collegiate Institute in Ottawa, Lambart studied at the Ontario College of Art for five years, graduating in 1937. Her plan had been to continue her art studies in the U.K., however, the outbreak of Second World War made that impossible. Instead, Lambart spent a year and a half working with Grace Melvin on illuminations and lettering for the first Books of Remembrance, commemorating Canadian war dead in the First World War (now on display at St. Paul's Cathedral).

== Career ==
Lambart started at the National Film Board of Canada in the titling department, as a letterer, tasked with creating title cards for animations, alongside any other text involved in the films. Her first start in making animations was for wartime propaganda films such as Main Dish (1943), Fortress Japan (1944), and several segments for the recurring weekly show The World in Action (1941-45).

In 1942, due to an ever-growing demand for animation, NFB commissioner John Grierson asked McLaren to form an animation unit and, in January 1943, 'Studio A' formally came into existence. Lambart was one of McLaren's first recruits and the first female animator hired by the board and is considered "First Lady of Canadian animation". McLaren was confident in the choice of Lambart as they had worked alongside one another in the titling department of the National Film Board of Canada.

One of the first productions that Lambart had taken full creative control of was a collaboration with her and McLaren called The Impossible Map (1947). It was an education film centered around explaining the concept of comparing 3D and 2D shapes. The film used maps and the globe as a way to explain the concept, as Lambart specialized in map animations. The film used a cutout grapefruit with the map of the world painted on it to visualize the distortion of illustrating a 3D map in 2D.

During her time at the National Film Board of Canada, Lambart also trained other animators; both Colin Low and Robert Verrall credited her with teaching them their animation skills. She collaborated with Low on The Challenge (1950), an educational film centered around educating the audience on the effects and mystery surrounding cancer and how leading medical professionals aim to treat and prevent the disease. Lambart and Lows contribution to the film included extensive animated sequences of how the various cells in the body are affected by the cancer cells.

=== Begone Dull Care (1949) ===
During her career at the National Film Board of Canada, Lambart was a part of many films, perhaps her most celebrated contribution being 1949's Begone Dull Care, a film she edited, co-directed, and co-animated with her National Film Board of Canada colleague, Norman McLaren. While many attribute the notoriety of the film to the more popular McLaren, Lambarts contributions remain relevant to the success of the film. The experimental film was shot using sheets of celluloid that were marked and scratched by McLaren. The marked sheets of celluloid were paired alongside a score from Canadian jazz musician Oscar Peterson. McLaren and Lambarts visuals served as a visual representation of the music, which aimed to match the experimental visual style with the highs and the lows of the jazz performance.

Begone Dull Care serves as one of the most celebrated Canadian films, winning six international film prizes within the first five years of its release.

=== Paper cut-out technique ===
During the later years of her career in the National Film Board of Canada, Lambart shifted her focus to a different style of animation featuring paper cutouts which she storyboarded and manually manipulated herself. This new amination technique resulted in her often times being the sole contributor to many of her later projects, a change in pace that she described as a "rough adjustment" as she became the sole creative lead for many of her projects.

She used this technique in seven award-winning films: Fine Feathers (1968), The Hoarder (1969), Paradise Lost (1970), The Story of Christmas (1973), Mr. Frog Went A-Courting (1974), The Lion and the Mouse/Le Lion et la Souris (1976) and The Town Mouse and the Country Mouse/Le Rat de maison et le Rat des champs (1980).

== Honours ==
Lambart was awarded a posthumous Winsor McCay Award in 2022.

== Filmography ==
- The Main Dish - documentary short, 1943, co-animator
- Fortress Japan - documentary short, 1944, co-animator
- The World in Action - documentary short, 1941-45, co-animator
- Story of a Violin - documentary short, Jacques Bobet 1947 - co-animator with Norman McLaren
- The Impossible Map - documentary short, 1947 - animator, director
- Begone Dull Care - experimental short, 1949 - editor, co-animator and co-director with Norman McLaren
- Family Tree - animated short, 1950 - co-director and co-animator with George Dunning
- Challenge: Science Against Cancer - documentary short, Morten Parker 1950 - co-animator with Colin Low
- The Fight: Science Against Cancer - documentary short, Morten Parker 1950 - co-animator with Colin Low
- The Outlaw Within - documentary short, Morten Parker 1951 - co-animator with Colin Low
- Now is the Time - experimental, Norman McLaren 1951 - co-producer
- Around Is Around - experimental short, Norman McLaren 1951 - co-animator with Norman McLaren
- Sing a Little - animated short, Tom Daly 1951 - co-animator with Jean-Paul Ladouceur
- O Canada - experimental short, 1952 - animator, director
- The Maple Leaf - documentary short, J.V. Durden 1955 - co-animator with Robert Verrall
- The Colour of Life - documentary short, J.V. Durden 1955 - co-animator with Robert Verrall
- Rythmetic - animated short, 1956 - photography, co-director and co-animator with Norman McLaren
- Putting It Straight - documentary short, William Greaves 1957 - co-animator with Sidney Goldsmith
- A Chairy Tale - experimental short, Norman McLaren and Claude Jutra 1957 - animator
- Le Merle - animated short, Norman McLaren 1958 - co-animator with Norman McLaren
- Short and Suite - experimental short, 1959 - co-animator with Norman McLaren
- Lines: Vertical - experimental short, 1960 - co-animator and co-director with Norman McLaren]
- Les femmes parmi nous - La dignité - documentary short, Jacques Bobet 1961 - co-animator with Arthur Lipsett
- Les femmes parmi nous - Le bonheur - documentary short, Jacques Bobet 1961 - co-animator with Arthur Lipsett
- Lines: Horizontal - experimental short, 1962 - co-animator and co-director with Norman McLaren
- Mosaic - experimental short, 1965 - co-animator and co-director with Norman McLaren
- The Hoarder - animated short, 1969 - animator, director
- The Embryonic Development of Fish - documentary short, J.V. Durden 1961 - animator
- Fine Feathers - animated short, 1968 - animator, director
- Paradise Lost - animated short, 1970 - animator, director
- The Story of Christmas - animated short, 1974 - animator, director
- Mr. Frog Went A-Courting - animated short, 1974 - animator, director
- The Lion and the Mouse - animated short, 1976 - animator, director
- The Town Mouse and the Country Mouse - animated short, 1980 - animator, director

== Awards ==
Begone Dull Care (1949)

- Venice Film Festival, Venice: First Prize, Art Films, 1950
- 2nd Canadian Film Awards, Ottawa: Special Award, Experimentation, 1950
- Salerno Film Festival, Salerno, Italy: Honourable Mention, Miscellaneous Film, 1950
- Berlin International Film Festival, Berlin: Silver Medal, Documentary Short Film, 1951
- American Federation of Arts and Film Advisory Center Film Festival, Woodstock, New York: Best Experimental Film, 1952
- Durban International Film Festival, Durban: First Place, Silver Medal, Experimental, 1954

Family Tree (1950)

- Salerno Film Festival, Salerno: First Prize – Grand Award, Best of All Entries, 1951
- 3rd Canadian Film Awards, Ottawa: Special Award for Outstanding Animation and Musical Score, 1951
- Rapallo International Film Festival, Rapallo: Second Prize, Art Films, 1957

Now is the Time (1951)

- 4th Canadian Film Awards, Special Award for Experimental Filmmaking, 1952 (with Around Is Around)

Around Is Around (1951)

- BFI London Film Festival, London: Nominee: Best Animation, 1957
- 4th Canadian Film Awards, Special Award for Experimental Filmmaking, 1952 (with Now is the Time)

Rythmetic (1956)

- 6th Berlin International Film Festival, Berlin: Silver Bear, Short Films, 1956
- Edinburgh International Film Festival, Edinburgh: Diploma of Merit, 1956
- Rapallo International Film Festival, Rapallo, Italy: First Prize, Abstract Films, 1957
- International Review of Specialized Cinematography, Rome: Diploma of Honour, 1957
- Chicago Festival of Contemporary Arts, University of Illinois Chicago: First Prize 1957
- Golden Reel International Film Festival, Film Council of America, New York: Silver Reel Award, Avant-Garde and Experimental, 1957
- Durban International Film Festival, Durban: Certificate of Merit, 1957
- Johannesburg International Film Festival, Johannesburg: Certificate of Merit, 1957

Lines: Vertical (1960)

- Venice Film Festival, Venice: First Prize, Experimental, 1960
- BFI London Film Festival, London: Outstanding Film of the Year for Presentation, 1960
- Edinburgh International Film Festival, Edinburgh: Diploma of Merit, 1960
- CIDALC Festival of Music and Dance in Film, Valencia: First Prize, 1961
- 13th Canadian Film Awards, Toronto: Best Film, Arts and Experimental, 1961

Mosaic (1965)

- Vancouver International Film Festival, Vancouver: Certificate of Merit, 1965
- FIBA International Festival of Buenos Aires, Buenos Aires: First Prize, 1966
- Melbourne Film Festival, Melbourne: First Prize, 1966
- American Film and Video Festival, New York: Blue Ribbon, 1966
- Calvin Workshop Awards, Kansas City, Missouri: Notable Film Award, 1966

The Hoarder (1969)

- International Festival of Films for Children and Young Adults, Tehran: Plaque and Diploma, 1970
- FIBA International Festival of Buenos Aires, Buenos Aires: Honorable Mention, Animation, 1970
- Tisquesusa Dorado International Festival of Short Films, Bogotá: Best Animated Film, 1971
- American Film and Video Festival, New York: Blue Ribbon, 1971

Paradise Lost (1970)

- National Educational Media Network Competition, Oakland, California: Don Fabun Award for Film as Art, 1972
