= List of glitch artists =

The following is a list of glitch artists working in various media. Glitch artists make art based on errors and faults.

== A ==
- American Artist
- Mark Amerika
- Kalliope Amorphous

== B ==
- Michael Betancourt
- Michael Borras AKA Systaime
- Nia Burks

== F ==
- Jamie Fenton

== J ==
- Jodi (art collective)

== L ==
- Eric Leiser

== M ==
- Rosa Menkman
- monochrom
- Takeshi Murata

== N ==
- Filippo Nesci

== P ==
- Sondra Perry

== R ==
- Casey Reas
- Tabita Rezaire

== S ==
- Rob Sheridan

== T ==
- Canan Tolon

== X ==
- Xcopy
