= Postdigital =

Artistic movement

Postdigital, in artistic practice, is a term that describes works of art and theory that are more concerned with being human than with being digital, similar to the concept of "undigital" introduced in 1995, where technology and society advances beyond digital limitations to achieve a totally fluid multimediated reality that is free from artefacts of digital computation (quantization noise, pixelation, etc.). The postdigital is concerned with our rapidly changed and changing relationships with digital technologies and art forms.

== Theory ==
According to Giorgio Agamben (2002), the postdigital is a paradigm that (as with post-humanism) does not aim to describe a life after digital, but rather, attempts to describe the present-day opportunity to explore the consequences of the digital and of the computer age. While the computer age has enhanced human capacity with inviting and uncanny prosthetics, the postdigital provides a paradigm with which it is possible to examine and understand this enhancement.

In The Future of Art in a Postdigital Age, Mel Alexenberg defines "postdigital art" as artworks that address the humanization of digital technologies through interplay between digital, biological, cultural, and spiritual systems, between cyberspace and real space, between embodied media and mixed reality in social and physical communication, between high tech and high touch experiences, between visual, haptic, auditory, and kinesthetic media experiences, between virtual and augmented reality, between roots and globalization, between autoethnography and community narrative, and between web-enabled peer-produced wikiart and artworks created with alternative media through participation, interaction, and collaboration in which the role of the artist is redefined, and between tactile art and NFTs. Mel Alexenberg proposes that a postdigital age is defined in Wired by MIT Media Center director Nicholas Negroponte: "Like air and drinking water, being digital will be noticed only in its absence, not by its presence. Face it - the Digital Revolution is over"

== Music ==
Kim Cascone uses the term in his article The Aesthetics of Failure: "Post-digital" Tendencies in Contemporary Computer Music. He begins the article with a quotation from MIT Media Lab cyberpundit Nicholas Negroponte: "The digital revolution is over." Cascone goes on to describe what he sees as a 'post-digital' line of flight in the music also commonly known as glitch or microsound music, observing that 'with electronic commerce now a natural part of the business fabric of the Western world and Hollywood cranking out digital fluff by the gigabyte, the medium of digital technology holds less fascination for composers in and of itself.' Japanese theorist, Ryota Matsumoto adapts the postdigital discourse of Kim Cascone to their ingenious culture and construes Japanese social structure as the postdigital after the collapse of capitalist accumulation and the subsequent integration of their tradition with the pharmacology of digital age.

In Art after Technology, Maurice Benayoun lists possible tracks for "postdigital" art considering that the digital flooding has altered the entire social, economical, artistic landscape, and the artist posture will move in ways that try to escape the technological realm without being able to completely discard it. From lowtech to biotech and critical fusion - critical intrusion of fiction inside reality – new forms of art emerge from the digital era.

== See also ==
- Circuit bending
- Databending
- Digital Art
- Glitch
- New Aesthetic
- New media art
