= XCopy =

XCopy may refer to:

- XCOPY, an advanced file copying program for DOS and Windows
- X-Copy, a floppy disk copying program for the Commodore Amiga
- XCOPY (artist), a digital artist based in London

== See also ==
- COPY, the simpler built-in copying command for DOS and Windows
