= 2nd Round =

2nd Round may refer to:

- 2nd Round, a 2004 album by Sporto Kantes, 2004
- 2nd Round, a 2000 album by 1TYM
- "2nd Round", a 2012 song by Usher from Looking 4 Myself
- "2nd Round", a 2021 song by Jim-E Stack
- Gatta Kusthi 2nd Round, a 2026 Indian film by Chella Ayyavu, sequel to Gatta Kusthi (2022)

== See also ==
- The Second Round (disambiguation)
