= Kraakdoos =

Touch-sensitive musical instrument played with the fingers

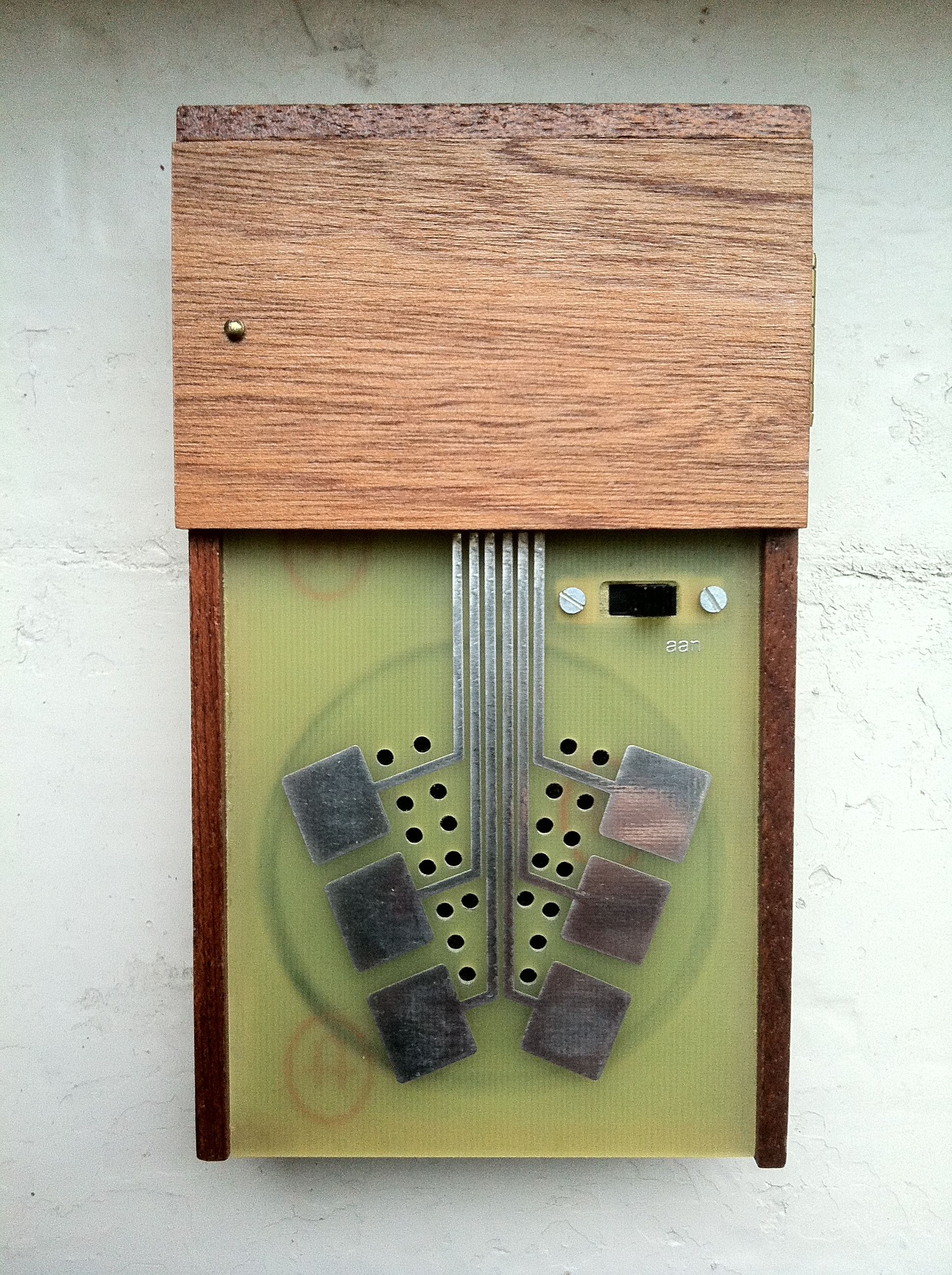
A kraakdoos

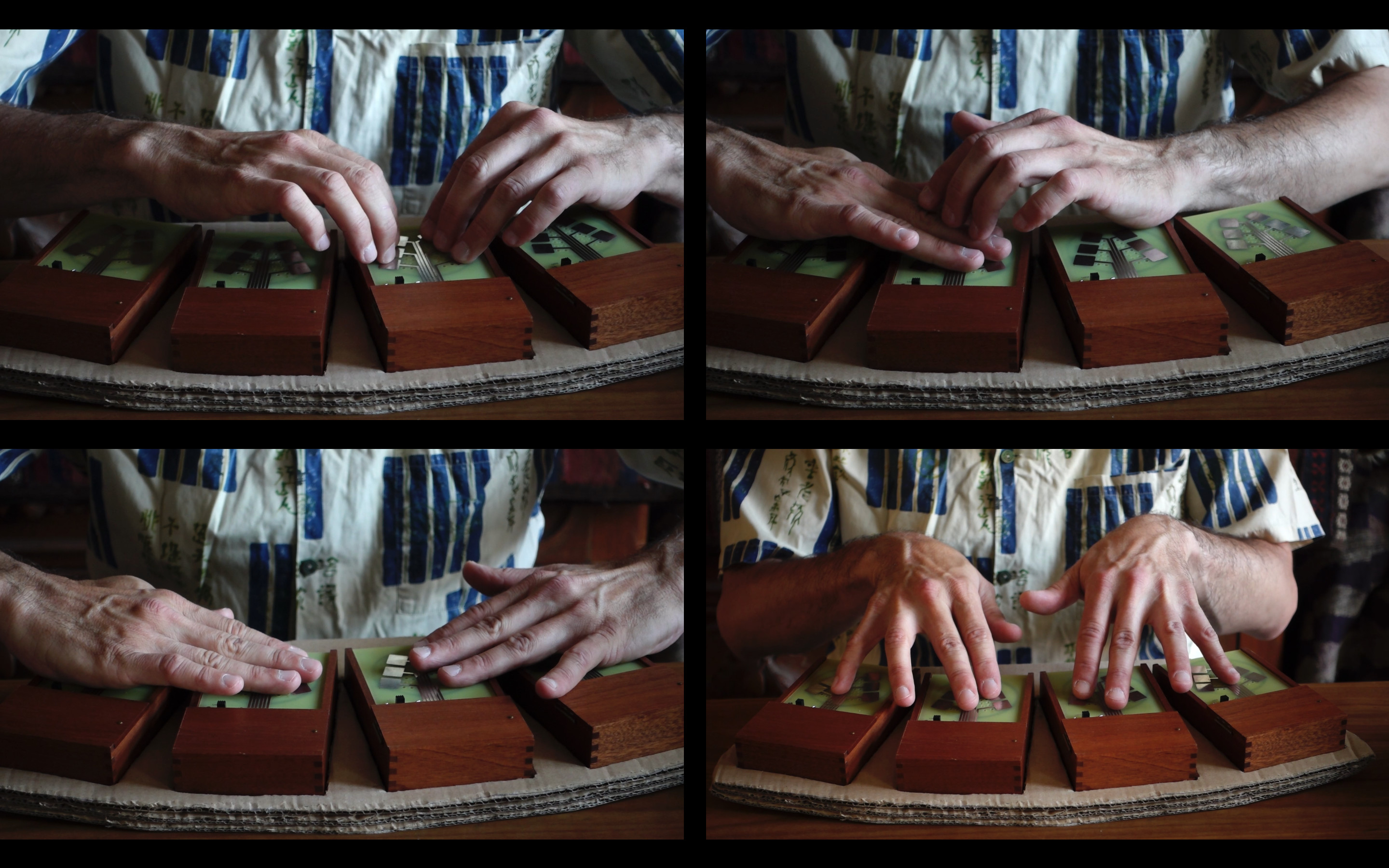
Four Crackleboxes being played simultaneously

A kraakdoos or cracklebox is a custom-made instrument, in the form of a noise-making electronic device. It is a small box with six metal contacts on top, which generate various unusual sounds and tones when pressed by the performer's fingers. The human body becomes a part of the circuit and determines the range of sounds possible, thus different people–or the same person at different times–shall generate different results.

While there are certain configurations of one's digits that result in more or less recallable results the preferred way of playing it is led by listening to how the instrument responds to manipulation and then maintaining and modifying one's contact points. The player thus enters into a tactile and sonic dialogue with the instrument.

The concept was first conceived by Michel Waisvisz and Geert Hamelberg in the 1960s, and developed further in the 1970s when Waisvisz joined the STEIM foundation in Amsterdam, Netherlands. The kraakdoos is a simple device, based on a single operational amplifier (the LM709 one of the earliest models to be produced) and a few transistors, and can be constructed with only a basic understanding of electronics.

The LM709 lacks frequency compensation. This means the op-amp is, likely, operating as a phase-shift oscillator driving transistors in a dead band resulting in a highly distorted output.

The musician Andrew Levine plays the Cracklebox regularly as part of his setup, in which it is the only instrument not dependent on external amplification, and has also experimented with a four-Crackle box-configuration.

== See also ==
- Atari Punk Console
- Circuit bending
