= Systaime =

French video designer and graphic artist

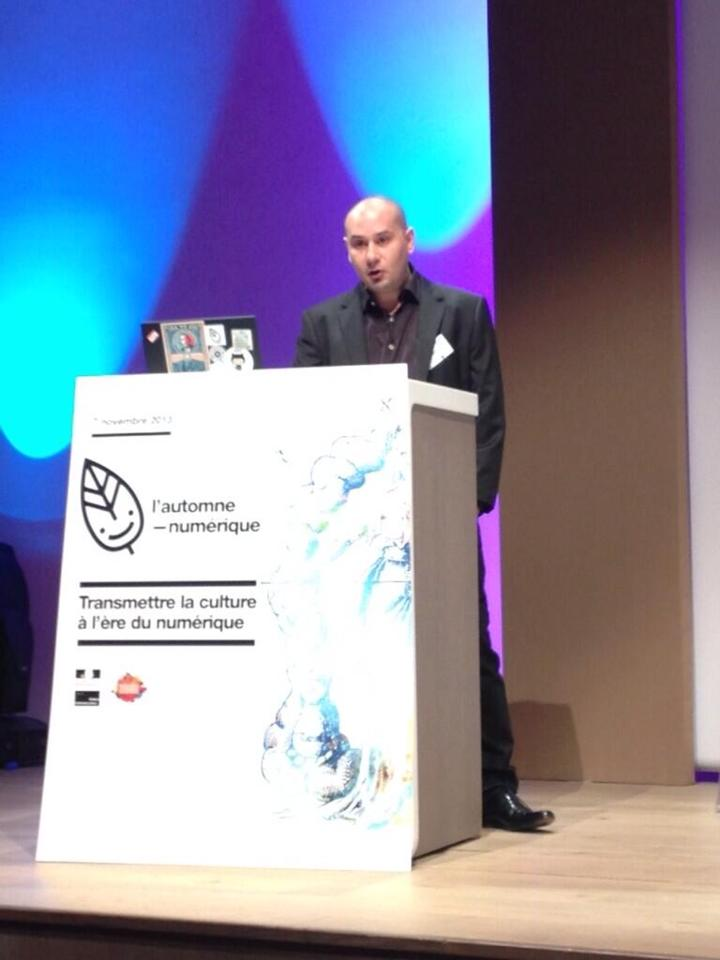
- Conférence Ministere de la culture, Automne numérique, "Les net-artistes en réseau et les nouvelles initiatives d’exposition en ligne"
- Born: Michaël Borras; 29 January 1973 (age 53)
- Notable work: SPAMM, Video
- Movement: French Trash Touch, Postinternet art, Net.art

Systaime (born 29 January 1973) is a French contemporary visual artist. His given name is Michael Borras.

== Biography ==
His name of artist Systaime, chosen in the late 1990s when he was a figurative painter, is the contraction of the words "Système" and "Aime". They symbolize for the artist the love and understanding that is necessary for a data processing or political system in order to circumvent, divert or subvert it.

Former art school student, he is a multidisciplinary French artist and exhibition curator, net.art activist and video jockey. He experimented with painting, GIFs, remixes, Mash Up, blogs, books, CDs, photos, audio/video performances, music videos, TV reviews. He is more particularly known as multimedia and networks artist. Systaime defines his style as "French Trash Touch", a name of his invention derived from the musical movement French Touch. it distributes its creations since 1999 but hopes to "get out the Web to Web" and is for example that circulate VHS in 2003 to go to meet those who do not have internet access. Michaël Borras considers that the debates between the "great culture" and the "subculture" do not have to be, that there is no "difference between a painter who will spend hours on a canvas and an artist who will spend hours also on the creation of a GIF".

== Work ==
His videos often consist of collages of images and sounds from all backgrounds : excerpts of policy interventions, home videos, animated gifs, etc. In 2003, Annick Rivoire judge his work class "above average achievements on the Internet". It also carries out machinima, films directed by filming inside a virtual world or a video game.

Systaime created in 2011 website SuPer Modern Art Museum, a sort of virtual museum that brings together some fifty works of net.art. In March 2013, the SPAMM presents "Cupcake", projected video installation in the windows of the PROJECT-ion gallery in New York. In July, Systaime organizes with Miyo Van Stenis and Helena Acosta exposure SPAMM Dulce at Contemporary Art Museum of Caracas in Venezuela. Two years later, in July 2015, he organized with Helena accosted and Jean Guillaume Le Roux exhibition over three days entitled "spamm of Virtualism" and submitted at the Babycastles Gallery in New York, the EKLUZ gallery in Paris and the 'Electromuseum in Moscow where the trio explores and questions the evolution of digital media such as creating materials.

Since 2012, Systaime is contributor to the emission of "L'oeil de Links" broadcast on the channel Canal +.

Systaime participated in the creation of music videos. He has collaborated with various artists as Charlélie Couture, Sporto Kantes, Odezenne, Orties or even Asia Argento for the music video of her title Sexodrome in 2013.
