= The Adventures of Robby Roto! =

1981 video game

Robby Roto
- Developer: Bally/Midway
- Publisher: Bally/Midway
- Designers: Jamie Fenton; Dave Nutting
- Platform: Arcade
- Release: 1981
- Genre: Maze
- Modes: Single-player, multiplayer
- Arcade system: Astrocade-based

The Adventures of Robby Roto! (usually shortened to Robby Roto) is an arcade video game produced by Bally/Midway in 1981. In Robby Roto, the player digs through a dirt-filled maze collecting items while avoiding pursuing creatures. It is one of the few games made available to legally download on the official website of video game emulator MAME.

== Gameplay ==
Robby is at the top center. Two enemies are in dirt-filled tunnels with only their eyes visible.

The player controls the titular character who enters an underground maze to rescue trapped miners and collect treasures. The mine is initially filled with dirt, which Robby digs away as he moves through it, clearing a path behind him. The entire mine is shown without dirt briefly as each new level starts. As he digs, Robby will sometimes bump into rocky areas which he cannot dig out, in which case small arrows appear indicating the directions he can move.

Scattered in the mine are three trapped miners, represented by frowny faces in a red box. When Robby digs them out, they turn into smileys and begin to follow him as he moves. The goal of each level is to return the trapped miners to the surface, and only one path, at the top center or the map, leads outward. At higher levels, a door closes behind Robby after he enters, and must be opened by retrieving a key before the level can be completed.

Also found in the mine are a number of enemies, initially spiders, who chase Robby and can kill him. The game starts with three lives. They will also re-trap the miners if they touch them, dragging the miners away from Robby. Robby can temporarily render the enemies impotent with the Robo Device, which can be collected in the maze, and use this to recapture the miners.

== Reception ==
Robby Roto sold fewer than 2,000 units and was much less popular than 1982's Dig Dug. Co-developer Dave Nutting claimed, "it was a very complex game and those who played it found themselves on the defensive—most were intimidated. Gamers like to be aggressive."
