= Databending =

Distortion of digital media

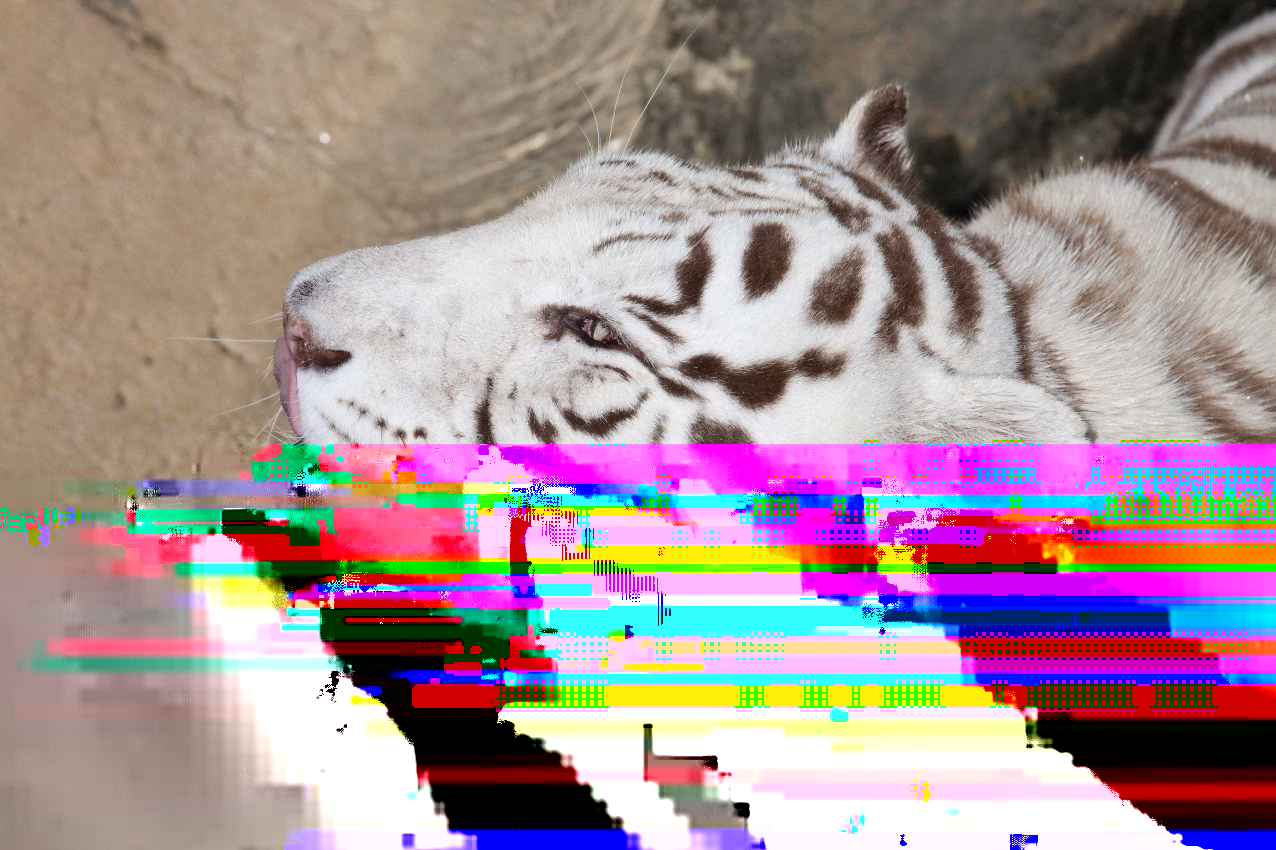
A databent image of a white tiger, introducing unpredictable visual artifacts in the lower half of the frame

Databending (or data bending) is the process of manipulating a media file of a certain format, using software designed to edit files of another format, such as the use of audio editing software to edit an image file, for example. Distortions in the medium occur as a result, and the process is frequently employed in glitch art.

== Process and techniques ==
The term databending is derived from circuit bending, in which objects such as children's toys, effects pedals, and electronic keyboards are deliberately short circuited by bending the circuit board to produce erratic and spontaneous sounds. Like circuit bending, databending involves the (often unpredictable) alteration of its target's behavior. Databending achieves this alteration by manipulating the information within a media file of a certain format, using software designed to edit files of a different format, with the intention of creating distortions in the medium as a result.

Many techniques exist, ranging from relatively simple to more technically complex, such as the use of hex editors to manipulate certain components of a compression algorithm. Michael Betancourt has posed a short set of instructions, included in the Signal Culture Cookbook, involving the direct manipulation of the digital file using a hexadecimal editing program. For instance, one might employ the addition of audio effects through audio editing software to distort raw data interpretations of image files. Some effects produce optical analogues: adding an echo filter duplicates elements of a photo, and inversion might result in the mirroring of an image. The similarities result from waveforms corresponding with layers of pixels in a linear fashion, ordered from top to bottom. Another method, the "WordPad effect", uses the program WordPad to manipulate images by converting the raw data to the Rich Text Format.

=== Categorization ===
According to the artist Benjamin Berg, different techniques of the process can be grouped into three categories:

- Incorrect editing: Files of a certain format are manipulated using software designed to edit files of a different format.
- Reinterpretation: Files are simply converted from one medium to another.
- Forced errors: Known software bugs are exploited to force the program to terminate, usually while writing a file.

Reinterpretation contains a subcategory called "sonification", in which data other than audio is introduced simultaneously with musical audio data.

== Usage and reception ==
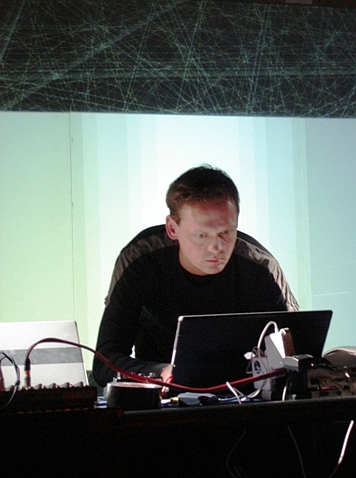
Alva Noto uses sonification in his music.

Databending is frequently employed in glitch art, and is considered a sub-category of the genre. The sonification technique is commonly used by glitch musicians such as Alva Noto. Ahuja and Lu summarized the process through a quote by Adam Clark Estes of Gizmodo as "the internet's code-heavy version of graffiti." Various groups on Flickr explore the effects of databending on imagery; an Internet bot named "GlitchBot" was created to scrape Creative Commons-licensed imagery and apply the process and upload the results. Users on Vimeo who deal explicitly with databending and glitch art in general exist, and a Chicago-based digital art project named GLI.TC/H was funded using Kickstarter in 2011.

== See also ==
- Compression artifact
