= The Second Round =

Second Round or The Second Round may refer to:

- The second round of voting which takes place in a two-round voting system.
- Second Round (album), a 2011 album by music band Mayday
- The Second Round (novel), a 2024 novel by Lenrie Peters
- Second Round, a 2018 novel by Patricia Bray

== See also ==
- 2nd Round (disambiguation)
- "Second Round K.O., a 1998 song by Canibus
- Second Round's on Me, a 2006 album by Obie Trice
- "Second Round: Tenth Fight", an episode of The Tactical Combat Simulator featuring Marina Mazepa
