= Glitch art =

Practice of using technological errors in art

Kodak Moment (2013), a glitched video by animator Michael Betancourt

Glitch art is an art movement that uses digital or analog errors, known as glitches, for aesthetic purposes, often by corrupting digital data or physically manipulating electronic devices. It is also associated with new media art and has been retrospectively traced to artistic practices dating back to the 20th century.

== History of the term ==
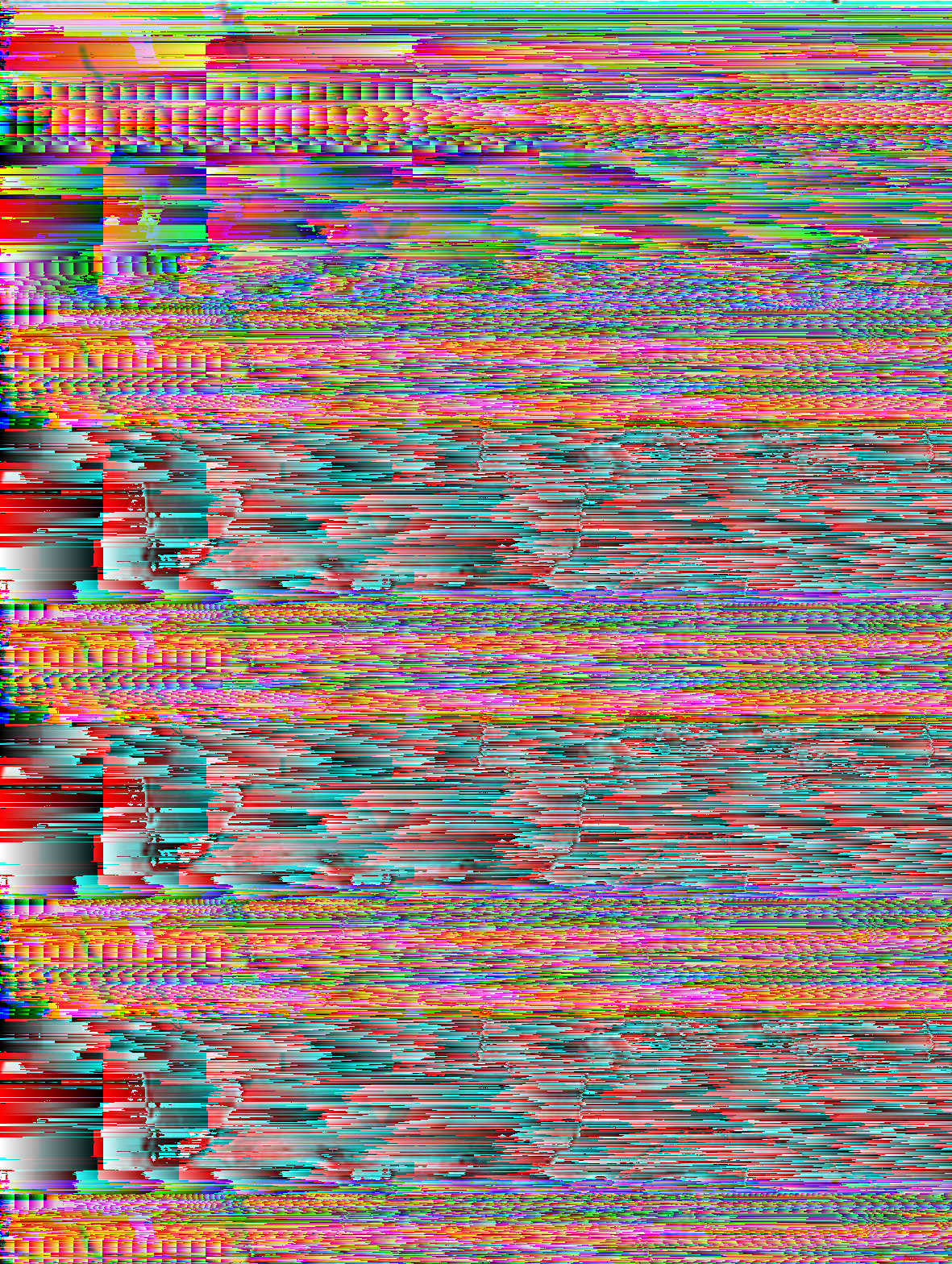
Example of glitch art, by Rosa Menkman

As a technical word, a glitch is the unexpected result of a malfunction, especially occurring in software, video games, images, videos, audio, and other digital artefacts. The term came to be associated with music in the mid-1990s to describe a genre of experimental electronic music, glitch music. Shortly after, as VJs and other visual artists began to embrace glitch as an aesthetic of the digital age, glitch art came to refer to a whole assembly of visual arts. One such early movement was later dubbed net.art, including early work by the art collective JODI, which was started by artists Joan Heemskerk and Dirk Paesmans. JODI's experiments on glitch art included purposely causing layout errors in their website in order to display underlying code and error messages. The explorations of JODI and other net.art members would later influence visual distortion practices like databending and datamoshing. The history of glitch art has been regarded as ranging from crafted artworks such as the film A Colour Box (1935) by Len Lye and the video sculpture TV Magnet (1965) by Nam June Paik, as well as Digital TV Dinner (1978) created by Jamie Fenton and Raul Zaritsky, with audio by Dick Ainsworth—made by manipulating the Bally video game console and recording the results on videotape—to more process-based contemporary work such as Panasonic TH-42PWD8UK Plasma Screen Burn (2007) by Cory Arcangel.

== Glitch art events ==
In 2002, Motherboard, a tech-art collective, held the first glitch art symposium in Oslo, Norway during January, to "bring together international artists, academics and other Glitch practitioners for a short space of time to share their work and ideas with the public and with each other." From September 29 to October 3, 2010, Chicago played host to the first GLI.TC/H, a five-day conference in Chicago organized by Nick Briz, Evan Meaney, Rosa Menkman and Jon Satrom that included workshops, lectures, performances, installations and screenings. In November 2011, the second GLI.TC/H event traveled from Chicago to Amsterdam and lastly to Birmingham, UK. It included workshops, screenings, lectures, performance, panel discussions and a gallery show over the course of seven days at the three cities. In 2013, the Run Computer, Run at GLITCH 2013 arts festival at RuaRed, South Dublin Arts Centre - Dublin, was curated by Nora O Murchú.

=== 2015 ===
- /'fu:bar/ 2015
- "Glitch Art is Dead" at Teatr Barakah in Krakow, Poland. Curated by Ras Alhague and Aleksandra Pienkosz.
- reFrag: glitch at La Gaïté Lyrique in Paris, France. Organized by the School Art Institute of Chicago and Parsons Paris.

=== 2016 ===
- /'fu:bar/ 2016

=== 2017 ===
- /'fu:bar/ 2017
- "Glitch Art is Dead 2" at Gamut Gallery, in Minneapolis, Minnesota, US. Curated by Miles Taylor, Ras Alhague and Aleksandra Pienkosz.

=== 2018 ===
- /'fu:bar/ 2018
- Blue\x80 & Nuit Blanche at Villette Makerz in Paris, France. Curated by Ras Alhague and Kaspar Ravel.
- Refrag #4 Cradle-to-Grave at Espace en cours in Paris, France. Curated by Benjamin Gaulon.

=== 2019 ===
- /'fu:bar/ 2019
- Communication Noise exhibition, Media Mediterranea 21 festival, Pula, Croatia.

=== 2020 ===
- /'fu:bar/ 2020
- An Exercise of Meaning in a Glitch Season an exhibition in National Gallery Singapore. Curated By: Syaheedah Iskandar.
- Posthumanism, Epidigital, and Glitch Feminism an exhibition at Machida City Museum of Graphic Arts in Japan. Curated By: Ryota Matsumoto.

=== 2021 ===
- /'fu:bar/ 2021
- Glitch Art: Pixel Language, the first glitch art exhibition in Iran.
- Glitch Art in Iran. La prima mostra artistica collettiva.

=== 2022 ===
- Glitch Art in Iran. La prima mostra artistica collettiva.
- Glitch: Aesthetic of the Pixels, the second glitch video art group exhibit in Iran.
- Glitch Art is Dead: The 3rd Expo, September 2–4 in Granite Falls, MN

=== 2023 ===
- GLITCH The Art of Interference, Pinakothek der Moderne, Munich, Germany

== Methods ==
What is called "glitch art" typically means visual glitches, either in a still or moving image. It is made by either "capturing" an image of a glitch as it randomly happens, or more often by artists/designers manipulating their digital files, software or hardware to produce these "errors." Artists have posted a variety of tutorials online explaining how to make glitch art. There are many approaches to making these glitches happen on demand, ranging from physical changes to the hardware to direct alterations of the digital files themselves. Artist Michael Betancourt identified five areas of manipulation that are used to create "glitchart." Betancourt notes that "glitch art" is defined by a broad range of technical approaches that can be identified with changes made to the digital file, its generative display, or the technologies used to show it (such as a video screen). He includes within this range changes made to analog technologies such as television (in video art) or the physical film strip in motion pictures.

=== Data manipulation ===
An example of datamoshing

Data manipulation (or databending) changes the information inside the digital file to create glitches. Databending involves editing and changing the file data. There are a variety of tutorials explaining how to make these changes using programs such as HexFiend. Adam Woodall explains in his tutorial:

Like all files, image files (.jpg .bmp .gif etc) are all made up of text. Unlike some other files, like .svg (vectors) or .html (web pages), when an image is opened in a text editor all that comes up is gobbldygook!

Related processes such as datamoshing changes the data in a video or picture file. Datamoshing with software such as Avidemux is a common method for creating glitch art by manipulating different frame types in compressed digital video:

Datamoshing involves the removal of an encoded video’s I-frames (intra-coded picture, also known as key frames—a frame that does not require any information regarding another frame to be decoded), leaving only the P- (predicted picture) or B- (bi-predictive picture) frames. P-frames contain information predicting the changes in the image between the current frame and the previous one, and B-frames contain information predicting the image differences between the previous, current and subsequent frames. Because P- and B-frames use data from previous and forward frames, they are more compressed than I-Frames.

This process of direct manipulation of the digital data is not restricted to files that only appear on digital screens. "3D model glitching" refers to the purposeful corruption of the code in 3D animation programs resulting in distorted and abstract images of 3D virtual worlds, models and even 3D printed objects.

=== Misalignment ===
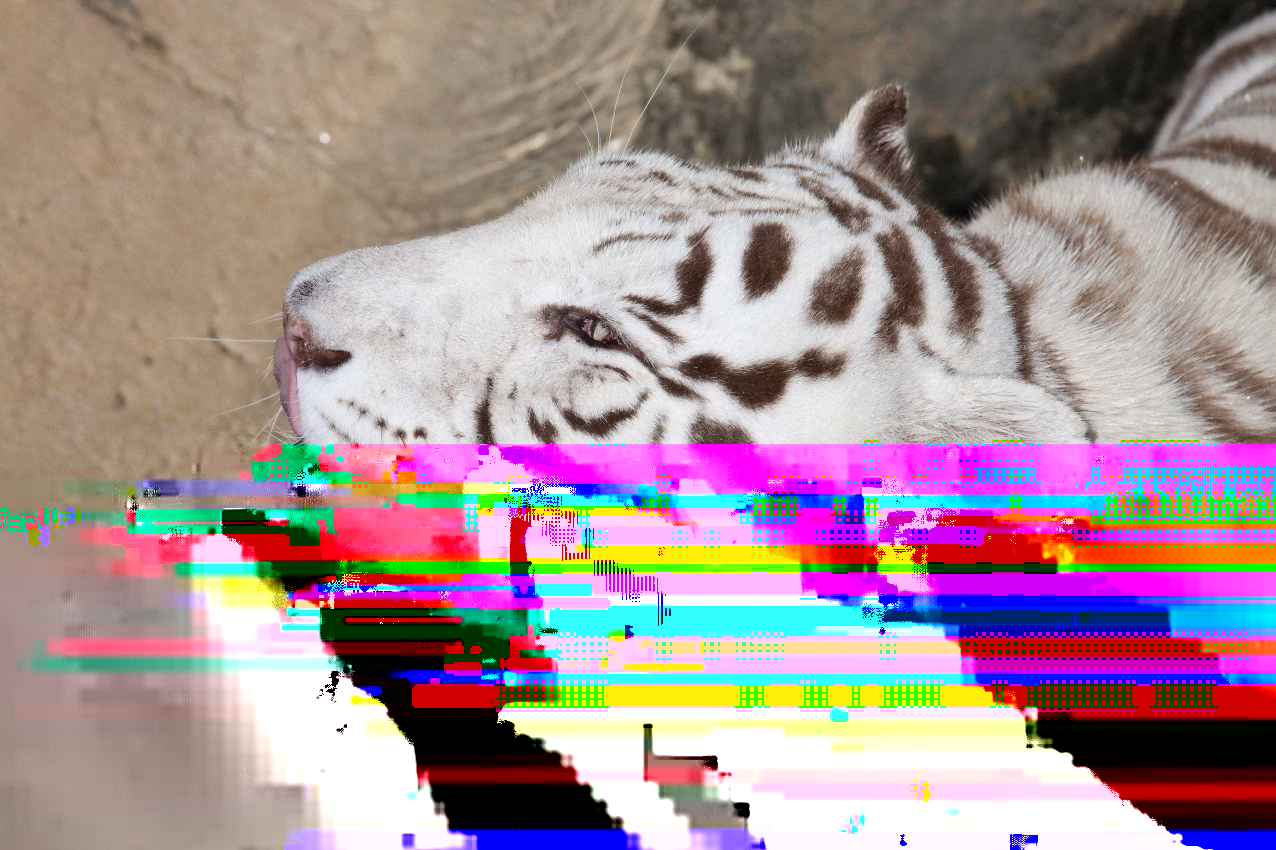
A misaligned image of a tiger

Misalignment glitches are produced by opening a digital file of one type with a program designed for a different type of file, such as opening a video file as a sound file, or using the wrong codec to decompress a file. Tools commonly used to create glitches of this type include Audacity and WordPad. These glitches can depend on how Audacity handles files, even when they are not audio-encoded.

Misalignment glitches can also be made with physical materials. Techniques include physically cutting an element out of a drawing or already made piece, then shifting it over and re-taping it to make an offset.

=== Hardware failure ===
Hardware failure happens by altering the physical wiring or other internal connections of the machine itself, such as a short circuit, in a process called "circuit bending", that causes the machine to create glitches that produce new sounds and visuals. For example, by damaging internal pieces of something like a VHS player, one can achieve different colorful visual images. Video artist Tom DeFanti explained the role of hardware failure in a voice-over for Jamie Fenton's early glitch video Digital TV Dinner that used the Bally video game console system:

This piece represents the absolute cheapest one can go in home computer art. This involves taking a $300 video game system, pounding it with your fist so the cartridge pops out while its trying to write the menu. The music here is done by Dick Ainsworth using the same system, but pounding it with your fingers instead of your fist.

Physically beating the case of the game system would cause the game cartridge to pop out, interrupting the computer's operation. The glitches that resulted from this failure were a result of how the machine was set up:

There was ROM memory in the cartridge and ROM memory built into the console. Popping out the cartridge while executing code in the console ROM created garbage references in the stack frames and invalid pointers, which caused the strange patterns to be drawn. ... The Bally Astrocade was unique among cartridge games in that it was designed to allow users to change game cartridges with power-on. When pressing the reset button, it was possible to remove the cartridge from the system and induce various memory dump pattern sequences. Digital TV Dinner is a collection of these curious states of silicon epilepsy set to music composed and generated upon this same platform.

=== Misregistration ===
Misregistration is produced by the physical noise of historically analog media such as motion picture film. It includes dirt, scratches, smudges and markings that can distort physical media also impact the playback of digital recordings on media such as CDs and DVDs, as electronic music composer Kim Cascone explained in 2002:

"There are many types of digital audio ‘failure.' Sometimes, it results in horrible noise, while other times it can produce wondrous tapestries of sound. (To more adventurous ears, these are quite often the same.) When the German sound experimenters known as Oval started creating music in the early 1990s by painting small images on the underside of CDs to make them skip, they were using an aspect of ‘failure' in their work that revealed a subtextual layer embedded in the compact disc.

Oval's investigation of ‘failure' is not new. Much work had previously been done in this area such as the optical soundtrack work of Laszlo Moholy-Nagy and Oskar Fischinger, as well as the vinyl record manipulations of John Cage and Christian Marclay, to name a few. What is new is that ideas now travel at the speed of light and can spawn entire musical genres in a relatively short period of time."

=== Distortion ===
Distortion was one of the earliest types of glitch art to be produced, such as in the work of video artist Nam June Paik, who created video distortions by placing powerful magnets in close proximity to the television screen, resulting in the appearance of abstract patterns. Paik's addition of physical interference to a TV set created new kinds of imagery that changed how the broadcast image was displayed:

The magnetic field interferes with the television’s electronic signals, distorting the broadcast image into an abstract form that changes when the magnet is moved.

By recording the resulting analog distortions with a camera, they can then be shown without the need for the magnet.

Compression artifacts is a noticeable distortion of media (including images, audio, and video) caused by the application of lossy compression. They can be intentionally used as a visual style in glitch art. Rosa Menkman's work makes use of compression artifacts, particularly the discrete cosine transform blocks (DCT blocks) found in most digital media data compression formats such as JPEG digital images and MP3 digital audio. Another example is Jpegs by German photographer Thomas Ruff, which uses intentional JPEG artifacts as the basis of the picture's style.

== See also ==
- Electronic art – Art that uses or refers to electronic media
- Internet art – Form of art distributed on the Internet
- List of glitch artists
- Postdigital – Artistic movement
- Wabi-sabi – Japanese aesthetic about imperfection
- Zalgo text – Digital text excessively modified to look frightening
- Glitchcore – Music genre
