= Takeshi Murata =

American contemporary artist (born 1974)

- Born: 1974 (age 51–52); Chicago, Illinois, U.S.
- Education: Rhode Island School of Design
- Known for: Digital video art
- Notable work: "Monster Movie"; "Untitled (Silver)"; "Untitled (Pink Dot)"; "Night Moves"; "OM Rider"
- Website: takeshimurata.com

Takeshi Murata is an American contemporary artist who creates digital media artworks using video and computer animation techniques. In 2007 he had a solo exhibition, Black Box: Takeshi Murata, at the Hirshhorn Museum and Sculpture Garden in Washington, D.C. His 2006 work "Pink Dot" is in the Hirshhorn's permanent collection, and his 2005 work "Monster Movie" is in the permanent collection of the Smithsonian American Art Museum. His 2013 short film "OM Rider" was selected to screen as an animated short film at the 2015 Sundance Film Festival.

== Background and influences ==
Murata's parents are both architects, which he said has given him an awareness of the spaces around him. He says that focusing on animation as his medium was a natural direction for him:

I've always loved cartoons, and when I finally saw experimental animation, and what independent artists were making outside of the studio system, I knew it's what I wanted to do. The combination of the studios art, in time, with sound, and having the illusionary powerful [sic] to create immersive narrative spaces, is exciting. I still love it.

Murata also cites horror movies as an influence.

== Works and reception ==
Key works completed by Murata in the mid-2000s exploited the introduction of distortions to previously recorded videos, a practice commonly found in glitch art. "Monster Movie," "Untitled (Silver)," and "Untitled (Pink Dot)," all made between 2005 and 2007, share this characteristic.

A 2009 article in Artforum about Murata's art noted that "the artificial palette, flashing lights, abstract patterns, and coarsely pixelated texture of Pink Dot and other works by Murata locate him in the tradition of electronic animation pioneered by John Whitney and Lillian Schwartz. But while his predecessors were testing the computer's ability to replicate the cinematic illusion of movement, Murata uses the tools of consumer-level film-editing software to undo that illusion, with trails of pixel dust tracking the changing positions of the image from frame to frame.".

=== "Monster Movie" ===
Display notes for the work "Monster Movie" in the 2015 Smithsonian American Art Museum exhibition Watch This! Revelations in Media Art state:

"Monster Movie" is a mesmerizing digital video projection with an aggressive audio track. Murata sourced video from the 1981 B-movie Caveman, and beginning with a process called datamoshing, mixed it into a kind of digital liquid. Much as [Raphael Montañez] Ortiz punched holes in 16mm filmstock, Murata punched virtual holes through the compressed video file, disrupting the video's logic and revealing a monster beneath the surface of the video, inside the digital script."

=== Untitled (Silver) ===
A 2006 review of Murata's work "Untitled (Silver)" stated: "A main part of Murata's technique involves digitally compressing the footage so that the movement of a series of frames is reduced to a single twitching image that records only the net difference in movement from one frame to the next. Ironically, this high-tech wizardry recalls old-fashioned animation and moving-picture precedents such as flipbooks, zoetropes and Eadweard Muybridge's motion studies. The video's visual effects also evoke the way Impressionist painters broke down images into brushwork and blurriness, which similarly gave way to abstraction. For his part, Murata likens the liquid look of his digital distortions to the physical deterioration of old film stock."

=== "I, Popeye" ===
Since 2010, Murata has also created artworks that exploit the hyperreality achievable with the use of digital rendering. "I, Popeye," a parodic twist on the original Popeye cartoon series, was Murata's first work in representational animation and "a distinct break from the psychedelic and abstract digital imagery that he was originally known for." Critic Lauren Cornell writes:

At the time it was made, the copyright for the original cartoon character had expired in the EU but remained in effect in the United States: a highly anachronistic situation—especially given the boundlessness of contemporary culture—and one that inspired Murata to test the blurry grounds of fair use. He used the cartoon's original cast but, their entanglements are too abject and too contemporary to be mistaken for the real thing—for instance, in one scene, a remorseful Popeye visits Bluto in the hospital as he recovers from an apparent assault; in another, Popeye wistfully lays flowers on Olive Oyl's grave. While it is conceptually consistent with his earlier work, in that he uses emergent software and digital technologies to subvert commercial perfection and create disorder, "I, Popeye" was his first foray into representational animation, a direction that he has continued in vastly more complex narratives, such as "OM Rider" (2014)."

=== Synthesizers and "Night Moves" ===
The 2013 exhibition Synthesizers at Salon 94 in New York included seven large-scale pigment prints depicting interior spaces populated with objects that were either created with computer graphics or by using stock images found online, together with the video "Night Moves," created jointly with Billy Grant. According to a contemporaneous review by Brienne Walsh, "Night Moves" features

the studio's interior, rendered in three dimensions by combining scanned photographs of the space. Objects lifted from the scans and animated on the computer—a pink nightgown, a desk chair, a tripod—pulsate, sway, liquefy and occasionally start maniacally laughing. Continually shattering into prismatic shards that reassemble into unified forms, the environment finally dissolves into a flurry of fragments....Night Moves is a sophisticated amalgam of these two facets of his work, the abstract and the narrative."

=== "OM Rider" ===
Murata's digitally animated short film "OM Rider" was described as "funny and weird" in a New York Times review of the artwork's display at Salon 94 in New York in December 2014. The two main characters are "a restless, punk werewolf in a black T-shirt and cutoff shorts, and a grumpy old man who is bald, but for wispy white hair hanging down below his ears," who eventually end up fighting each other.

Murata and the film's sound designer Robert Beatty discussed the inspiration and process of making "OM Rider" in an interview for the podcast Bad at Sports in December 2013. According to Murata, "I've always loved horror movies, so I thought that [the Ratio 3] space could be really cinematic and tried to transform the gallery by blacking it out. It was a perfect opportunity to go in this direction."

=== "Melter 3-D" ===
Murata's digitally animated kinetic sculpture "Melter 3-D" captivated visitors to the Frieze New York Art Fair in May 2014. As reported in the New York Times,

For technical magic, nothing beats Takeshi Murata's "Melter 3-D." In a room lit by flickering strobes, a revolving, beachball-size sphere seems made of mercury. A hypnotic wonder, it appears to be constantly melting into flowing ripples."

Murata created this illusion by projecting digital animation onto a rotating sphere, with the spinning of the sphere synchronized with the blinking of a strobe light. This makes it a form of 3D-zoetrope. According to Liz Stinson, writing in Wired:

Murata was able to take the same principles used centuries ago to create repeating zoetrope animations, and add some high-tech gloss. He started by designing the object on his computer with 3-D modeling software. The looping melting effect you see is the result of syncing the spinning of the sphere with the blinking of the strobe. "It's the same concept as old cylindrical zoetropes, where you look through the slits to see the animation," says Murata. "But in a 3-D zoetrope, the slits are replaced with strobe lights, and drawings or photographs can become objects."

=== Institutional survey ===
In June 2015, the Kunsthall Stavanger in Stavanger, Norway put on the first institutional survey of Murata's work, comprising his digital animations and photographic prints.

== See also ==
- List of films at the 2015 Sundance Film Festival#Animated Short Films
