= Kalliope Amorphous =

American interdisciplinary artist

- Born: 1978 (age 46–47); Providence, Rhode Island, United States
- Occupation(s): Artist, photographer
- Website: kalliopeamorphous.com

Kalliope Amorphous (born 1978) is an American interdisciplinary artist who works in a variety of media, including photography, poetry, performance art, and olfactory art. She is primarily known for her conceptual self portraits. She lives and works in New York City.

== Style ==
Amorphous uses in-camera effects, modified lenses, mirrors, and handmade camera attachments. Her style, as she describes it, is conceptual photography with an emphasis on pictorialism and surrealism. Acting as her own model, she explores the meaning of identity by assuming different roles. Amorphous has stated that the "study of consciousness" and the concept of duende are primary influences in her work. She has also cited butoh as an influence.

== Overview ==
Born in Providence, Rhode Island, Amorphous attended high school in Rehoboth, Massachusetts. Upon graduating, she moved to New York City, where she experimented with modeling, acting, and performance poetry. In a 2008 interview with art critic Brian Sherwin, she cited her early social involvement in the New York City theater and cabaret scenes as influences in her early photographic work.

A self-taught photographer, Amorphous began working exclusively with self-portrait photography while living in Rhode Island in 2007. Her early self-portraits focused on character studies, costuming, and makeup.

Amorphous' 2009 Resurrecting Ophelia series of self-portraits cast her as the fictional character Ophelia. Like much of her later work, the series relied on in-camera effect with Amorphous positioned behind glass, acrylic, and textiles. The series was exhibited in Amorphous' hometown in a solo exhibition at the Community College of Rhode Island and appeared in print in the premier issues of Dark Beauty magazine and The Omen Magazine.

In 2011, Amorphous was named in GLAAD's annual Top 100 Artists. She received honorable mention for the Julia Margaret Cameron Award in the category of street photography from The Worldwide Photography Gala Awards.

Amorphous's recent projects use distortion mirror boards created with reflective material. In her series Glass Houses, she appears in a series of surreal and distorted self-portraits which look as if they were submerged in water. Of the series, Lancia Trendvisions wrote: "The mirror is just a surface. Exactly like the photographs that portray it. They cannot depict what is hidden under their patina: the distortions of our fears, the destructuring push of our desires. But photographer Kalliope Amorphous searches for just that impalpable spirit." In her distorted self-portraits, Amorphous explores what she calls "the fluid nature of identity".

In addition to self-portraits, Amorphous began working with glitch art in 2013. In 2014, she completed a series of experimental photographs of performance artist Marina Abramović. Amorphous appears opposite Matthew Avedon in the music video Savage Way to Live for the Brooklyn-based band Relations.

In 2015, her short film Contrast And Time was included in the Forever Now Project exhibited at Mona Foma. Forever Now was an international project in response to the Voyager records of 1977, and culminated in a golden record containing 44 artists.

Since 2016, Amorphous has been documenting the people and landmarks in her neighborhood on the Upper West Side of Manhattan in New York City in a series of street photographs. She is one of few female street photographers working in the genre.

During the 2016 Presidential election, Amorphous endorsed candidate Hillary Clinton and completed a series of fine art photographs of Clinton on the campaign trail.

In 2019, a 3D Virtual Exhibition of some of her works from her series Glass Houses was published as part of the permanent exhibitions in the TOROSIETE Museum of Contemporary Art.

== Perfume brand ==
Amorphous is the founder and perfumer behind the indie perfume house Black Baccara. She founded the brand in 2010. The house specializes in artisan perfume oils and Eau de Parfums with themes similar to those Amorphous works with in her visual art.
