= Mel Alexenberg =

Israeli artist, art educator, and writer

Mel Alexenberg מל אלכסנברג
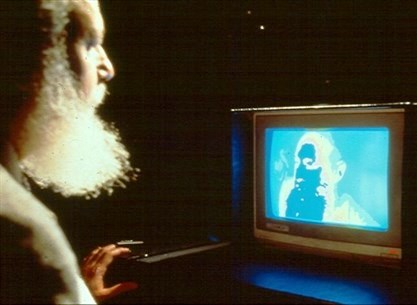
- Biofeedback-generated self-portrait created at MIT Center for Advanced Visual Studies
- Born: Mel Alexenberg; 1937 (age 88–89); New York City, USA
- Known for: experimental art

Mel Alexenberg (Hebrew: מל אלכסנברג; born February 24, 1937) is an American-Israeli artist, art educator, and writer recognized for his pioneering work exploring the intersections of art, science, technology and digital culture. He experimental with digital fine art prints in the 1980s that are in 30 museum collections worldwide, circumglobal cyberangel flights honoring Rembrandt in 1989 and in 2019.

Alexenberg has educated generations of young artists as professor at Columbia University and universities in Israel, research fellow at MIT Center for Advanced Visual Studies, dean at New World School of the Arts in Miami, and head of the art department at Pratt Institute where he taught the first course on creating art with computers. In Israel, he was Founding Head in 1977 of Ramat Hanegev College affiliated with Bar-Ilan University where he was professor of education. In 1971, he was Founding Director of the Center for Creative Learning, Experimental School of University of Haifa that continues to educate Israeli youth as The Open School more than half century later.

== Early life and education ==
Mel (Menahem) Alexenberg was born to Abraham and Jeanne Alexenberg in New York City. His integration of art and science had its origins in his childhood summers in the Catskill Mountains studying the creatures of the forests and ponds and making drawings and paintings of them in their natural habitats and in imaginary worlds. In his teenage years, he would skip school and spend days at the MoMA, The Met, and the Whitney when it was in Greenwich Village.

He earned degrees in biology from Queens College, City University of New York in 1958 and in education from Yeshiva University in 1959. While working in science education and was test center coordinator for the American Association for the Advancement of Science curriculum project “Science: A Process Approach,” he studied at the Art Students League of New York and exhibited his paintings exploring the growth patterns of plants at Ligoa Duncan Gallery on Madison Avenue.

Alexenberg developed a way for children to create a simple computer described in his 1964 paper “The Binary System and Computers” published in the National Science Teachers Association journal Science and Children, now with his other papers in the Smithsonian's Archives of American Art. He wrote the books Light and Sight and Sound Science inviting children to discover how their senses of sight and hearing reveal the secrets of light and sound.

In 1965, he began his doctoral studies at New York University excited about the artistic possibilities of digital technologies when the first computer plotter arrived at NYU. He was given access to the massive computer to create geometric pictures on rolls of paper on which he painted with colorful pigments in the ancient technique of painting with molten waxes. His computer-generated painting “Noise Control” was reproduced as the cover the April 1966 issue of International Science and Technology. This was the first digital artwork in which a high tech computer generated image was transformed into a high touch painting.

Alexenberg was awarded an interdisciplinary doctorate in art, science, and cognitive psychology from NYU in 1969 for his research on creativity in art and science. He expanded his doctoral dissertation into a book Aesthetic Experience in Creative Process that includes his interviews of prominent American artists and scientists who described how creativity shaped their work.

== Works ==
Alexenberg's papers are in the collection of the Archives of American Art of the Smithsonian Institution.

Alexenberg was a fellow at the MIT Center for Advanced Visual Studies in the 1980s. In 1985, he and his son Ari offered “Mind-Leaping Workshops” to corporate executives, intended to develop creative thinking.

=== Digitized Homage to Rembrandt ===
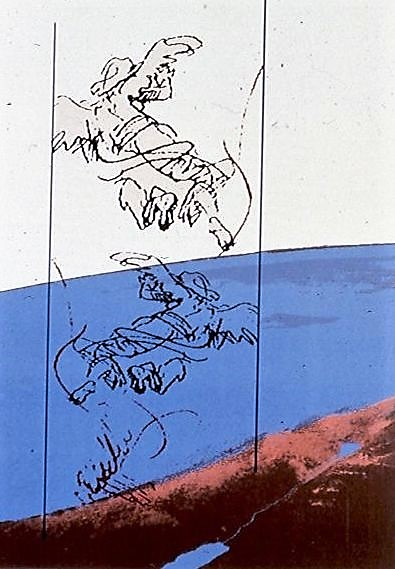
Rembrandt-inspired cyberangels ascending from the Land of Israel

Computer-generated variations of Rembrandt's angels were a recurring theme in Alexenberg's art from 1985 to 1990. They were exhibited in 1987 in High Tech/High Touch: Computer Graphics in Printmaking at Pratt Manhattan Gallery, The Artist and The Computer at the Bronx Museum of the Arts, at the Fine Arts Museum of Long Island, and in a solo exhibition Computer Angels at The Fine Arts Center Art Gallery, Stony Brook University. Digitized Homage to Rembrandt: Jacob's Dream (1986–87), an etching and aquatint from a computer-generated image, is in the collection of the Metropolitan Museum of Art.

=== Four Corners of America ===
A series of eight artworks linking the four corners of United States was created by Alexenberg as the official artist of Miami's Centennial in 1996 when he was dean at New World School of the Arts. Alexenberg's artworks connected Miami, San Diego, Seattle, and Portland (Maine).

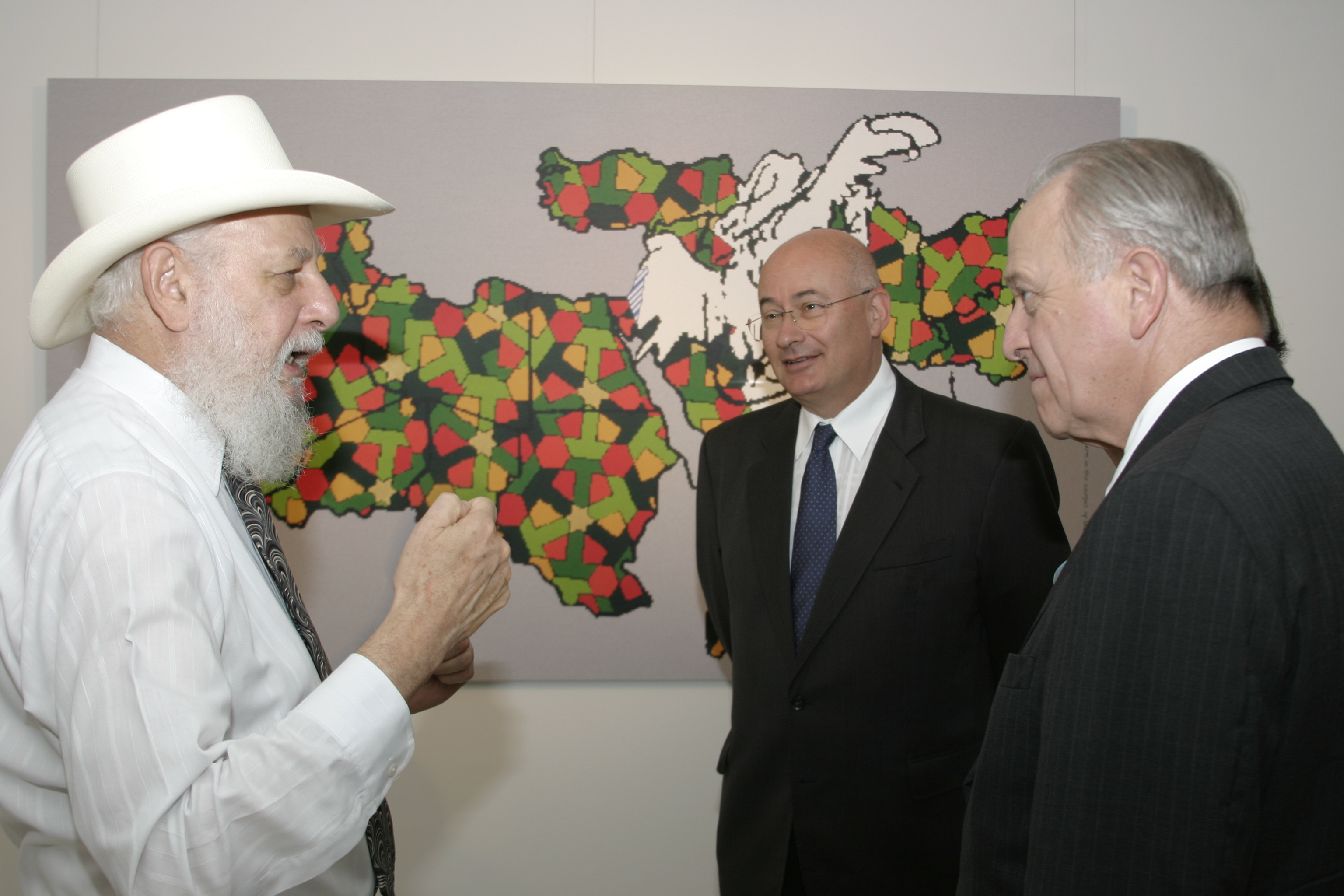
Ambassadors of Israel and USA in Prague listen to Alexenberg explain his aesthetic peace plan aided by his painting derived from Islamic art

=== Cyberangels: Aesthetic Peace Plan for the Middle East ===
Alexenberg's exhibition Cyberangels: Aesthetic Peace Plan for the Middle East in 2004 at the contemporary art gallery of the Jewish Museum in Prague proposed that peace in the Middle East can emerge from a fresh metaphor in which the Muslim world sees Israel's existence as Allah's will.

The ambassadors of the United States and Israel to the Czech Republic participated in the exhibition opening. The explanatory catalog of the exhibition was coupled by the artist's statement in Leonardo: Journal of the International Society for the Arts, Sciences and Technology (vol. 30, no. 3).

=== AT&T Circumglobal Cyberangel Flight ===
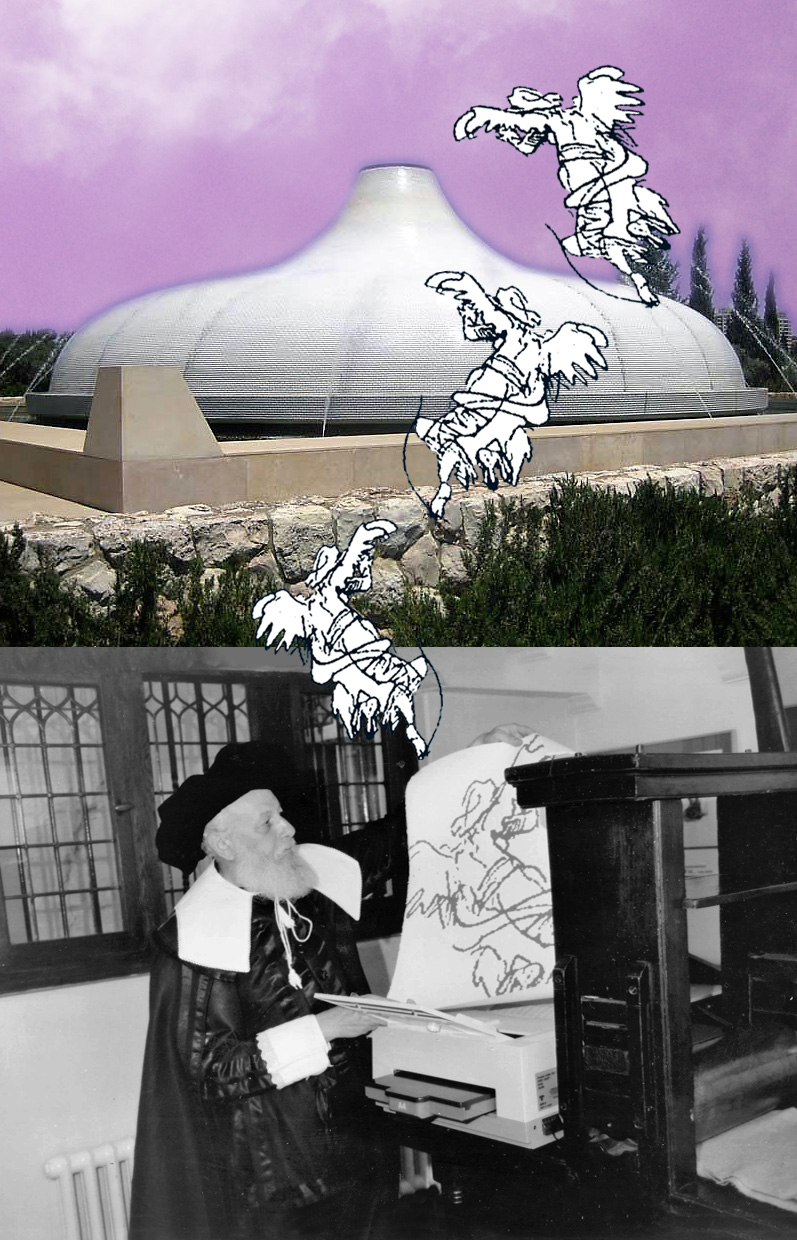
Alexenberg launches cyberangel from Rembrandt's studio to Israel Museum on circumglobal flight

An AT&T sponsored telecommunications art event on October 4, 1989, honoring Rembrandt on the 320th anniversary of his death. Alexenberg launched a digitized image of a Rembrandt inspired cyberangel via fax, a leading technology of the time, on a circumglobal flight from New York to the Rembrandt House Museum in Amsterdam, Israel Museum in Jerusalem, University of the Arts in Tokyo, Museum of Contemporary Art in Los Angeles and back New York. After a five-hour flight around the planet, the deconstructed angel was reconstructed at its starting point.

Millions throughout North America watched the cyberangel return from its circumglobal flight over the major TV networks' broadcasts from New York . It was featured in sixty newspaper articles and the AT&T annual report.

The AT&T cyberangel flight was preceded in 1987 by Alexenberg's launching cyberangels from Long Island to connect it to the 48 states on mainland USA.

=== LightsOROT: Spiritual Dimensions of the Digital Age ===
LightsOROT is an interactive electronic art environment created by Mel Alexenberg in collaboration with Otto Piene and his colleagues and graduate students at MIT Center for Advanced Visual Studies to explore the spiritual dimensions of the digital age. At Yeshiva University Museum in New York from 1988 to 1989, 25 interactive artworks were exhibited using laser animation, holography, fiber optics, biofeedback-generated imagery, computer graphics, interactive electronic media, and spectral projections. ARTnews wrote: “Rarely is an exhibition as visually engaging and intellectually challenging as ‘LightsOROT.’ Its success lies in Alexenberg and Piene's contributions.”

== Bibliography ==
=== Books ===
- Sound Science (Prentice-Hall, 1968)
- Light and Sight (Prentice-Hall, 1969)
- Aesthetic Experience in Creative Process (Bar-Ilan University Press, 1981, ISBN 965-226-013-4)
- LightsOROT: Spiritual Dimension of the Electronic Age (MIT and Yeshiva University Museum, 1988)
- The Future of Art in a Digital Age (Intellect Books/University of Chicago Press, 2006, ISBN 1-84150-136-0)
- Dialogic Art in a Digital World (R. Mass Publishers, Jerusalem, 2008, ISBN 978-965-09-0227-8) (in Hebrew)
- Educating Artists for the Future: Learning at the Intersections of Art, Science, Technology and Culture (Intellect Books/University of Chicago Press, 2008, ISBN 978-1-84150-191-8)
- The Future of Art in a Postdigital Age: From Hellenistic to Hebraic Consciousness (Intellect Books/University of Chicago Press, 2011, ISBN 978-1-84150-377-6)
- Through a Bible Lens: Biblical Insights for Smartphone Photography and Social Media (HarperCollins, 2018, ISBN 978-1-595557124)

=== Book Chapters ===
- "Autoethnographic Blogart Exploring Postdigital Relationships between Digital and Hebraic Writing". The Routledge Handbook of Digital Writing and Rhetoric. 2018. pp. 361–370. doi:10.4324/9781315518497-34. ISBN 978-1-315-51849-7.
- "From Science to Art: Integral Structure and Ecological Perspective in a Digital Age". Interdisciplinary Art Education: Building Bridges to Connect Disciplines and Cultures. National Art Education Association. 2005. ISBN 978-1-890160-31-9.
- "Semiotic redefinition of art in a digital age". Semiotics and visual culture: Sights, signs, and significance. National Art Education Association. 2004. pp. 124–131. ISBN 9781890160258.
- "Space-Time Structures of Digital Visual Culture: Paradigm Shift from Hellenistic to Hebraic Roots of Western Culture". Inter/Actions/Inter/Sections: Art Education in a Digital Visual Culture. National Art Education Association. 2010. ISBN 9781890160494.
- "Legacy Thrones: Intergenerational Collaborations in Creating Multicultural Public Art". Community Connections: Intergenerational Links in Art Education. National Art Education Association. 2004. ISBN 978-1-890160-26-5.
- "From Golem of Prague to Waze in Israel": Michael Bielicky: Perpetuum Mobile 2022 pp. 419-432, publisher: ZKM/Center for Art and Media Karlsruhe. ISBN 9783969120286

=== Journal Papers ===
- Alexenberg, Mel (January 1988). "Art with computers: the human spirit and the electronic revolution". The Visual Computer. 4 (1): 1–3. doi:10.1007/BF01901073. S2CID 6721175.
- Alexenberg, Mel (2006). "Ancient Schema and Technoetic Creativity". Technoetic Arts. 4: 3–14. doi:10.1386/tear.4.1.3/1.
- Alexenberg, Mel (June 2006). "Cyberangels: An Aesthetic Peace Plan for the Middle East". Leonardo. 39 (3): 185. doi:10.1162/leon.2006.39.3.185. S2CID 57570123.
- Alexenberg, Mel (1 September 2003). "Wright and Gehry: Biblical Consciousness in American Architecture". Journal of Cultural Research in Art Education. 21 (1). doi:10.2458/jcrae.5006. S2CID 251084247.
- Alexenberg, Mel. "An Interactive Dialogue: Talmud and the Net". Parabola. 29 (2).
- Alexenberg, Mel (2011). "Eruv as Conceptual and Kinetic Art". Images. 5 (1): 56–57. doi:10.1163/187180011X604373.
