= Jamie Fenton =

American video game programmer

Jamie Faye Fenton (born in 1954 as Jay Fenton) is a video game programmer best known for the 1981 arcade video game Gorf and for being one of the creators of MacroMind's VideoWorks software (since renamed Macromedia Director). Jamie has been active in the transgender community and transitioned from male to female around 1998.

== Biography ==
Fenton was drawn to computer technology while in school because its highly predictable nature appealed to her and it provided a haven from being picked on by other students.

In 1975, while studying computer science in the University of Wisconsin, Jamie and fellow student Tom McHugh volunteered to work at Dave Nutting Associates, who enlisted their help to redesign pinball machines and the Japanese arcade game Western Gun using Intel's 8080 microprocessor, she also later worked on the Bally Astrocade, and wrote the programming language Bally BASIC, based on Tiny BASIC.

In 1978, Jamie Fenton and Raul Zaritsky created an early example of glitch art, the 3-minute film Digital TV Dinner, played at Electronic Visualization Event 3 in Chicago. In this, Jamie Fenton was ejecting the cartridge from the live Bally Astrocade to create the visual glitches. The second version was aired in 1979 on WTTW Chicago. She also punched the game console.

in 1981, while working at Midway Manufacturing, Jamie Fenton designed the game Gorf.

Four years later, she co-created the program VideoWorks, which then became Macromedia Director, then, after being bought by Adobe, Adobe Director. This software was a precursor of the software Flash.

In 1995, with Cindy Martin and JoAnn Roberts, she created and launched tgforum.com, an online forum for transgender people. It still exists in 2024.

In 2018, Digital TV Dinner was exhibited in the Chicago New Media 1973-1992 exhibition, curated by Jon Cates. During the exhibition, she played Digital TV Breakfast, a video game by Whitney (Whit) Pow, inspired by Digital TV Dinner. The same year, she created a new piece, Primordial Glitch Art, where she filmed herself creating glitches by ejecting cartridges from a Bally Astrocade, while explaining how to obtain those glitches.

== Works ==
- Datsun 280 ZZZAP (1976)
- Checkmate (1977)
- Digital TV Dinner (1978)
- Bally Astrocade BASIC re-write (1980)
- Gorf (1981)
- Robby Roto (1981)
- Primordial Glitch Art (2018)

== See also ==
- List of women in the video game industry
- Women and video games
- Women in computing
