= Nia Burks =

American artist

- Born: 1984 (age 41–42)
- Education: Virginia Commonwealth University, Maryland Institute College of Art
- Website: www.niaburks.com

Nia Burks (born 1984) is an American artist and educator working with the mediums of video, performance and sound. Her work incorporates popular culture, found footage, social media, performance, and pole dance elements, often focusing on representations of the body and self-sourced truth. She investigates new media theory and gender theory. Burks is also the owner of Butter and Filth, a pole dancing studio and school, as well as Hard Soft Press, a non-fiction based publishing imprint. She currently lives in Richmond, Virginia.

== Education ==
Burks attended Virginia Commonwealth University graduating in 2006 with a BFA in Sculpture. She received an MA in Digital Media from Maryland Institute College of Art in 2007 and an MFA from Virginia Commonwealth University’s Photography and Film Department in 2009.

She was a professor at Virginia Commonwealth University teaching in the Art Foundation, Photography and Film, and Kinetic Imaging department until 2022, when she left to pursue Butter & Filth full time. Her faculty profile lists teaching and research areas including new media theory, video, memesis, movement and dance, sound, gender theory, and web art.

Burks has also been the artist-in-residence at Takt Kunstprojektraum in Berlin as well as Samband íslenskra myndlistarmanna in Reykavik, Iceland.

== Artistic practice ==
Burks’s video work incorporates found footage, popular culture, social media, as well as mediated and unmediated performance. Her practice examines the relationship between mediated images, identity, and truth. Her pedagogical practice includes using iterative and generative processes to distill her students ideas into cohesion.

Her work Booty Meat appeared in the context of New Media, Sex, and Culture in the 21st Century, a 2010 exhibition and accompanying journal issue organized through the Museum of New Art and NMEDIAC. In his introduction, curator and scholar Jonathan Lillie discussed Burks’s interest in the tension between the possibilities for individual expression online and the imitation of other users’ performances. This is the core investigation of Burks work.

Her extensive exhibition record includes Sex Cells at 3rd Ward in Brooklyn in 2009; Irresistible Apparatus at Studio 8 West in Richmond in 2010; and Symbiotic Output at Alice Gryphius Kunstraum in Berlin and Three Inch Canvas at Jyväskylä Art Museum in Finland in 2011. She was represented internationally by Art Claims Impulse in Berlin from 2010-2015. Burks has taken a step away from commercial galleries and exhibitions to focus on Butter & Filth project since 2015.

Burks has also written about contemporary art and performance. Her published writing includes an essay on Art Basel Miami Beach for Digital America and an article on developing pole performances for the International Pole Convention. In the latter, she described approaching pole dance as a fine art medium informed by her background in art education and theory.

== Career ==
For numerous years, Burks was a professor at Virginia Commonwealth University and the owner of Butter and Filth concurrently. She left academia in 2022. The first Butter and Filth opened in February 2018 at Hull Street, Richmond, Virginia. Burks and then co-owner moved Butter and Filth to 4840 Waller Road in Unit 310, where it currently resides. In 2024, the third location opened at 2108 Spencer Rd in Richmond, Va.

== Exhibitions ==
Burks' work has been featured in numerous shows worldwide. Her work has also been featured on Rhizome at the New Museum and Creativity Online’s “Pick Of The Day” shortly after the creation of Angry Gamers in 2010.

== Selected shows ==
- Symbiotic Output, Berlin Germany, 2011
- Three Inch Canvas, Jyväskylä Art Museum, 2011
- Irresistible Apparatus, Studio 8 West, Richmond, Virginia, 2010
- New Media, Sex and Culture in the 21st Century, Museum of New Art, Detroit Michigan, 2010
- Glitch Festival, Chicago, Illinois, 2010
- Sex Cells, 3rd Ward, Brooklyn, New York, 2009
