= Michael Betancourt =

American critical theorist, film theorist, art & film historian (b. 1971)

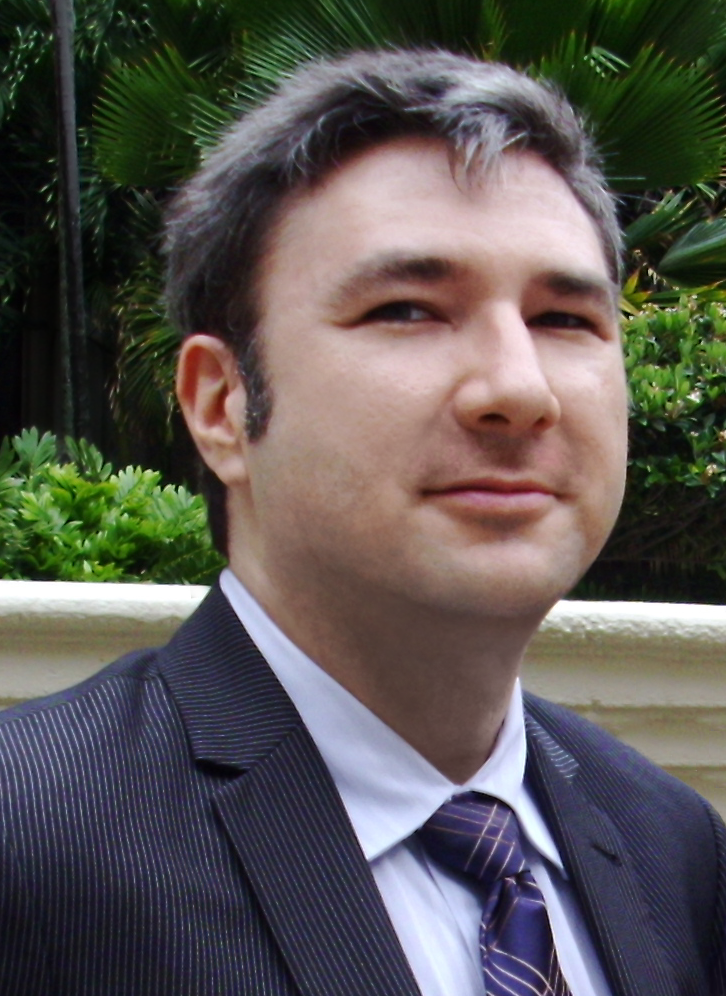
- Born: 1971; New Jersey, US
- Education: Temple University; University of Miami
- Known for: film maker, installation art, video art, visual music

Michael Betancourt (born 1971) is a critical theorist, film theorist, art & film historian, and animator. His principal published works focus on the critique of digital capitalism, motion graphics, visual music, new media art, theory, and formalist study of motion pictures.

== Early life and education ==
Betancourt was born in New Jersey in 1971. He enrolled at Temple University for film studies and received an MA in Film Studies at the University of Miami, studying under film historian William Rothman. He also received his Ph.D degree from the University of Miami in Interdisciplinary Studies, focusing on Art History, Communications/Film Studies, and History.

In addition to scholarly work, he has written popular articles and reviews on art, art theory, and culture for magazines, including The Atlantic, Make Magazine, Miami Art Exchange and Art Scene.

Betancourt's father is the archaeologist Philip P. Betancourt and his brother is the author John Gregory Betancourt. Michael spent his summers in both Crete and Greece and worked as a photographer on his father's excavation at Pseira.

== Career ==
His first film exhibition was Archaeomodern, shown at the Ann Arbor Festival of Experimental Film in 1993. In 1995, his film, a self-referential film in 30 sentences, won a Director's Citation award at the Black Maria Film Festival. Other works have screened in Art Basel Miami Beach, Contemporary Art Ruhr, Athens Video Art Festival, Festival des Cinemas Differents de Paris, Anthology Film Archives, Millennium Film Workshop, the San Francisco Cinematheque's Crossroads, and Experiments in Cinema, among others. His video Telemetry screened as an installation during the first Athens Video Art Festival. Other installations were site-specific: as part of Art Basel Miami Beach, the Sites-Miami project in 2004, and at the South Florida Art Center's 800 Lincoln Road exhibition space as part of the Face-to-Face series in 2011.

Betancourt has been a professor of motion media design at the Savannah College of Art and Design since 2009.

== Visual music ==
Betancourt is both a historian and practitioner of visual music. He exhibited his videos at visual music showcases such as the iotaCenter and SoundImageSound. He created a system for designing abstract animations based on synesthesia that he uses in his animations.

Betancourt discovered that the inventor Mary Hallock-Greenewalt produced the earliest hand-painted films known to exist; these were used with the earliest version of her Sarabet machine that automatically synchronized colored lights with records. The Sarabet device was an early music visualizer of the type now included with computer audio-players. Even though these films were not designed to be motion pictures themselves, they were created with templates and aerosol sprays, which produced repeating geometric patterns in the same way as the hand-painted films of Len Lye from the 1930s.

He wrote a short monograph and a large collection of short essays, pictures, and other archival material about the visual music group Lumonics composed of Mel and Dorothy Tanner of South Florida.

Most of his other visual music-related scholarships take the form of anthologies of technology patents or reprints of earlier texts on visual music machines designed for live performance.

== Formalist motion pictures ==
Using psychological studies of motion perception, Betancourt argued that the motion seen in motion pictures is identical to the motion seen in paintings. He terms this second type painterly motion and argues that the subjective viewer invents both kinds: "Unlike motion in the real world that is physically eminent, the motion we see in movies and through the technique of painterly motion is entirely a result of human perception. The motion we see does not exist outside our perception." Work by painters Francis Bacon and Peter Paul Rubens present the type of motion effect identified by Betancourt as being psychologically the same as the real motion of actual objects in the world.

Betancourt's construction of formalism suggests a broader scope for applications of film theory than simply motion pictures since it focuses on both painting and experimental film. This approach was developed in his book, Structuring Time: notes on making movies. He approaches the motion picture as a series of distinct, but related domains of aesthetic manipulation: camera, image, editing, projection, screen, and sound. His construction of formalist motion pictures argues against a medium-specific definition and chooses a broad description of formal potentials instead.

=== Glitch videos ===
Animated example of what a glitched video can look like by Michael Betancourt. (Mae Murray in a screen test)

Betancourt has written about glitch art as both an artist and a critic and employs glitches in his videos. José Manuel García Perera, a Universidad de Sevilla painting professor, criticized Betancourt's work with glitch, stating:

Michael Betancourt's video work, part of the so-called glitch art, which focuses on the failure that can occur within the digital realm, has been here the basis for a comparative study between different concepts of movement in art, as well as between a current and a past art, a comparison that allows us to see clearly how technological advances have produced radical changes in the physical, spatial and mobile nature of the artwork. Betancourt's investigation proposes a new kinetic art that becomes critical through error, mimics the real-time movement that contemporary culture demands, and uncovers the artificiality of images that mimic reality as if they wanted to replace it."

The use of glitch art to create critical media is a focus of Betancourt's theoretical writing on glitch art.

David Finkelstein, in writing about his glitch video series Going Somewhere on Film International, stated:

In Betancourt's hands, data moshing becomes a form of cultural resistance. Instead of utilizing the smooth, illusionistic motion of digital cinema, which you would typically see in a commercial movie theater, he deliberately pulls apart the codes and exploits its errors to deconstruct the movies and show us how they do their tricks. He pulls apart the narrative tropes of Sci-Fi at the same time that he pulls apart the pictures, pixel by pixel, creating a radically open form that resists the hypnotic myth-making of Hollywood.

== The digital ==
In a series of articles collected as The Critique of Digital Capitalism, Betancourt criticized what he called the "immaterialism" of digital technology, specifically the claims that digital technology ends scarcity through being able to create value without expenditure, unlike the reality of limited resources, time, and expenses; it is based on denying the actual costs of access, creation, production, and maintenance of computer networks and technologies. He sees the "aura of the digital" as both the capitalist fantasy of continuous expansion made possible by digital technology and as the anti-capitalism fantasy of a world without scarcity or needs for capitalist production.

=== The aura of information ===
Betancourt's concept of the "aura of information" is the separation made possible by digital technology of the information and the ways that information is carried by technology. This idea claims the digital transcends physical form by separating meaning from the physical objects that present meaningful information to its audience. It is the tendency to ignore the particular physical details of how we encounter information, in favor of just paying attention to the information itself.

=== Digital capitalism ===
In "Immaterial Value and Scarcity in Digital Capitalism", Betancourt proposed that the illusion of a rupture between physical and virtual production posed by the aura of the digital can be observed in the political economy of the United States, most especially in the Housing Bubble that burst in 2008. His analysis states that "Financial 'bubbles' are an inevitable result of a systemic shift focused on the generation of value through the semiotic exchange and transfer of immaterial assets." Several features marked this economy: (1) a disassociation between the physical commodity and its representation in financial markets that is global in scope, (2) a reliance on fiat currency, (3) a financialization of the economy based on debt.

Part of this analysis is a discussion of the relationship between affective labor and what he has termed "agnotologic capitalism." Affective labor is the enabler for the creation of the bubbles that are characteristic of the digital capitalist economy, Where the reduction of alienation is a precondition for the elimination of dissent. Affective labor is part of a larger activity where the population is distracted by affective pursuits and fantasies of economic advancement.

=== Automated labor ===
Automation is a recurring theme in Betancourt's discussion of digital technology and capitalism. In his discussion of the New Aesthetic, he argued that the transformations of production being created by computers and automated assembly lines belong to a larger shift in the digital capitalist economy:

The various artifacts brought together as the 'new aesthetic' are united by their orientation not towards human observation or functional utility, but rather by their invocation of productive values without human action – the aura of the digital's separation of product from all that is required to produce it: labor, capital, resources. This transition point marks a shift from the fragmentation of the assembly-line where tasks are organized around the repetitive action of masses of human labor (itself an organization that implies semiotic disassembly and standardization) to an automated fabrication where the design is generated on digital machines and then implemented by other digital machines without human labor in the fracture process; the necessity of human-as-designer thus comes into question as it is the only aspect of non-machine agency remaining, an element whose necessity is challenged by evolutionary algorithms and automated design.

The replacement of human labor by automation poses a problem for capitalism according to Betancourt because capitalism is dependent on the exchange of labor for wages that are then spent purchasing the production of that labor. The elimination of labor by automation follows what Betancourt has called a fundamental law of the ideology of automation: "Anything that can be automated, will be." (Note: This "law" is not original to Betancourt. See, for example, "The Support Economy: Why Corporations Are Failing Individuals and the Next Episode of Capitalism - The Widening Rift Between Corporations and Society", a 2002 interview with Shoshana Zuboff and James Maxmin.) Following the automation of physical production, the transformation of formerly intellectual labor by "autonomous production that began as a "labor-saving" procedure now saves all human labor in/as the productive machine: it is this specific dimension of automated (immaterial) labor using digital technology that reflects an ideology of production-without-consumption." The elimination of labor by automated labor presents a paradox for Betancourt's digital capitalism because the wages paid to workers for their labor are the basic element around which all of capitalism is built.

== As an artist ==
Betancourt's movies are usually abstract and belong to the tradition of visual music. He has claimed these videos are related to his work as a theorist. He has exhibited his work since 1992 when Archaeomodern screened at the Ann Arbor Film Festival; since then he has produced many videos that have screened on television and in festivals, galleries, and museums.

He described his video Telemetry as "a documentary whose subject is those things that fall outside our direct perception. It adopts an abstract form precisely because what is represented has no direct physical form... instead of our electronic intermediaries, satellite and deep-space probes, send back numerical data we interpret intellectually to understand what it is like in those places we cannot go, what those things we cannot see look like." This concern with the relationship of scientific and speculative interpretations of space appears throughout his work.

The Experimental TV Center's Video History Project has a biography. (Note: Michael Betancourt's work can be found in the Experimental Television Center's Repository in the Rose Goldsen Archive of New Media Art, Cornell University Library)

=== Notable works ===
==== Videos ====
- Aurora, 2001, Microcinema International
- She, My Memory, 2002
- Year, 2003
- Telemetry, 2005
- Casual Wave, 2007
- One, 2010
- Disks of Newton, 2010
- Contact Light, 2012
- Dancing Glitch, 2013
- The Dark Rift 2014
- The Dogs of Space 2015
- Going Somewhere 2015

==== Aesthetic Hazard project ====
Betancourt's Aesthetic Hazard is a public installation project that imitates the more common barrier tapes marked "Caution" or "Police Line – Do Not Cross," but instead states: Aesthetic Hazard – Do Not Look. He installed this project in a variety of locations in Miami and Chicago.

=== Publications ===
- Glitch: Designing Imperfection, eds. Iman Moradi, Ant Scott, Joe Gilmore, Christopher Murphy, Mark Batty Publisher, 2009, ISBN 0979966663
- Stickers: Stuck-Up Piece of Crap: From Punk Rock to Contemporary Art, eds. DB Burkeman, Monica LoCascio, Rizzoli, 2010, ISBN 0789320819
- 100 Artists' Manifestos, ed. Alex Danchev, Penguin Books, 2011, ISBN 0141191791
- The Manifesto in Literature, vol. 3, The Literature of Society Series, St. James Press, 2013 ISBN 1558628665
- What's Next? Kunst nach der Krise: Ein Reader, Kulturverlag Kadmos, 2012 ISBN 9783865992000

== Bibliography ==
=== Books ===
- Two Women and a Nightengale: a novel in collage (2004)
- Artemis: a tragedy of collage (2004)
- Structuring Time (2004, second edition, 2009)
- Re–Viewing Miami (2004)
- Visual Music Instrument Patents (Volume 1) (2004)
- The Lumonics Theater (2005)
- Mary Hallock–Greenewalt: The Complete Patents (2005)
- Thomas Wilfred's Clavilux (2006)
- Jose Parla, Walls, Diaries, Paintings (2011)
- The History of Motion Graphics: From Avant-Garde to Industry in the United States (2013)
- The Critique of Digital Capitalism (2015)
- Beyond Spatial Montage: Windowing, or the Cinematic Displacement of Time, Motion and Space (2016)
- Glitch Art in Theory and Practice: Critical Failures and Post-Digital Aesthetics (2017)
- Semiotics and Title Sequences: Text-Image Composites in Motion Graphics (Routledge Studies in Media Theory and Practice) (2017)
- Synchronization and Title Sequences: Audio-Visual Semiosis in Motion Graphics (Routledge Studies in Media Theory and Practice) (2017)
- Title Sequences as Paratexts: Narrative Anticipation and Recapitulation (Routledge Studies in Media Theory and Practice) (2018)
- Harmonia: Glitch, Movies and Visual Music (2018)

=== Essays ===
- Educating Buffy: The Role of Education in Buffy the Vampire–Slayer, Transylvanian Journal, vol. 3, no. 2, 1998
- Chance Operations / Limiting Frameworks: Sensitive Dependence on Initial Conditions, Tout-Fait, 2002
- Disruptive Technology: The Avant-Gardness of Avant-Garde Art, CTheory, 2002
- Motion Perception in Movies and Painting: Towards a New Kinetic Art, CTheory, 2002
- Precision Optics / Optical Illusions: Inconsistency, Anemic Cinema, and the Rotoreliefs, Tout-Fait, 2003
- Welcome to Cyberia, Miami Art Exchange, September 19, 2003.
- Labor/Commodity/Automation: A Response to "The Digital Death Rattle of the American Middle Class", CTheory, 2004
- Serial Form as Entertainment and Interpretative Framework: Probability and the 'Black Box' of Past Experience, Semiotica, issue 157, vols. 1–4, 2005
- Paranoiac-Criticism, Salvador Dalí, Arcimboldo and Superposition in Interpreting Double Images, Conscious, Literature and the Arts, vol. 6, no. 3, December 2005
- Mary Hallock-Greenewalt's Abstract Films, Millennium Film Journal, no. 45/46, Fall 2006
- Abstract Film Palimpsests: On the Work of Rey Parla, Bright Lights Film Journal, 2006
- The Aura of the Digital, CTheory, 2006
- Same As It Ever Was – Acts of Digital Re-Authoring, VJTheory, 2006
- Proposing a Taxonomy of Abstract Form Using Psychological Studies of Synaesthesia / Hallucinations as a Foundation, Leonardo, vol. 40, no. 1, February 2007
- The Valorization of the Author, Hz, 2007
- The Valorized Artist: Incorporation into the Perpetual Art Machine, Bright Lights Film Journal, 2007
- Synchronous Form in Visual Music, Offscreen, vol. 11, nos. 8–9 Aug/Sept 2007
- Wallpaper and/as Art, Vague Terrain 09: The Rise of the VJ, 1 March 2008
- Intellectual Process, Visceral Result: Human Agency and the Production of Artworks via Automated Technology, Journal of Visual Art Practice, Vol. 7 no. 1, 2008
- The State of Information, CTheory, 2009
- Technesthesia and Synaesthesia, Vague Terrain, 9 February 2009
- Immaterial Value and Scarcity in Digital Capitalism, CTheory, 2010
- The Birth of Sampling, Vague Terrain, 2011
- Automated Labor: The New Aesthetic and Immaterial Physicality, CTheory, 2013
- The Demands of Agnotology::Surveillance, CTheory, 2014
- Critical Glitches and Glitch Art, Hz, 2014
- The Limits of Utility, CTheory, 2015
- The Invention of Glitch Video: Digital TV Dinner (1978) (preview)

=== Exhibition catalogs ===
- José Parlá, Adaptation / Translation, Elms Lesters Painting Rooms, London, 2008
- Rostarr, Oculus Velocitas, Il Trifoglio Nero, Genova, Italy, 2009

== See also ==
- Critical theory
- Culture industry
- Cultural studies
- Glitch art
- List of Glitch Artists
- Popular culture studies
