= XCOPY (artist) =

Digital artist

- Other name: XCOPYART
- Occupation: Digital artist
- Years active: 2014–present
- Notable work: Right-Click and Save As Guy, Grifters, Max Pain and Frens

XCOPY is a London based digital artist associated with crypto art and NFTs. His real identity is unknown. He creates digital glitched artworks usually concerning death, dystopia and apathy through flashing imagery and distorted loops, with hints to the cryptocurrency community regarding concepts, mood and terminology. He is regarded as one of the highest selling NFT artists.

== Career ==
XCOPY started posting his digital artworks on the social media platform Tumblr, in August 2010. He gained online popularity throughout the years, posting more than a thousand individual works. In 2018, he was one of the first known artists to make NFTs out of his artworks. As cryptocurrency grew in popularity, initially online and among crypto enthusiasts, and later in both the digital and traditional art worlds, XCOPY's art gained increasing traction, eventually achieving record sales.

On August 1, 2022 XCOPY released a statement on his website, declaring all of his previous and future work his work to become CC0, relinquishing copyrights to his works which were not collaborations or derivative content, hereby dedicating those rights to the public domain.

=== Right-Click and Save As Guy ===
Right-Click and Save As Guy

Right-Click and Save As Guy is one of XCOPY's best known artworks. The piece started receiving attention on 13 March 2021, in a BBC World News article. It was bought for about $7,000,000 in December 2021, making it one of the highest selling NFTs.

== Gallery ==
All Time High in the City (2018).

A Coin for the Ferryman (2018). The associated NFT was one of the most expensive NFTs sold in 2021.

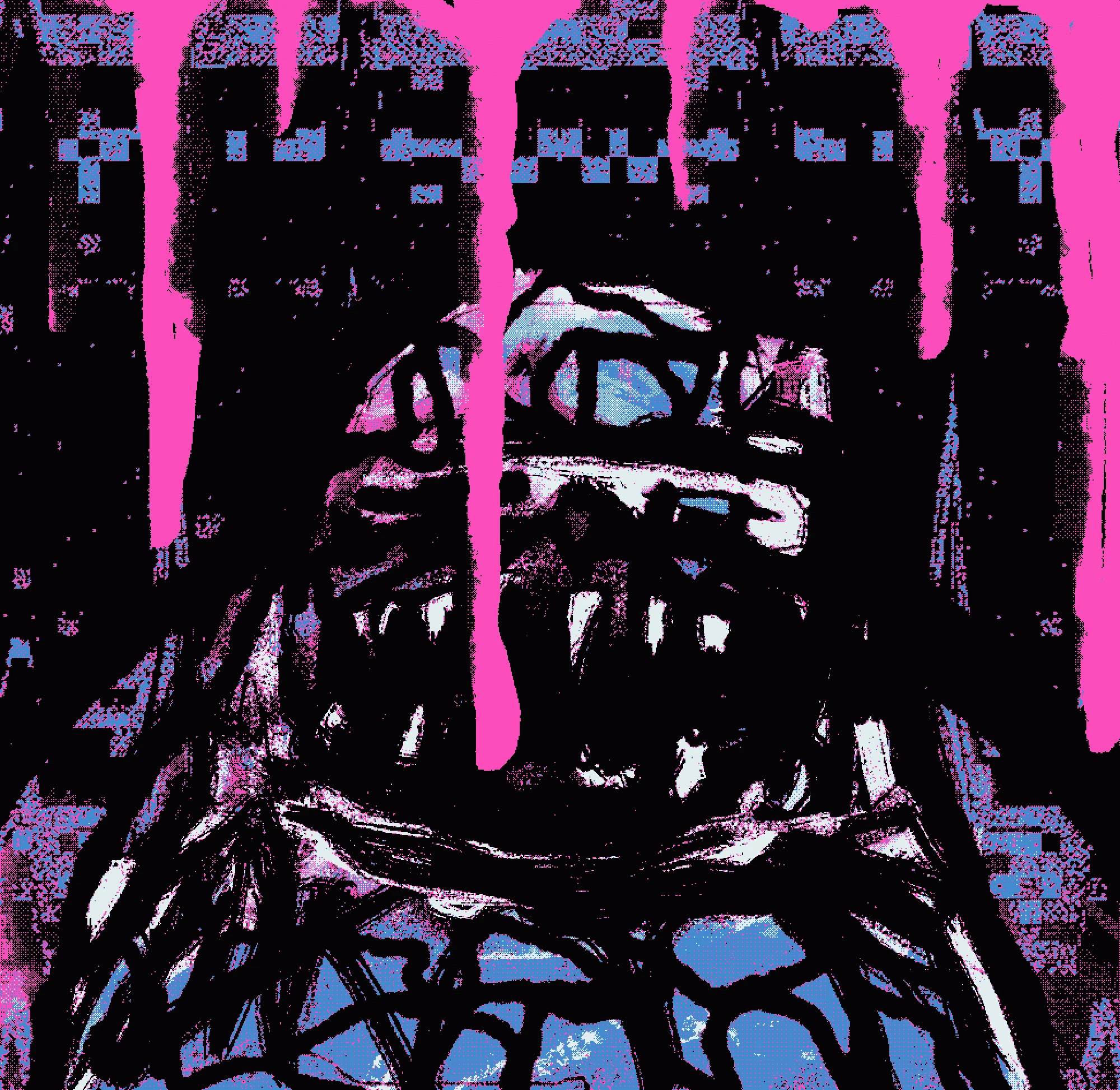
Cracked (2018)

Last Selfie (2019)

Max Pain (2022), released as an open edition on NiftyGateway in 2022. 7394 associated NFTs sold in the 10 minute mint window for a total sale price of nearly $23 million USD.

Some Asshole. The associated NFT sold for $3.8M USD

== Group exhibitions ==
- “The Future is Unwritten” at Villa Ciani in Lugano, 2021
- “DART2121” at Museo della Permanente in Milan, 2021
- “NFTn Digital Art Exhibition" at Art Innovation Gallery in Milan, 2022
- "Coin Laundry" at Art Basel Miami Beach in Miami Beach, 2025
