= Circuit bending =

Modification of an electronic device to create an instrument

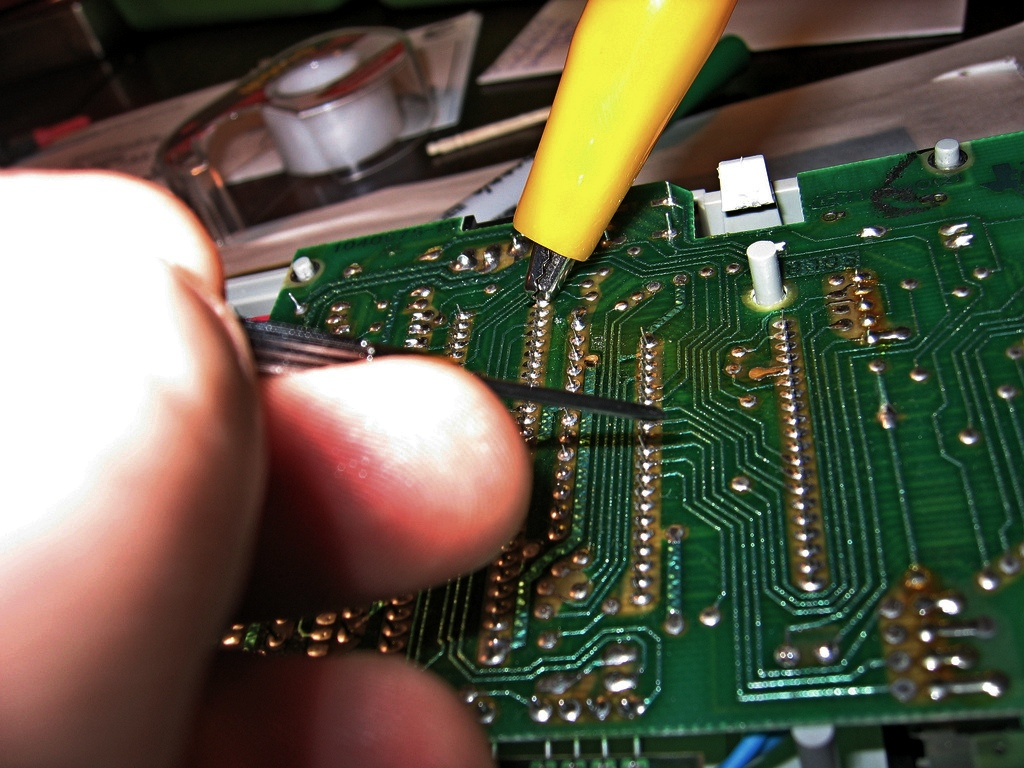
Probing for "bends" using a jeweler's screwdriver and alligator clips

Circuit bending is the modification of circuits in electronic devices such as children's toys and digital synthesizers to change or control their sound output, usually by dismantling the machine and adding components such as switches and potentiometers.

Circuit bending has commonly been associated with noise music, though many other contemporary musicians have experimented with it.

== Experimental process ==
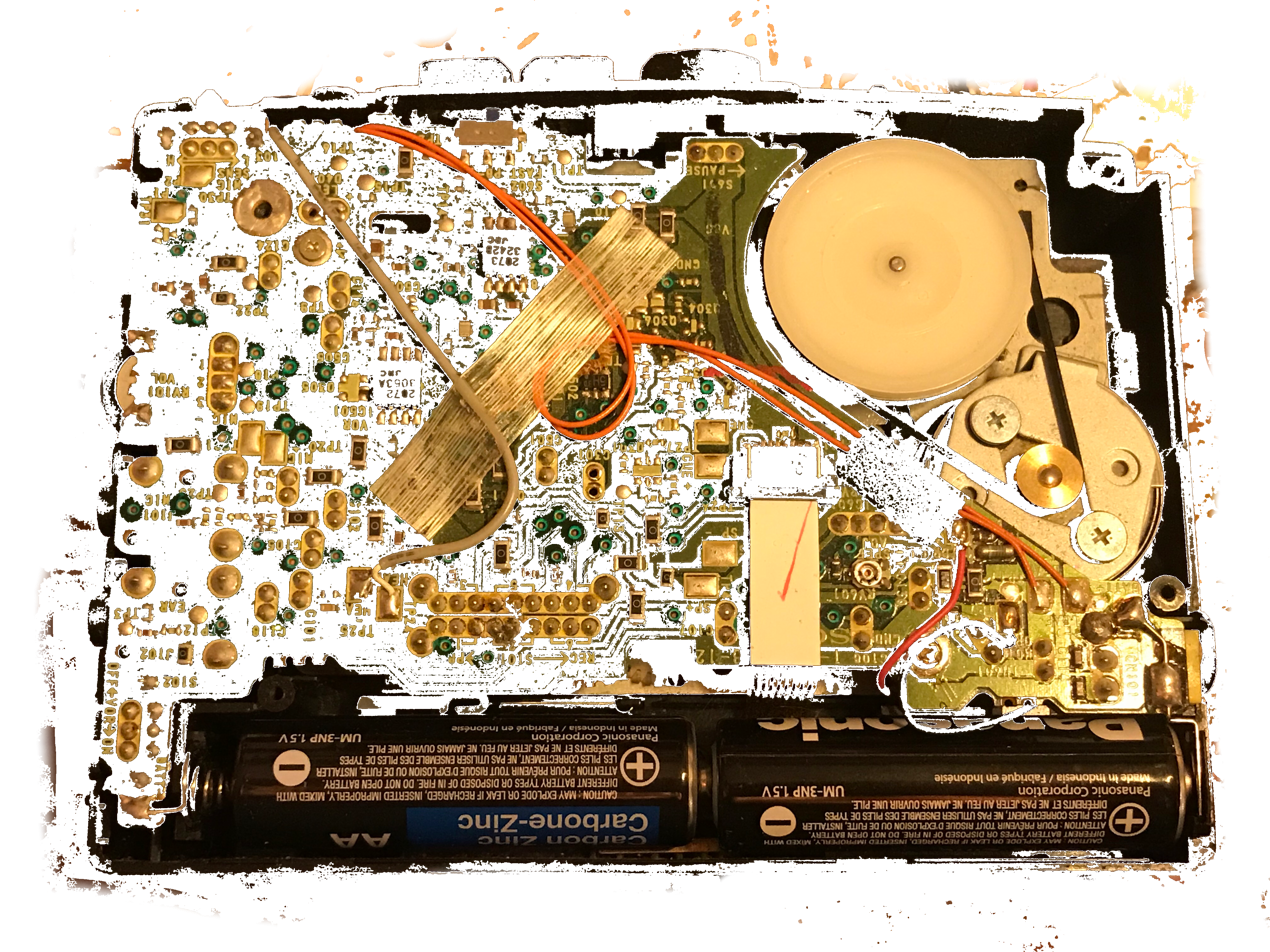
A circuit-bent Walkman

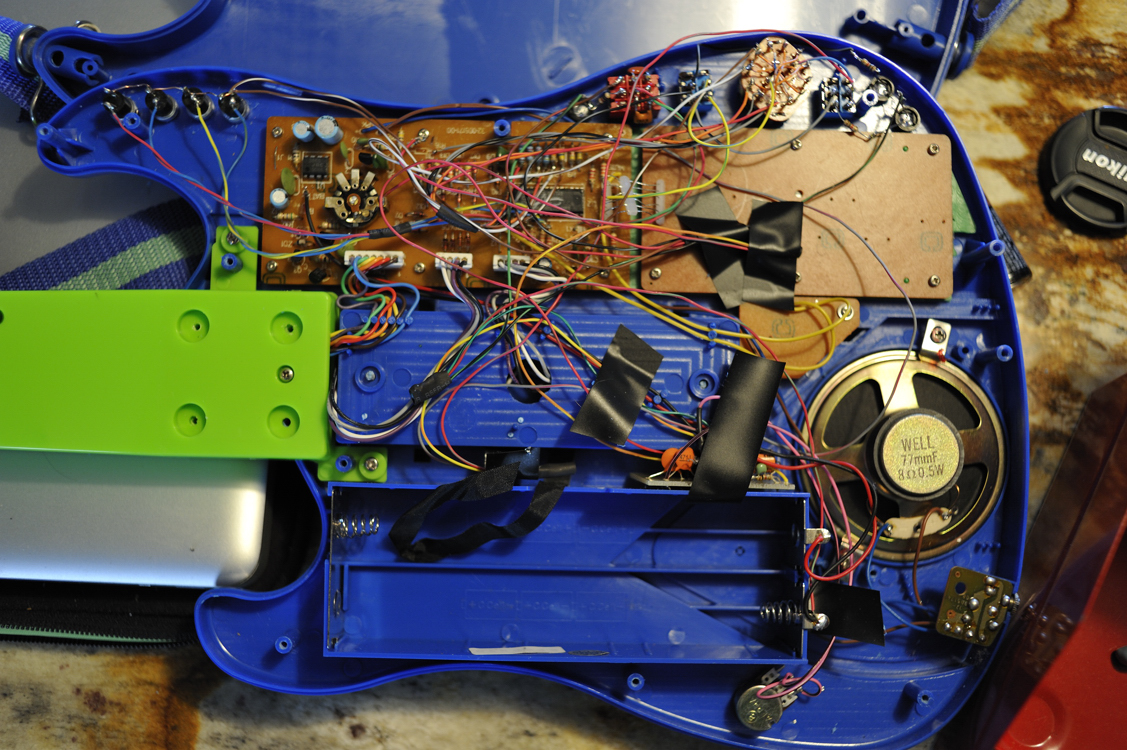
A 1989 Kawasaki toy guitar used in a circuit bending project

The process of circuit bending involves experimenting with inexpensive second-hand electronics that produce sounds, such as toys, keyboards, drum machines, and electronic learning products.

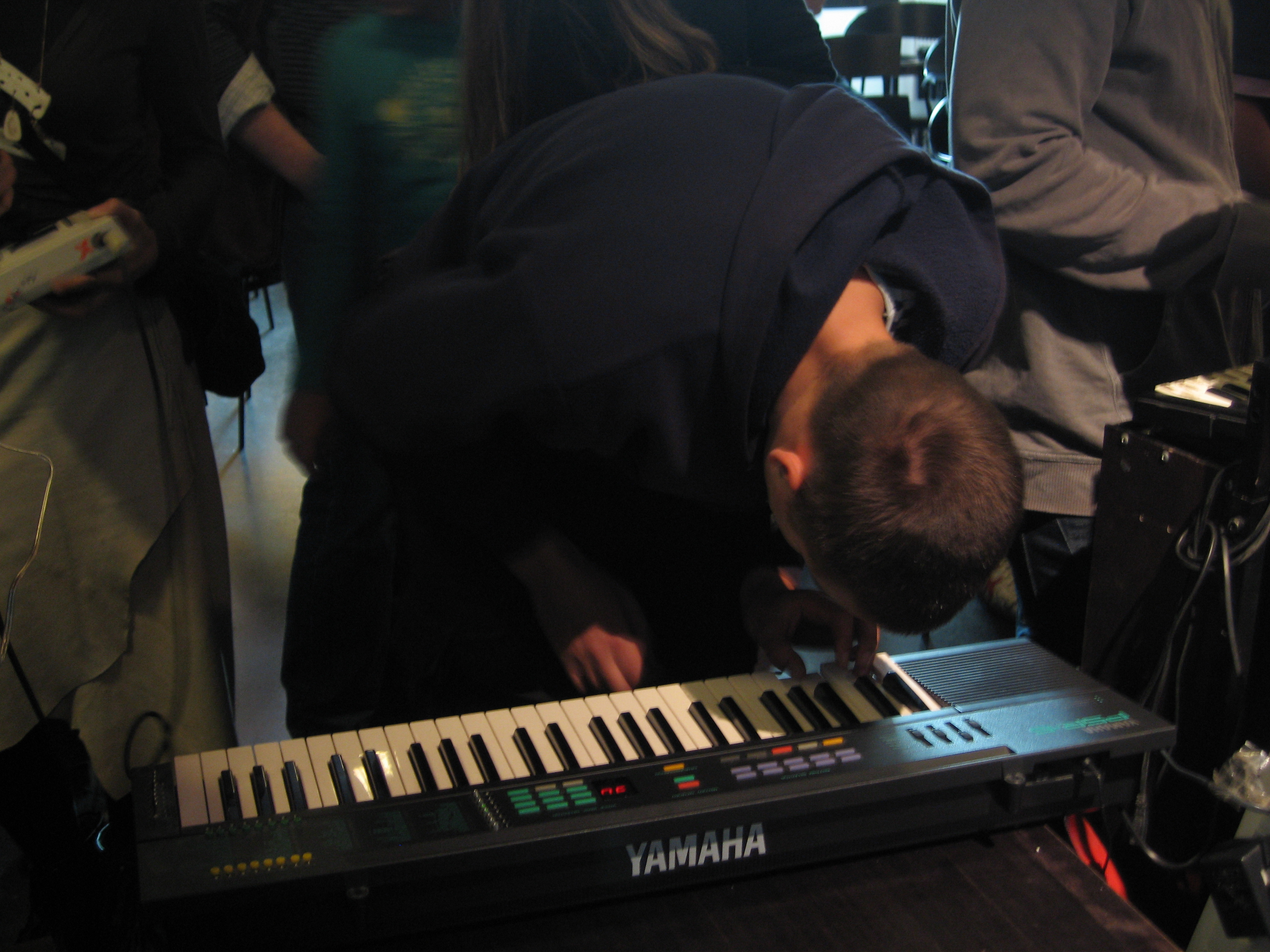
A Yamaha PSR-6 used in a circuit bending project

== History ==
Serge Tcherepnin, designer of the Serge modular synthesizers, discussed his early experiments in the 1950s with the transistor radio, in which he found circuit points that responded sonically to touch, and wired them to "body contacts" on the plastic chassis.

In the late 1960s, musician and technologist Reed Ghazala happened upon a similar phenomenon when, according to his recollection, a metal object fell onto the exposed circuit of his RadioShack amplifier, shorting it out and resulting in unexpected sounds. This experience inspired him to begin building circuit bent instruments intentionally. Ghazala coined the term "circuit bending" for the practice in 1992. He was described by Motherboard as the "father of circuit bending."

Starting in 1984, Swiss duo Voice Crack began creating music by manipulating common electronic devices in a practice they termed "cracked everyday electronics."

== Notable users ==
- Broadcast
- Peter Gabriel
- King Crimson
- Modified Toy Orchestra
- Mark Mothersbaugh (Devo)
- Trent Reznor (Nine Inch Nails)
- The Rolling Stones
- Ana da Silva (The Raincoats)
- Voice Crack
- Tom Waits
- Paul Meany (Mutemath, Twenty One Pilots)

== See also ==
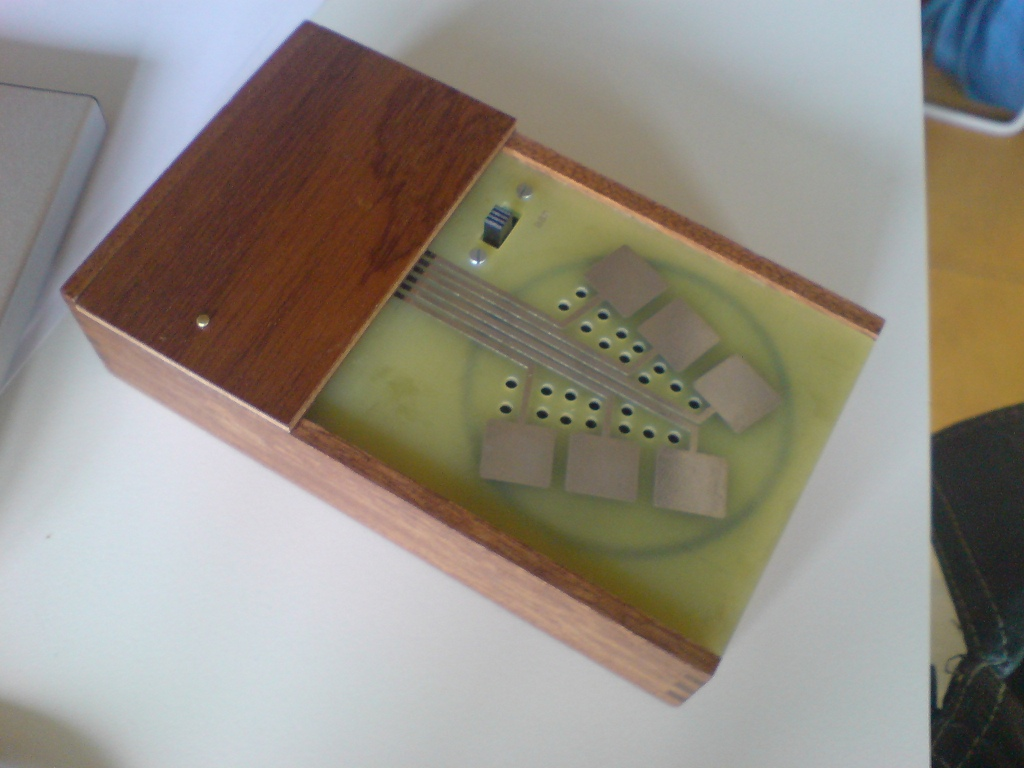
Kraakdoos

- Atari Punk Console
- Chiptune
- Data bending
- Glitch (musical genre)
- Glitching
- Kraakdoos (CrackleBox)
- Lo-fi music
- MIDIbox
- MOS Technology SID
- Music Tech Fest
- NIME
- Noise music
