= Sporto Kantes =

French electronic music band

Sporto Kantes are a French electronic music band, founded in 1998.

== Career ==
The band was born from the meeting of Benjamin Sportes and Nicolas Kantorovwicz, bassist of Les Wampas. Sportes played Rockabilly in the 80's with Eduardo Leal de la Gala, (Wreckless Eric/Ltno, Gala and the Muzer) and Kantorovwicz thrash, but they play a melt of genres in their album: dub, jazz, reggae, hip hop, and also Brazilian music. The band have worked from samples with an Akai S 2000 on their tracks.

== In popular culture ==
- Their song "Slits" appears in the first episode of season 6 of the TV show Skins.
- Their song "Lee" was used as a theme for the French comedy series Kaboul Kitchen on Canal+ in 2012.
- Their song "Whistle" was used in the ad campaign for the Renault Twingo II in 2012.
- Their song "Whistle" is featured in the French film Blue is the Warmest Colour (2013) during Adèle's birthday party scene.

== Discography ==
=== Albums ===
Year	Album	Peak positions
Year	Album	FR
2001	Act 1	–
2004	2nd Round	113
2008	3 At Last	95
2012	4	123

=== Maxis ===
Year	Album	Peak positions
Year	Album	FR
1999	Nickson	–
2000	Party	–

== Compilation albums ==
- 2000: Catalogue 2000
- 2002: Catalogue 2002
- 2002: The Catalogue of...

=== Singles ===
Year	Single	Peak positions	Album
Year	Single	FR	Album
2012	"Lee"	66	
