= Ryota Matsumoto (artist) =

Japanese artist and media theorist

- Born: Tokyo, Japan
- Education: Architectural Association School of Architecture; Glasgow School of Art; University of Pennsylvania
- Occupation: Artist
- Website: ryotamatsumotostudio.com

Ryota Matsumoto (松本 良多, Matsumoto Ryōta) is a Japanese artist, writer, and educator. He is known as the theorist of the postdigital movement and hybrid art. He has been an adjunct professor at the Transart Institute for Creative Research, University of Plymouth and serves as a research associate at the New Centre of Research and Practice. He is a fellow of British Art Network and the City of Dallas Office of Arts and Culture. Besides his solo work, he has collaborated with Kisho Kurokawa, Peter Christopherson, and MIT Media Lab.

== Early life and education ==
Born in Tokyo, Matsumoto was raised in Japan and Hong Kong. He received a Master of Architecture degree from the University of Pennsylvania in 2007 after his undergraduate studies in art and design theory at the Architectural Association School of Architecture in London and the Mackintosh School of Architecture, the Glasgow School of Art from 1992 to 1995.

== Works ==
Matsumoto has received the Visual Art Open International Artist Award, Florence Biennale Mixed Media 2nd Place Award, Premio Ora Prize Italy 5th Edition, Premio Ora Prize Spain 1st Edition, the International Society of Experimental Artists Best of Show Award, Donkey Art Prize III Edition Finalist, Best of Show IGOA Toronto, the ArtAscent Journal Gold Artist Prize, Art Kudos Best of Show Award, Electronic Language International Festival Media Art Finalist, Lynx International Prize Award, Lumen Prize Finalist, and Western Bureau Art First Prize as a new media artist. His artistic approach is noted for transcending traditional boundaries of visual art, integrating digital technologies, analog media, and interdisciplinary design. His works are in the permanent collections of the University of Texas at Tyler and the Center for Digital Narrative, the University of Bergen. Matsumoto had held solo exhibitions at BYTE Gallery at Transylvania University in 2015, Los Angeles Center for Digital Art in 2016, and Alviani ArtSpace, Pescara in 2017.
