= Clavilux =

Device used for performance of light art

Clavilux is the term coined by the artist Thomas Wilfred to refer to his mechanical invention that allowed the creation and performance of lumia, which was Wilfred's term for light art.

From Latin, Clavilux means "Light played by key."

Wilfred built his first Clavilux, Model A, from March to May 1919.

While Wilfred intended the term to refer to any device that could be used to perform Lumia, the name Clavilux was not widely adopted by other artists working with light. As such the term is closely associated with Wilfred and his mechanical vocabulary. The only other artist known to have built a Clavilux is W. Christian Sidenius, who was an ardent admirer and later good friend of Wilfred's. Sidenius built a theatre behind his home to house his Clavilux and host Lumia recitals during the summer months.

Wilfred also built sixteen smaller home Clavilux models which he also called "Clavilux Juniors." There are seven known to be extant, most of which are in private collections.

Two full-sized Claviluxii, Model E, (1924) and Model G (1936) were rescued in 2003. A 501(c)3 not-for-profit, Clavilux.org, has been formed to restore the Model E to working condition, and it plans on holding public recitals as soon as the machines are functional.

== See also ==
- Color organ
- Visual music
- Music visualization
- Oskar Fischinger
- Mary Hallock-Greenewalt
