= William Moritz =

American film historian (1941–2004)

- Born: May 6, 1941; Williams, Arizona, U.S.
- Died: March 12, 2004 (aged 62); Mokelumne Hill, California, U.S.
- Occupation: Film historian

William Moritz (May 6, 1941 – March 12, 2004) was an American film historian who specialized in visual music and experimental animation. His principal published works concerned abstract filmmaker and painter Oskar Fischinger. He also wrote extensively on other visual music artists who worked with motion pictures, including James and John Whitney and Jordan Belson; Moritz also published on German cinema, Visual Music, color organs, experimental animation, avant-garde film and the California School of Color Music.

== Early life ==
Moritz was born in Williams, Arizona and raised in California and Arizona. His father Edward Moritz, a German immigrant, influenced his son's interest in music and literature. In an interview Moritz related the importance of his early experiences with animation:

I saw a lot of animation in movie theatres, while growing up (there was no television then), like Mickey Mouse, Donald Duck, Porky Pig, Woody Woodpecker cartoons, character animation made by studios. This was a vital part of everyday life. The big transformation for me was seeing interesting animation — the UPA cartoons in particular were really a completely different change. I saw things that were actually art, and not just cartoons.

Moritz received his Ph.D. in comparative literature from the University of Southern California in 1968; though he took courses in Cinema Studies, his degrees were in comparative literature, possibly due to what one colleague speculates was the lack of "a credible Cinema Studies program until the 1980s." (Deneroff 2004)

== Scholarship ==
Moritz developed his interest in the work of Oskar Fischinger while a student at USC in 1958. His early enthusiasm for Fischinger's work became the focus of his career: "I saw my first Fischinger film, and it popped all my buttons!" Moritz's first major critical work on Fischinger was published in Film Culture, in an issue devoted largely to this extensive essay about Fischinger, in 1974. In 1969, Moritz had begun his decades-long study, aided by Fischinger's widow Elfriede, finally culminating in the major biographical work Optical Poetry: The Life and Work of Oskar Fischinger (2004). (The title is an allusion to An Optical Poem, a short film made by Fischinger for Metro-Goldwyn-Mayer in 1937). Optical Poetry is regarded as a major study of Fischinger's life and work. It received a Willy Haas Award as best book publication at cinefest - International Festival of German Film Heritage 2004.

Moritz had a long career as teacher and researcher of film and the humanities. He taught humanities and film history, and in the course of his career worked at a wide variety of institutions: Occidental College, the Otis Art Institute, Pitzer College, UCLA, USC, the American University Center (in Calcutta, India). In 1987 he began teaching courses on the "History of Experimental Film," "History of Animation" and "Theory of Comedy" at CalArts. He also worked at the Creative Film Society (now-defunct), and at radio station KPFK, as a film and music critic. As a film curator, he programmed screenings at a variety of Southern California venues including Theatre Vanguard. He was also involved in film preservation, for which he received an award from Anthology Film Archives.

Moritz was himself a filmmaker, making 34 experimental films during his lifetime. He was a published poet, and two of his plays were produced. His performance piece The Midaswel Show was staged for several performances.

His most significant contributions however are widely thought to be in the criticism and history of abstract film, experimental film, animation and visual music, as well as his promotion of little-seen films, which he had screened to audiences worldwide.

== See also ==
- Clavier à lumières
- Color organ
- Louis Bertrand Castel
- Mary Hallock-Greenewalt
- Thomas Wilfred
- Oskar Fischinger
