= Mary Ellen Bute =

American film director and animator (1906–1983)

Mary Ellen Bute

Mary Ellen Bute (November 21, 1906 – October 17, 1983) was a pioneer American film animator, producer, and director. She was one of the first female experimental filmmakers, and was the creator of some of the first electronically generated film images. Her specialty was visual music; while working in New York City between 1934 and 1958, Bute made fourteen short abstract musical films. Many of these were seen in regular movie theaters, such as Radio City Music Hall, usually preceding a prestigious film. Several of her abstract films were part of her Seeing Sound series.

== Biography ==
A native of Houston, Mary Ellen Bute studied at the Pennsylvania Academy of the Fine Arts, then stage lighting at Yale University's Drama School. She studied the tradition of color organs, as a means of painting with light. She worked with Leon Theremin and Thomas Wilfred and was also influenced by the abstract animated films of Oskar Fischinger. Bute's film-making has two relatively distinct modes. She created a series of abstract films exploring the relationship of sound and image in cinema, and a second body of work focused on the relation of language and cinema through adaptation of literary sources. Bute began her filmmaking career collaborating with Joseph Schillinger on the animation of visual representations of music. Her later films were made in partnership with the cinematographer Ted Nemeth, whom she married in 1940. In fact, all her films were produced by Ted Nemeth Studios until 1952.

Before she began making films, she gave a lecture to the New York Musicological Society in 1932 titled 'Light as an Art Material and its Possible Synchronization with Sound.' In this talk, she discussed major trends in painting turning toward abstraction and dynamism, and that she believed that art should be more kinetic, to which she looked to music as the solution. However, she argued that there was no relationship between music and visual forms, her primary area of study. Thus, she determined that while musical composition could offer useful lessons in creating kinetic art forms with light, it should not be a determinant. She wanted to create new forms of art, rather than expand on pre-existing art forms. This lecture can elucidate her first completed film, Rhythm in Light (1934), a 5-minute black and white film set to Edvard Grieg's Pier Gynt Suite. She preferred to use familiar classical music to accompany her films.

In the 1960s and 1970s Bute worked on two films which were never completed: an adaptation of Thornton Wilder's 1942 play The Skin of Our Teeth, and a film about Walt Whitman with the working title Out of the Cradle Endlessly Rocking. Her final film, inspired by James Joyce, was Passages from Finnegans Wake, a live-action feature produced and directed by Bute, made over a nearly three-year period in 1965–67, and recipient of a Cannes Film Festival award.

Bute died of heart failure at New York City's Cabrini Medical Center. She was five weeks short of her 77th birthday. Six months earlier, on April 4, she received a special tribute and a retrospective of her films at the Museum of Modern Art.

== Legacy ==
Bute's work was included in the 2021 exhibition Women in Abstraction at the Centre Pompidou. In 2024 the George Eastman Museum exhibited Mary Ellen Bute: Rhythms in Light a collection of five of her films: Rhythm in Light (1934) 5 minutes, Spook Sport (1940) 9 minutes, Tarantella (1940) 5 minutes, Rhapsodie (1948) 6 minutes, and Abstronic (1952) 7 minutes, rented from Center for Visual Music archive, which has also loaned her Color Rhapsodie to a current exhibition at the Academy Museum of Motion Pictures in Los Angeles.

== Filmography ==
- Synchromy – 1933, collaboration with Joseph Schillinger and Lewis Jacobs [unfinished].
- Rhythm in Light – 1934 (b&w, 5 min.) in collaboration with Melville Webber and Ted Nemeth.
- Synchromy No. 2 – 1935 (b&w, 5.5 min.) music: Evening Star from Tannhäuser by Richard Wagner.
- Dada (1936 film) – 1936 (b&w, 3min.) short for Universal Newsreel.
- Parabola (1937 film) – 1937 (b&w, 9 min.) music: Création du monde by Darius Milhaud.
- Synchromy No. 4 - Escape (1937 film) – 1937 (color, 4.5 min.) music: Toccata in D Minor by J.S. Bach.
- Spook Sport – 1940 (color, 8 min.) music: Danse macabre by Camille Saint-Saëns. Animation by Norman McLaren.
- Tarantella (1940 film) – 1940 (color, 5 min.). Animation by Norman McLaren.
- Polka Graph – 1947 (color, 4.5 min.) music: Dmitri Shostakovich's Polka from The Age of Gold.
- Color Rhapsodie (1937 film) – 1948 (color, 6 min.)
- Pastorale (1950 film) – 1950 (color, 9 min.) music: Bach's Sheep May Safely Graze.
- Abstronic – 1952 (color, 7 min.) music: Aaron Copland's Hoe Down and Don Gillis's Ranch House Party.
- Mood Contrasts – 1953 (color, 7 min.)
- Imagination (1957 film) – 1957 (color) compilation background for musical sequence, Steve Allen Show (November 17, 1957)
- The Boy Who Saw Through – 1958 (b&w, 25 min.) (producer) stars a young Christopher Walken [not abstract].
- New Sensations in Sound – 1959 (color, 3 min.) advertising film for RCA.
- Passages from James Joyce's Finnegans Wake – 1965–67 (b&w, 97 min.) (director and co-writer) screened at the Cannes Film Festival [not abstract].
