= Mel and Dorothy Tanner =

American installation & light artists

Mel Tanner
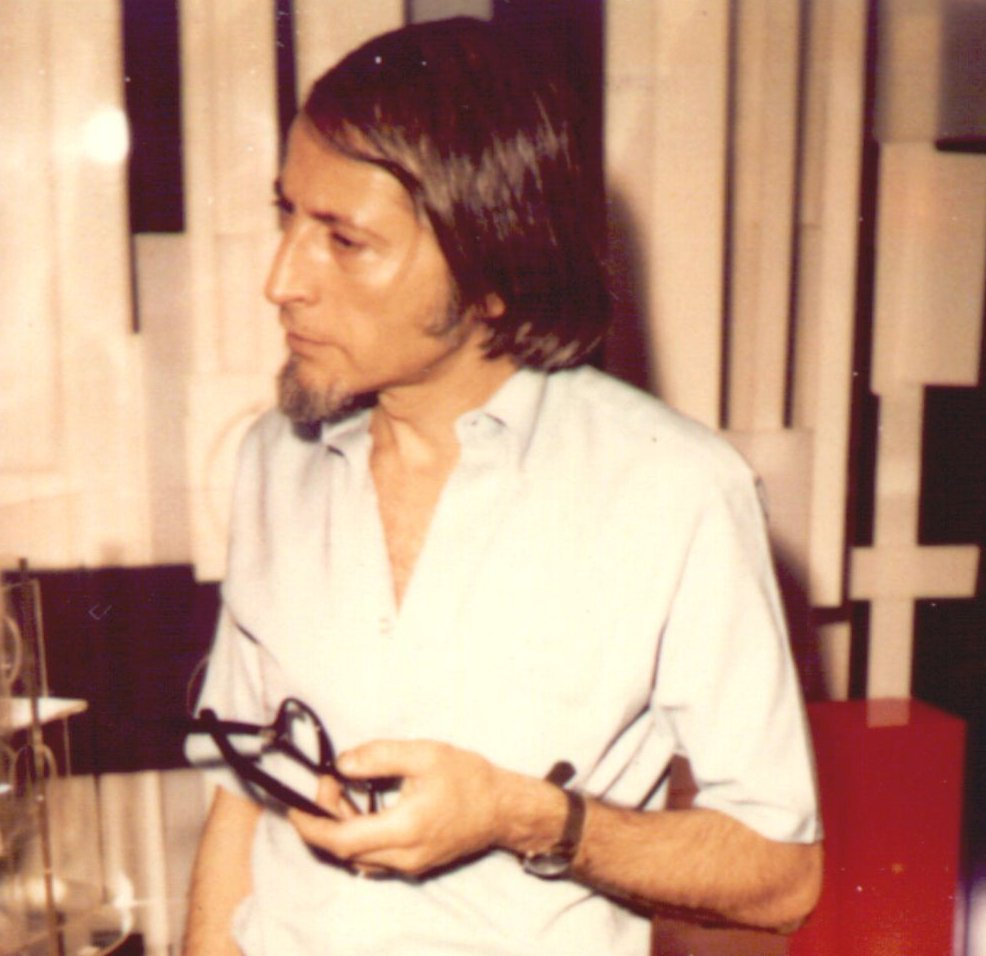
- Born: September 26, 1925; Brooklyn, New York
- Died: October 21, 1993 (aged 68); Coral Springs, Florida
- Occupation: Light artist/installation artist

Signature
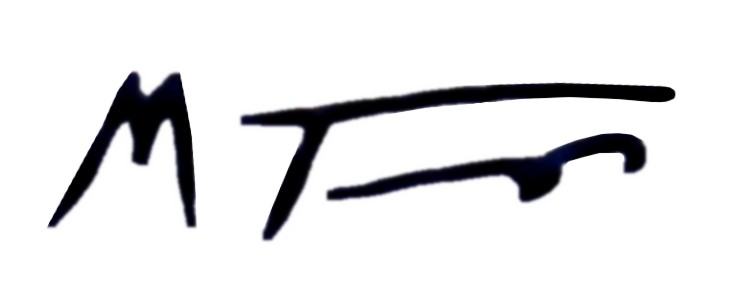

Dorothy Tanner
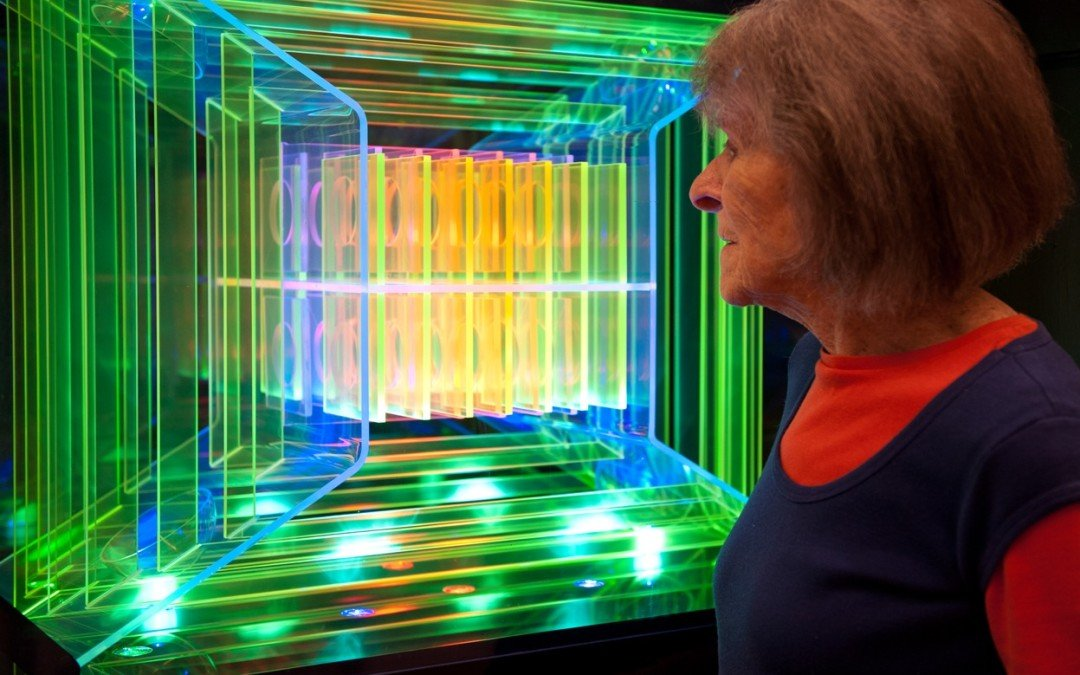
- Born: January 30, 1923; The Bronx, New York
- Died: July 23, 2020 (aged 97); Aurora, Colorado
- Occupation: Light artist/installation artist

Signature
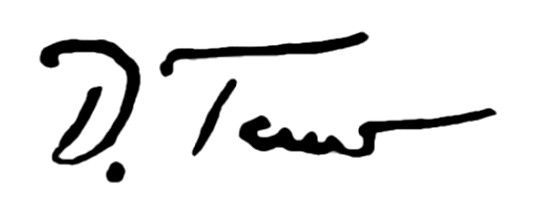

Mel Tanner (September 26, 1925 - October 21, 1993) was an American light sculptor, painter, installation artist, and videographer. His wife, Dorothy Tanner (January 30, 1923 - July 23, 2020), was an American light sculptor, installation artist, musician, videographer, and spoken word artist based in Denver, Colorado. The couple worked very closely for over 40 years. Their main project was the creation of Lumonics that consists of their light sculptures, live projection, video, electronics, and music as a total art installation. Author and art historian, Michael Betancourt, described this visual music performance work as a Gesamtkunstwerk in his book, The Lumonics Theater: The Art of Mel & Dorothy Tanner, published in 2005.

== Education ==
Mel Tanner was a World War II veteran and attended art school under the Servicemen's Readjustment Act of 1944, better known as the G.I. Bill. He first attended Pratt Institute and then the Brooklyn Museum Art School, studying painting with instructors including Max Beckmann, John Ferren, and Reuben Tam. When Dorothy first visited Mel Tanner's basement studio in Brooklyn in 1950, he painted in a pointillist style, using a palette knife rather than a brush, and mixing paint with beeswax to give the paintings texture and dimensionality. He later painted on raw canvas, creating big loose shapes in the action painting style.

Dorothy Tanner studied woodcarving with Chaim Gross at the Educational Alliance, sculpture with Aaron Goodleman at the Jefferson School of Social Science, life drawing with Gabor Peterdi and sculpture with Milton Hebald at the Brooklyn Museum Art School. She met Mel Tanner while they were both students at the Brooklyn Museum School, and married in 1951.

== Career in art (1951-1969) ==
The Tanners moved to Syracuse, New York in 1951 and founded the Syracuse Art Workshop where Dorothy taught sculpture and Mel taught painting. They taught art to children in a summer program at Syracuse University. The residence in Syracuse had a carriage house in the rear where Dorothy set up her studio, working with materials including wood, clay, plaster, and polyester, and the high ceilings enabled her to build large metal sculptures. She exhibited her new metal sculptures in a solo show at the Key Gallery in New York City in 1962, and Mel Tanner exhibited his new paintings which combined calligraphy and geometric shapes at Key that same year. Their exhibitions stimulated them to return to Manhattan. Decades later, Ms.Tanner reflected on her view of the New York art of the early 1960s:

"The art scene in New York was in turmoil. Abstract expressionism was in the late days of its heyday. Op and pop art were coming up strong, and minimalism was just around the corner."

In 1963, the Tanners returned to New York City, where they founded Granite Gallery, an artist cooperative. Norman Carton solo exhibited at the gallery in early 1964. They formed the Granite Art Association, which organized seminars, forums, and exhibitions, including The New Face in Art Forum and Exhibition in 1964 which took place at the Loeb Student Center at New York University. Participants included artists Louise Nevelson, Red Grooms, Norman Carton (moderator), and art critic Gordon Brown. The Tanners co-curated The New Face in Art Exhibition and showed their work with artists that included Louis Schanker, Murray Hantman, and Leo Quanchi. In 1965, they closed the Gallery and traveled extensively in Europe.

The Tanners returned to the U.S. in 1966, and on their way to San Francisco, they stopped in Miami to visit family members. Weary of traveling, they opened an art studio that they named Grove Studio, where they began to create their first lighted geometric shapes. This was the same time period as the Light and Space movement in Los Angeles that included Robert Irwin, Larry Bell, Helen Pashgian, DeWain Valentine, and James Turrell, who were also experimenting with light as an art form. The Light and Space movement had affiliation with art schools and industry, whereas the Tanners were very isolated from the art world in Miami at that time. Yet it provided them with freedom to develop their art form. Joseph H. Albers described this type of occurrence as "duplicity in events: what happens here as new, happens somewhere else just the same way."

Their new medium became acrylic glass, also known as plexiglass, an industrial material that they first began to use in sculptures when living in New York and that were commissioned by corporations including Air Products and Chemicals Inc., Raytheon Corporation, and General Electric in 1963 and 1964.

Intrigued by acrylic's light transmitting qualities and color, the Tanners made cubes and pedestals that were internally lighted at their studio in Miami. Their first exhibition of the new work was at Hi-Fi Associates in Miami in the spring of 1969 when high-end stereo components were being introduced to the public. The announcement referred to it as a "new direction in sound, new directions in environment, and a new direction in art."

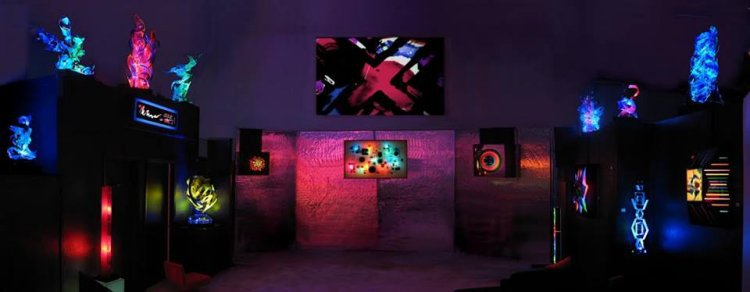
Lumonics Light & Sound Gallery, Denver, Colorado

== Lumonics (1969-2020) ==
The light sculptures became their main focus and collaboration. In 1969, they converted the studio into a theater, and acquired the technology (a color organ) that made it possible to synchronize the light sculptures with music. Slide projectors using their hand-painted slides, overhead projectors, strobe lights, and the color organ were their new artistic toolbox. Blow-up furniture, water beds, mylar (a reflective material) on the walls, and the light sculptures created a powerful setting. Lumia art was part of the projection as well as an element in several of the light sculptures. The three main elements of lumia, defined by light art pioneer, Thomas Wilfred (1889–1968), are "form, color, and motion in a dark space." The Tanners were not familiar with the Wilfred art work, yet began their lumia art in the time period when Wilfred died in 1968. Originally called Afterimage, the name Lumonics was originated by Dave Robbins in his review, 'Lumonics' A Completely New Art Form in the September 18, 1970 edition of the University of Miami student newspaper, The Hurricane. This was the beginning of the Lumonics Light and Sound Theatre, chronicled in the Michael Betancourt book. The Tanners and a team of helpers presented Lumonics in Miami (1969-1979), San Diego, California (1980-81), Bangor, Maine (1981-82), and Fort Lauderdale, FL (1988-2009). From 1986 to 1987, The Tanners mounted an exhibition at the Patricia Judith Gallery in Boca Raton, Florida, their first exhibition of their light sculptures outside of the Lumonics Theatre. A new wing at the Gallery was added to house their art works.

After Mel Tanner died in October, 1993, Dorothy collaborated with long-time team member Marc Billard on her light sculptures, video, and music to further the Lumonics expression. Tanner curated the exhibit, "The Art of Lumonics", at the Coral Springs Museum of Art, Coral Springs, Florida from March 4 to May 14, 2005 that featured both her work and that of her late husband, and the Tanner/Billard video art and music. Michael Mills, the art writer for New Times Broward-Palm Beach, wrote in the Museum introduction, "The exhibition is something of a departure for Lumonics in that it takes the art out of the gallery/studio/theater context and into a museum environment."

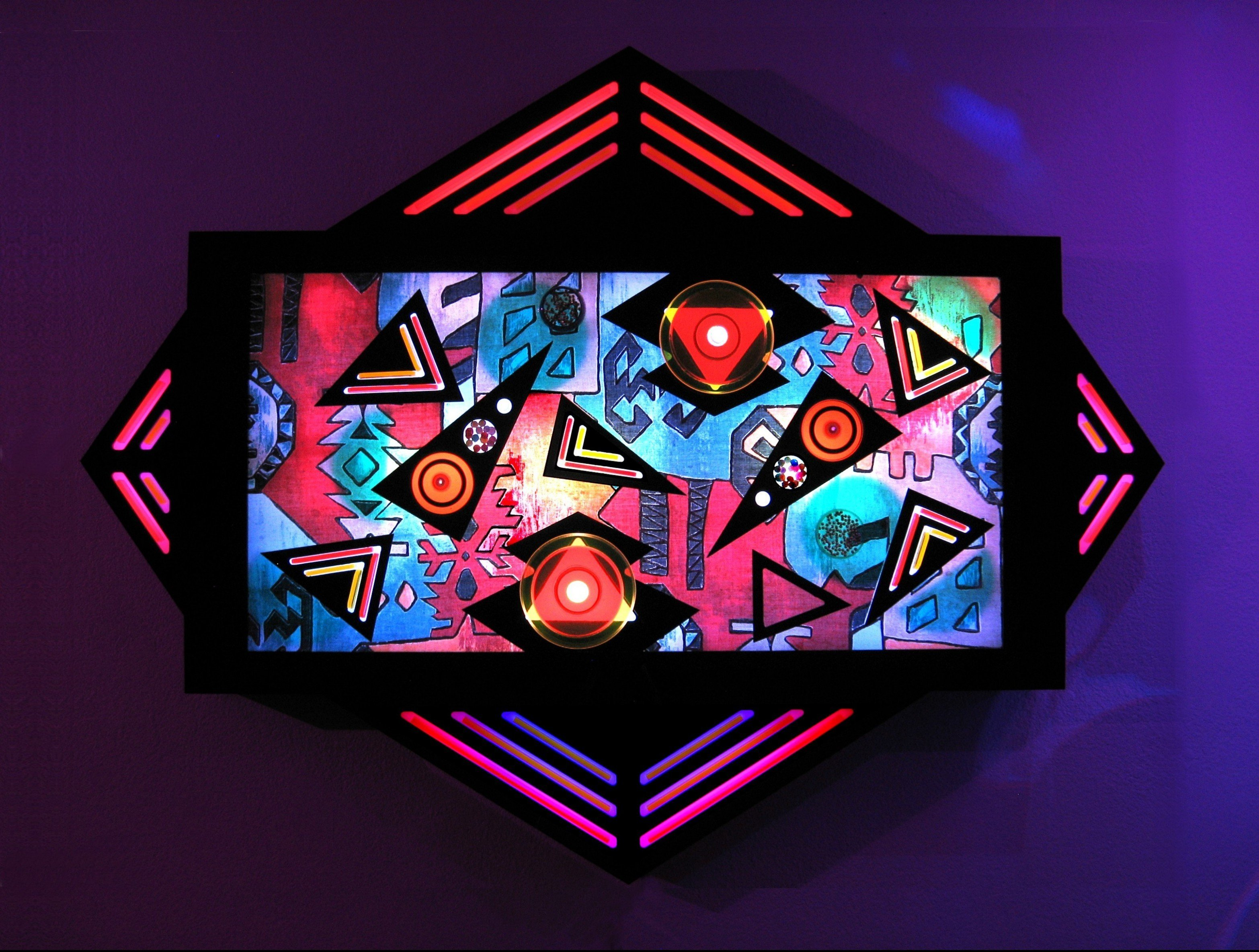
Enigma (2014) by Dorothy Tanner, Lumonics Mind Spa, 2018, McNichols Civic Center Building, Denver, CO

The team relocated from Florida to Denver in 2009 and developed Tanner Studio/Lumonics Light & Sound Gallery. Ms. Tanner had several art exhibits in Denver, including VERTIGO Art Space, the Museum of Outdoor Arts, the Gallery at the Denver International Airport (2014) and the Lakewood Cultural Center (2015). While her Creatures from Left Field exhibit was taking place at Lakewood, Tanner was one of three senior citizens, aged 82-102 and still active in the arts, interviewed by Ryan Warner on Colorado Matters, Colorado Public Radio. The title of the program was Staying Vital As Time Marches On: Art Can Hold The Key.

The Museum of Outdoor Arts presented Lumonics Then & Now: A Retrospective of Light-Based Sculpture by Dorothy & Mel Tanner from January 13 to March 24, 2017, and published a book about the exhibit and produced a documentary. On February 10, 2017, artist and art critic, Todd Siler, discussed the exhibit at the Denver Art Museum at the Exploring the Denver Art Scene Forum, and wrote a review for the Museum of Outdoor Arts web site, Luminous Art inspiring Our Hearts-n-Minds To Dream With Wonder: Experiencing the Art of Mel and Dorothy Tanner. Mr. Siler wrote that the Tanners and their art form brought to mind other "innovative artists exploring new media and aesthetic experiences" including James Turrell, Otto Peine(sic), and Gyorgy Kepes.

Ms. Tanner was invited by Denver Arts & Venues to create a site-specific art installation at the landmark McNichols Building in Civic Center Park in downtown Denver, beginning January 13, 2018. The exhibit, the Lumonics Mind Spa, was opened to the public through July 18, 2018. In August 2018, Tanner was nominated for the Arts & Culture Impact Award, presented to an individual or an organization that had made a significant and lasting impact on arts and culture in Denver. On Nov. 15, 2018, she received the Excellent in Arts & Culture Innovation Award from Denver Mayor Michael Hancock for "breaking new ground in the arts and whose contribution to innovation in the arts has been significant in 2018."

In 2018 the Lumonics School of Light Art was founded by Tanner in Denver and was co-directed by Tanner and Billard. The school teaches students how to construct and electrify a cube, which was the first lighted artwork that the Tanners constructed.

In 2020, Thornton Arts & Culture Center commissioned Tanner and Billard for an installation entitled Lumonics Mind Spa: Thornton. It featured the light art of Dorothy and Mel Tanner, and video art and music by Billard and Dorothy Tanner.

Dorothy Tanner died July 23, 2020 in Aurora, Colorado.

The second commission awarded to Tanner Studio since the passing of Dorothy Tanner was for the Lumonics Mind Spa: Light Intersection.

One of Mel Tanner's light sculptures, Multi-Directional, was selected by the Museum of Outdoor Arts for placement at Fiddler's Green Amphitheatre in Greenwood Village Colorado in August 2021. Another light sculpture, Postscript by Mel Tanner is now in the permanent art collection of Denver's Meow Wolf.

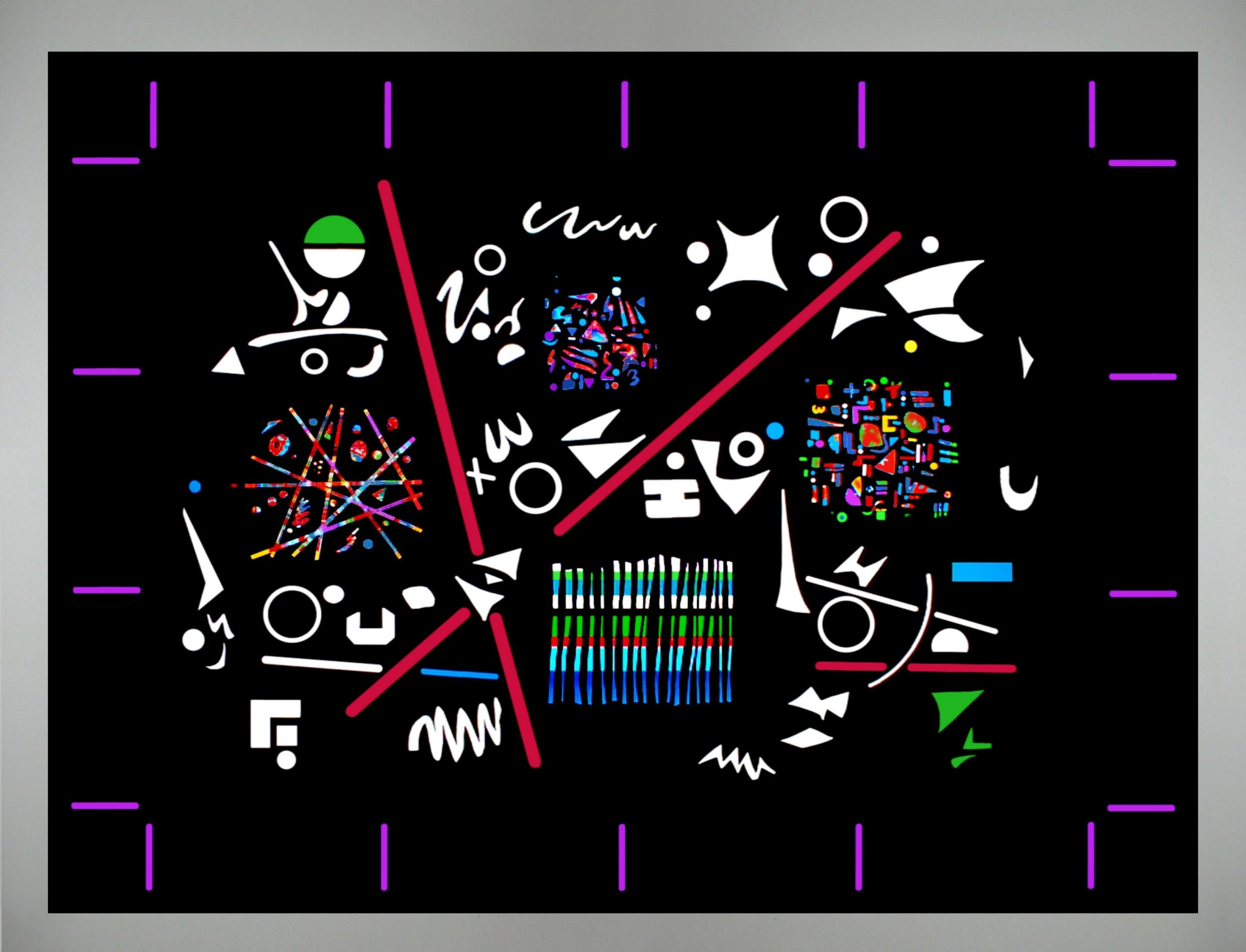
Transworld (1991) by Mel Tanner, Then and Now Tanner Retrospective, 2017, Museum of Outdoor Arts, Englewood, CO

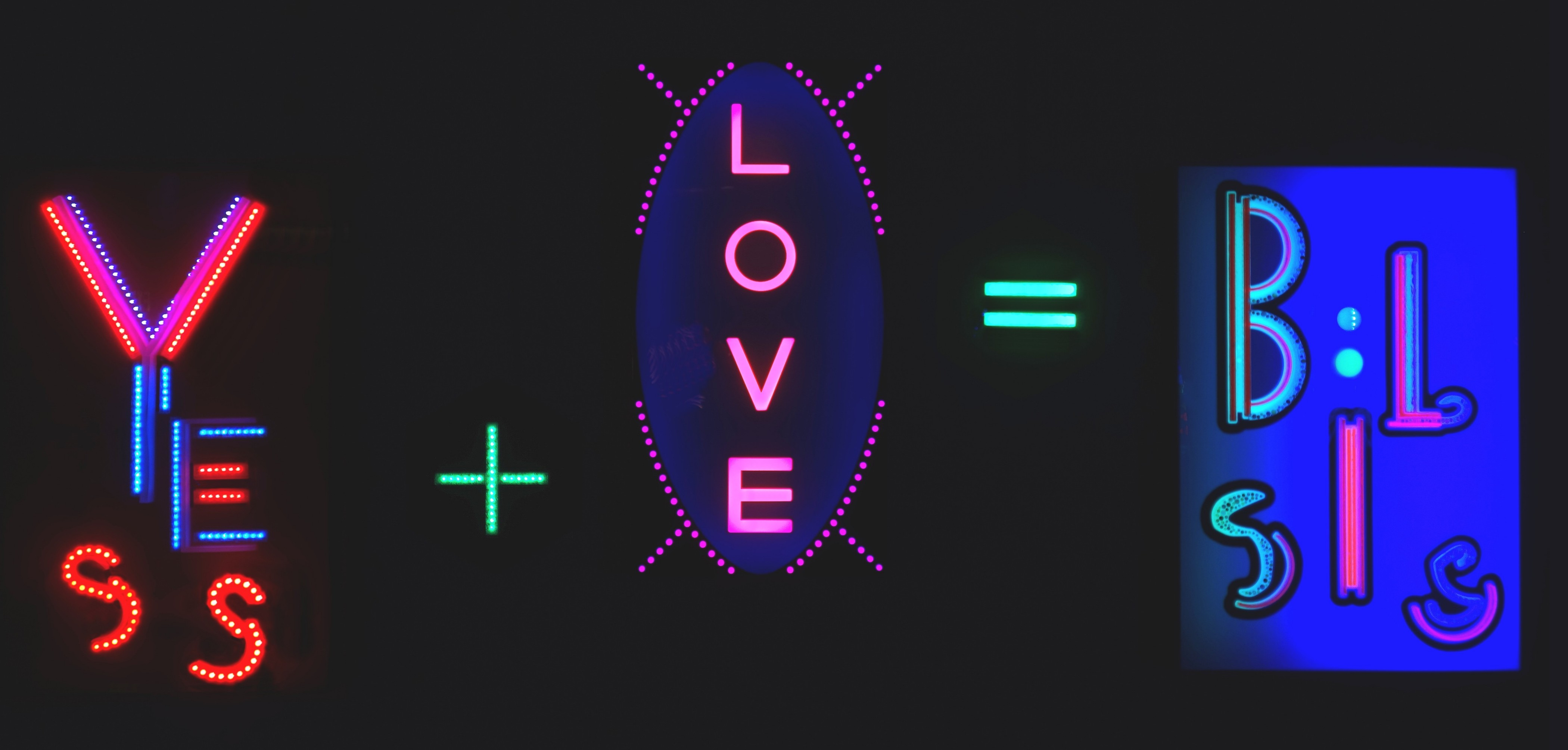
Yess + Love = Bliss (2017) by Dorothy Tanner, Lumonics Mind Spa, 2018, McNichols Civic Center Building, Denver, CO

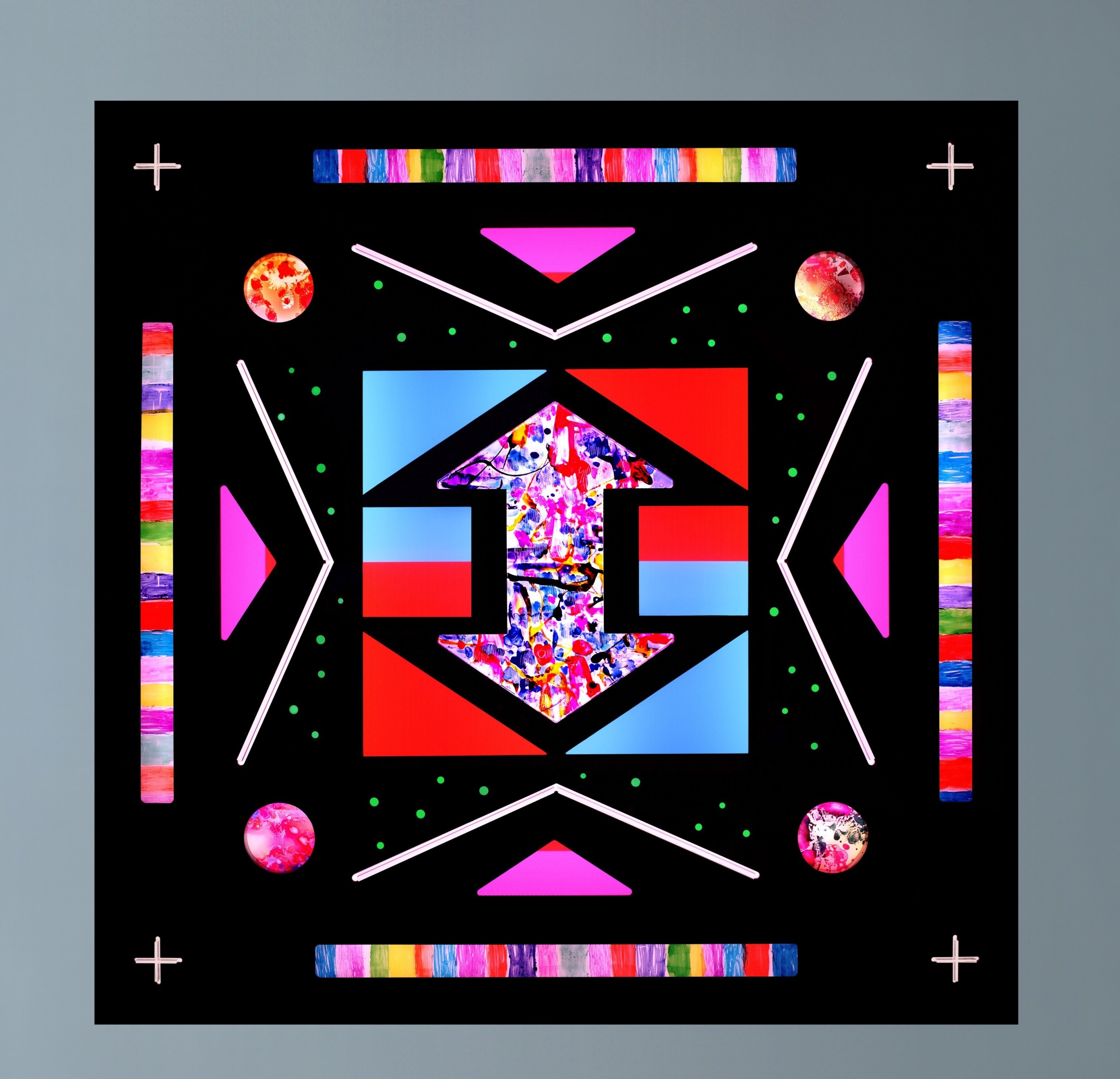
Directional by Mel Tanner (1987), Lumonics Light & Sound Gallery, Denver, CO

== Select exhibitions and installations ==
- The Boathouse, Steamboat Springs, CO, Dec. 6, 2024 - Jan 5, 2025
- Frederic C. Hamilton Family Gallery at Children's Hospital Colorado - Luminaries - Aurora, CO Nov. 9, 2021- Jan. 20, 2022
- Gallery at Meow Wolf Denver's Convergence Station, Denver, CO Sept. 17, 2021-Feb 28, 2022
- Light sculpture installation at Fiddler's Green Amphitheatre, Greenwood Village, CO August, 2021
- Understudy Gallery, Lumonics Mind Spa: Light Intersection, Denver, CO Nov. 27, 2020-Jan 30, 2021
- Thornton Arts & Culture Center, Lumonics Mind Spa: Thornton, Thornton, CO June 2, 2020-Sept. 26, 2020
- The Storefront, Denver, CO, From the Beginning - A Lumonics Light Art Installation, Nov. through Dec. 2019, includes early light art by the Tanners and art works from students created at the Lumonics School of Light Art
- Gilpin Arts, Central City, CO, Sept. 2019 - June 2020
- Light sculpture installation on Eureka Street in Central City, CO commissioned by the Gilpin County Arts Association, June- August, 2019
- Museum of Outdoor Arts - Paintings Sculptures & Snapshots: 37 Years of Acquisitions From the MOA Collection (group show), Englewood, CO, May 8- August 3, 2018
- McNichols Civic Center Building - Lumonics Mind Spa, Denver, CO, Jan. 13 - July 15, 2018
- Museum of Outdoor Arts - Then and Now: A Retrospective of Light-Based Sculpture by Dorothy and Mel Tanner, Englewood, CO, 2017
- Museum of Outdoor Arts - Reinventing the Image (group show), Englewood, CO 2016
- Lakewood Cultural Center - Creatures From Left Field - Lakewood, CO, June 4–30, 2015
- Art Gallery at Denver International Airport, A Light Journey, Denver, CO, 2014
- Museum of Outdoor Arts, Light Supply (group show), Englewood, CO, June 25, 2011 – February 25, 2012
- Gallery 910, Best of Santa Fe Art District Show (group show) Denver, CO, 2010- 2011
- VERTIGO Art Space, The Light Fantastic, Denver, CO, 2010
- Union Station Fund Raising Event, Denver, CO, 200918th Annual Loveland Sculpture Invitational, Loveland, CO, 2009
- Edge Zones Art Center, Wynwood Art District, Miami FL, 2007- 2008
- Coral Springs Museum of Art ,The Art of Lumonics, Coral Springs, FL, 2006
- Museum of New Arts, Fort Lauderdale (group show), Fort Lauderdale, FL, 1989
- Patricia Judith Gallery, Boca Raton, Florida, 1986
- Hi-Fi Associates, Miami, Florida, 1969
- Loeb Center at New York University, The New Face in Art (group show), New York, NY, 1964
- Key Gallery, D. Tanner, New Sculpture, New York, NY, 1962
- Key Gallery, Mel Tanner, New York, NY, 1962

== Special projects ==
- Lumonics Gallery, Black Hawk, CO, Sept. 2019 - Feb, 2020
- Lumonics Light & Sound Gallery, Denver, CO, 2008–present
- Lumonics Mind Spa at The Scarlet, Central City, CO, 2016–17
- Lumonics Light and Sound Theatre, Ft. Lauderdale, FL, 1987-2009
- Lumonics Performing Art Gallery, Bangor, ME,1980–81
- Lumonics, San Diego, California, 1979–80
- Lumonics Light and Sound Theatre, Miami, Florida, 1969–79

== Additional projects ==
- Zikr Dance Ensemble - Lady of the Lake - 2015
- WGBH-TV - Sets for Frontline and Nova - Boston, MA - 1983
- WBZ-TV - World map - Boston, MA - 1983

== Select commissions ==
- Sheraton Hotel, LaGuardia Airport, New York,1978
- Hilton Hotels, Florida and Grand Bahamas, 1978
- Continental Can, New York, NY, 1965
- General Electric, New York, NY, 1964
- Raytheon Corporation, New York, NY, 1964
- Air Products and Chemicals, Inc., Allentown, Pennsylvania, 1964
- Datamore, Inc., New York, NY,1963
- Data Processing, Inc., Rochester, NY, 1962

== Public television and radio interviews ==
- Rocky Mountain PBS Arts District
- South Florida PBS Broward Closeup
- Rocky Mountain PBS Arts District
- Denver 8, Municipal access television station for the City and County of Denver, Colorado, Denver ArtScene
- Colorado Public Radio

== Grants ==
- Museum of Outdoor Arts
- "Ecology Through Art" video production, Comprehensive Employment and Training Act (CETA)
- Meow Wolf

== Mayor's Award, City and County of Denver ==
- 2018 Denver Mayor’s Award for Excellence in Arts & Culture Innovation Award: Dorothy Tanner produced by Denver Arts & Venues

== Lumonics School of Light Art ==
- The Lumonics School of Light Art was founded by Dorothy Tanner in October, 2018
- Awarded BEST LIGHT ART INSTRUCTION by Denver Westword (2019 Best of Denver Awards)
