= Mary Hallock-Greenewalt =

Inventor and pianist (1871–1950)

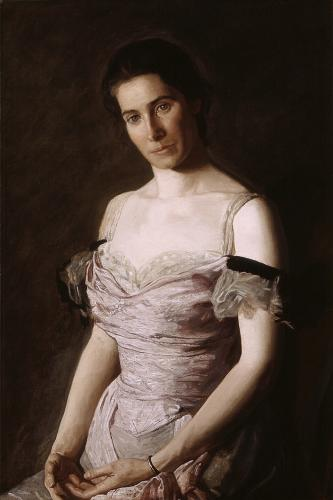
- Portrait of Greenewalt by Thomas Eakins

Background information
- Born: September 8, 1871
- Origin: United States
- Died: November 27, 1950 (aged 79)
- Occupation(s): Inventor and Pianist

Mary Elizabeth Hallock-Greenewalt (September 8, 1871 – November 27, 1950) was an inventor and pianist who performed with the Philadelphia and Pittsburgh symphonies as a soloist. She is best known for her invention of a type of visual music she called Nourathar.

Thomas Eakins painted her portrait in 1903, currently in the Roland P. Murdock Collection of the Wichita Museum of Art.

== Biography ==
Mary Hallock was born in 1871 in Beirut, then in Syria Vilayet, Ottoman Empire, to Samuel Hallock and Sara Tabet. After her mother began exhibiting symptoms of mental illness, eleven-year-old Mary Hallock and her siblings were sent to live with friends and relatives in the US, where she spent the remainder of her youth in the Philadelphia area. As a young adult she studied piano at the Philadelphia Conservatory of Music and then with Theodor Leschetizky in Vienna. After her return to Philadelphia Mary Hallock married Frank L. Greenewalt, a physician. The couple had one son, Crawford Hallock Greenewalt, a chemical engineer who eventually served as president of the DuPont Company. In her later years Hallock-Greenewalt resided in Wilmington, Delaware. She died in Philadelphia at the age of 79.

== Recordings ==
Columbia Records released her performance of Chopin's "Preludes in E Minor, C minor, A Major" and "Nocturne in G Major" in March, 1920 (A6136).

== Inventions ==
=== 'Color organ' ===
The name for her art, Nourathar, was adapted from the Arabic words for light (nour), and essence of (athar). Unlike earlier inventors of color-music such as the painter A. Wallace Rimington, Hallock-Greenewalt did not produce a strict definition of correspondence between specific colors and particular notes, instead arguing that these relationships were inherently variable and reflected the temperament and ability of the performer.

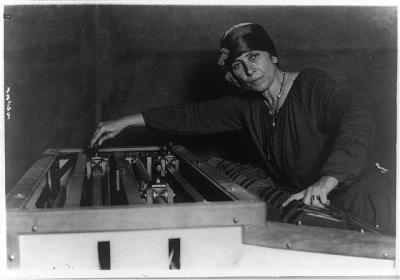
Hallock Greenewalt, half-length portrait, at electric light "color organ", which she invented

Her earliest attempts at creating this art entailed her construction of an automated machine where colored lights were synchronized to records. This produced an unsatisfactory result, leading to her development of an instrument that could actually be played live.

Her color organ, which she named "Sarabet" after her mother, required her to invent a number of new technologies. She received nine patents from the US Patent office for them. Among these devices was a non-linear variety of rheostat, a patent that was infringed by General Electric and other companies. She sued them for infringement and won in 1934. The Sarabet went through a series of refinements between 1916 and 1934. In 1946 she published a book on her invented art of "light-color playing" called Nourathar: The Fine Art of Light-Color Playing.

=== Hand-painted films ===
Michael Betancourt has noted Hallock-Greenewalt also produced the earliest hand-painted films known to still exist. However, these were not movies but films produced specifically to be performed by her earliest version of the Sarabet which was a machine for automatic accompaniment to records. Its construction, where a single viewer looked down into the machine at the film itself, resembled Edison's kinetoscope. This device was an early music visualizer of the type now included with computer audio-players. Even though these films were not designed to be motion pictures, they were produced with templates and aerosol sprays, producing repeating geometric patterns in the same way as the hand painted films of Len Lye from the 1930s.

== See also ==
- Clavier à lumières
- Louis Bertrand Castel
- New Epoch Notation Painting
- Thomas Wilfred
- Oskar Fischinger
- William Moritz

== External sources ==
- Klein, Adrian Bernard (1937). Coloured Light: An Art Medium (3rd ed.). London, UK: The Technical Press. OCLC 888824867.
- Rimington, Alexander Wallace (1912). Colour-Music: The Art Of Mobile Colour. London, UK: Hutchinson & Co. hdl:2027/njp.32101073304402. OCLC 685182874.
- Elder, R. Bruce (2008). Harmony and Dissent: Film and Avant-garde Art Movements in the Early Twentieth Century. Waterloo, ON, CAN: Wilfrid Laurier University Press. ISBN 9781554580286. OCLC 607647995.
- The Mary Elizabeth Hallock Greenewalt papers, including correspondence, photos, drawings and artifacts, are available for research use at the Historical Society of Pennsylvania.
