= Willie Williams (set designer) =

British stage and lighting designer

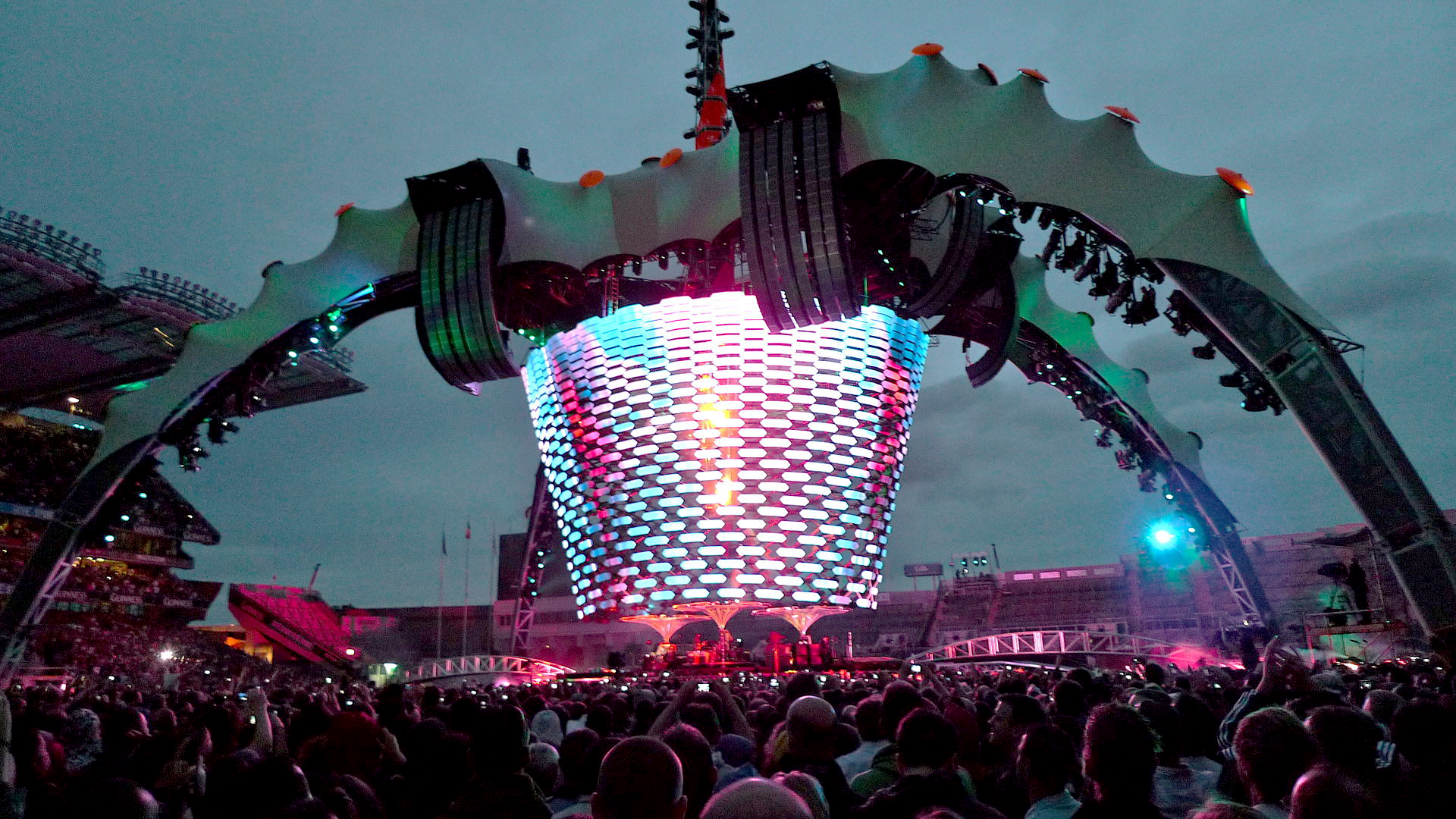
Show design, U2 360° Tour, 2009

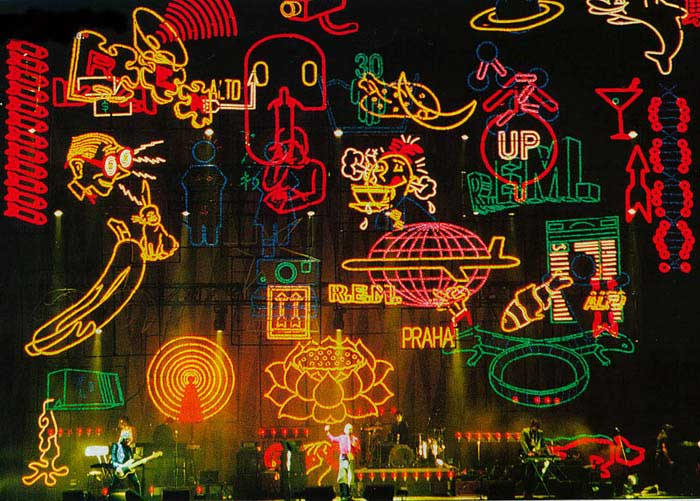
Show design, R.E.M., Up Tour, 1999

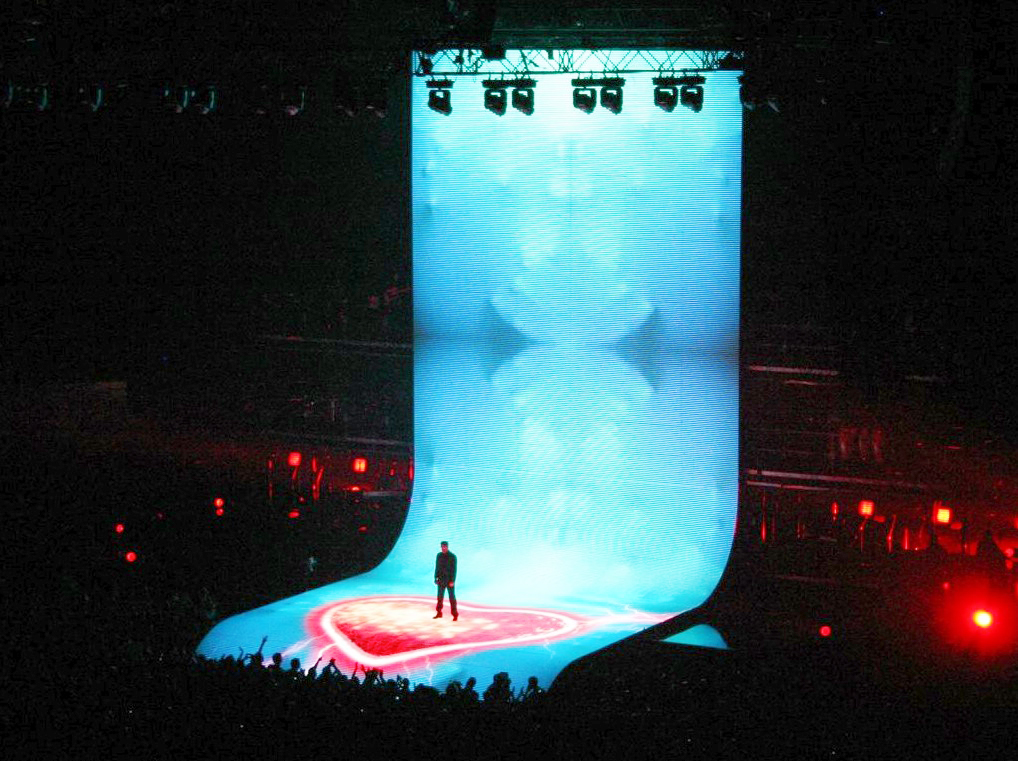
Show design, George Michael, 25 Live Tour, 2006

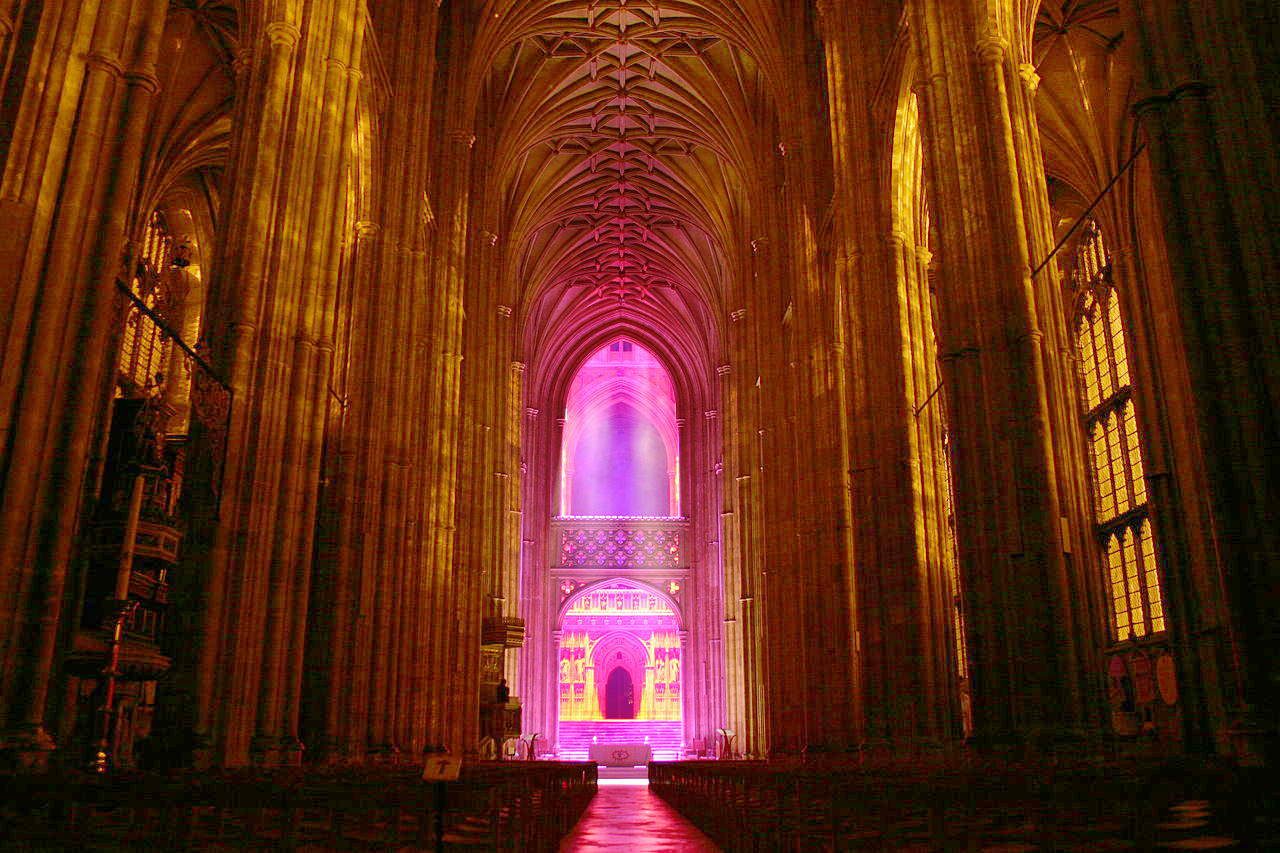
'Vigil' installation, Canterbury Cathedral, 2006

William Peter Charles Williams (born 1959) is an English show director, stage and lighting designer and video director for concerts, theatre and multimedia projects. He is best known for his work with the rock band U2, and is recognised as one of the leading artists in this field. William Gibson, writing in Wired magazine, said "Willie Williams combines a passionate delight in technology with an infectious low-tech joy. His innovations have become industry standards."

== Early life ==
He was born in 1959 in Newcastle-upon-Tyne and raised on Ecclesall Road, Sheffield, the son of Robert Woodman Williams, a singer and medical practitioner who sang with South Yorkshire Opera. Williams excelled at mathematics and science in school and planned to study physics at University College London. Punk rock encouraged him to enter the music industry instead: he began doing lights for various bands such as Deaf School and Stiff Little Fingers.

== Career ==
=== U2 ===
Williams has been responsible for the design of U2's tours from 1983 onward, most famously the Zoo TV Tour (1992–1993), and most recently U2:UV Achtung Baby Live at Sphere (2023–2024). The residency, which opened the Sphere, was met with universal acclaim, with The Daily Telegraph stating that U2 and Williams had "changed live entertainment forever".

=== Various artists ===
He has also worked with musical artists such as Mumford and Sons, Sigur Ros, Lady Gaga, R.E.M., David Bowie, The Rolling Stones, Robbie Williams, Darren Hayes, George Michael and Self Esteem.

Williams has designed for the Montreal-based dance company La La La Human Steps. Other collaborations have been with Laurie Anderson, Marianne Faithfull and the Kronos Quartet, most notably on Sun Rings, a joint effort with NASA that combines the string quartet's music with video and audio material collected by the Voyager 1 and Voyager 2 spacecraft.

=== Gallery and architectural installations ===
In 2015, Williams designed the giant kinetic chandelier installed at Omnia nightclub at Caesars Palace in Las Vegas. He has exhibited his own kinetic light sculptures in several art galleries. The sculptures, entitled "Lumia Domestica", create kaleidoscopic projections in the tradition of Nicolas Schöffer and Thomas Wilfred by refracting light through household glassware. Other public works include the creation of lighting installations at London's Southbank Centre and within Canterbury Cathedral; "SkyChurch", a multimedia performance space at the Experience Music Project in Seattle, Washington, and a permanent exhibit at Cleveland's Rock and Roll Hall of Fame Museum.

=== Theatre works ===
Theatre shows Williams has worked on include Inter Alia, starring Rosamund Pike at the Lyttelton Theatre at the National Theatre, London, Prima Facie, starring Jodie Comer, at the Harold Pinter Theatre, London and John Golden Theatre on Broadway, for which he won a New York Drama Desk Award; We Will Rock You, Little Britain Live, French and Saunders Still Alive, Steve Coogan is Alan Partridge and Other Less Successful Characters, The Fast Show Live, Barbarella and Pam Ann.

== Awards ==
- 1987: Lighting Director of the Year, Performance Magazine, United States
- 1992: Lighting Designer of the Year, Performance Magazine, United States
- 1992: Lighting Designer of the Year, Lighting Dimensions International, United States
- 2000: Top 25 Visionaries in Entertainment, Wired Magazine, United States
- 2001: Eddy Award for Excellence in Design, New York
- 2002: Lighting Designer of the Year, Live Magazine Awards, London
- 2003: Lighting Designer of the Year, Total Production Awards, London
- 2006: Lighting Designer of the Year, Total Production Awards, London
- 2006; Metropolitan Home, Design 100
- 2007: Best in Book, Creative Review Annual (George Michael, 25 Live Tour)
- 2008: Excellence in Design Award (George Michael, 25 Live Tour), Live Design, New York
- 2009: Redden Award for Excellence in Design, United States
- 2010: Live Production of the Year (U2 360° Tour), Lighting Designer of the Year and Video Visionary, Total Production Awards, London
- 2016: Most Creative Stage Production (U2, Innocence + Experience Tour), Pollstar Concert Industry Awards
- 2019: Honorary Fellowship, Rose Bruford College of Theatre & Performance
- 2023: New York Drama Desk Award, Outstanding Lighting Design of a Play (Prima Facie). Shared with Natasha Chivers.
- 2024: Honorary Doctorate (Dr. of Arts), Sheffield Hallam University
- 2025: Honorary Professorship, Sheffield Hallam University
- 2025: Webby Awards, AI, Immersive & Games, Best Performance 2025, Treatment Studio
