= Visual music =

Representation of music in film or other art forms

Lichtspiel: Opus I (1921) by Walter Ruttmann

Visual music, sometimes called color music, refers to the creation of a visual analogue to musical form by adapting musical structures for visual composition, which can also include silent films or silent Lumia work. It also refers to methods or devices which can translate sounds or music into a related visual presentation. An expanded definition may include the translation of music to painting; this was the original definition of the term, as coined by Roger Fry in 1912 to describe the work of Wassily Kandinsky. There are a variety of definitions of visual music, particularly as the field continues to expand. In some recent writing, usually in the fine art world, visual music is often conflated with or defined as synaesthesia, though historically this has never been a definition of visual music. Visual music has also been defined as a form of intermedia.

Visual music also refers to systems which convert music or sound directly into visual forms, such as film, video, computer graphics, installations or performances by means of a mechanical instrument, an artist's interpretation, or a computer. The reverse is applicable also, literally converting images to sound by drawn objects and figures on a film's soundtrack, in a technique known as drawn or graphical sound. Famous visual music artists include Mary Ellen Bute, Jordan Belson, Oskar Fischinger, Norman McLaren, John Whitney Sr., and Thomas Wilfred, plus a number of contemporary artists.

== Instruments ==
The history of this tradition includes many experiments with color organs. Artist or inventors "built instruments, usually called 'color organs,' that would display modulated colored light in some kind of fluid fashion comparable to music". For example, the Farblichtspiele ('colored-light-plays') of former Bauhaus student Ludwig Hirschfeld Mack. Several different definitions of color music exist; one is that color music is generally formless projections of colored light. Some scholars and writers have used the term color music interchangeably with visual music.

The construction of instruments to perform visual music live, as with sonic music, has been a continuous concern of this art. Color organs, while related, form an earlier tradition extending as early as the eighteenth century with the Jesuit Louis Bertrand Castel building an ocular harpsichord in the 1730s (visited by Georg Philipp Telemann, who composed for it). Other prominent color organ artist-inventors include: Alexander Wallace Rimington, Bainbridge Bishop, Thomas Wilfred, Charles Dockum, Mary Hallock-Greenewalt and Kurt Laurenz Theinert.

== On film ==
Visual music and abstract film or video often coincide. Some of the earliest known films of these two genres were hand-painted works produced by the Futurists Bruno Corra and Arnaldo Ginna between 1911 and 1912 (as they report in the Futurist Manifesto of Cinema), which are now lost. Mary Hallock-Greenewalt produced several reels of hand-painted films (although not traditional motion pictures) that are held by the Historical Society of Philadelphia. Like the Futurist films, and many other visual music films, her 'films' were meant to be a visualization of musical form.

Notable visual music filmmakers include: Walter Ruttmann, Hans Richter, Viking Eggeling, Oskar Fischinger, Len Lye, Mary Ellen Bute, Jordan Belson, Norman McLaren, Harry Smith, Hy Hirsh, John, James Whitney, Steven Woloshen, Richard Reeves and many others up to present day.

== Computer graphics ==
Oscilloscope showing a single pitch, a sine wave

The cathode ray tube made possible the oscilloscope, an early electronic device for studying electronic signals. It can produce images from sound by repeatedly sweeping out the shape of a signal over a length of time. This allows for intuitive visualization of sounds recorded from microphones.

Instead of graphing the sound pressure over time, one can graph the left against the right stereo channel instead. This would produce, for example, a circle, when a sine wave is generated for the left ear and a cosine wave for the right. By taking a Fourier transform of a vector image, a signal can be generated for the left and right ears that can reproduce the shape on an oscilloscope screen. Using these image signals to make music is a concept known as Oscilloscope Music.

The modern Laser lighting display displays wave patterns produced by similar circuitry to the oscilloscope. Modern DAWs and audio editing software also use graphical representations of sound reminiscent of the way an oscilloscope plots audio signals. Much of the UI in these software is skeuomorphic—using the knobs and dials of original equipment like the oscilloscope in the visual language of the interface.

The Animusic company (originally called 'Visual Music') has repeatedly demonstrated the use of computers to convert music — principally pop-rock based and composed as MIDI events — to animations. Graphic artist-designed virtual instruments which either play themselves or are played by virtual objects are all, along with the sounds, controlled by MIDI instructions.

In the image-to-sound sphere, MetaSynth includes a feature which converts images to sounds. The tool uses drawn or imported bitmap images, which can be manipulated with graphic tools, to generate new sounds or process existing audio. A reverse function allows the creation of images from sounds.

== Virtual reality ==
With the increasing popularity of head mounted displays for virtual reality there is an emerging new platform for visual music. While some developers have been focused on the impact of virtual reality on live music or on the possibilities for music videos, virtual reality is also an emerging field for music visualization and visual music.

== Graphic notation ==
Many composers have applied graphic notation to write compositions. Pioneering examples are the graphical scores of John Cage and Morton Feldman. Also known is the graphical score of György Ligeti's Artikulation designed by Rainer Wehinger, and Sylvano Bussotti.

In Italy, visual music practices developed within experimental music and graphic score traditions, particularly in Florence from the post-war period onward.

Musical theorists such as Harry Partch, Erv Wilson, Ivor Darreg, Glenn Branca, and Yuri Landman applied geometry in detailed visual musical diagrams explaining microtonal structures and musical scales.

== See also ==
=== Science ===
- Chromesthesia
- Cymatics
- Synesthesia in art

=== Industry ===
- VJing - The art of performing visual music
- Motion graphics - a process or technique often used in contemporary visual music
- Video synthesizer
- Visual album

=== Similar types of art ===
- Abstract film or Experimental film or Video art
- Audiovisual art
- Sound art or Sound sculpture or Sound installation
