= Motion Painting No. 1 =

1947 animated film by Oskar Fischinger

Motion Painting No. 1 is a 1947 independent short animated film in which film artist Oskar Fischinger put images in motion to the music of Johann Sebastian Bach's Brandenburg Concerto no. 3, BWV 1048.

== Production ==
The film was created by applying oil paint on Plexiglas. Fischinger filmed each brushstroke over the course of 9 months.

== Legacy ==
In 1997, the film was selected for preservation in the United States National Film Registry by the Library of Congress as being "culturally, historically, or aesthetically significant". The Academy Film Archive preserved Motion Painting No. 1 in 2000, though they do not have distribution rights.
