= Lumia art =

Form of art that uses light

Lumia is a form of art that uses light; originally associated with music but was later associated with painting. The term was coined by a twentieth-century artist, Thomas Wilfred. In the early twentieth century, artists began to promote colors and light together in their works. Wilfred worked towards establishing lumia as a new form of art, but the medium has yet to achieve popular recognition.

== Thomas Wilfred ==
Thomas Wilfred (1889–1968) was the first artist in the United States to use light as the sole means of expression for his artwork. He consistently used colored light in his works. Wilfred was born in Denmark in 1889 and immigrated to the U.S. in 1916. Wilfred explored light and color in art as early as 1905. In 1921, Wilfred created his first portable clavilux, a machine that allowed for the creation and performance of lumia. Clavilux is a term in Latin that means "light played by key". In 1930 Wilfred founded a center for research in lumia, the Art Institute of Light. The institute closed down during World War II. In the early 1930s, he shifted from accompanying musical performances to using the light organ in galleries and painting exhibitions. Wilfred planned to turn lumia into a formal art form, an "eighth art"; Wilfred wanted lumia to be its own art form of expression.

== Lumia ==
The three main elements of lumia, defined by Wilfred, are form, color, and motion in a dark space. The most important are said to be form and motion. Wilfred's original contribution to lumia was the introduction of a fourth dimension - time. Since 1924, lumia accompanied music, dance, and drama.

=== Musical aspects ===
In a musical sense, lumia is used to accompany music by adding a visual effect. Wilfred mentioned that Lumia has three factors, "Form, color, and motion are the three basic factors in lumia - as in all visual experience - and form and motion are the two most important."

==== Clavilux ====
A term also coined by Thomas Wilfred to refer to his invention that allowed the creation and performance of lumia. Clavilux means "light played by key" in Latin. A term used by other artists was color organ.

==== Light organ ====
Louis-Bertrand Castel invented the first light organ in the seventeenth century. For more information check light organ or color organ.

=== Painting aspects ===
There are different forms of art that use light as a medium:

==== Light art ====
Light art is an art form that focuses on the expression of light. Light art includes stained glass which transmits light through colored glass. This type of art dates back to the 4th century. This art is found in churches and mosques with stained glass windows. Another used of light art is shadow puppetry in which shadows can create moving images. This art can be dated back to 380 BC by the use of Plato in his allegory of the cave. Light art is even used in modern photography and motion pictures which uses artificial light to help captures images. Artists recognized for their use of light include James Turrell, Robert Irwin, Dan Flavin, Grimanesa Amorós, Bruce Nauman, Jenny Holzer, Leo Villareal, Mel and Dorothy Tanner, and George Stadnik.

==== Light painting ====
Light painting is a term used for a photographic technique. It is done by moving a light source or the camera while taking a long exposure photograph to produce a light painting. This creates a photograph that looks like it was painted with light. Painting with a light source dates back to 1889.

== See also ==
- Laser lighting display
- Ivan Dryer, founder of Laserium
