= Oscilloscope Music =

Oscilloscope Music is an art-form where music is constructed from audio signals which produce animations when viewed with an oscilloscope. The oscilloscope is turned to X-Y mode and patterns are drawn onscreen by moving the electron beam with the left and right channels independently. This is related to other types of music visualization like video synthesizers, but is notably differentiated as the music is created specifically to be visualized.

== Background - Function of an Oscilloscope ==
The oscilloscope was designed for studying electronic signals. Its central component is the cathode ray tube, which fires a constant stream of electrons at a glass display panel coated in phosphors. Wherever the beam strikes, the phosphors glow for a short period afterwards.

The electron beam can be deflected horizontally and vertically by changing the magnetic field around the CRT. A stationary magnetic field traversed by a moving charged particle causes a deflection according to the Lorentz force, and so the electron changes direction to hit a different part of the display. We control the magnetic field via current through electromagnetic coils.

=== Visualizing Signals ===
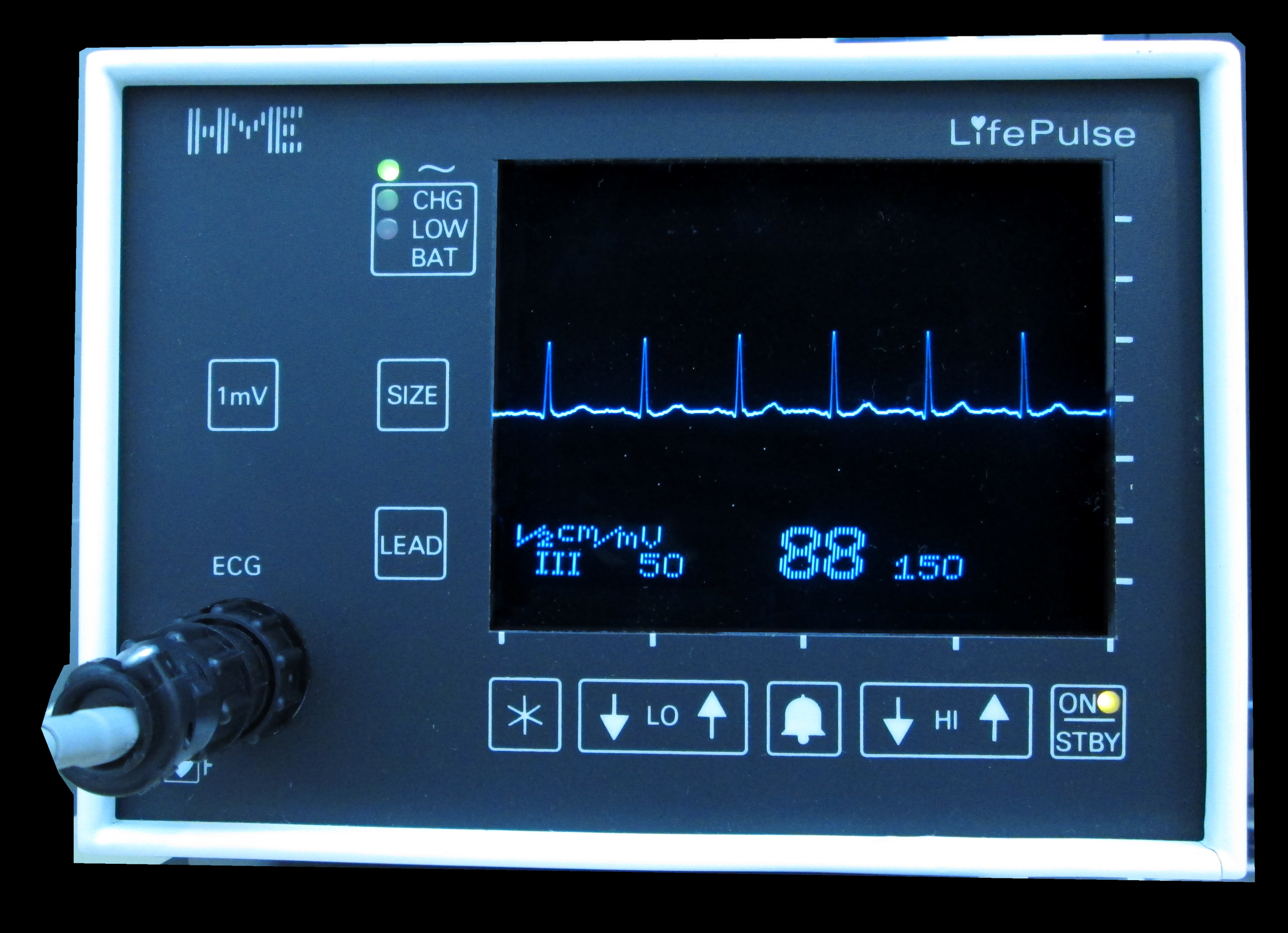
Example of an electrocardiogram using a display based on an oscilloscope with a slow horizontal sweep

In typical use, the beam of an oscilloscope sweeps horizontally while plotting the value of the signal vertically. When the horizontal sweep is very slow, we see slow changes and infrequent features—like the pulse of heartbeat. With a very high sweep, we can visualize the periodic signals of AC electricity, or musical tones.

For example. If an oscilloscope sweeps 440 times per second and we play a musical A note of 440 Hz, we will see a stationary wave representing the shape of a single waveform. The beam resets to the left side of the screen at the same frequency as the audio signal, so the beam traces the same path for each wave length.

If we play a perfect sine wave, we see a sine wave and hear a pure musical tone. If we play an instrument such as a flute or violin, then we still see the same fundamental wave on the oscilloscope, but with higher tones superimposed on the wave, changing the timbre.

The vertical position of the dot on the screen changes directly with the signal, we just change how fast is sweeps sideways across the screen to capture large events, or view the change in the waveform in the present moment.

=== X-Y mode ===
An oscilloscope can be changed into X-Y mode to change the position of the beam based on two signals instead of just one. Now one signal controls the vertical position, while the other controls the horizontal position.

If both axes are fed the same signal, then a straight line is produced on screen; the dot moves along the line of Y=X. Thus it is not very interesting to apply this mode to mono audio recordings.

If we take the left and right stereo channels of the input as the signals controlling the beam, we get more variety. For example, the same sine wave can be played over both signals, while one channel is delayed by 90 degrees. This produces a circle. More complex combinations of signals produce more complicated shapes. A Fourier transform of a line drawing can be taken to produce parametric signals. Playing these repeating signals through the stereo channels into an oscilloscope produces an approximation of the original image.

There are many ways of producing the signals used in oscilloscope music, but results all use the same concept to display the animations.

== Expanding on the concept ==
Playing two sine waves of frequencies which have a harmonic relationship create a Lissajous curve. If the relationship between the X and Y channels is slightly off from a harmonic then the curve will process—appearing to rotate in place.

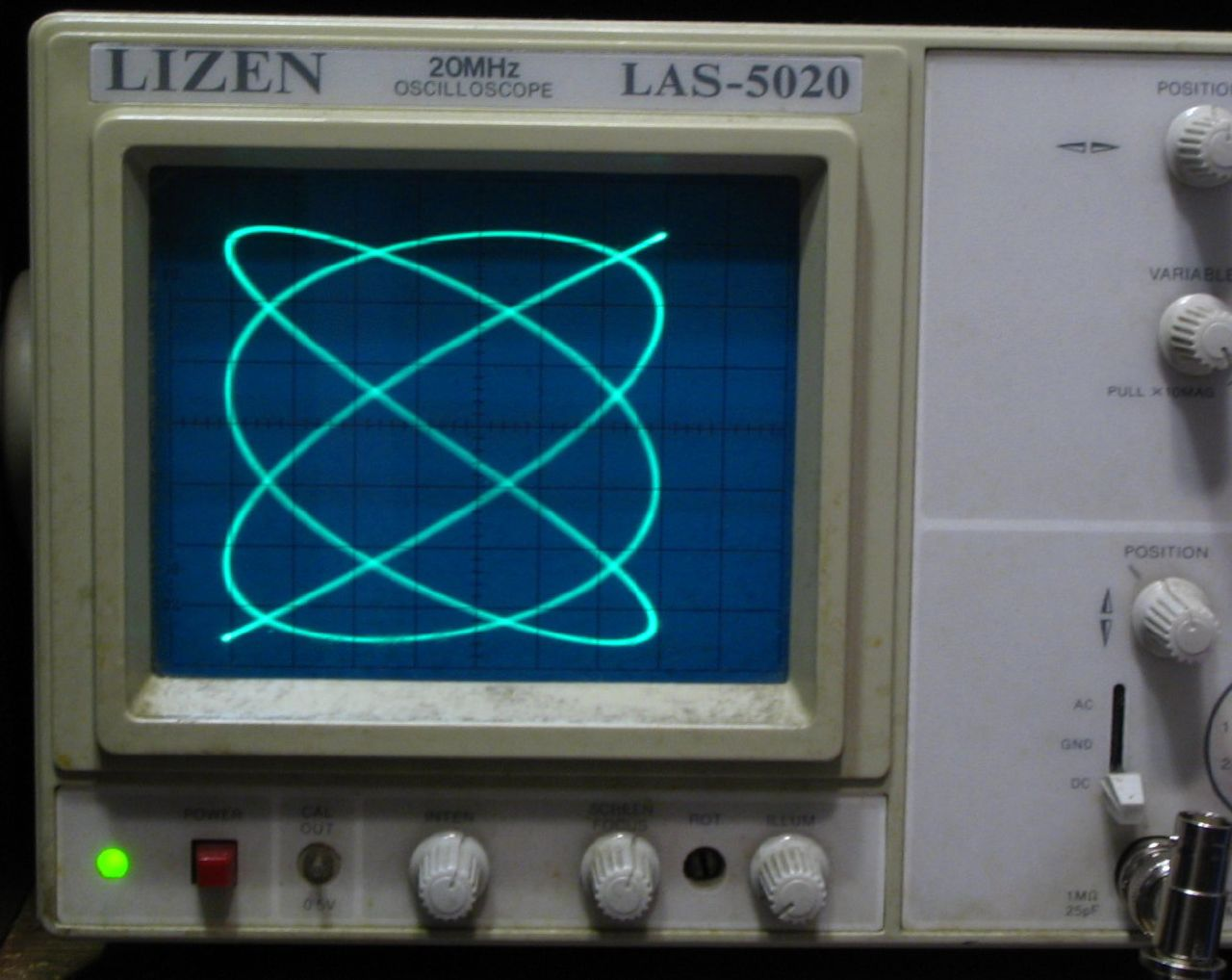
A Lissajous figure produced on an oscilloscope

== Community ==
There has been a surge in oscilloscope music in recent years, with channels popping up dedicated to the art-form on YouTube and TikTok. A subreddit dedicated to this craft was created in 2016, and examples are discussed and shared in forums.

=== Examples ===
- "Oscilloscope Music - Page 1". eevblog.com. Archived from the original on 2026-04-11.
- Smarter Every Day - Drawing With Sound
- A Beginner's Guide to Oscilloscope Music: Linear Algebra
