= Thomas Wilfred =

Danish visual artist and musician (1889–1968)

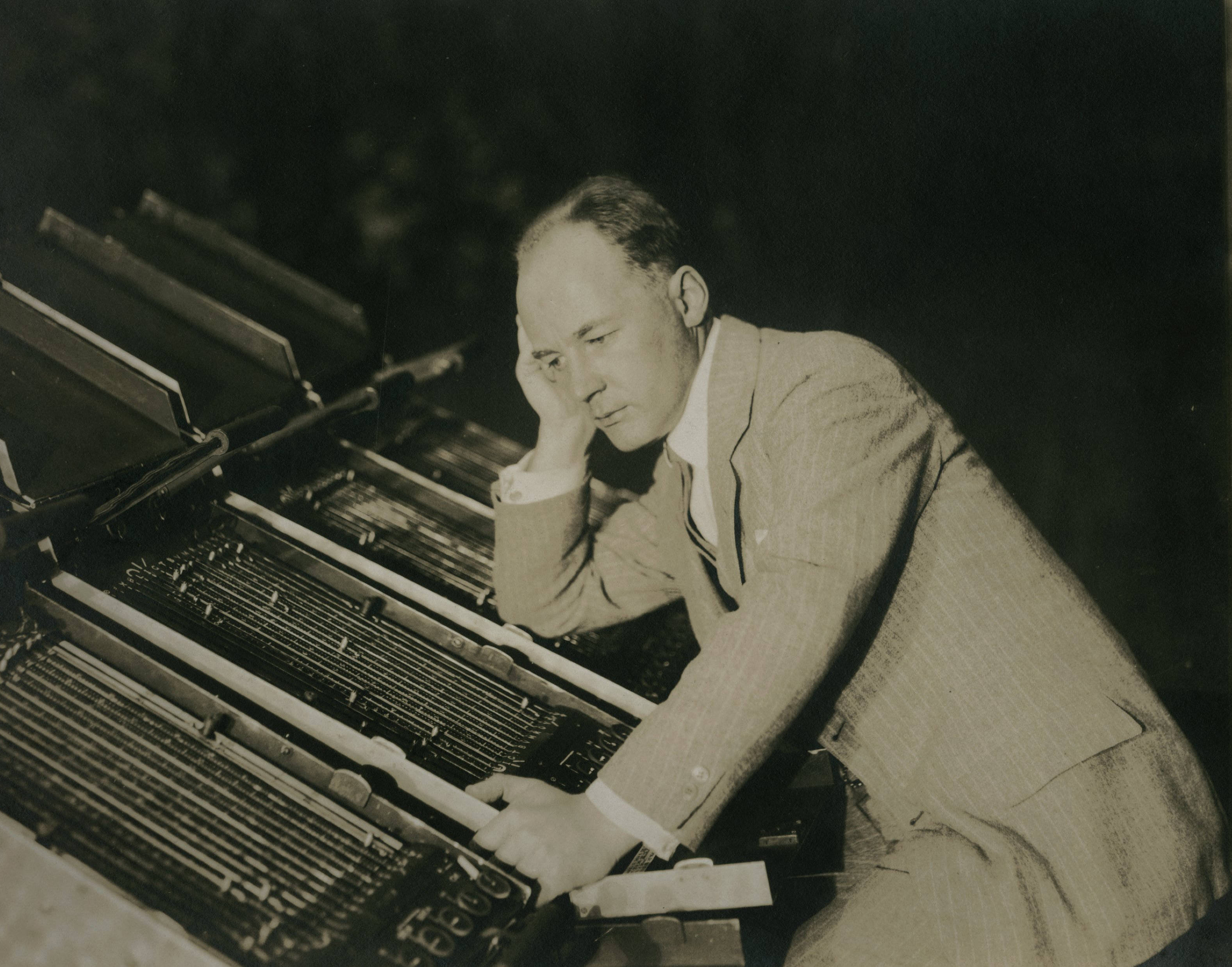
- Born: June 18, 1889; Naestved, Denmark
- Died: August 15, 1968 (aged 79); Nyack, New York, U.S.
- Occupations: Musician; inventor

Thomas Wilfred (June 18, 1889 in Naestved, Denmark – August 15, 1968 in Nyack, New York), born Richard Edgar Løvstrøm, was a visual artist, inventor, designer and musician. He is best known for his art of light, which he named lumia, and his designs for color organs called Clavilux. Wilfred was not fond of the term "color organ", and coined the word "Clavilux" from Latin meaning "light played by key". His innovative, mobile works prefigured the kinetic and op art movement and the advent of light art in America, and influenced subsequent generations of visual artists, including James Turrell.

== Biography ==
Wilfred's father ran a photography studio, and young Wilfred was exposed to the arts at a young age. He studied painting and poetry in Paris, and found early success as "Wilfred the Lute Player" traveling Europe and America performing minstrel songs on the archaic lute.

Around 1905, Wilfred began to experiment with bits of colored glass and light sources. After moving to New York he, along with Claude Fayette Bragdon and 'Kirk' Kirkpatrick Brice cofounded a group of Theosophists called the Prometheans. The Prometheans were dedicated to exploring spiritual matters through modern artistic expression. Brice served also as patron to the group.

While many people had experimented with light as an artistic medium (most notably the color organs) Wilfred was the first to speak of light as a formal art. He coined the term "lumia" to describe "an eighth art" where light would stand on its own as an expressive art-form. Wilfred was passionate that lumia should be a silent art.

Wilfred's mechanisms were often complex designs that have been described as from the "Rube Goldberg school". He was a trained artist, but had little mechanical schooling. That said, his devices were very sturdy, and many still function with most of the original parts.

In 1919, Wilfred constructed the Clavilux Model A in his Long Island studio (located on the Brice estate). The first public recital came in 1922 and featured performances on the Clavilux Model B for audiences at the Neighborhood Playhouse in New York. The press was highly receptive. In the audience that first night was Leopold Stokowski.

The Clavilux was a complex instrument which allowed a person to create and perform lumia compositions. Later models B-H were touring and lecture models, the last one being built prior to W.W.II.

Wilfred founded the Art Institute of Light, which had a recital hall in Chelsea, and then later at the Grand Central Palace.

World War II found the Grand Central Palace theatre turned into an Army induction center, and Wilfred did his part for the Allies by serving as a translator.

After the war, Wilfred no longer performed Clavilux recitals, concentrating his work on recorded lumia and theatrical projection.

Wilfred was also an early pioneer in working with projected scenery for the theatre. His initial success in this was a 1930 Broadway production of Ibsen's The Vikings. Wilfred did seminal work in the 1950s with the University of Washington's John Ashby Conway in this field.

== Clavilux works ==
Starting in the late 1920s, Wilfred began to create smaller, less complex lumia devices, some were meant for home exhibition, while others were designed for installation in museums and art galleries:

- Tabletop Clavilux, or "Luminar"
- Home Clavilux, or "Clavilux Jr."
- Home Clavilux (these differed from the Clavilux Jr.)
- Recorded Lumia Compositions

Starting in 1931, he began to shift his emphasis with lumia from concert recitals to museum and gallery exhibitions.

There are only about thirty-five extant Clavilux Jr. and lumia compositions. Wilfred has explicitly stated his objections to recording lumia works on film (in his writings collected in Thomas Wilfred's Clavilux), making the survival of his works dependent on the existence of his machines. Most of the extant works are in the Epstein Collection, and the Epstein family has loaned lumia compositions to museums world-wide. In 2003, two of the original Clavilux (Models E & G) were rescued from an East Village eviction dumpster, and are now stored in Seattle, Washington awaiting restoration by the Epsteins.

== Museum exhibitions ==
In 1952, he was included in the influential Museum of Modern Art exhibition 15 Americans, alongside Abstract Expressionists such as Jackson Pollock, Willem de Kooning, and Mark Rothko. At this point in his career, Wilfred shifted from a musical to a painting-based analogy for lumia in an attempt to explain it to the broader public. One of his installations, "Lumia Suite, Opus 158," enchanted MoMA visitors from 1964 until 1980, when it was dismantled and placed in storage. The Museum of Modern Art owns three Wilfred lumia compositions, and many artists of the Psychedelic era were inspired to work with light after seeing the MoMA compositions.

Because of his influence on this generation of artists, Wilfred's final work "Lucatta, Opus 162" was included in the "Summer of Love" exhibition, which was hosted by the Whitney Museum in the spring of 2007.

In 2017, Yale University Art Gallery organized the first exhibition dedicated solely to Wilfred and his light compositions in more than forty years. It was on view at Yale University Art Gallery from February 17, 2017 – July 23, 2017, before traveling to the Smithsonian American Art Museum in Washington, D.C. from October 6, 2017 – January 7, 2018.

== In popular culture ==
In 2011, brief excerpts of "Opus 161", Wilfred's penultimate lumia work, was featured at several important points in the Terrence Malick film The Tree of Life.

== See also ==
- Clavier à lumières
- Color organ
- Louis Bertrand Castel
- Mary Hallock-Greenewalt
- Oskar Fischinger
- William Moritz
- Lumia Art
