= Light organ =

Electronic sound-responsive lighting device

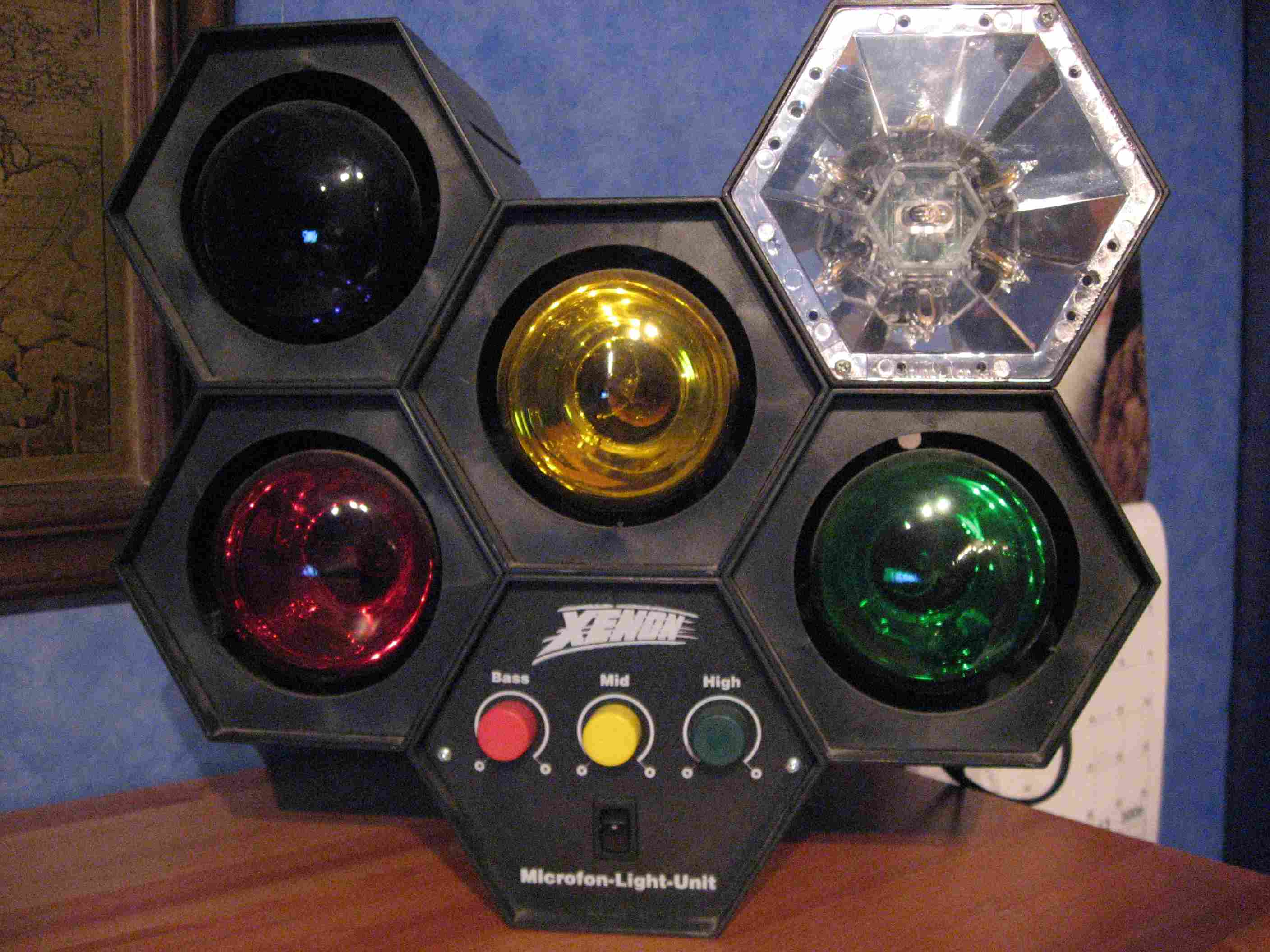
Light organ with strobe light

A light organ is an electronic device that automatically converts an audio signal (such as music) into rhythmic light effects. Light organs became popular in the 1970s as lighting effects for discotheques and dance parties. During this period, home entertainment manufacturer Morse-Electrophonic produced stereo systems with built-in light organ displays, such as their "Stereo Bar" model. The multicolored lights would pulsate to the beat of the music.

The circuit of a light organ separates the audio signal into frequency bands and controls the light channels according to the average level of each band using dimmers. A typical party light organ of the 1970s featured three spotlights—red, green, and blue—responding to bass, medium, and high frequencies respectively.

Due to their simple structure, light organs became popular DIY projects for electronics hobbyists in the 1970s and can still be found for sale on the internet.

== History ==
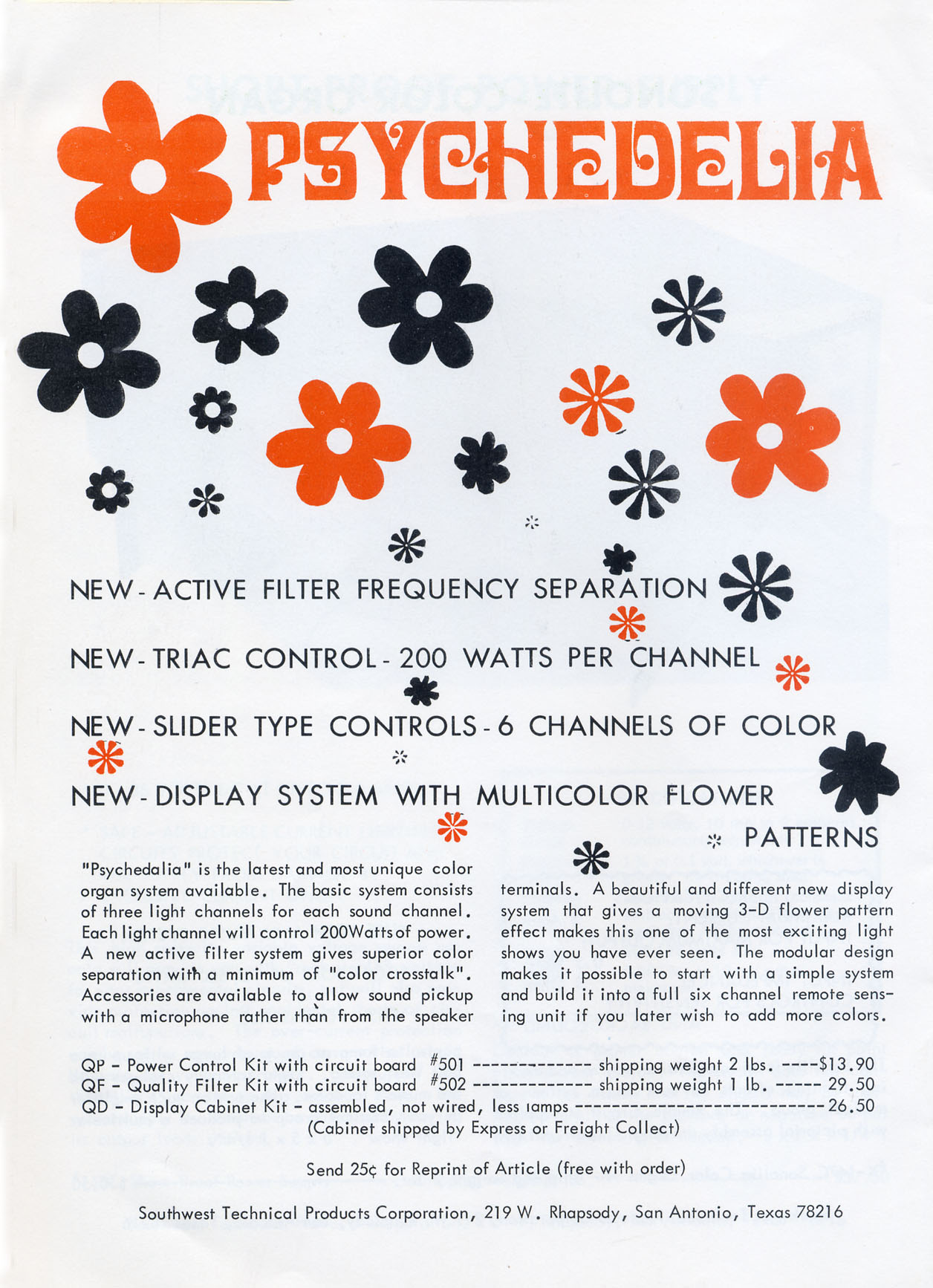
1969 SWTPC advertisement for the "Psychedelia" color organ

Commercial kits emerged in the mid-1960s. Southwest Technical Products Corporation (SWTPC) offered early examples, including the single-channel "Sonolite" (1968), capable of controlling 500 watts of lighting, and the four-channel "Psychedelia" series (1969–1972), with an 800-watt capacity per channel. SWTPC's later "Psychedelia II" used digital sampling techniques as an alternative to analog filters, switching rapidly between channels to create different visual effects.

In 1971, the Rickenbacker guitar company offered their 331LS "Lightshow" model (and matching bass, model 4005LS). The body contained a three-channel light organ with a dimmer, where each channel corresponded to the pitch of the strings being played. The soundboard on these models was replaced with thin Plexiglas cutouts over a translucent moire diffraction material.

Heathkit's TD-1006 kit (1975) used a geometric star-burst pattern of 140 lights arranged in alternating color circles rather than a random light arrangement. The unit used four bandpass filters at 80, 350, 1000, and 3000 Hz to control red, blue, green, and amber lights respectively, producing effects that appeared to pulsate, explode, and pinwheel with the music.

With the widespread adoption of affordable PCs, some hobbyists began experimenting with using computers for frequency analysis instead of analog filters.

== See also ==
- Color organ
- Discotheque
- Lighting console
