= Alexander Wallace Rimington =

English painter

Alexander Wallace Rimington (1854–1918), ARE, RBA, Hon. FSA was an English artist, an etcher, painter, illustrator, author and Professor of Fine Arts at Queen's College, London. He also invented a keyboard instrument that was designed to project different colours in harmony with music.

== Background ==
Rimington was born in Westbourne Terrace, Westminster, England, on 9 October 1853. His mother was Annette Hannah Cartwright (1827–1878), daughter of Susan and William Bentley Cartwright. His father, Alexander Rimington (1827–1868), was a merchant banker with business interests in India, in partnership with his brothers and his brother-in-law, Henry Durancé Cartwright. In 1865, their business – known in England as Rimington, Cartwright and Co. and in Bombay, India, as Leckie and Co. – took a reversal and failed. In consequence, Alexander Rimington signed over his estates and effects to the creditors of the business. He died on 8 August 1868 in Weston-super-Mare, Somerset, at the age of 41. He was buried in All Saints Church, Selsley, Gloucester, on the Stanley Park estate of his brother-in-law, Sir Samuel Stephens Marling, 1st Baronet. After the death of her husband Rimington's mother lived at Stanley Hall with the Marling family, and when she died in 1878 she was also buried in All Saints churchyard.

Alexander Wallace Rimington, was the eldest of their three children; he attended Windlesham House School from 1864 to 1865 and Clifton College between January 1868 and December 1869. He studied art in Paris and London and became a pupil of landscape painter John Dearle. In 1884 Rimington married Charlotte Haig (1859–1913), born in Edinburgh, the daughter of Catherine Matilda and George Andrew Haig. The couple were married in the British Legation in Munich, Germany. Rimington had family links in Germany, his aunt, Eliza Rimington (1820–1894), had married Otto George Baron von Rosenberg of Dresden in 1854. Their daughter, Alice Harÿ Ottilie von Rosenberg (1865–1948), married Rimington's brother Frank (1856–1935) in 1891. (Note: Alice Harÿ Ottilie von Rosenberg's sister Annie married Sir Arthur Fell.) Following the death of Charlotte in 1913, Rimington remarried to fellow watercolourist, Evelyn Jane Whyley (1870–1958).

== Career ==
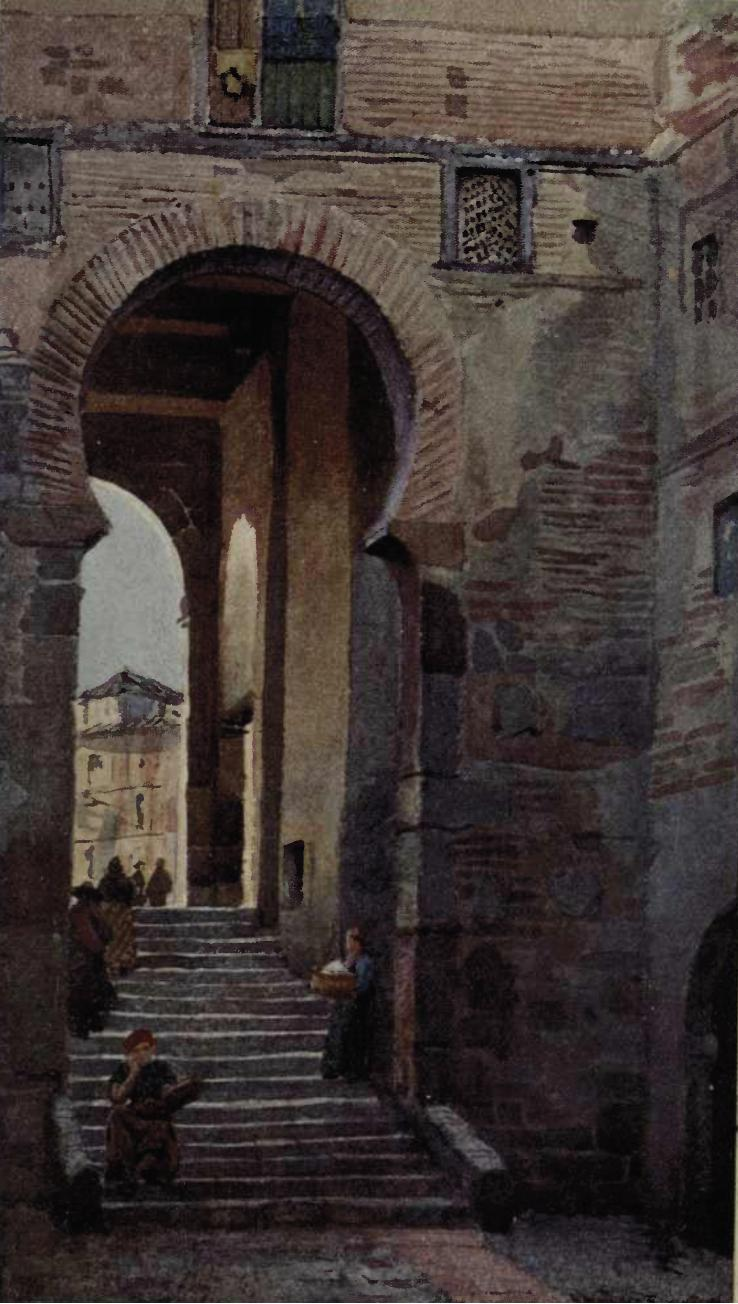
Toledo – Puerta de Zocodover, from The Cities of Spain

Rimington took an interest in mechanical engineering: for a time he was a partner in a machinery agency based in the City of London and in 1875 he gave notice of a patent for a device to measure the delivery of liquids and solids,

He became a skilled etcher, and in 1887 was elected as Associate Member of the Royal Society of Painters Etchers and Engravers. He considered the reproduction quality of etching superior to that of ink drawings. In an exchange of letters published in the Pall Mall Gazette in 1889, Joseph Pennell (a Fellow of the Society), openly disagreed with Rimington's views, saying that he lacked awareness of the mechanical part of the art, and that the photo engraving of ink drawings provided the equal of autographic etching.

He first exhibited at the Royal Academy Summer Exhibition in 1880 with a picture titled An "Inche" on the Blackwater, South of Ireland; his address at this time was given as Weston-super-Mare. Over the years he exhibited 34 works at the summer show and often these reflected his travels on the continent of Europe. Between 1882 and 1888 his paintings at the exhibition included landscapes of the Pyrenees, Austrian forests, Innsbruck, Vienna and the Tyrol. In 1885 his address was given as Villa Regina, Meran, South Austria. Later works included pictures of landscapes in Italy, Spain and Dresden, Germany. He was also a frequent exhibitor at the Fine Art Society (1893, 1897, 1899, 1902, 1904, 1909, 1912) and other venues that included the Royal Society of British Artists, the Royal Society of Painters in Watercolour, the Royal Society of Painters, Etchers and Engravers and the Royal Oil Painters Institute. His exhibitions at the Fine Art Society often included large numbers of his works. For example, the one in 1897 titled Italy – Its Landscape and Architecture included 138 of his watercolours.

Rimington's work was also used for book illustrations. In 1906 Edward Hutton published The Cities of Spain that included 24 coloured plates by Rimington. Rimington's brother, Frank Cartwright Rimington (1856–1935), used one of his brother's etching in his book Motor rambles in central Europe; some descriptions and some reflections (1927) but he also used six illustrations by Rimington's widow, Evelyn Jane Whyley Rimington.

In 1917 Rimington wrote and published The Conscience of Europe, the War and the Future One contemporary reviewer of the book wrote that "The author fearlessly points the inhumanity of war, and warns against the persistent attempt of the rulers of too many countries to bind the shackles of a narrow, short-sighted, and aggressive " patriotism " upon them, making a just and reasonable peace and a league of nations more and more difficult, and postponing them further and further into the dark future of a ruined civilisation."

== Colour-Organ ==
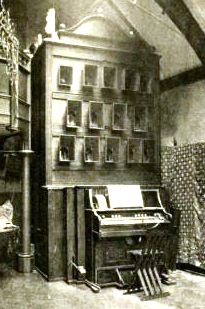
Photograph of A. Wallace Rimington's invention the Colour Organ

Rimington spent many years designing and developing an instrument that he called a colour organ that could project colours in harmony with music. The early versions were mute and the operator accompanied the music, but Rimington foresaw the development of an organ that could produce both music and displays of synchronised colour. In his book Colour music : the art of mobile colour, published in 1912, Rimington described the internal workings of the instrument: a powerful white light was produced from an arc-light of 13,000 candlepower which passed through two bisulphide of carbon prisms providing a colour spectrum. These colours were then mixed and projected onto a screen via diaphragms under the control of the operator using a keyboard and pedals. One of the first patents he took out was in 1894 and the following year he gave a talk and demonstration of the instrument at St James's Hall, accompanying music by Frédéric Chopin and Richard Wagner. Further concerts were given in 1895 at St James's Hall and the Free Trade Hall, Manchester with mixed receptions.

In about 1910 composer Alexander Scriabin prepared a symphonic work called Prometheus: The Poem of Fire in which he scored both music and a coloured lighting accompaniment. The device used to provide the display was called a clavier à lumières. In 1914 conductor Sir Henry Wood indicated his intention to perform the work at Queen's Hall, using Rimington's colour organ. However, World War I prevented this and the first performance combining light and music was in New York in 1915 using an instrument designed by Preston S. Miller, the president of the Illuminating Engineering Society.

== Defence of the Realm Act ==
At the Beaumaris Police Court on Saturday 4 September 1915, Rimington was charged with a breach of the Defence of the Realm Act 1914, for making a sketch of a section of the Menai Straits without a permit. He admitted the offence but pleaded ignorance of having been sketching in a restricted area. He had been unaware that the area was under such a prohibition and suggested that the Home Office should get such areas more clearly defined. The case was dismissed, but the presiding magistrate said that the police had been justified in their action.

== Final years ==
Rimington was elected a full Member of the Royal Society of British Artists in 1903. He died on 14 May 1918 in the vicarage at All Saints Church, Selsley and was buried in the same churchyard as his parents. His sister and sister-in-law are also buried there. His wife, Evelyn Jane Whyley, died in 1958 and is buried in St. Mary's, Cholsey, Oxfordshire. Rimington's brother Frank died in Monaco in 1935.
