= Color organ =

Device that produces a visual display to accompany music

The term color organ refers to a tradition of mechanical devices built to represent sound and accompany music in a visual medium. The earliest created color organs were manual instruments based on the harpsichord design. By the 1900s, they were electromechanical. In the early 20th century, a silent color organ tradition (Lumia) developed. In the 1960s and 1970s, the term "color organ" became popularly associated with electronic devices that responded to their music inputs with light shows. The term "light organ" is increasingly being used for these devices, allowing "color organ" to reassume its original meaning.

== History of the concept ==
The dream of creating a visual music comparable to auditory music found its fulfillment in animated abstract films by artists such as Oskar Fischinger, Len Lye and Norman McLaren; but long before them, many people built instruments, usually called "color organs", that would display modulated colored light in some kind of fluid fashion comparable to music.

— William Moritz

In 1590, Gregorio Comanini described an invention by the Mannerist painter Arcimboldo of a system for creating color-music, based on apparent luminosity (light-dark contrast) instead of hue.

In 1725, French Jesuit monk Louis Bertrand Castel proposed the idea of Clavecin pour les yeux (Ocular Harpsichord). In the 1740s, German composer Telemann went to France to see it, composed some pieces for it, and wrote a book about it. It had 60 small colored glass panes, each with a curtain that opened when a key was struck. In about 1742, Castel proposed the clavecin oculaire (a light organ) as an instrument to produce both sound and the "proper" light colors.

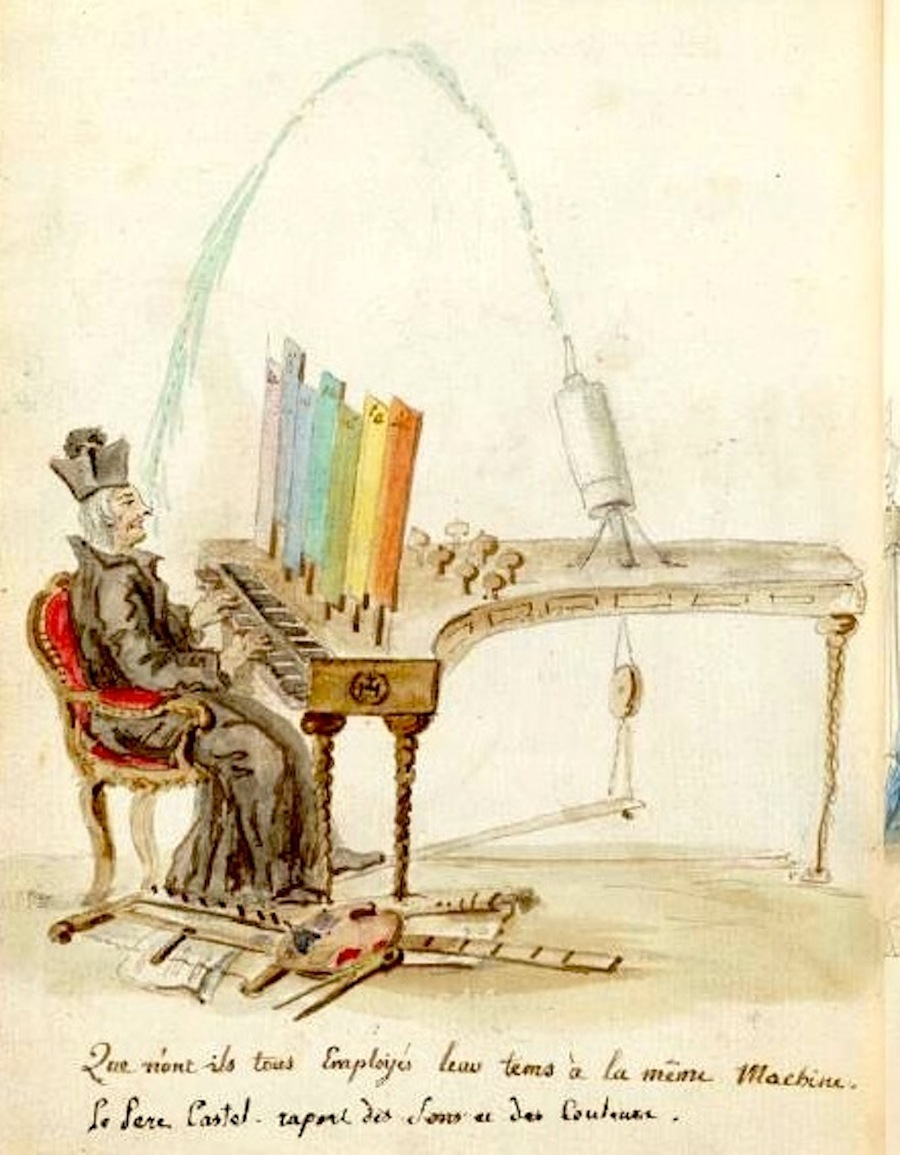
A caricature of Louis-Bertrand Castel's "ocular organ" by Charles Germain de Saint Aubin

In 1743, Johann Gottlob Krüger, a professor at the University of Hall, proposed his own version of the ocular harpsichord.

In 1816, Sir David Brewster proposed the Kaleidoscope as a form of visual-music that became immediately popular.

In 1877, U.S. artist, inventor Bainbridge Bishop gets a patent for his first Color Organ. The instruments were lighted attachments designed for pipe organs that could project colored lights onto a screen in synchronization with musical performance. Bishop built three of the instruments; each was destroyed in a fire, including one in the home of P. T. Barnum.

In 1893, British painter Alexander Wallace Rimington invented the Clavier à lumières. Rimington's Colour Organ attracted much attention, including that of Richard Wagner and Sir George Grove. It has been incorrectly claimed that his device formed the basis of the moving lights that accompanied the New York City premiere of Alexander Scriabin's synaesthetic symphony Prometheus: The Poem of Fire in 1915. The instrument that accompanied that premiere was lighting engineer Preston S. Millar's chromola, which was similar to Rimington's instrument.

In a 1916 art manifesto, the Italian Futurists Arnaldo Ginna and Bruno Corra described their experiments with "color organ" projection in 1909. They also painted nine abstract films, now lost.

In 1916, the Russian futurist painter Vladimir Baranoff Rossiné premiered the Optophonic Piano at his one-man exhibition in Kristiana (Oslo, Norway).

In 1918, American concert pianist Mary Hallock-Greenewalt created an instrument she called the Sarabet. Also an inventor, she patented nine inventions related to her instrument, including the rheostat.

In 1921, Arthur C. Vinageras proposed the Chromopiano, an instrument resembling and played like a grand piano, but designed to project "chords" composed of colored lights.

In the 1920s, Danish-born Thomas Wilfred created the Clavilux, a color organ, ultimately patenting seven versions. By 1930, he had produced 16 "Home Clavilux" units, which were sold with glass disks bearing art as "Clavilux Juniors". Wilfred coined the word lumia to describe the art. Significantly, Wilfred's instruments were designed to project colored imagery, not just fields of colored light as with earlier instruments.

In 1925, Hungarian composer Alexander Laszlo wrote a text called Color-Light-Music; Laszlo toured Europe with a color organ.

In Hamburg, Germany, from the late 1920s to the early 1930s, several color organs were demonstrated at a series of Colour-Sound Congresses (Kongreß für Farbe-Ton-Forschung). Ludwig Hirschfeld Mack performed his Farbenlichtspiel colour organ at these congresses and at several other festivals and events in Germany. He had developed this color organ at the Bauhaus school in Weimar, with Kurt Schwerdtfeger.

The 1939 London Daily Mail Ideal Home Exhibition featured a "72-way Light Console and Compton Organ for Colour Music", as well as a 70 feet, 230 kW "Kaleidakon" tower.

From 1935 to 1977, Charles Dockum built a series of Mobilcolor Projectors, his versions of silent color organs.

In the late 1940s, Oskar Fischinger created the Lumigraph that produced imagery by pressing objects/hands into a rubberized screen that would protrude into colored light. The imagery of this device was manually generated and accompanied by various musical pieces. It required two people to operate: one to make changes to colors, the other to manipulate the screen. Fischinger performed the Lumigraph in Los Angeles and San Francisco in the late 1940s through the early 1950s. The Lumigraph was licensed by the producers of the 1964 sci-fi film, The Time Travelers. The Lumigraph does not have a keyboard and does not generate music.

In 2000, Jack Ox and David Britton created "The Virtual Color Organ". The 21st Century Virtual Reality Color Organ is a computational system that translates musical compositions into visual performances. It uses supercomputing power to produce 3D visual images and sound from Musical Instrument Digital Interface (MIDI) files, enabling it to play a diverse range of compositions. Performances take place in interactive, immersive, virtual reality environments such as the Cave Automatic Virtual Environment (CAVE), VisionDome, or Immersadesk. Because it is a 3D immersive world, the Color Organ is also a place—that is, a performance space.

== Further study ==
California Institute of the Arts scholar William Moritz has documented color organs as a form of visual music, particularly as a precursor to visual music cinema. His papers and original research are in the collection of the Center for Visual Music, Los Angeles, which also has other historical color organ papers and resources.

== See also ==
- Cymatics
- Visual music
- Laser harp
- AudioCube – an electronic device capable of controlling as well visualizing sound and music through built-in full colour RGB lighting
- New Epoch Notation Painting
- Light organ – an electronic device which automatically converts an audio signal into rhythmic light effects, which was popular in 1970s discotheques.
- Jack Ox and David Britton's Virtual Color Organ – a computational system for translating musical compositions into visual performance.

== Bibliography ==
- Thomas Wilfred's Clavilux. Borgo Press. 2006.
- Betancourt, Michael (2005). Mary Hallock-Greenewalt: The Complete Patents. Wildside Press.
- Betancourt, Michael (2004). Visual Music Instrument Patents Volume 1. Borgo Press.
- Franssen, Maarten (1991). "The ocular harpsichord of Louis-Bertrand Castel: The science and aesthetics of an eighteenth-century cause célèbre" (PDF). Tractrix: Yearbook for the History of Science, Medicine, Technology and Mathematics. 3: 15–77.
- Peacock, Kenneth (1988). "Instruments to Perform Color-Music: Two Centuries of Technological Experimentation". Leonardo. 21 (4): 397–406. doi:10.2307/1578702. JSTOR 1578702.
- Tornitore, Tonino (1985). "Giuseppe Arcimboldi E Il Suo Presunto Clavicembalo Oculare". Revue des Etudes Italiennes. 31 (1–4): 58–77.
- Caswell, Austin B. (Winter 1980). "The Pythagoreanism of Arcimboldo". The Journal of Aesthetics and Art Criticism. 39 (2): 155–161. doi:10.2307/429809. JSTOR 429809.
- Comanini, Gregorio (1962). "Il Figino, overo del fine della pittura". Trattati d'Arte del Cinquecento: Fra Manerismo e Controrifroma, Volume Terzo. Giuseppe Laterza & Figli: 238–379.
- Klein, Adrian Bernard (1937). Coloured Light An Art Medium (3rd ed.). London: The Technical Press.
- Ox, Jack (2001). 2 Performances in the 21st Century Virtual Organ: Gridjam and Im Januar am Nil. Seventh International Conference on Virtual Systems and MultiMedia: Enhance realities: Augmented and Unplugged. UC Berkeley.
- Ox, Jack (2002). "The Color Organ and Collaboration". In Candy, L.; Edmonds, E. A. (eds.). Explorations in Art and Technology. London: Springer. pp. 211–218, 302.
- Ox, Jack (2002). Two Performances in the 21st Century Virtual Color Organ. Creativity and Cognition (Keynote presentation). Loughborough University, Loughborough, UK.
- Ox, Jack (2005). Gridjam. Creativity and Cognition 2005. London, UK.
