= Oskar Fischinger =

German-American animator and filmmaker (1900–1967)

- Born: Oskar Wilhelm Fischinger; June 22, 1900; Gelnhausen, German Empire
- Died: January 31, 1967 (aged 66); Los Angeles, California, U.S.
- Occupations: Abstract animator, filmmaker, painter
- Years active: 1920–1947
- Notable work: Motion Painting No. 1
- Spouse: Elfriede Fischinger (1932–1967; his death)
- Children: 5

Oskar Wilhelm Fischinger (June 22, 1900 – January 31, 1967) was a German-American animator and filmmaker notable for creating abstract musical animation many decades before the appearance of computer graphics and music videos. He created special effects for Fritz Lang's 1929 Woman in the Moon, one of the first sci-fi rocket films, and influenced Disney's Fantasia. He made over 50 short films and painted around 800 canvases, many of which are in museums, galleries, and collections worldwide. Among his film works is Motion Painting No. 1 (1947), which is now listed on the National Film Registry of the U.S. Library of Congress.

== Biography ==
Born in Gelnhausen, near Frankfurt, Fischinger apprenticed at an organ-building firm after he finished school until the owners were drafted into World War I. The next year he worked as a draftsman in an architect's office, until he too was called to duty. However, since he was too "unhealthy", he was rejected from combat duty. After the war, the Fischinger family moved west to Frankfurt. There Fischinger attended a trade school and worked as an apprentice, eventually obtaining an Engineer's Diploma.

=== Early career ===
In Frankfurt, Fischinger met the theatre critic Bernhard Diebold, who in 1921 introduced Fischinger to the work and personage of Walter Ruttmann, a pioneer in abstract film. At this time, Fischinger was experimenting with colored liquids and three-dimensional modelling materials such as wax and clay. He invented a "Wax Slicing Machine", which synchronized a vertical slicer with a movie camera's shutter, enabling the efficient imaging of progressive cross-sections through a length of molded wax and clay. Fischinger wrote to Ruttmann about his machine, who expressed interest. Moving to Munich, Fischinger licensed the wax slicing machine to Ruttmann, who used it to make some backgrounds for Lotte Reiniger's The Adventures of Prince Achmed, an animated fairy tale film, making the moving backgrounds and magic scenes. During this time Fischinger shot many abstract tests of his own using the machine. Some of these are distributed today under the assigned title Wax Experiments.

In 1924, Fischinger formed a company with American entrepreneur Louis Seel to produce satirical cartoons that tended toward mature audiences. One survives in his film estate, Pierrette I. He also continued to make abstract films and tests of his own, trying new and different techniques, including multiple projector performances. "In 1926 and 1927, Fischinger performed his own multiple projector film shows with various musical accompaniments. These shows were titled Fieber (Fever), Vakuum, and Macht (Power)'".

Facing financial difficulties, Fischinger borrowed from his family, and then his landlady. Finally, in an effort to escape bill collectors, Fischinger decided to surreptitiously depart Munich for Berlin in June 1927. Taking only his essential equipment, he walked 350 miles through the countryside, shooting single frames that were released many decades later as the film Walking from Munich to Berlin.

=== Berlin ===
Arriving in Berlin, Fischinger borrowed some money from a relative and set up a studio on Friedrichstraße. He soon was creating special effects for various films. His own proposals for cartoons were not accepted by producers or distributors, however. In 1928, he was hired to work on the feature film Woman in the Moon (German: Frau im Mond), directed by Fritz Lang, which provided him a steady salary for a time. On his own time, he experimented with charcoal-on-paper animation. He produced a series of abstract Studies that were synchronized to popular and classical music. A few of the early Studies were synchronized to new record releases by Electrola, and screened at first-run theatres with a tail credit advertising the record, thus making them, in a sense, the very first music videos.

The Studies – Numbers 1 through 12 – were well received and many were distributed to first-run theatres worldwide, as far as Japan and South America. His Studie Nr. 5 screened at the 1931 "Congress for Colour-Music Research" to critical acclaim. In 1932, Universal Pictures purchased distribution rights to one of the Studies for the American public. The special effects Fischinger did for clients' films and commercials led to his being called "the Wizard of Friedrichstraße". In 1932, Fischinger married Elfriede Fischinger, a first cousin from his hometown of Gelnhausen.

As the Nazis consolidated power after 1933, the abstract film and art communities and distribution possibilities quickly disappeared as the Nazis instituted their policies against what they termed "degenerate art". His brother Hans Fischinger showed his absolute film "Tanz der Farben" (i.e. The Dance of Colors) in Hamburg in 1939. Oskar Fischinger continued to make films, and commercials and advertisements, among them Muratti greift ein (translated as Muratti Gets in the Act, or Muratti Marches On) (1934), for a cigarette company, and Kreise (Circles) (1933–34), for the Tolirag advertising agency. The color Muratti commercial with its stop-motion dancing cigarettes screened all over the world. Fischinger managed to complete his abstract work Komposition in Blau in 1935. It was well-received critically, and contrary to popular myth, was legally registered. An agent from Metro-Goldwyn-Mayer screened prints of Komposition in Blau and Muratti in a small art theatre in Hollywood, and Ernst Lubitsch was impressed by the films and the audience's enthusiastic response to the shorts. An agent from Paramount Pictures telephoned Fischinger, asking if he was willing to work in the United States, and Fischinger promptly agreed.

=== Hollywood ===
Upon arriving in Hollywood in February 1936, Fischinger was given an office at Paramount Pictures, German-speaking secretaries, an English tutor, and a weekly salary of $250. He and Elfriede socialized with the émigré community. As he waited for his assignment to begin, Fischinger sketched and painted. He prepared a film which was originally named Radio Dynamics, but known today as Allegretto, tightly synchronized to Ralph Rainger's tune "Radio Dynamics". This short film was planned for inclusion in the feature film The Big Broadcast of 1937 (1936). However, Paramount only planned to release in black-and-white film, which was not communicated to Fischinger when he began his work. Paramount would not allow even a test in color of Fischinger's film. Fischinger requested to be let out of his contract and left Paramount. Several years later, with the help of Hilla von Rebay and a grant from the Museum of Non-Objective Painting (later The Guggenheim), he was able to buy the film back from Paramount. Fischinger then redid and re-painted the cels and made a color version to his satisfaction which he then called Allegretto. According to biographer William Moritz, this became one of the most-screened and successful films of visual music's history, and one of Fischinger's most popular films.

Most of Fischinger's filmmaking attempts in America suffered difficulties. According to Moritz, Fischinger composed An Optical Poem (1937) to Franz Liszt's Second Hungarian Rhapsody for Metro-Goldwyn-Mayer, but received no profits due to studio bookkeeping systems. He designed the J. S. Bach Toccata and Fugue in D Minor sequence for Walt Disney Productions' Fantasia (1940), but quit without credit because Walt Disney altered his designs to be more representational. According to William Moritz, Fischinger contributed to the effects animation of the Blue Fairy's wand in Pinocchio (1940). In the 1950s, Fischinger created several animated TV advertisements, including one for Muntz TV.

The Museum of Non-Objective Painting commissioned him to synchronize a film with a march by John Philip Sousa in order to demonstrate loyalty to America, and then insisted that he make a film to Bach's Brandenburg Concerto No. 3, even though he wanted to make a film without sound in order to affirm the integrity of his non-objective imagery. Secretly, Fischinger composed the silent film Radio Dynamics (1942).

Frustrated in his filmmaking, Fischinger turned increasingly to oil painting as a creative outlet. According to Moritz, though the Guggenheim Foundation specifically requested a cel animation film, Fischinger made his Bach film Motion Painting No. 1 (1947) as a documentation of the act of painting, taking a single frame each time he made a brush stroke—and the multi-layered style merely parallels the structure of the Bach music without any tight synchronization. Although he never again received funding for any of his personal films (only some commercial work), the Motion Painting No. 1 won the Grand Prix at the Brussels International Experimental Film Competition in 1949. Three of Fischinger's films also made the 1984 Olympiad of Animation's list of the world's greatest films. On January 31, 1967, he died at the age of 66.

The Academy Film Archive has preserved many of Oskar Fischinger's films, including Motion Painting No. 1, Squares, and Spirals. In 1993, the Deutsches Filmmuseum in Frankfurt mounted the retrospective Optische Poesie: Oskar Fischinger, accompanied by a 111-page exhibition catalogue whose principal study, written by William Moritz, surveyed Fischinger's life and experimental film work.

== Lumigraph ==
In the late 1940s Fischinger invented the Lumigraph (patented in 1955) which some have mistakenly called a type of color organ. Fischinger had hoped to make the Lumigraph a commercial product, widely available for anyone, but this did not happen. The instrument produced imagery by pressing against a rubberized screen so it could protrude into a narrow beam of colored light. As a visual instrument, the size of its screen was limited by the reach of the performer. Two people were required to operate the Lumigraph: one to manipulate the screen to create imagery, and a second to change the colors of the lights on cue.

The device itself was silent, but was performed accompanying various music. Fischinger gave several performances in Los Angeles and one in San Francisco in the early 1950s, performing various classical and popular music pieces, and many were impressed by the machine's spectacular images. In 1964 the Lumigraph was used in the science fiction film The Time Travelers, in which it became a "lumichord", although this was not Fischinger's intent, but the decision of the film's producers. Fischinger's son Conrad even built two more machines in different sizes. After his death, his widow Elfriede and daughter Barbara gave performances with the Lumigraph, along with William Moritz, in Europe and the US.

Today one of the instruments is in the collection of the Deutsches Filmmuseum in Frankfurt, and the other two are in California. In February 2007 Barbara Fischinger performed on the original Lumigraph in Frankfurt, and in 2012 in Amsterdam.

== Films ==
- Wachs Experimente (1921-26)
- Stäbe (1923-27) - experiments, not a completed film
- Spiralen (c. 1926)
- Pierrette I (1926)
- Raumlichtkunst project, series of live performances (c. 1926)
- München-Berlin Wanderung (1927)
- Seelische Konstruktionen (c. 1927)
- Study Nr. 9 (1931)
- Ornament Sound experiments (c. 1931)
- Study Nr. 10 and 11 (1932)
- Study Nr. 12 (1932)
- Coloratura (1932)
- Study Nr. 13-fragment (1933-34)
- Kreise (Alle kreise erfasst Tolirag) (1933-34) - two versions
- Muratti greift ein (1934)
- Squares (1934)
- Swiss Trip (Rivers and Landscapes), (1934)
- Komposition in Blau (1935)
- Muratti Privat (1935)
- Allegretto (1936-1943) - two versions, one never filmed by Fischinger
- An Optical Poem (1937)
- An American March (1941)
- Radio Dynamics (1942)
- Motion Painting No. 1 (1947)
- Muntz TV and Oklahoma Gas Commercials (c. 1952)
- Numerous animation tests, fragments and experiments from the 1920s - 50s

== See also ==
- Clavier à lumières
- Len Lye
- List of German painters
- Music visualization
- Visual music

== Sources ==
- Moritz, William (2004). Optical Poetry: The Life and Work of Oskar Fischinger. Bloomington: IN: Indiana university press. ISBN 978-0253216410.
