= Clavier à lumières =

Keyboard instrument invented by Alexander Scriabin

The clavier à lumières ("keyboard with lights"), or tastiera per luce, as it appears in the score, was a musical instrument invented by Alexander Scriabin for use in his work Prometheus: Poem of Fire. Only one version of this instrument was constructed, for the performance of Prometheus: Poem of Fire in New York City in 1915. The instrument was supposed to be a keyboard, with notes corresponding to colors as given by Scriabin's synesthetic system, specified in the score. However, numerous synesthesia researchers have cast doubt on the claim that Scriabin was a synesthete.

The "Luce" part is notated on a treble staff with two parts, one proceeding on the circle of fifths during the piece, the other following the tonal centre of the music.

== Overview ==
Scriabin assigned the following colors to the following key areas:

Tone-to-color mapping

By chromatic scale
Note	Colour
C	red (intense)
C♯	violet or purple
D	yellow
D♯	flesh (glint of steel)
E	sky blue (moonshine or frost)
F	deep red
F♯	bright blue or violet
G	orange
G♯	violet or lilac
A	green
A♯	rose or steel
B	blue or pearly blue

When the notes are ordered by the circle of fifths, the colours are in order of a spectrum, which leads numerous synesthesia researchers to argue that he did not experience the physiological condition of synesthesia. Additionally, it has been argued that Scriabin's color associations were influenced by his theosophic readings and based on Sir Isaac Newton's Optics quoted by Louis Bertrand Castel:

Keys rearranged into a circle of fifths in order to show the spectral relationship

By spectrum
Colour	Note
deep red	F
red	C
orange	G
yellow	D
green	A
sky blue	E
blue	B
bright blue	F♯
violet or purple	C♯
lilac	G♯
flesh	D♯
rose	A♯

Scriabin was a friend of Nikolai Rimsky-Korsakov, who was a synesthete. Scriabin's assignments of colours to keys was not the same as Rimsky-Korsakov's perceptions, which is not an indication that Scriabin was not a synesthete as all synesthetes perceive different associations. Scriabin was also heavily influenced by Theosophy, which had its own different system of associating colors and pitches (in essence going up the visible spectrum from C to B chromatically, rather than by fifths).

== See also ==
- Chromesthesia
- Color organ
- Visual music
- Music visualization
- New Epoch Notation Painting
- List of people with synesthesia
