= Louis Bertrand Castel =

Mathematician, philosopher (1688–1757)

Louis Bertrand Castel (French pronunciation: [lwi bɛʁtʁɑ̃ kastɛl]; 5 November 1688 – 11 January 1757) was a French mathematician born in Montpellier, who entered the order of the Jesuits in 1703. Having studied literature, he afterwards devoted himself entirely to mathematics and natural philosophy. After moving from Toulouse to Paris in 1720, at the behest of Bernard de Fontenelle, Castel acted as the science editor of the Jesuit Journal de Trévoux.

He wrote several scientific works, that which attracted most attention at the time being his Optique des couleurs (1740), or treatise on the melody of colours. He also wrote Traité de physique sur la pesanteur universelle des corps (1724), Mathématique universelle (1728), and a critical account of the system of Sir Isaac Newton in 1743.

== Philosophical approach ==
Castel wrote on areas as wide-ranging as physics, mathematics, morals, aesthetics, theology and history. His philosophical approach attempted to reconcile fields and viewpoints. Castel based much of his work on analogical thinking, seeking to understand the physical and moral worlds through the discovery of analogies.

Castel's first major published work was his Traité de physique de la pesanteur universelle des corps (1724). He first attempted to systematise physical phenomena, through the mechanical action of universal gravity. He then considered a mechanistic world-view's shortcomings, from a theological and metaphysical perspective. He held humanity as central to natural philosophy, in that humans are embodied spirits whose actions, chosen with free will, affect the world around them and each other. In emphasising free will and the actions of mankind Castel attempted to counter deterministic views of man and nature.

Castel considered that true science should focus on readily experienced and described phenomena. His emphasis on the description and analysis of the perceived world was consistent with analogic thinking and phenomenal explanation. Castel actively opposed the idea of a science based on experimental methods, instruments, speculation and theorising.

== The Ocular Harpsichord ==
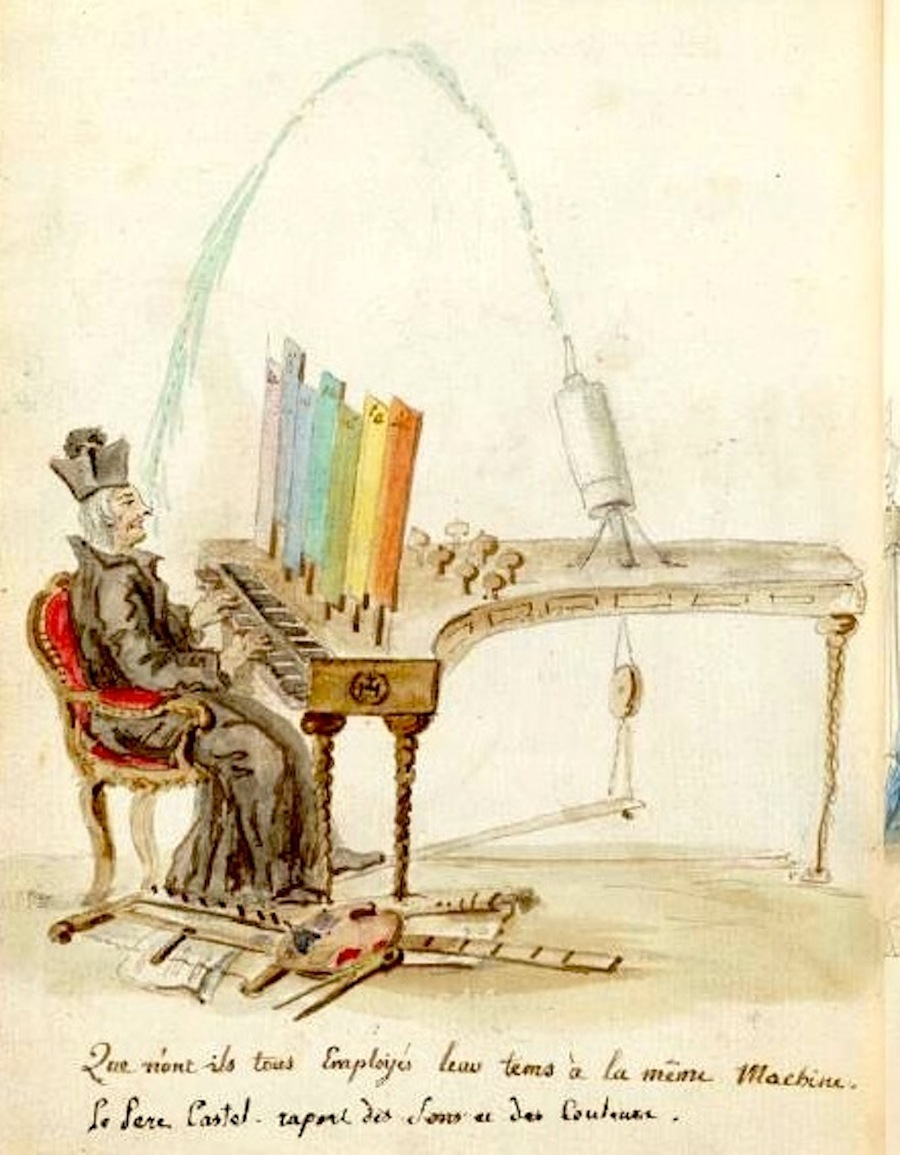
A caricature of Louis-Bertrand Castel's "ocular organ" by Charles Germain de Saint Aubin

Early on, Castel illustrated his optical theories with a proposal for a Clavecin pour les yeux (Ocular Harpsichord, 1725). A new series of articles, published in the Mercure de France in 1735, gave his idea wider currency. In 1739 the German composer Telemann went to France to see Castel's Ocular Harpsichord for himself. He ended up composing several pieces for it, as well as writing a description of it.

The ocular harpsichord had sixty small coloured glass panes, each with a curtain that opened when a key was struck. A second, improved model of the harpsichord was demonstrated for a small audience in December 1754. Pressing a key caused a small shaft to open, in turn allowing light to shine through a piece of stained glass. Castel thought of colour-music as akin to the lost language of paradise, where all men spoke alike, and he claimed that thanks to his instrument's capacity to paint sounds, even a deaf listener could enjoy music.

== Criticism of Newton ==
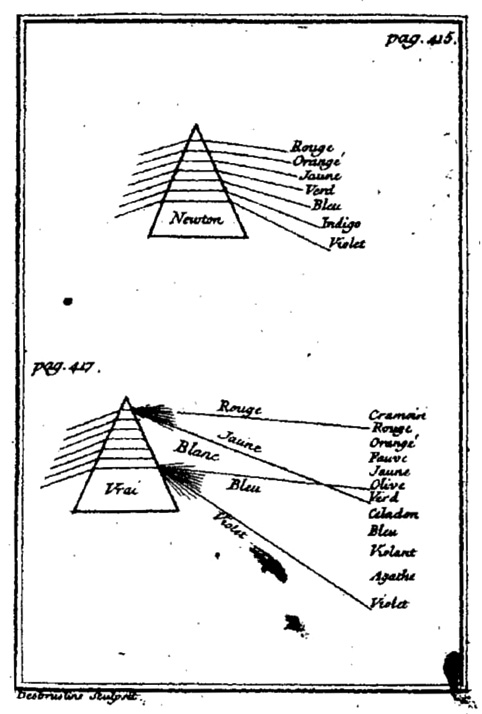
Castel's 1740 comparison of Newton's spectral colour description with his explanation in terms of the interaction of light and dark, which Goethe later developed into his Theory of Colours.

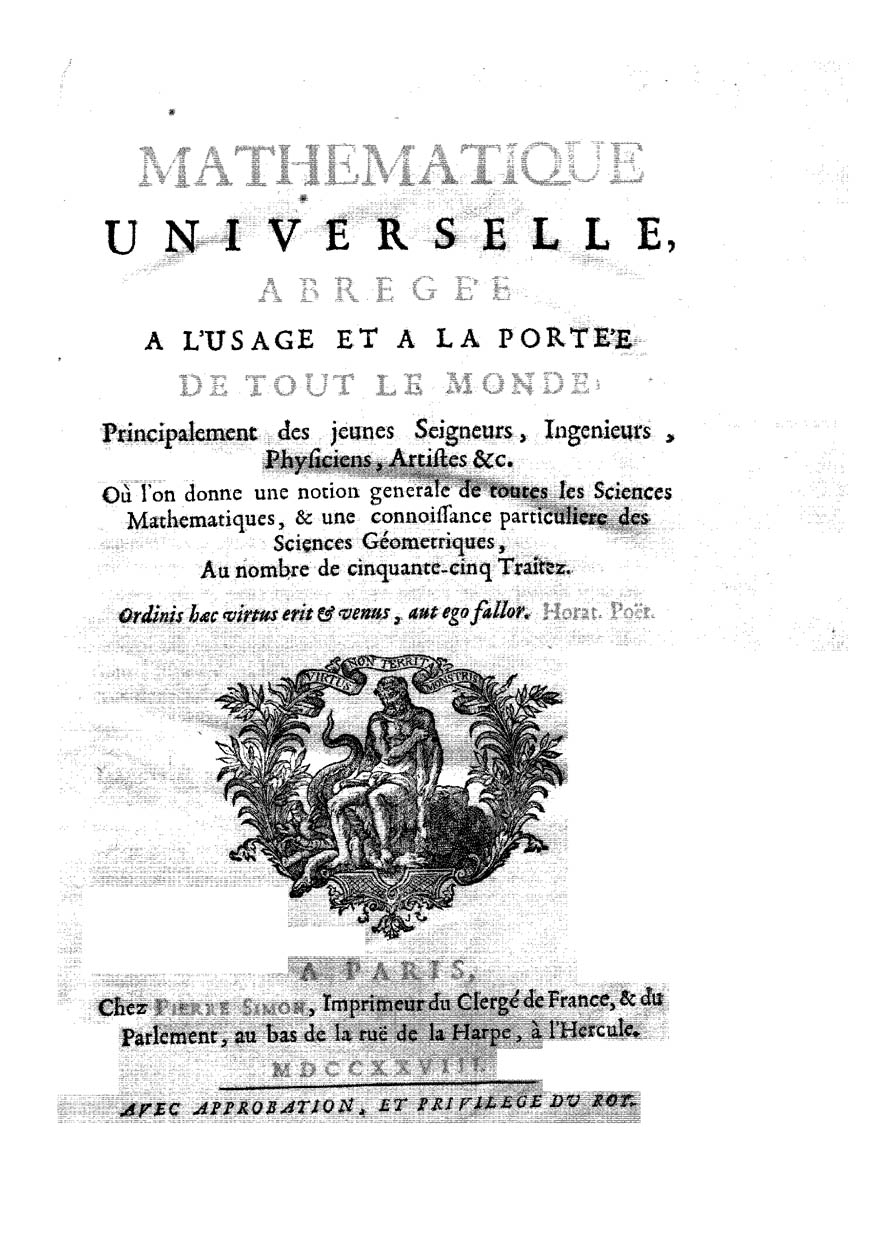
Mathématique universelle abregée à l'usage et à la portée de tout le monde, 1728

It was in 1740 that Louis Bertrand Castel published a criticism of Newton's spectral description of prismatic colour in which he observed that the colours of white light split by a prism depended on the distance from the prism, and that Newton was looking at a special case. It was an argument that Goethe later developed in his Theory of Colours.

== See also ==
- Color organ
