= 41st Karlovy Vary International Film Festival =

2006 film festival edition

The 41st Karlovy Vary International Film Festival took place from 30 June to 8 July 2006. The Crystal Globe was won by Sherrybaby, an American drama film written and directed by Laurie Collyer. The second prize, the Special Jury Prize was won ex aequo by the Bulgarian film Christmas Tree Upside Down, directed by Ivan Tscherkelov and Vasil Zhivkov, and by the Czech film Beauty in Trouble, directed by Jan Hřebejk.

== Juries ==
The following people formed the juries of the festival:

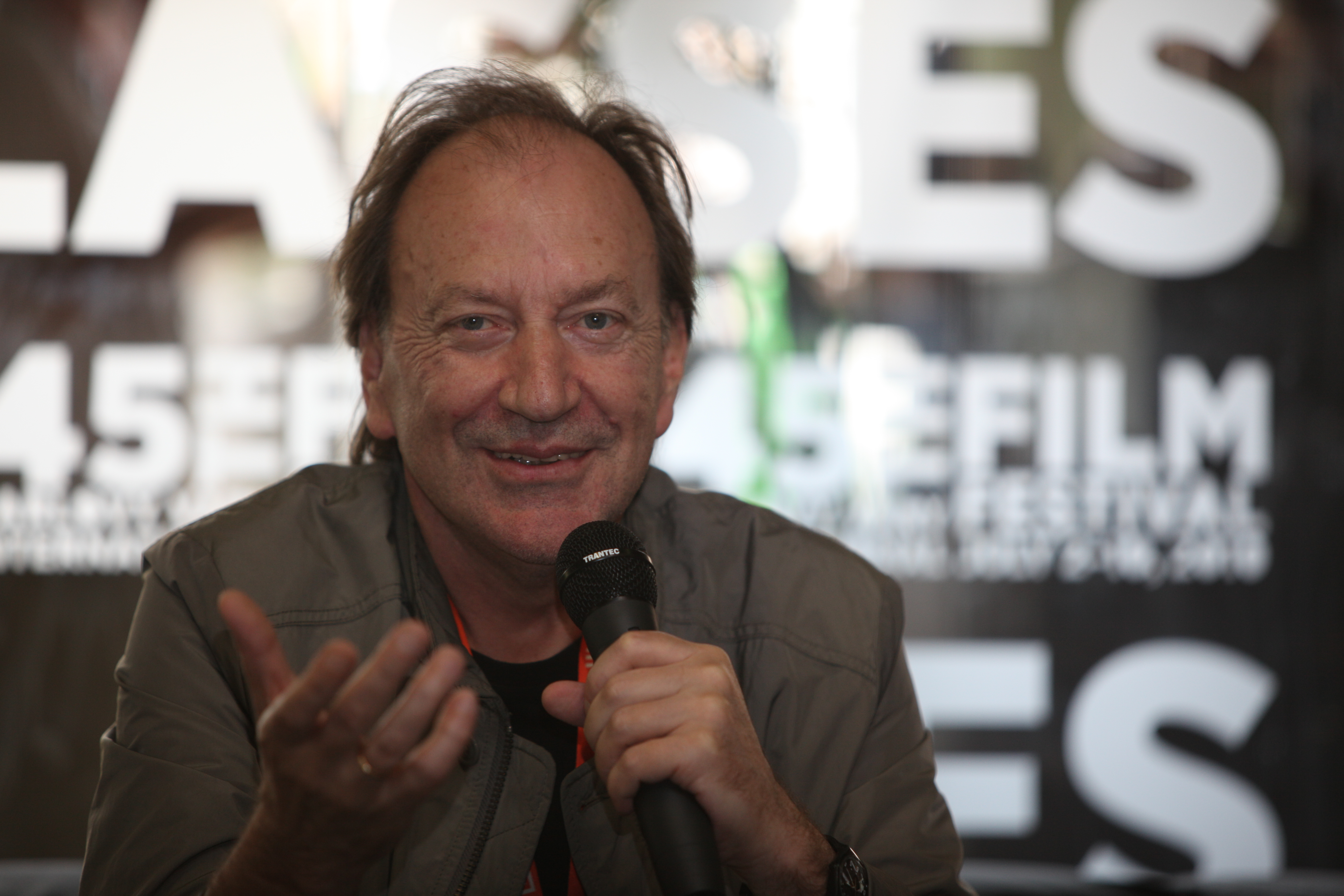
Goran Paskaljević, Jury president

Main competition

- Goran Paskaljević, Grand Jury President (Serbia)
- Bent Hamer (Norway)
- Leila Hatami (Iran)
- Coleman Hough (USA)
- Laurence Kardish (Canada)
- Juliusz Machulski (Poland)
- Karel Roden (Czech Republic)

Documentaries

- Fabrizio Grosoli, Chairman (Italy)
- Jana Boková (Czech Republic, Argentina)
- Tine Fischer (Denmark)
- Marek Hovorka (Czech Republic)
- Guntis Trekteris (Latvia)

East of the West

- Gulnara Abikejeva, Chairman (Kazakhstan)
- Stefan Kitanov (Bulgaria)
- Michaela Pavlátová (Czech Republic)
- Ray Privett (USA)
- Swetlana Sikora (Germany)

== Official selection awards ==
The following feature films and people received the official selection awards:

- Crystal Globe (Grand Prix) - Sherrybaby by Laurie Collyer (United States)
- Special Jury Prize (ex aequo):
  - Christmas Tree Upside Down (Obarnata elha) by Ivan Cherkelov (Bulgaria)
  - Beauty in Trouble (Kráska v nesnázích) by Jan Hřebejk (Czech Republic)
- Best Director Award - Joachim Trier for Reprise (Norway)
- Best Actress Award - Maggie Gyllenhaal for Sherrybaby (USA)
- Best Actor Award - Andrzej Hudziak for Several People, Little Time (Parę osób, mały czas) (Poland)
- Special mention of the jury: This Girl Is Mine (L'enfant d'une autre) by Virginie Wagon (France)

== Other statutory awards ==
Other statutory awards that were conferred at the festival:

- Best documentary film (over 30 min.) (ex aequo): Life in Loops by Timo Novotny (Austria) & In The Pit by Juan Carlos Rulfo (Mexico)
  - Special mention - Other worlds (Iné svety) by Marko Škop (Slovakia)
- Best documentary film (under 30 min.) - Views of a Retired Night Porter by Andreas Horvath (Austria)
- East of the West Award - Monkeys in Winter (Maimuni prez zimata) by Milena Andonova (Bulgaria / Germany)
  - Special Mention (ex aequo): White Palms (Fehér tenyér) by Szabolcs Hajdu (Hungary) & Tomorrow Morning (Sutra ujutru) by Oleg Novkovic (Serbia)
- Crystal Globe for Outstanding Artistic Contribution to World Cinema - Andy García (USA), Robert Shaye (USA), Jan Němec (Czech Republic)
- Audience Award - Other worlds (Iné svety) by Marko Škop (Slovakia)

== Non-statutory awards ==
The following non-statutory awards were conferred at the festival:

- FIPRESCI International Critics Award: Frozen City (Valkoinen kaupunki) by Aku Louhimies (Finland)
- Don Quixote Award: Reprise by Joachim Trier (Norway)
  - Special mention - Frozen City (Valkoinen kaupunki) by Aku Louhimies (Finland)
- Ecumenical Jury Award: The Man Who Came to a Village (El destino), by Miguel Pereira (Spain / Argentina)
  - Special mention - Goodbye Life (Shab bekheir farmandeh) by Ensieh Shah-Hosseini
- Europa Cinemas Label - Frozen City (Valkoinen kaupunki) by Aku Louhimies (Finland)
- Czech TV Award (Independent Camera): Play, by Alicia Scherson (Chile)
