= List of submissions to the 79th Academy Awards for Best Foreign Language Film =

2006 Best Foreign Language Film submissions
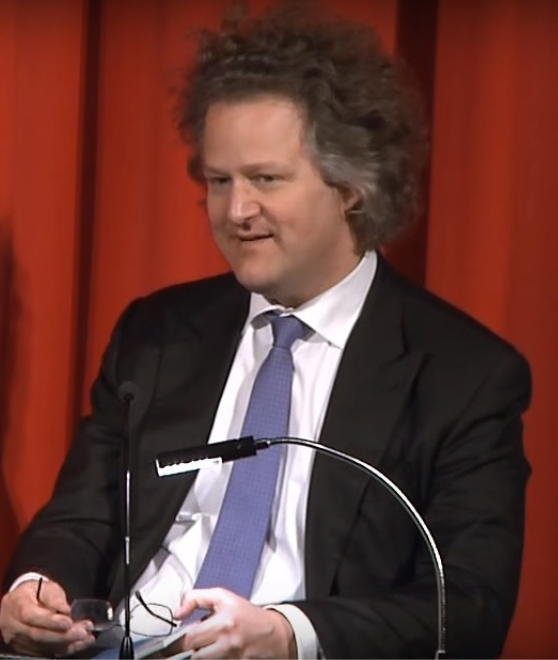
- Florian Henckel von Donnersmarck directed The Lives of Others, which won the year's award.

Highlights
- Oscar winner: (Germany) The Lives of Others
- Submissions: 63
- Debuts: 1
- Total eligible: 61

This is a list of submissions to the 79th Academy Awards for the Best Foreign Language Film. The Academy of Motion Picture Arts and Sciences (AMPAS) has invited the film industries of various countries to submit their best film for the Academy Award for Best Foreign Language Film every year since the award was created in 1956. The award is presented annually by the Academy to a feature-length motion picture produced outside the United States that contains primarily non-English dialogue. The Foreign Language Film Award Committee oversees the process and reviews all the submitted films.

Beginning with the 79th ceremony, rules were changed to the submission process instituting a two-step process in choosing the nominees for the award, where an initial committee selected a nine-film shortlist and a second committee narrowed it to five nominees. Additionally, the rule requiring submissions to be in an official language of the submitting country was also removed.

For the 79th Academy Awards, the submitted motion pictures must have first been released theatrically in their respective countries between 1 October 2005 and 30 September 2006. The deadline for submissions to the Academy was 2 October 2006. 63 countries submitted films, and 61 were found to be eligible by AMPAS and screened for voters. Lithuania submitted a film for the first time. After the 9-film shortlist was announced on 16 January 2007, the five nominees were announced on 23 January 2007.

Germany won the award for the third time with The Lives of Others by Florian Henckel von Donnersmarck.

== Submissions ==
Submitting country	Film title used in nomination	Original title	Language(s)	Director(s)	Result
Algeria	Days of Glory	Indigènes / بلديون	Arabic, French	Rachid Bouchareb	Nominated
Argentina	Family Law	Derecho de familia	Spanish, Hebrew	Daniel Burman	Not nominated
Australia	Ten Canoes		Ganalbiŋu, Mandjalpiŋu, English	Rolf de Heer	Not nominated
Austria	You Bet Your Life	Spiele Leben	German	Antonin Svoboda	Not nominated
Bangladesh	Forever Flows	নিরন্তর	Bengali	Abu Sayeed	Not nominated
Belgium	Someone Else's Happiness	Een ander zijn geluk	Dutch	Fien Troch	Not nominated
Bolivia	American Visa		Spanish	Juan Carlos Valdivia	Not nominated
Bosnia and Herzegovina	Grbavica: Land of My Dreams	Grbavica	Bosnian	Jasmila Žbanić	Not nominated
Brazil	Cinema, Aspirins and Vultures	Cinema, Aspirinas e Urubus	German, Brazilian Portuguese	Marcelo Gomes	Not nominated
Bulgaria	Monkeys in Winter	Маймуни през зимата	Bulgarian, French	Milena Andonova	Not nominated
Canada	Water	जल	Hindi, Sanskrit, English	Deepa Mehta	Nominated
Chile	In Bed	En la cama	Spanish	Matías Bize	Not nominated
China	Curse of the Golden Flower	满城尽带黄金甲	Mandarin	Zhang Yimou	Not nominated
Colombia	A Ton of Luck	Soñar no cuesta nada	Spanish	Rodrigo Triana	Not nominated
Croatia	Libertas		Croatian, Venetian, Italian	Veljko Bulajić	Not nominated
Cuba	El Benny		Spanish	Jorge Luis Sánchez	Not nominated
Czech Republic	Lunacy	Šílení	Czech	Jan Švankmajer	Not nominated
Denmark	After the Wedding	Efter brylluppet	Danish, Hindi, Swedish, English	Susanne Bier	Nominated
Egypt	The Yacoubian Building	عمارة يعقوبيان	Arabic, French	Marwan Hamed	Not nominated
Finland	Lights in the Dusk	Laitakaupungin valot	Finnish, Russian	Aki Kaurismäki	Withdrawn
France	Avenue Montaigne	Fauteuils d'orchestre	French, English, Japanese	Danièle Thompson	Made shortlist
Germany	The Lives of Others	Das Leben der Anderen	German	Florian Henckel von Donnersmarck	Won Academy Award
Greece	Chariton's Choir	Η χορωδία του Χαρίτωνα	Greek	Grigoris Karantinakis	Not nominated
Hong Kong	The Banquet	夜宴	Mandarin	Feng Xiaogang	Not nominated
Hungary	White Palms	Fehér tenyér	Hungarian, Russian, English	Szabolcs Hajdu	Not nominated
Iceland	Children	Börn	Icelandic	Ragnar Bragason	Not nominated
India	Rang De Basanti	रंग दे बसंती	Hindi, Punjabi, English, Urdu	Rakeysh Omprakash Mehra	Not nominated
Indonesia	Love for Share	Berbagi Suami	Indonesian	Nia Dinata	Not nominated
Iran	Café Transit	کافه ترانزیت	Persian, Greek, Turkish, Azerbaijani, Russian	Kambuzia Partovi	Not nominated
Iraq	Dreams	أحلام	Arabic	Mohamed al-Daradji	Not nominated
Israel	Sweet Mud	אדמה משוגעת	Hebrew, French	Dror Shaul	Not nominated
Italy	The Golden Door	Nuovomondo	Italian, English, Sicilian	Emanuele Crialese	Not nominated
Japan	Hula Girls	フラガール	Fukushima Japanese, Japanese	Lee Sang-il	Not nominated
Kazakhstan	Nomad	Көшпенділер / Кочевник	Russian, Kazakh	Sergei Bodrov, Talgat Temenov, and Ivan Passer	Not nominated
Kyrgyzstan	The Wedding Chest	Сундук предков	French, Kyrgyz, Russian	Nurbek Egen	Not nominated
Lebanon	Bosta	بوسطة / L'autobus	Arabic	Philippe Aractingi	Not nominated
Lithuania	Before Flying Back to the Earth	Prieš parskrendant į žemę	Lithuanian	Arūnas Matelis	Not nominated
Luxembourg	Your Name is Justine	Masz na imię Justine	Polish, German, English	Franco de Peña	Disqualified
Macedonia	Kontakt	Контакт	German, Macedonian	Sergej Stanojkovski	Not nominated
Mexico	Pan's Labyrinth	El laberinto del fauno	Spanish	Guillermo del Toro	Nominated
Morocco	The Moroccan Symphony	السمفونية المغربية / La symphonie marocaine	Arabic, French	Kamal Kamal	Not nominated
Nepal	Basain	बसाइँ	Nepali	Subash Gajurel	Not nominated
Netherlands	Black Book	Zwartboek	Dutch, German, English, Hebrew	Paul Verhoeven	Made shortlist
Norway	Reprise		Norwegian	Joachim Trier	Not nominated
Peru	Madeinusa		Spanish, Ayacucho Quechua	Claudia Llosa	Not nominated
Philippines	The Blossoming of Maximo Oliveros	Ang Pagdadalaga ni Maximo Oliveros	Filipino, English	Auraeus Solito	Not nominated
Poland	Retrieval	Z odzysku	Polish, Russian, Ukrainian	Slawomir Fabicki	Not nominated
Portugal	Alice		Portuguese	Marco Martins	Not nominated
Puerto Rico	Thieves and Liars	Ladrones y mentirosos	Spanish	Ricardo Méndez Matta	Not nominated
Romania	The Way I Spent the End of the World	Cum mi-am petrecut sfârșitul lumii	Romanian	Catalin Mitulescu	Not nominated
Russia	9th Company	9 рота	Russian	Fyodor Bondarchuk	Not nominated
Serbia	Tomorrow Morning	Сутра ујутру	Serbian	Oleg Novković	Not nominated
Slovenia	Gravehopping	Odgrobadogroba	Slovene	Jan Cvitkovič	Not nominated
South Korea	King and the Clown	왕의 남자	Korean	Lee Joon-ik	Not nominated
Spain	Volver		Spanish	Pedro Almodóvar	Made shortlist
Sweden	Falkenberg Farewell	Farväl Falkenberg	Halländska	Jesper Ganslandt	Not nominated
Switzerland	Vitus		Swiss German, English	Fredi Murer	Made shortlist
Taiwan	Blue Cha Cha	深海	Mandarin, Taiwanese Hokkien	Cheng Wen-tang	Not nominated
Thailand	Ahimsa: Stop to Run	อหิงสา จิ๊กโก๋ มีกรรม	Thai	Kittikorn Liasirikun	Not nominated
Turkey	Ice Cream, I Scream	Dondurmam Gaymak	Turkish	Yüksel Aksu	Not nominated
Ukraine	Aurora	Аврора	Russian, Ukrainian, English	Oxana Bayrak	Not nominated
Venezuela	Maroa		Spanish	Solveig Hoogesteijn	Not nominated
Vietnam	Story of Pao	Chuyện của Pao	Vietnamese	Ngô Quang Hải	Not nominated

== Notes ==
- Finland submitted Lights in the Dusk by Aki Kaurismäki, but it was ejected before the formal review process because Kaurismäki withdrew the film from consideration.
- Luxembourg submitted Your Name is Justine by Franco de Peña, but it was rejected before the formal review process because the Academy determined that not enough creative input was received from within Luxembourg for the film to meet the Academy's requirements.
