= 45th Karlovy Vary International Film Festival =

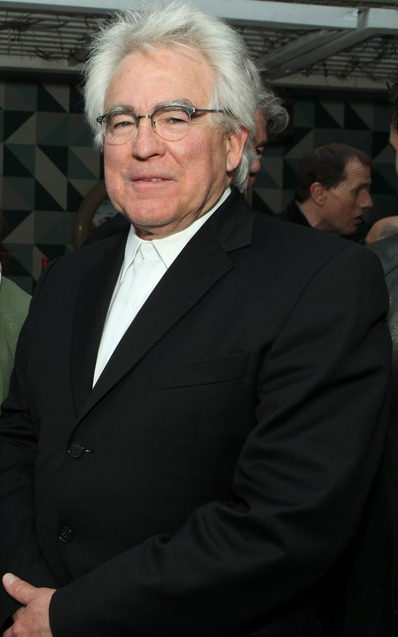
Ron Yerxa, Grand Jury President

The 45th Karlovy Vary International Film Festival took place from 2 to 10 July 2010. The Crystal Globe was won by The Mosquito Net, a Spanish drama film directed by Agustí Vila. The second prize, the Special Jury Prize was won by Kooky, a Czech action comedy film directed by Jan Svěrák. American film producer Ron Yerxa was the Grand Jury President of the festival.

== Juries ==
The following people formed the juries of the festival:

Main competition

- Ron Yerxa, Grand Jury President (USA)
- Mirjana Karanović (Serbia)
- Lee Chang-dong (South Korea)
- Lola Mayo (Spain)
- Alexei Popogrebsky (Russia)
- Bohdan Sláma (Czech Republic)
- David Stratton (Australia)

Documentaries

- Heino Deckert, Chairman (Germany)
- Ronald Bergan (United Kingdom)
- Rebecca Cammisa (USA)
- Alena Činčerová (Czech Republic)
- Dimitris Kerkinos (Greece)

East of the West

- Marion Döring, Chairwoman of the Jury (Germany
- Mihai Chirilov (Romania)
- Peter Nágel (Slovakia)
- Susanna Nicchiarelli (Italy)
- George Ovashvili (Georgia)

== Official selection awards ==
The following feature films and people received the official selection awards:

- Crystal Globe (Grand Prix) - The Mosquito Net (La mosquitera) by Agustí Vila (Spain)
- Special Jury Prize - Kooky by Jan Svěrák (Czech Republic, Denmark)
- Best Director Award - Rajko Grlić for Just Between Us (Neka ostane medju nama) (Croatia, Serbia, Slovenia)
- Best Actress Award - Anaïs Demoustier for Sweet Evil (L'enfance du mal) (France)
- Best Actor Award (ex aequo): Mateusz Kościukiewicz & Filip Garbacz, both for Mother Teresa of Cats (Matka Teresa od kotów) (Poland)
- Special mention of the jury - Another Sky (Drugoje něbo) by Dmitri Mamulia (Russia) & There Are Things You Don’t Know (Chiz-haie hast keh nemidani) by Fardin Saheb-Zamani
Official selection award winners

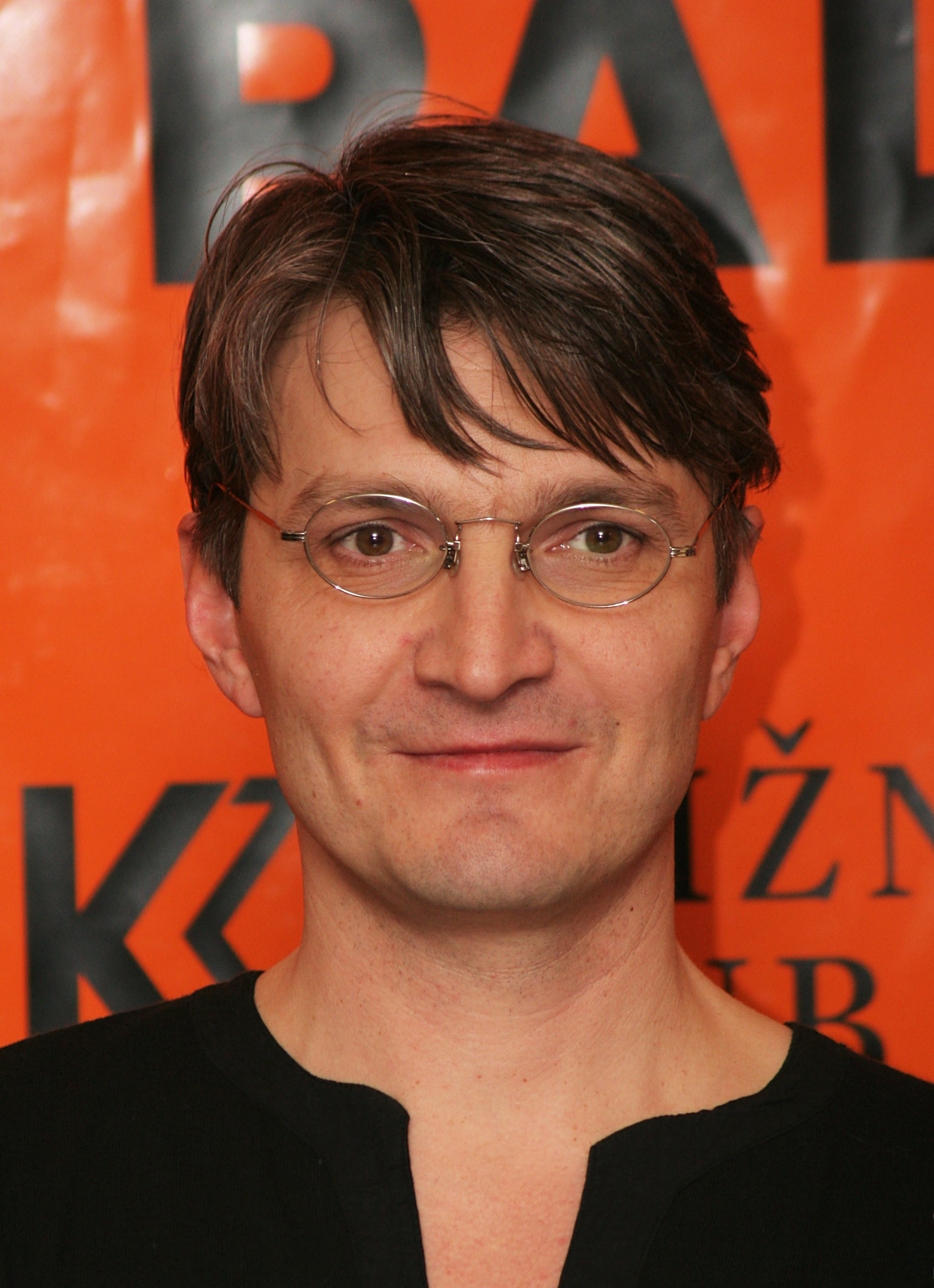
Jan Svěrák, director of Kooky

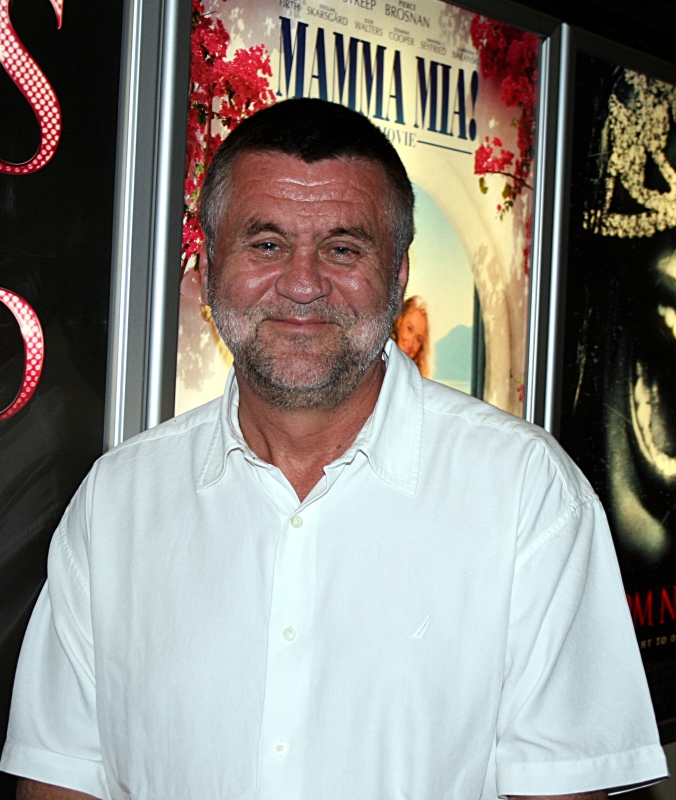
Rajko Grlić, Best Director

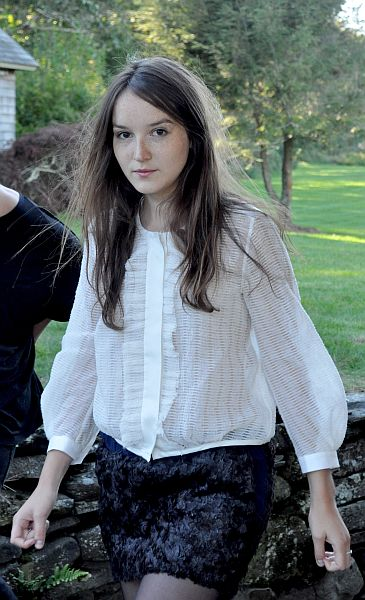
Anaïs Demoustier, Best Actress

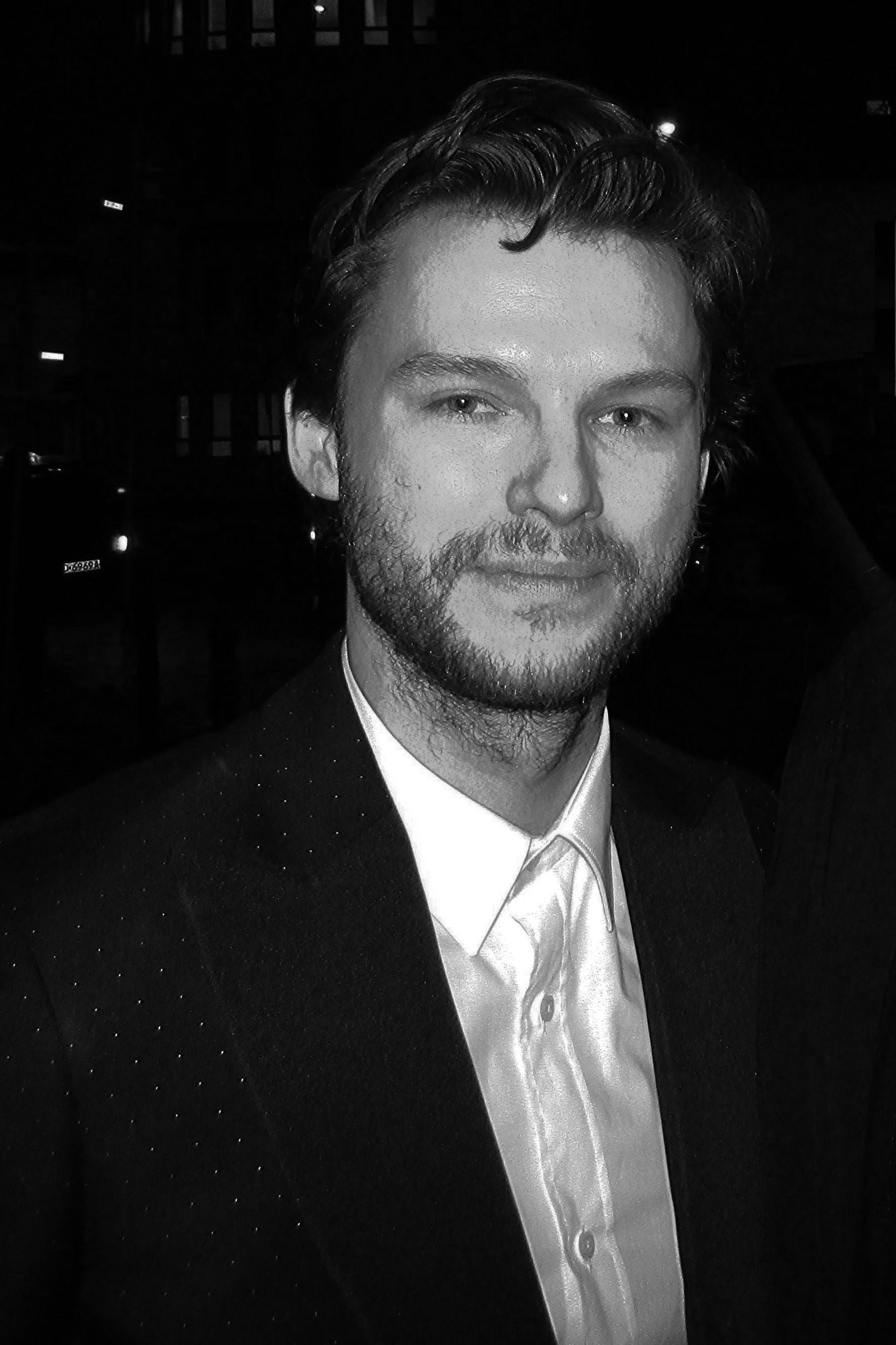
Mateusz Kościukiewicz, Best Actor

== Other statutory awards ==
Other statutory awards that were conferred at the festival:

- Best documentary film (over 30 min) - Familia by Mikael Wiström & Alberto Herskovits (Sweden)
  - Special Mention - Tinar by Mahdi Moniri (Iran)
- Best documentary film (under 30 min) - The River (Upe) by Julia Gruodienė & Rimantas Gruodis (Lithuania)
- East of the West Award - Aurora by Cristi Puiu (Romania, France, Switzerland, Germany)
  - Special Mention - The Temptation of St. Tony (Püha Tõnu kiusamine) by Veiko Õunpuu (Estonia, Sweden, Finland)
- Crystal Globe for Outstanding Artistic Contribution to World Cinema - Nikita Mikhalkov (Russia), Juraj Herz (Czech Republic)
- Festival President's Award - Jude Law (United Kingdom)
- Právo Audience Award - Oldboys by Nikolaj Steen (Denmark)

== Non-statutory awards ==
The following non-statutory awards were conferred at the festival:

- FIPRESCI International Critics Award: Hitler in Hollywood (Hitler à Hollywood) by Frédéric Sojcher (Belgium, France, Italy)
- Ecumenical Jury Award: Another Sky (Drugoje něbo) by Dmitri Mamulia (Russia)
- Don Quixote Award: The Mosquito Net (La mosquitera) by Agustí Vila (Spain)
- Europa Cinemas Label: Just Between Us (Neka ostane medju nama) by Rajko Grlić (Croatia, Serbia, Slovenia)
- Czech TV Award - Independent Camera: Four Lions by Chris Morris (satirist) (UK)
- NETPAC Award (ex aequo): Son of Babylon by Mohamed Al-Daradji (Iraq, UK, France, Netherlands, Palestine, UAE, Egypt) & The Orion (Orion) by Zamani Esmati (Iran)
