= 44th Karlovy Vary International Film Festival =

2009 edition of the international film festival

The 44th Karlovy Vary International Film Festival took place from 3 to 11 July 2009. The Crystal Globe was won by Angel at Sea, a Belgian-Canadian drama film directed by Frédéric Dumont. The second prize, the Special Jury Prize was won by Twenty, an Iranian drama film directed by Abdolreza Kahani.

== Juries ==
The following people formed the juries of the festival:

Main competition

- Claudie Ossard, Grand Jury President (France)
- Maria Bonnevie (Sweden)
- Sergey Dvortsevoy (Russia)
- Niki Karimi (Iran)
- Rodrigo Plá (Mexico)
- Kenneth Turan (USA)
- Ivan Zachariáš (Czech Republic)

Documentaries

- György Báron, Chairman (Hungary)
- David Courier (USA)
- Tiziana Finzi (Italy)
- Vít Janeček (Czech Republic)
- Jiska Rickels (The Netherlands)

East of the West

- Bojidar Manov, Chairman (Bulgaria)
- Birgit Beumers (Germany)
- Maria Procházková (Czech Republic)
- Jānis Putniņš (Latvia)
- Michael Wellner-Pospíšil (Czech Republic, France)

== Official selection awards ==
The following feature films and people received the official selection awards:

- Crystal Globe (Grand Prix) - Angel at Sea (Un ange à la mer) by Frédéric Dumont (Belgium)
- Special Jury Prize - Twenty (Bist) by Abdolreza Kahani (Iran)
- Best Director Award - Andreas Dresen for Whiskey with Vodka (Whisky mit Wodka) (Germany)
- Best Actress Award - Paprika Steen for Applause (Applaus) (Denmark)
- Best Actor Award (ex aequo):
  - Olivier Gourmet for Angel at Sea (Un ange à la mer) (Belgium, Canada)
  - Paul Giamatti for Cold Souls (USA)
- Special mention of the jury - Filip Garbacz for his role in Piggies (Świnki) (Poland, Germany)
Official selection award winners

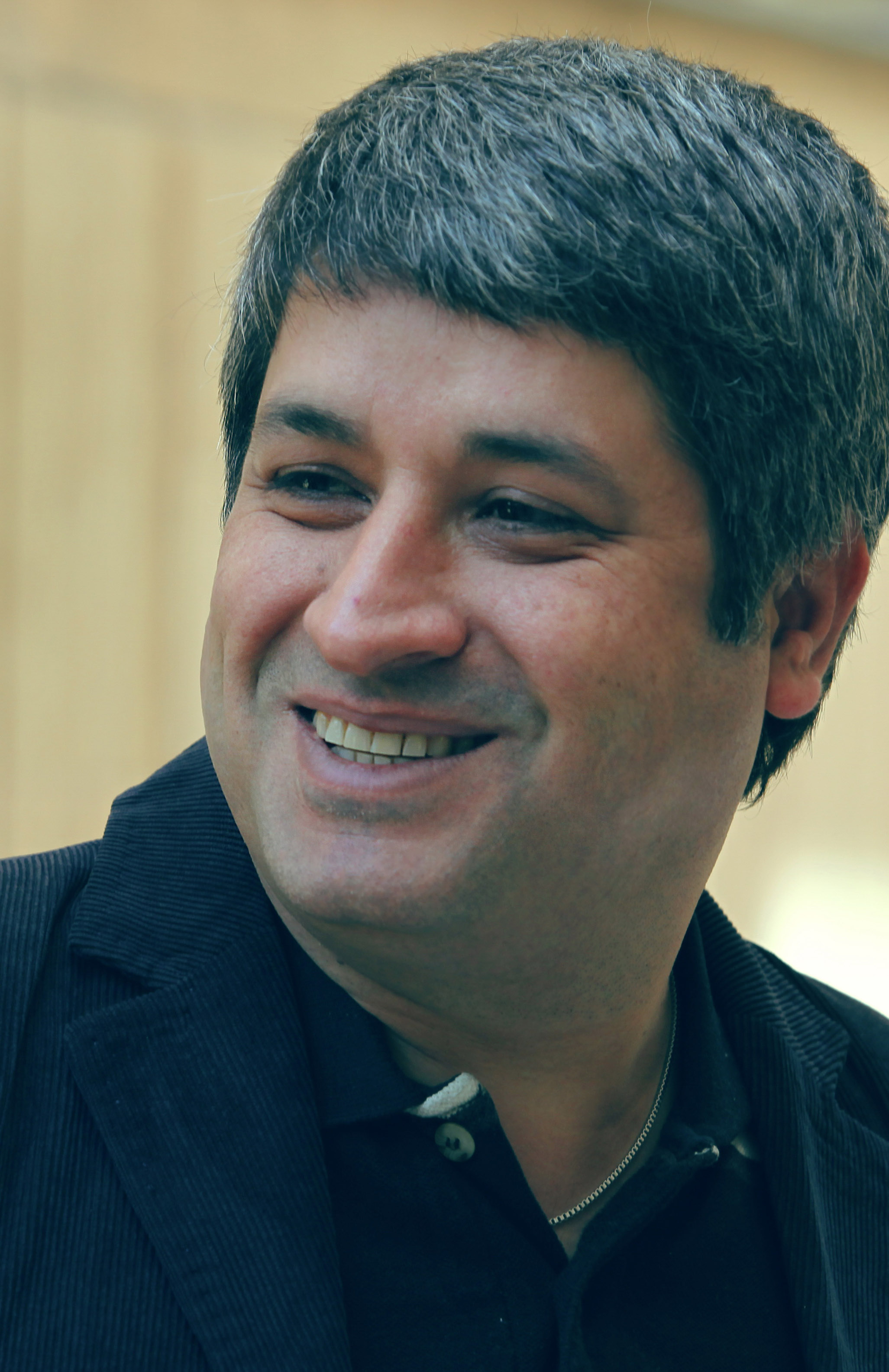
Abdolreza Kahani, director of Twenty

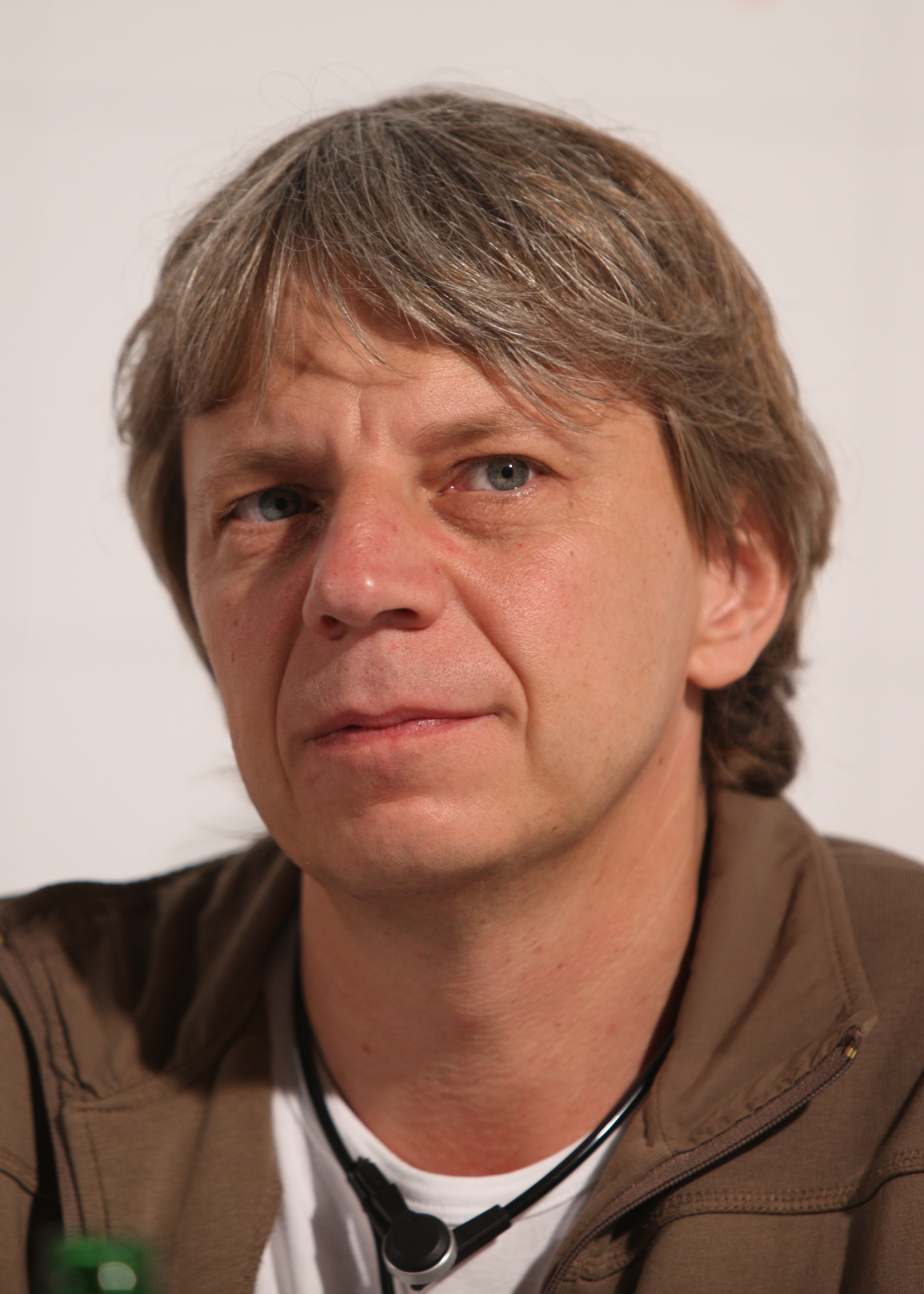
Andreas Dresen, Best Director

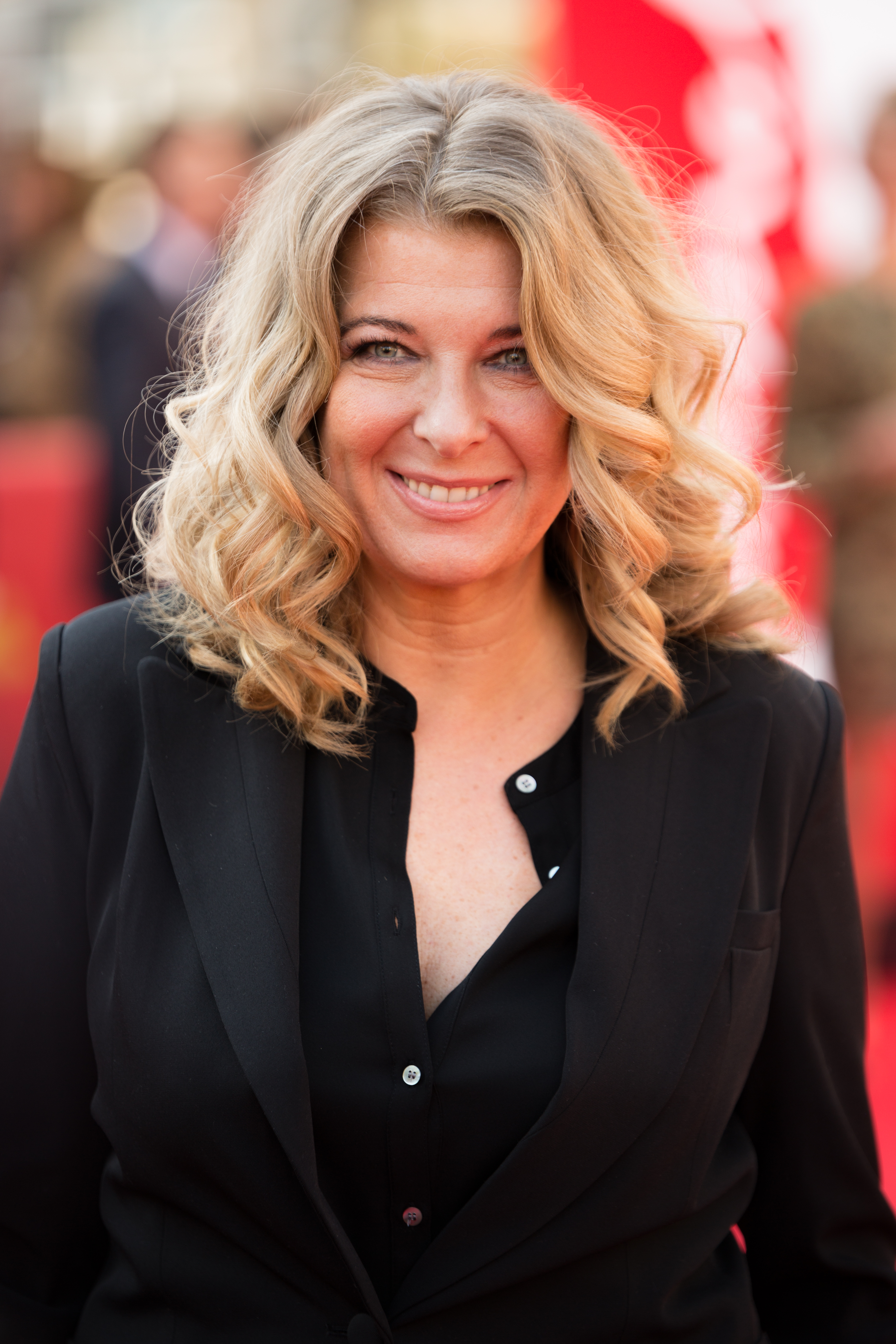
Paprika Steen, Best Actress

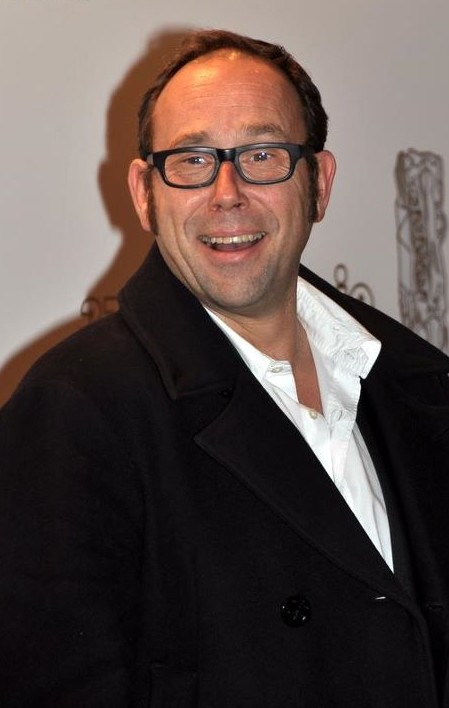
Olivier Gourmet, Best Actor (tie)

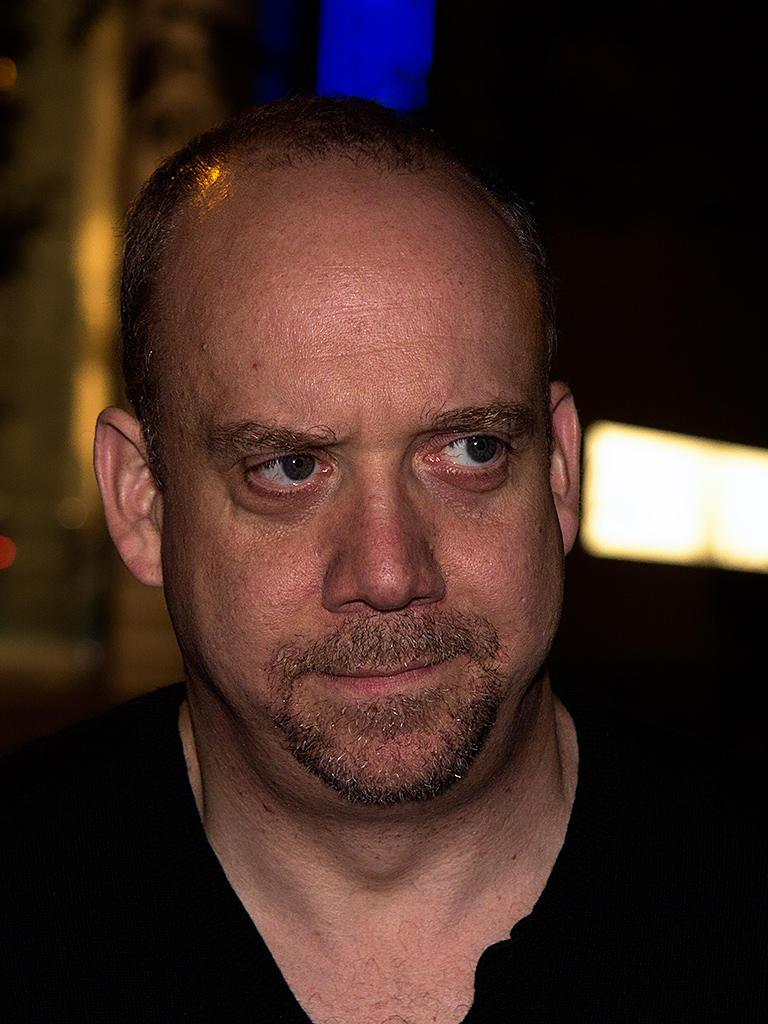
Paul Giamatti, Best Actor (tie)

== Other statutory awards ==
Other statutory awards that were conferred at the festival:

- Best documentary film (over 30 min) - Osadné by Marko Škop (Slovak Republic, Czech Republic)
  - Special mention - We Live in Public by Ondi Timoner (USA)
- Best documentary film (under 30 min) - Wagah by Supriyo Sen (Germany, India, Pakistan)
  - Special mention - Till It Hurts by Marcin Koszałka (Poland)
- East of the West Award - Room and a Half (Poltory komnaty ili sentimentalnoje putěšestvije na rodinu) by Andrei Khrzhanovsky (Russia)
  - Special Mention - Scratch by Michał Rosa (Poland)
- Crystal Globe for Outstanding Artistic Contribution to World Cinema - Isabelle Huppert (France), John Malkovich (USA), Jan Švankmajer (Czech Republic)
- Festival President's Award - Antonio Banderas (USA)
- Právo Audience Award - A Matter of Size (Sipur Gadol) by Erez Tadmor & Sharon Maymon (Israel, Germany, France)

== Non-statutory awards ==
The following non-statutory awards were conferred at the festival:

- FIPRESCI International Critics Award: Will Not Stop There (Nije kraj) by Vinko Brešan (Croatia, Serbia)
- Ecumenical Jury Award: Twenty (Bist) by Abdolreza Kahani (Iran)
- Don Quixote Award: Angel at Sea (Un ange à la mer) by Frédéric Dumont (Belgium)
  - Special Mention: Wolfy (Volchok) by Vassily Sigarev (Russia) & Cold Souls by Sophie Barthes (USA)
- Europa Cinemas Label: Applause (Applaus) by Martin Pieter Zandvliet (Denmark)
- Czech TV Award - Independent Camera: Eamon by Margaret Corkery (Ireland)
  - Special Mention: La Tigra, Chaco by Federico Godfrid & Juan Sasiaín (Argentina)
- NETPAC Award: Breathless by Yang Ik-june (South Korea)
