= 51st Karlovy Vary International Film Festival =

2016 film festival edition

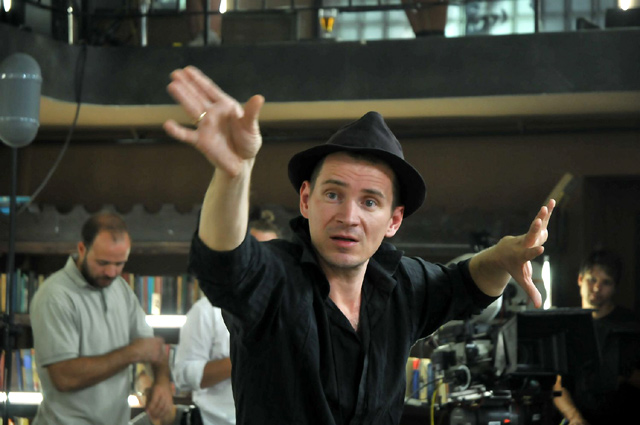
Szabolcs Hajdu, director of It's Not the Time of My Life

The 51st Karlovy Vary International Film Festival took place from 1 to 9 July 2016. The Crystal Globe was won by It's Not the Time of My Life, a Hungarian drama film directed by Szabolcs Hajdu. The second prize, the Special Jury Prize, was won by Zoology, a Russian drama film directed by Ivan I. Tverdovskiy.

== Juries ==
The following people formed the juries of the festival:

Main competition

- Maurizio Braucci (Italy)
- Eve Gabereau (United Kingdom)
- Martha Issová (Czech Republic)
- George Ovashvili (Georgia)
- Jay Van Hoy (USA)

Documentaries

- Sigrid Jonsson Dyekjær (Denmark)
- Hana Kulhánková (Czech Republic)
- Laurent Bécue-Renard (France)

East of the West

- Carmen Gray (United Kingdom)
- Tolga Karaçelik (Turkey)
- Mikuláš Novotný (Czech Republic)
- Agnieszka Smoczyńska (Poland)
- Yoshi Yatabe (Japan)

== Official selection awards ==
The following feature films and people received the official selection awards:

- Crystal Globe (Grand Prix) - It's Not the Time of My Life (Ernelláék Farkasékná) by Szabolcs Hajdu (Hungary)
- Special Jury Prize - Zoology (Zoologiya) by Ivan I. Tverdovskiy (Russia, France, Germany)
- Best Director Award - Damjan Kozole for Nightlife (Nočno življenje) (Slovenia, Macedonia, Bosnia and Herzegovina)
- Best Actress Award - Zuzana Mauréry for her role in The Teacher (Učiteľka) (Slovak Republic, Czech Republic)
- Best Actor Award - Szabolcs Hajdu for his role in It's Not the Time of My Life (Ernelláék Farkaséknál) (Hungary)
- Special Jury Mention - By the Rails (Dincolo de calea ferata) by Cătălin Mitulescu (Romania, Sweden) & The Wolf from Royal Vineyard Street (Vlk z Královských Vinohrad) by Jan Němec (Czech Republic, Slovak Republic, France)

== Other statutory awards ==
Other statutory awards that were conferred at the festival:

- Best documentary film - LoveTrue by Alma Har'el (USA)
  - Special Mention - Ama-San by Cláudia Varejão (Portugal, Switzerland, Japan)
- East of the West Award - House of Others (Skhvisi sakhli) by Rusudan Glurjidze (Georgia, Russia, Spain, Croatia)
  - Special Jury Prize - The Days That Confused (Päevad, mis ajasid segadusse) by Triin Ruumet (Estonia)
- Forum of Independents Award - Tangerine by Sean Baker (USA)
- Crystal Globe for Outstanding Artistic Contribution to World Cinema - Willem Dafoe (USA)
- Festival President's Award - Jean Reno (France) & Charlie Kaufman (USA)
- Festival President's Award for Contribution to Czech Cinematography -Jiřina Bohdalová (Czech Republic)
- Právo Audience Award - Captain Fantastic by Matt Ross (USA)

== Non-statutory awards ==
The following non-statutory awards were conferred at the festival:

- FIPRESCI International Critics Award: Original Bliss (Gleißendes Glück) by Sven Taddicken (Germany)
- Ecumenical Jury Award: The Confessions (Le confessioni) by Roberto Andò (Italy, France)
- FEDEORA Award (East of the West section): Collector (Kollektor) by Alexei Krasovskiy (Russia)
- Europa Cinemas Label: Original Bliss (Gleißendes Glück) by Sven Taddicken (Germany)
