= Opus Film =

Polish film production company

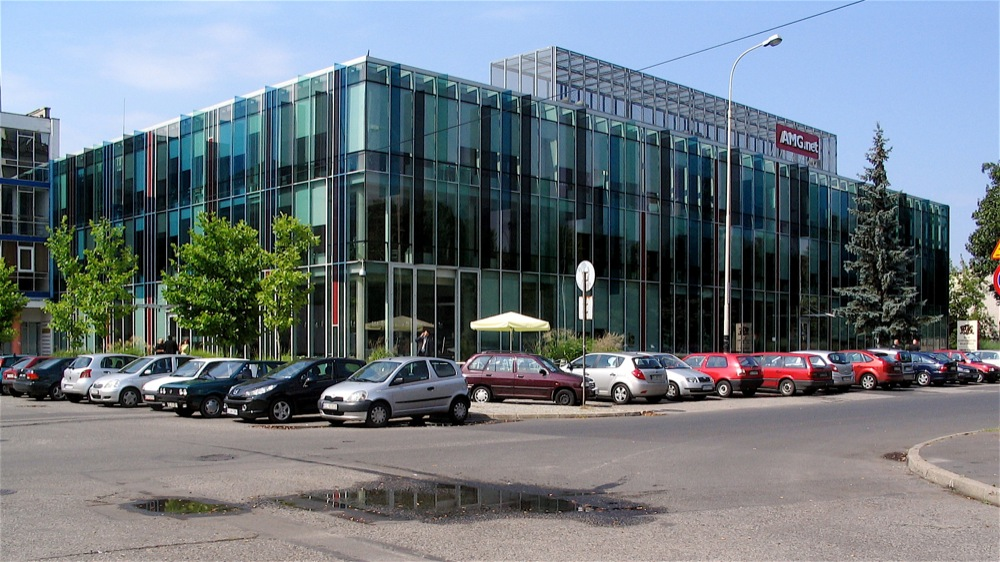
- Founded: 1991; 35 years ago
- Founder: Piotr Dzięcioł
- Headquarters: Łódź, Poland
- Products: Films; Television series
- Website: opusfilm.com

Opus Film is a Polish film production company based in Łódź. It was founded by Piotr Dzięcioł in 1991.

== History ==
Opus Film was founded by Piotr Dzięcioł in 1991. Few Polish films were being made in the 1990s, so the company initially only produced commercials. After achieving financial success in the advertising industry, the company bought land from the Łódź Feature Film Studio and produced Piotr Trzaskalski's debut feature film, Edi, which premiered in 2002.

The company co-produced Paweł Pawlikowski's Ida (2013), which won the Academy Award for Best Foreign Language Film in 2015.

== Filmography ==
=== Film ===
Year	Title	Director	Ref.
2002	Edi	Piotr Trzaskalski	
2005	Your Name Is Justine	Franco de Peña	
2005	The Master	Piotr Trzaskalski	
2006	Hi way	Jacek Borusiński	
2006	Retrieval	Sławomir Fabicki	
2006	The Boy on the Galloping Horse	Adam Guziński	
2007	Aleja gówniarzy	Piotr Szczepański	
2007	Tricks	Andrzej Jakimowski	
2007	Spring 1941	Uri Barbash	
2007	The Loneliness of the Short-Order Cook	Marcel Sawicki	
2008	Lekcje pana Kuki	Dariusz Gajewski	
2009	My Flesh, My Blood	Marcin Wrona	
2009	Zero	Paweł Borowski	
2010	Wonderful Summer	Ryszard Brylski	
2010	King of Devil's Island	Marius Holst	
2010	Nie ten człowiek	Paweł Wendorff	
2011	The Mill and the Cross	Lech Majewski	
2011	Courage	Grzegorz Zgliński	
2012	Aglaja	Krisztina Deák	
2013	The Congress	Ari Folman	
2013	Ida	Paweł Pawlikowski	
2014	Obietnica	Anna Kazejak-Dawid	
2014	Powstanie Warszawskie	Jan Komasa	
2014	The Cut	Fatih Akin	
2014	Citizen	Jerzy Stuhr	
2015	The Here After	Magnus von Horn	
2016	Memories of Summer	Adam Guziński	
2016	Dark Crimes	Alexandros Avranas	
2017	November	Rainer Sarnet	
2017	Animals	Grzegorz Zgliński	
2017	The Captain	Robert Schwentke	
2017	Beyond Words	Urszula Antoniak	
2018	Cold War	Paweł Pawlikowski	
2019	I Am Lying Now	Paweł Borowski	
2019	The Taste of Pho	Mariko Bobrik	
2020	Sweat	Magnus von Horn	
2020	Dear Ones	Grzegorz Jaroszuk	
2021	Invincible	Tom Koliński	
2021	Anatomia	Aleksandra Jankowska	
2022	Fools	Tomasz Wasilewski	
2023	Feast of Fire	Kinga Dębska	

=== Television ===
Year	Title	Network	Ref.
2014–2015	Zbrodnia	AXN	
2017–present	Ultraviolet	AXN	
2018–2022	Raven	Canal+ Premium	
2021–present	Klangor	Canal+	
2022	Queen	Netflix	
2022	Pewnego razu na krajowej jedynce	Netflix	
2023–present	The Teacher	Canal+ Premium	
2024	Feedback	Netflix	
2024	Gra z Cieniem	TVP1	
