= White Palms =

White Palms may refer to:

- "White Palms", a song by Black Rebel Motorcycle Club from their 2001 album B.R.M.C.
- White Palms (film) (Fehér Tenyér), a 2006 Hungarian film by director Szabolcs Hajdu that played at the 2006 Toronto International Film Festival
