= Games of the Heart =

2001 film by Céline Baril

- French: Du pic au cœur
- Directed by: Céline Baril
- Written by: Céline Baril
- Produced by: Serge Noël; Céline Baril
- Starring: Peter Batakliev; Alexander Bisping; André Brassard
- Cinematography: Carlos Ferrand
- Edited by: Natalie Lamoureaux
- Music by: Jérôme Minière
- Release date: 9 February 2001
- Country: Canada
- Language: French

Games of the Heart (French: Du pic au cœur) is a Canadian drama film, directed by Céline Baril and released in 2001.

== Credits ==
- Directed by: Céline Baril
- Written by: Céline Baril
- Produced by: Serge Noël and Céline Baril
- Cinematography by: Carlos Ferrand
- Film Editing: Natalie Lamoureaux
- Music by: Jérôme Minière
- Sound Design by: Dominik Pagacz
- Sound Editing by: Dominik Pagacz

== Awards and nominations ==
=== Awards ===
- 2002: Rhode Island International Film Festival Best Foreign Film (Céline Baril)

=== Nominations ===
- 2002: Jutra Awards Best Cinematography (Carlos Ferrand)
