= Dominik Pagacz =

Canadian artist

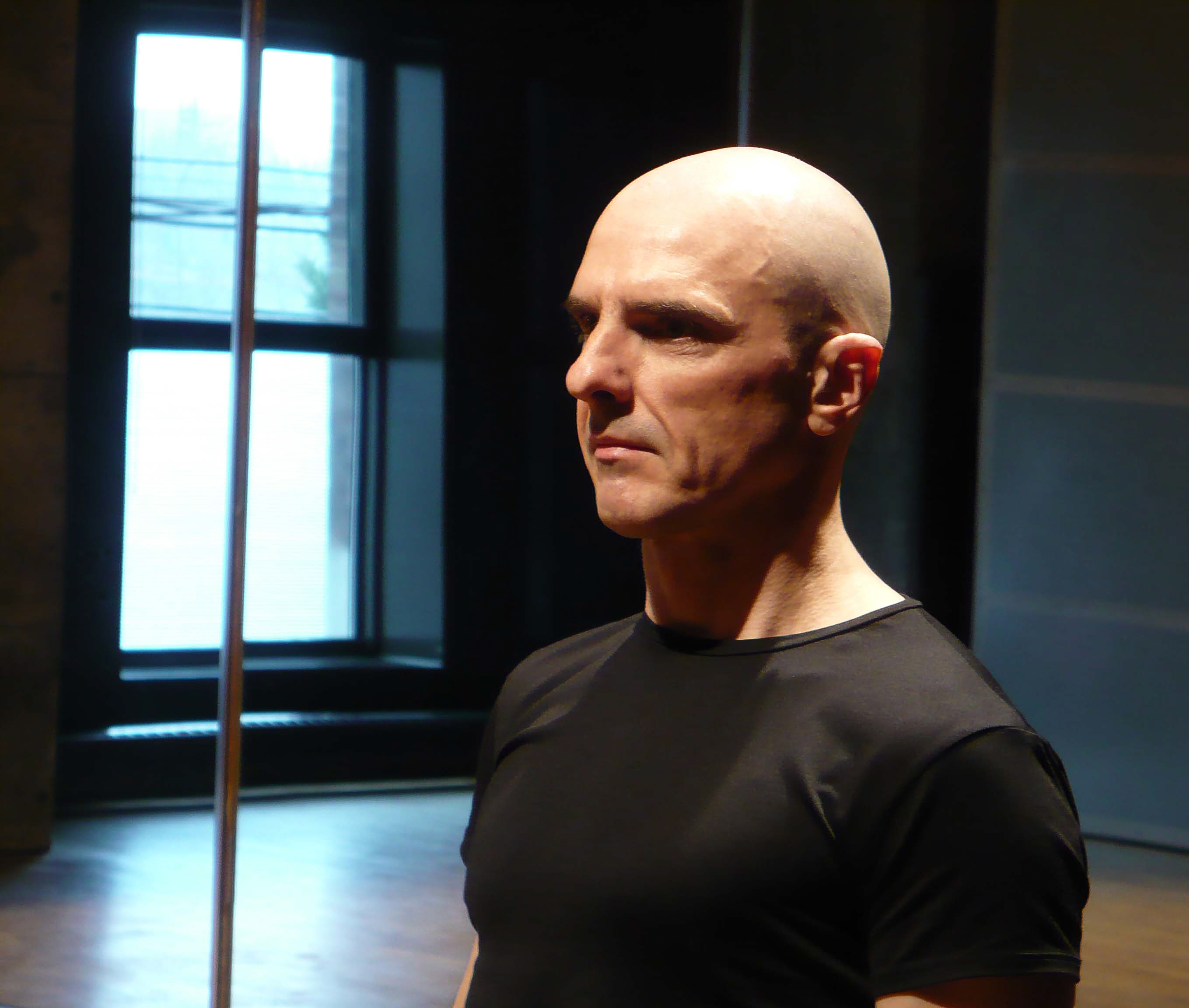
Dominik Pagacz, artistic director of Segment 3, Montreal, 2012

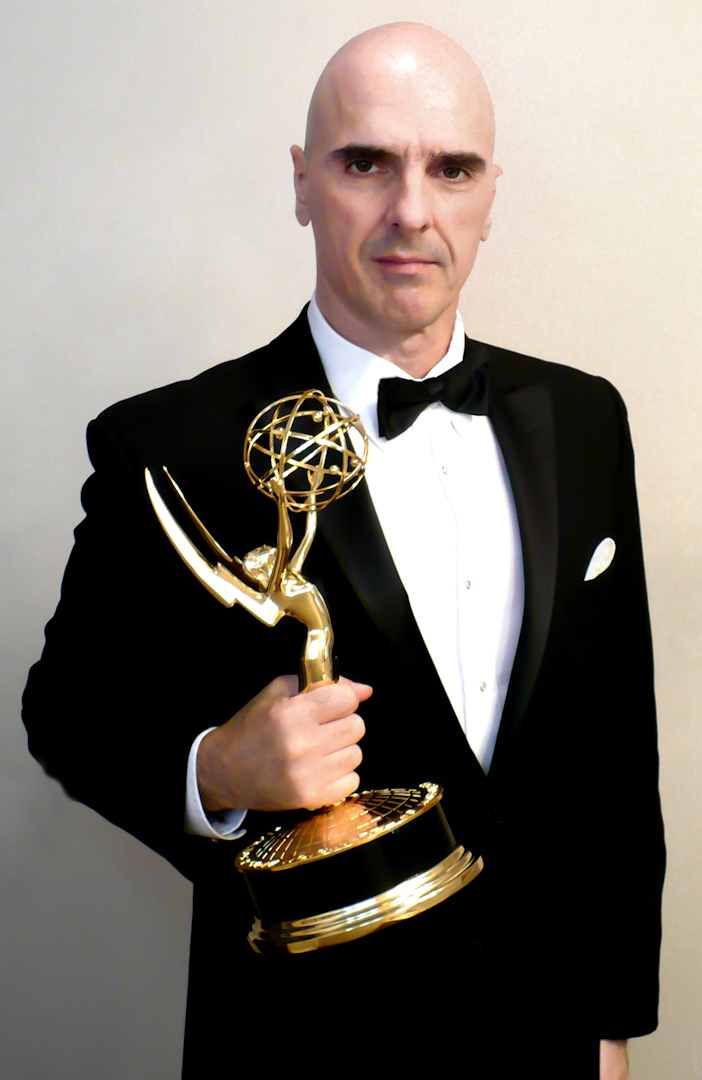
Dominik Pagacz at the 63rd Primetime Emmy Awards, 2011

Dominik Pagacz is a Canadian artist known mostly as an Emmy Award-winning motion picture supervising sound editor, sound effects editor, sound designer, sound re-recording mixer, actor and filmmaker.

He is a member of the Academy of Canadian Cinema and Television and of the Academy of Television Arts & Sciences (ATAS) (U.S.A.).

He is also the founding member and artistic director of the experimental theatre and film production company Segment 3.

== Filmography ==
- 1990 A Bullet in the Head
- 1992 La Fourmi et le volcan
- 1995 Hiroshima
- 1995 Bullet to Beijing
- 1996 Midnight in Saint Petersburg
- 1996 Omerta, la loi du silence
- 1996 Marguerite Volant
- 1996 The Ideal Man (L'Homme idéal)
- 1997 The Absent One (L'Absent)
- 1997 Stowaways (Clandestins)
- 1998 The Red Violin (Le Violon rouge)
- 1998 L'Ombre de l'épervier
- 1999 The Old Man and the Sea
- 1999 Gladys
- 2000 The Orphan Muses (Les Muses orphelines)
- 2001 Tar Angel (L'Ange de goudron)
- 2001 Games of the Heart (Du pic au cœur)
- 2001 A Girl at the Window (Une jeune fille à la fenêtre)
- 2002 Katryn's Place
- 2003 Seducing Doctor Lewis (La grande séduction)
- 2003 Music Hall
- 2003 Gisèle
- 2009 Angel at Sea (Un ange à la mer)
- 2010 The Pillars of the Earth

== Awards ==
=== Nominations and wins ===
- 2011: Emmy Awards – Winner – Outstanding Sound Editing for a Miniseries, Movie or Special — The Pillars of the Earth.
- 2010: Jutra Awards – Best Sound — Angel at Sea (Un ange à la mer)
- 2003: Gémeaux Awards – Best Sound — Music Hall
- 2002: Genie Awards – Best Achievement in Sound Editing — A Girl at the Window (Une jeune fille à la fenêtre)
- 2002: Jutra Awards – Best Sound — A Girl at the Window (Une jeune fille à la fenêtre)
- 2001: Jutra Awards – Best Sound — The Orphan Muses (Les Muses orphelines)
- 2000: Gémeaux Awards – Best Achievement in Overall Sound — L'Ombre de l'épervier
- 1998: Gémeaux Awards – Best Achievement in Overall Sound — L'Ombre de l'épervier
