= Sherry Baby =

Sherry Baby may refer to:

- "Sherry" (song), a song popularized by The Four Seasons which contains the lyrics "Sherry baby" in its chorus
- Sherrybaby, a 2006 film; its title is reminiscent of the song
