= Segment 3 =

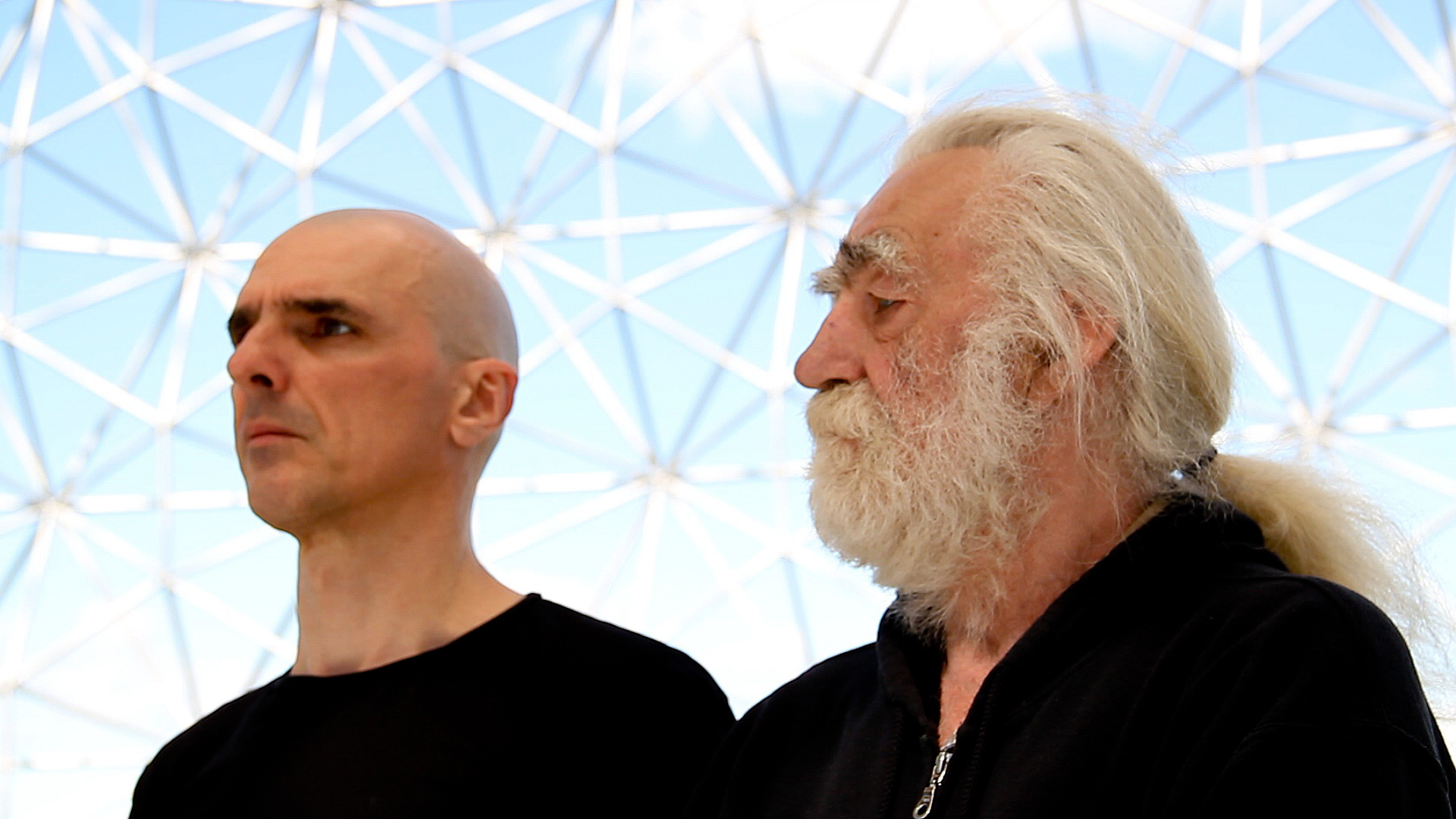
- Dominik Pagacz (Mephistopheles) and George Molnar (Faustus) in Faustus; incident 375. Segment 3, Montreal, 2013
- Founded: 2013; 13 years ago
- Founder: Dominik Pagacz
- Headquarters: Montreal, Quebec, Canada
- Website: segment3.com

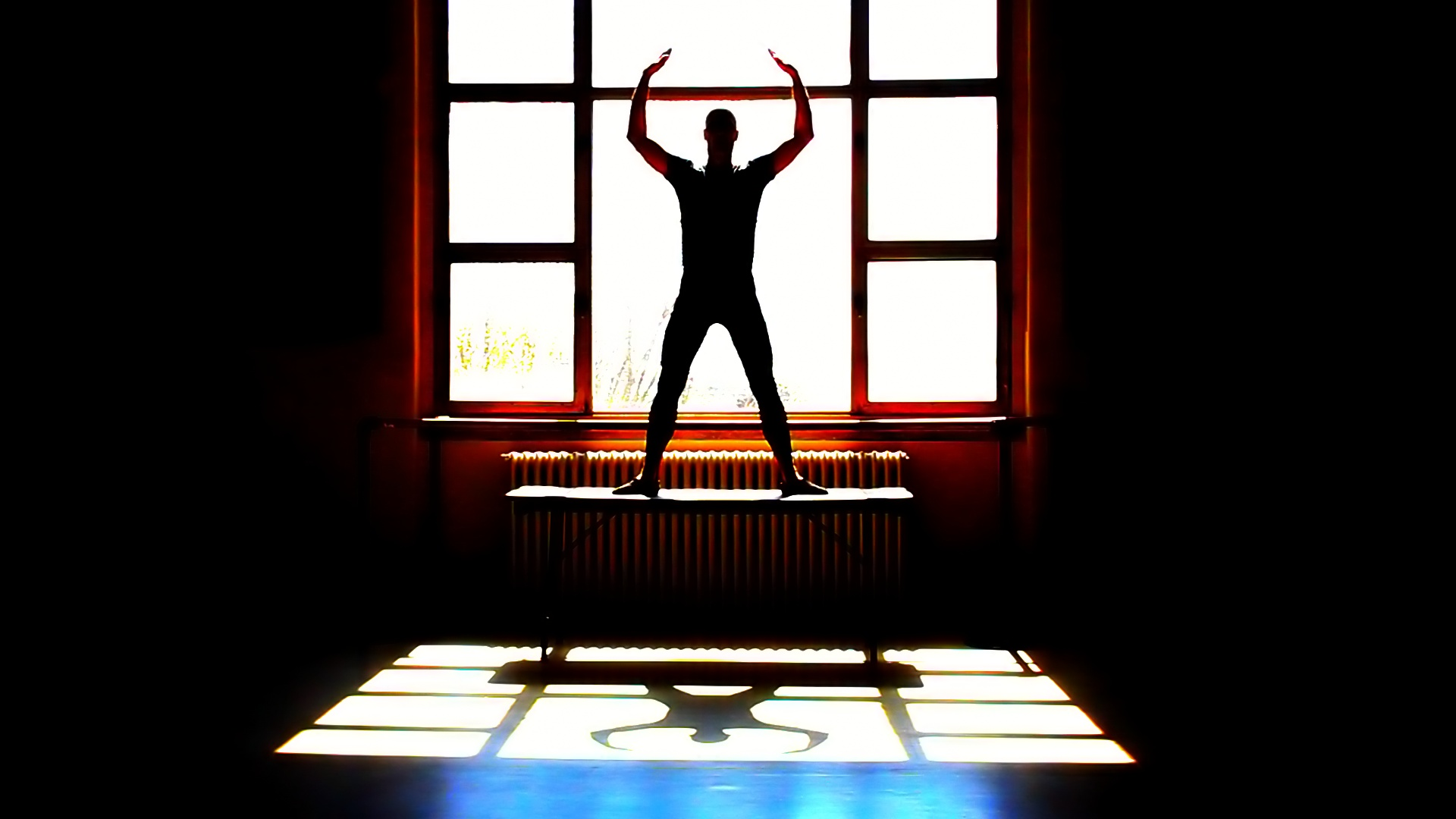
Dominik Pagacz in 3orthographies. Segment 3, Montreal, 2013.

Segment 3 is an experimental theatre and film production company based in Montreal, Canada, which has been active since early 2013. It was founded by Dominik Pagacz, a Canadian artist known mostly for his sound work on motion pictures.

== Theatro/Filmography ==
- 2013 Segment 3
- 2013 3hams
- 2013 Avec leur tact habituel
- 2013 3orthographies
- 2013 Like molten lead
- 2013 Their simple needs
- 2013 A hole in the desert
- 2013 To sleep
- 2013 Rawdon
- 2013 Faustus: incident #375
- 2013 goodboy
- 2013 Arabstrap
- 2013 Sir, replies Monsieur
- 2013 3rôles
- 2014 Quand il vous regarde
- 2014 Mercitronc!
- 2014 All the King's Horses
- 2015 Funestes oisances

== Selected screenings ==
In 2014, four works by Dominik Pagacz — All the King's Horses, Quand il vous regarde, Mercitronc! and Sir, Replies Monsieur — were presented as part of the Foco Canadá program at the 24th Curta Cinema – Festival Internacional de Curtas do Rio de Janeiro. The works were presented together in the Cela at the Centro Cultural Justiça Federal (CCJF) as an installation-format program.

Also in 2014, All the King's Horses was screened in the Midnight Madness program of the KLIK! Amsterdam Animation Festival at the EYE Film Institute Netherlands.

In 2015, Faustus: Incident #375 was presented in the Transmutations program at the Alchemy Film & Moving Image Festival in Hawick, Scotland, where it was identified as its United Kingdom premiere. Sir, Replies Monsieur was also screened at the 2015 Alchemy Film & Moving Image Festival.
