= Céline Baril =

Canadian artist and film director

Céline Baril (born 1953) is a Canadian artist and film director.

== Early life ==
Baril was born in Gentilly, Quebec. In 1982, she earned a Bachelor of Fine Arts in degree from the Université du Québec à Montréal.

== Career ==
Her film 24 Davids was selected as the opening film of the 20th Rencontres internationales du documentaire de Montréal.

Her work is included in the collections of the Musée national des beaux-arts du Québec, the Cinematheque quebecoise, and the National Film Board of Canada.

== Filmography ==
- Barcelone - 1989
- Le Fourmi et le volcan (The Ant and the Volcano) - 1992
- Le port des parfums - 1992
- The Absent One (L'Absent) - 1997
- Games of the Heart (Du pic au cœur) - 2000
- Giselle - 2003
- 538x La Vie (Life Times 538) - 2005
- The Theory of Everything (La théorie du tout) - 2009
- Room Tone - 2015
- 24 Davids - 2017

== See also ==
- List of female film and television directors
