= Mirage (2014 film) =

2014 Hungarian-Slovak drama film

- Film poster
- Directed by: Szabolcs Hajdu
- Written by: Szabolcs Hajdu
- Starring: Isaach De Bankolé
- Release dates: 5 September 2014 (TIFF); 13 November 2014 (Hungary)
- Running time: 90 minutes
- Countries: Hungary; Slovakia
- Language: Hungarian

Mirage (Hungarian: Délibáb) is a 2014 Hungarian-Slovak drama film directed by Szabolcs Hajdu. It was screened in the Contemporary World Cinema section at the 2014 Toronto International Film Festival.

== Cast ==
- Isaach De Bankolé as Francis
- Răzvan Vasilescu as Cisco
- Orsolya Török-Illyés as Anna
- Dragos Bucur as Kokas
- Tamás Polgár as Attila
