= Angel at Sea =

2009 film

- Theatrical release poster
- Directed by: Frédéric Dumont
- Written by: Bernard Bellefroid; David Lambert
- Produced by: Stéphane Lhoest; Barbara Shrier
- Starring: Martin Nissen; Anne Consigny; Olivier Gourmet
- Cinematography: Virginie Saint-Martin
- Edited by: Glenn Berman
- Music by: Luc Sicard
- Release dates: July 7, 2009 (KVIFF); February 3, 2010 (Belgium)
- Running time: 86 minutes
- Countries: Belgium; Canada
- Language: French

Angel at Sea (French: Un ange à la mer) is a 2009 drama film directed by Frédéric Dumont. The film follows Louis, a 12 year-old boy, who lives a happy life with his parents and older brother in southern Morocco. The pivotal moment in the film is when Louis' severely depressed father makes a shockingly candid confession to the boy. Louis then becomes a "guardian angel", obsessively watching over his father.

The film was first released at the 44th Karlovy Vary International Film Festival on 7 July 2009, where it won the Crystal Globe and the Best Actor Award for Olivier Gourmet.

At the 2010 Magritte Awards, it received two nominations in the category of Best Actor (Olivier Gourmet) and Most Promising Actor (Martin Nissen). It also received two Jutra Award nominations for Best Editing (Glenn Berman) and Best Sound (Dominik Pagacz, Gavin Fernandes) at the 12th Jutra Awards.
