= Bibliothèque Pascal =

2010 film

- Film poster
- Directed by: Szabolcs Hajdu
- Written by: Szabolcs Hajdu
- Starring: Orsolya Török-Illyés
- Cinematography: András Nagy
- Edited by: Péter Politzer
- Release date: 17 February 2010
- Running time: 105 minutes
- Country: Hungary
- Languages: Romanian, English, Hungarian

Bibliothèque Pascal is a 2010 Hungarian drama film written and directed by Szabolcs Hajdu. The film was selected as the Hungarian entry for the Best Foreign Language Film at the 83rd Academy Awards, but it did not make the final shortlist.

== Cast ==
- Orsolya Török-Illyés as Mona
- Andi Vasluianu as Viorel
- Shamgar Amram as Pascal
- Răzvan Vasilescu as Gigi Paparu
- Oana Pellea as Rodica Paparu
- Tibor Pálffy as Saxophone player
- Florin Piersic Jr. as Countryman
- Mihai Constantin as Gicu
- Orion Radies as Little boy
- Alexandru Bindea as Police chief
- Mihai Călin as Police officer

== See also ==
- List of submissions to the 83rd Academy Awards for Best Foreign Language Film
- List of Hungarian submissions for the Academy Award for Best Foreign Language Film
