= Your Name Is Justine =

Your Name is Justine
- Directed by: Franco de Peña
- Written by: Chris Burdza; Tomasz Kepski; Franco de Peña
- Produced by: Stéphan Carpiaux; Piotr Dzieciol; Wioletta Gradkowska; Ewa Puszczynska
- Starring: Anna Cieślak; Arno Frisch; Rafal Mackowiak; Mathieu Carrière; Dominique Pinon
- Cinematography: Arkadiusz Tomiak
- Edited by: Jarosław Kamiński
- Music by: Nikos Kypourgos
- Release dates: September 30, 2005 (Montreal World Film Festival); May 10, 2006 (Poland)
- Running time: 97 minutes
- Countries: Luxembourg, Poland
- Languages: Polish, German, English

Your Name is Justine (Polish: Masz na imię Justine) is a 2005 film directed by Franco de Peña. De Peña had originally wanted to produce the film in Germany, but when he was unable to garner enough funds, he came to Luxembourg. The film was co-produced by Luxembourg Hemisphere Films and Polish Opus Film, and shot primarily in Luxembourg with the aid of numerous local technicians. As a result of the multifaceted production, the dialogue of the movie is in English, German and Polish. The plot of the story revolves around a girl called Mariola (Anna Cieślak), who is forced into prostitution in Berlin, and attempts to hold on to her sense of self despite being exploited by those around her. The film was screened at the Montreal World Film Festival on August 30, 2005, where cinematographer Arkadiusz Tomiak won Best Artistic Contribution.

The film was Luxembourg's submission to the 79th Academy Awards for the Academy Award for Best Foreign Language Film. Although previous submissions (such as Italy's Private) had been rejected due to not being in the official language of the country, the academy removed the requirement for the 79th Academy Awards, allowing Your Name is Justine and other films such as Canada's Water (which contained only Hindi dialogue) to be submitted. However, the film was rejected by the Academy of Motion Picture Arts and Sciences before the formal review process. The academy determined that there was not enough creative contribution from Luxembourg to qualify under the academy's requirements, which stress that a "submitting country must certify that creative talent of that country exercised artistic control of the film." Joy Hoffman, the head of Luxembourg's foreign-language Oscar committee, was disappointed by the rejection. Although he accepted the notion that the film was a "borderline entry", he noted that "without Luxembourg the film wouldn't exist".

== Plot ==
While living with her grandmother in Poland, a young woman, Mariola (Anna Cieślak) falls in love. Her boyfriend, Artur (Rafal Mackowiak) is charming and suggests they travel around Europe and work here and there to pay for their trip. Unfortunately, Artur isn't as he seems and Mariola is sold as a prostitute when they cross over to Germany. We follow her ordeal as she tries to free herself and to stay sane as time goes by and her captors try to break and condition her to a new life of servitude.

== Cast ==
- Anna Cieślak as Mariola
- Arno Frisch as Niko
- Rafal Mackowiak as Artur
- Mathieu Carrière as Gunter
- Dominique Pinon as Oncle Goran
- Katarzyna Cygler as Ola
- Małgorzata Buczkowska as Hania
- Barbara Walkówna as Barbara Szymanska, Mariola's Grandmother
- Maciej Kozłowski as Abattoir Examiner
- Mariusz Saniternik as Drunkard
- Grzegorz Piórkowski as Priest
- Jale Arıkan as Nadenka
- David Scheller as Yurij
- Franck Sasonoff as Oman
- Elizabeth Bruck as Helena
- Nedjad Kurtagic as Bouncer
- Jean-Marc Calderoni as Client
- Frédéric Frenay as Body Builder
- Anna Pachnicka as Prison Guard
- Denis Delic as Niko (Voice)

== See also ==
- Cinema of Luxembourg
- List of submissions to the 79th Academy Awards for Best Foreign Language Film
