= Zoology (film) =

- Directed by: Ivan I. Tverdovsky
- Produced by: Natalya Mokritskaya; Mila Rozanova; Uliana Savelyeva
- Starring: Natalya Pavlenkova; Masha Tokareva
- Cinematography: Alexander Mikeladze
- Release date: 24 November 2016
- Running time: 91 min.
- Country: Russia
- Language: Russian

Zoology (Russian: Зоология, romanized: Zoologiya) is a 2016 Russian drama film directed by Ivan I. Tverdovsky. It received generally positive reviews from critics.

== Plot ==
Natasha lives alone with her mother in a small seaside town. Her life is boring and conventional. In the zoo where she works, Natasha has long been an object of ridicule. Suddenly, a strange metamorphosis occurs to her, for no apparent reason she grows a tail. She has to go through shame, hope, and despair to find herself.

== Cast ==
- Natalya Pavlenkova as Natasha
- Masha Tokareva as Katya
- Aleksandr Gorchilin as Stylist
- Dmitriy Groshev as Peter
- Olga Ergina as Secretary

== Reception ==
=== Critical response ===
Zoology has an approval rating of 87% on review aggregator website Rotten Tomatoes, based on 30 reviews, and an average rating of 6.8/10.

=== Awards ===
- 51st Karlovy Vary International Film Festival – Special Jury Prize
- Kinotavr – Best Actress (Natalia Pavlenkova)
