= It's Not the Time of My Life =

- Directed by: Szabolcs Hajdu
- Written by: Szabolcs Hajdu
- Produced by: Dániel Herner; András Muhi; Gábor Ferenczy; Zsófia Muhi
- Starring: Imre Gelányi; Lujza Hajdu; Szabolcs Hajdu
- Cinematography: Csaba Bántó
- Edited by: Szilvia Papp
- Release dates: 7 July 2016 (KVIFF); 1 October 2016
- Running time: 81 minutes
- Country: Hungary
- Language: Hungarian

It's Not the Time of My Life (Hungarian: Ernelláék Farkaséknál) is a 2016 Hungarian drama film directed by Szabolcs Hajdu. It is set in an apartment where two families interact and both couples go through a midlife crisis. The film is based on the director's own play.

It premiered on 7 July 2016 at the 51st Karlovy Vary International Film Festival, where it won the Crystal Globe for best film and Hajdu received the Best Actor Award. It was released in Hungary on 1 October 2016.

== Cast ==
- Erika Tankó as Ernella
- Domokos Szabó as Albert
- Lujza Hajdu as Laura
- Orsolya Török-Illyés as Eszter
- Szabolcs Hajdu as Farkas
- Imre Gelányi as Sanyi

== Reception ==
Alissa Simon of Variety called the film "a fresh and funny chamber piece about midlife marital crises" and wrote: "In addition to the highly relatable situations shot in a style of heightened naturalism and the Robert Altman-like overlapping dialogue, the drama gains further conviction from setting the action in the actual apartment lived in by the director and his wife, who, along with their real-life son, play the host family." The Hollywood Reporter's Boyd van Hoeij wrote: "There's a certain amount of irony in the fact that Hungarian director Szabolcs Hajdu's independently produced It's Not the Time of My Life (Ernellaek Farkaseknal), made without any state aid, turns out to be one of his most conventional features, though it's also one of his most directly moving."
