= Serge Noël =

Belgian poet (1956–2020)

- Born: 23 September 1956; Ixelles, Belgium
- Died: 27 October 2020 (aged 64); Brussels, Belgium
- Occupation: Poet

Serge Noël (23 September 1956 – 27 October 2020) was a Belgian poet and author.

== Bibliography ==
- Le violon-loup (1979)
- Dormir (1981)
- Al Majnûn (1985)
- Voyage à Auschwitz (1998)
- Enfants grimaciers, poèmes (1998)
- Je suis la plus petite place Tien Anmen du monde (1999)
- Mémorial des morts sans tombeau (2000)
- Reconstruisons notre chant d’amour et de guerre (2004)
- Passer le temps ou lui casser la gueule (2005)
- Journal d’un homme seul (2006)
- Un communiqué du ministère de la nuit (2006)
- Un flic ordinaire (2007)
- Le Fils du Père Noël (2007)
- La Passe magique (2011)
- Exil de nos ivresses (2011)
- La beauté des blessures (2012)
- Aux premières heures d'un jour nouveau (2013)
- Danser avec le diable (2014)
- A la limite du prince charmant (2018)

== Collective Works ==
- Bruxelles/Tanger (2006)
- Paroles d’exils (2007)
- Trois planètes (2009)
- J'ai deux amours (2012)
- Classe de oufs! (2013)
- Des intégrations (2014)
- Visages humains (2015)

== Prizes ==
- Prix George Lockem of the Académie royale de langue et de littérature françaises de Belgique for Dormir (1981)
- 1st and 5th Prize of the Université libre de Bruxelles (2001)
- Prix Jeunesse Education permanente of the Fédération Wallonie/Bruxelles for Bruxelles/Tanger (2007)
- Prix Gros sel for Exil de nos ivresses (2012)
