= Monkeys in Winter =

Monkeys in Winter (Bulgarian: Маймуни през зимата, romanized: Maimuni prez zimata) is a 2006 Bulgarian film directed by Milena Andonova.

The film took part in a number of film festivals and won a series of rewards, the most significant of them are following:

- Karlovy Vary International Film Festival, 2006 - best film in competition program "East of West"
- Bulgarian Film Festival Golden Rose, Varna, Bulgaria, September 2006 - the Grand Prize for Bulgarian cinema and other rewards (for the 3 actresses in the main roles)
- National Film Center, Sofia - Best Feature Film for 2006

It was Bulgaria's submission to the 79th Academy Awards for the Academy Award for Best Foreign Language Film, but was not accepted as a nominee.

== See also ==
- List of submissions to the 79th Academy Awards for Best Foreign Language Film
- List of Bulgarian submissions for the Academy Award for Best Foreign Language Film
