= Best Actor Award (Karlovy Vary IFF) =

Film award category

The Best Actor Award is one of main awards of the Feature Film Competition at the Karlovy Vary International Film Festival. It is conferred on the best actor, or the best actors ex aequo.

== Best Actor Award ==
Year	Actor	Film	Original Title	Country
2025	Àlex Brendemühl	When a River Becomes the Sea	Quan un riu esdevé el mar	Spanish-German
2017	Alexander Yatsenko	Arrhythmia	Aritmiya	Russia, Finland, Germany
2016	Szabolcs Hajdu	It's Not the Time of My Life	Ernelláék Farkaséknál	Hungary
2015	Kryštof Hádek	The Snake Brothers	Kobry a užovky	Czech Republic
2014	Nahuel Pérez Biscayart	All Yours	Je suis à toi	Belgium, Canada
2013	Ólafur Darri Ólafsson	XL		Iceland
2012	Henrik Rafaelsen (ex aequo)	The Almost Man	Mer eller mindre mann	Norway
2012	Eryk Lubos (ex aequo)	To Kill a Beaver	Zabić bobra	Poland
2011	David Morse	Collaborator		Canada, USA
2010	Mateusz Kościukiewicz (ex aequo)	Mother Teresa of Cats	Matka Teresa od kotów	Poland
2010	Filip Garbacz (ex aequo)	Mother Teresa of Cats	Matka Teresa od kotów	Poland
2009	Olivier Gourmet (ex aequo)	Angel at Sea	Un ange à la mer	Belgium, Canada
2009	Paul Giamatti (ex aequo)	Cold Souls		United States
2008	Jiří Mádl	Night Owls	Děti noci	Czech Republic
2007	Sergej Puskepalis	Simple Things	Prostyje vešči	Russia
2006	Andrzej Hudziak	Several People, Little Time	Parę osób, mały czas	Poland
2005	Luca Zingaretti (ex aequo)	Come into the Light	Alla luce del sole	Italy
2005	Uri Gavriel (ex aequo)	What a Wonderful Place	Eize makom nifla	Israel
2004	Max Riemelt	Before the Fall	Napola	Germany
2003	Björn Kjellman	Old, New, Borrowed and Blue	Se til venstre, der er en svensker	Denmark
2002	William H. Macy	Focus		United States
2001	Sven Wollter	A Song for Martin	En sång för Martin	Sweden
2000	Ian Hart (ex aequo)	Aberdeen		UK, Norway, Sweden
2000	Hamid Farokhnezad (ex aequo)	The Bride of Fire	Arous-e atash	Iran
1999	Hilmar Thate	Paths in the Night	Wege in die Nacht	Germany
1998	Olaf Lubaszenko	Sekal Has to Die	Je třeba zabít Sekala	Czech Republic, Poland, France, Slovakia
1997	Bolek Polívka	Forgotten Light	Zapomenuté světlo	Czech Republic
1996	Pierre Richard	A Chef in Love	Les 1001 recettes d´un cuisinier amoureux	France, Georgia
1995	Ernst Hugo Jaregard	The Kingdom	Riget	Denmark, Sweden, Germany
1994	Max von Sydow	Time Is Money		France
1992	Guy Pion	Krapatchouk		Spain, Belgium, France
1990	Andrey Smirnov	Chernov		Soviet Union
1988	Les Serdyuk	Straw Bells	Solomennye kolokola	Soviet Union
1986	Leonid Filatov	Chicherin		Soviet Union
1984	Agustín González (ex aequo)	Bicycles Are for the Summer	Las bicicletas son para el verano	Spain
1984	Om Puri (ex aequo)	The Half Truth	Ardh satya	India
1982	Henry Fonda (ex aequo)	On Golden Pond		United States
1982	Donald Sutherland (ex aequo)	Threshold	Canada	
1980	Al Pacino (ex aequo)	…And Justice for All		United States
1980	Uelese Petaia (ex aequo)	Sons for the Return Home		New Zealand
1978	Giuliano Gemma (ex aequo)	I Am the Law	Il prefetto di ferro	Italy
1978	Peter Faber (ex aequo)	Dokter Vlimmen		Netherlands
1976	Zygmunt Malanowicz (ex aequo)	Jarosław Dąbrowski		Poland
1976	Gheorghe Dinica (ex aequo)	Through the Ashes of the Empire	Prin cenuşa imperiului	Romania
1974	Antonio Ferrandis	And the Others	¿…Y el prójimo?	Spain
1972	Ranjit Mallik	Interview		India
1970	Mathieu Carrière	The House of the Bories	La maison des Bories	France
1968	Nikolai Plotnikhov	Your Contemporary	Tvoy sovremennik	Soviet Union
1966	Naum Shopov	Tsar and General	Tsar i general	Bulgaria
1966	Donatas Banionis	Nobody Wanted to Die	Nikto ne khotel umirat	Soviet Union
1964	Wieńczysław Gliński	Echo		Poland
1962	Not conferred			
1960	Laurence Olivier (ex aequo)	The Entertainer		United Kingdom
1960	Erwin Geschonneck (ex aequo)	Leute mit Flügel		East Germany
1958	Maksim Shtraukh	Stories about Lenin	Rasskazy o Lenine	Soviet Union
1957	Not conferred			
1956	Günther Simon	Ernst Thälmann – Führer seiner Klasse		East Germany
1954	Charles Vanel	On Trial	L'affaire Maurizius	France
1952	Sergey Bondarchuk (ex aequo)	Taras Shevchenko		Soviet Union
1952	Pierre Fresnay (ex aequo)	Monsieur Fabre		France
1952	Jan Ciecierski (ex aequo)	First Days	Pierwsze dni	Poland
1951	František Smolík	New Fighter Shall Arise	Vstanou noví bojovníci	Czechoslovakia
1951	Eduard von Winterstein	Die Sonnenbrucks	East Germany	
1950	Not conferred			
1949	Alexander Borisov	Akademik Ivan Pavlov		Soviet Union
1948	Not conferred			
