= Mother Teresa of Cats =

2010 film

Mother Teresa of Cats (Polish: Matka Teresa od kotów) is a Polish drama film directed by Paweł Sala. The premiere was held on 6 July 2010 at the 45th Karlovy Vary International Film Festival in the Czech Republic and on 17 September 2010 in Poland.

== Plot ==
A shocking record of a crime committed by two young boys (12 and 22 years old), committing the murder of their own mother. The film shows a period of 12 months before their arrest, especially the last few days and the time of the investigation until arrested by the Police. The author does not focus on the sensational theme, but tries to focus on the psychological layer, recreating the atmosphere of the family home, psychological portraits of the brothers and their mother – the future victim. In the background we see the environment in which this thoroughly ordinary, modest family lived. There was no indication that there would be a tragedy. There will be no cruelty or brutal literality in this film, yet the author does not resign from the artistic means of sensational and criminal cinema. The film's script is based on facts.

== Cast ==
- Ewa Skibińska as Teresa
- Mariusz Bonaszewski as Hubert, husband of Teresa
- Mateusz Kościukiewicz as Artur, son of Teresa
- Filip Garbacz as Marcin, son of Teresa
- Monika Pikuła as Ewa, Teresa's cousin
- Ewa Szykulska as Krystyna, Teresa's friend
- Janusz Chabior as Jacek
- Małgorzata Łata as Jadzia, daughter of Teresa
- Helena Norowicz as Aunt Róża
- Janusz Łagodziński as Therapist
- Łukasz Simlat as Broker
- Beata Fido as Marcin's teacher
- Piotr Dąbrowski as Colonel
- Marek Serdiukow as Policeman, neighbor
- Marta Dobecka as Wiktoria
- Małgorzata Sadowska as a policewoman on duty
- Grzegorz Mostowicz-Gerszt as district police officer
- Antoni Gryzik as Zygmunt
- Kamil Przystał
- Sebastian Pawlak
- Wojan Trocki
- Robert Olech
- Wojciech Żołądkowicz
- Wojciech Czerwiński
- Marta Linkowska
- Małgorzata Studniarek
- Justyna Straszyńska
- Beata Urbańska
- Mieczysław Chmielewski
- Gennady Chamzyryn
- Krzysztof Rybakowski
- Gerard Łaski
- Robert Dzwonkowski
- Jarosław Szlęcy
- Michał Wołkowicki
- Artur Bekus
- Jakub Mićka
- Kamil Myszka
- Grzegorz Banasik
- Piotr Witkowski
- Damian Wijas
- Rafał Kłosowski
- Wiktor Wandzel
- Adam Nowak
- Dariusz Bąk
- Jakub Bossowski
- Adam Szymański
- Michał Sekunda
- Robert Wandzel
- Piotr Kruszewski

== Festival and awards ==
=== Wins (4) ===
- International Film Festival Karlovy Vary 2010
  - Individual Award – Best Actor: Filip Garbacz
  - Individual Award – Best Actor: Mateusz Kościukiewicz
- Koszalin Film Debut Festival "Youth and Film" 2010
  - director: Paweł Sala
  - feature film
- "Wisła" Polish Film Festival in Russia 2010
  - Elephant (org. Słoń) – distinction

=== Nominations (12) ===
- Polish Golden Film Festival in Gdynia "Golden Lions"
  - Participation in the main competition: Paweł Sala
- New Horizons International Film Festival in Wrocław
  - Competition: New Polish Films – Participation in the competition
- IFF of the Young Viewer "Ale Kino!"
  - Golden Goats – International Jury – Participation in the competition of acting films
- Film Acting Festival Tadeusz Szymków
  - Golden Puppy – The best leading female role: Ewa Skibińska
- International Film Festival Karlovy Vary 2010
  - Crystal Globe – Participation in the main competition: Paweł Sala
- Mastercard OFF CAMERA International Independent Cinema Festival
  - Polish Feature Film Competition – Participation in the competition: Paweł Sala
- Golden Ducks 2010
  - Golden Duck – Best actress of the 2009/2010 season: Ewa Skibińska
  - Golden Duck – Best actor of the 2009/2010 season: Mateusz Kościukiewicz
  - Golden Duck – The best actor of the best films: Mateusz Kościukiewicz
  - Golden Duck – Best Actor of the Best Films: Filip Garbacz
  - Golden Duck – Best cinematographer of the 2009/2010 season: Mikołaj Łepkowski
  - Golden Duck – Best screenwriter for the 2009/2010 season: Paweł Sala
