= Sherrybaby =

2006 film by Laurie Collyer

- Theatrical release poster
- Directed by: Laurie Collyer
- Written by: Laurie Collyer
- Produced by: Marc Turtletaub; Lemore Syvan
- Starring: Maggie Gyllenhaal; Brad William Henke; Sam Bottoms; Kate Burton; Giancarlo Esposito; Danny Trejo
- Cinematography: Russell Lee Fine
- Edited by: Curtiss Clayton; Joe Landauer
- Music by: Jack Livesey
- Production companies: Big Beach; Elevation Filmworks
- Distributed by: Red Envelope Entertainment; IFC Films
- Release dates: January 25, 2006 (Sundance); September 8, 2006 (United States)
- Running time: 96 minutes
- Country: United States
- Language: English
- Budget: $2 million
- Box office: $622,806

Sherrybaby is a 2006 American drama film written and directed by Laurie Collyer. The film premiered in the Dramatic Competition at the 2006 Sundance Film Festival on January 25, 2006 and received a limited release in the United States on September 8, 2006.

== Plot ==
The story takes place in New Jersey. Sherry Swanson, a young woman who has recently been released from prison and is recovering from a heroin addiction, is trying to rebuild her life on the outside. Above all, she wants to repair her relationship with her young daughter, but finds the challenges more daunting than she had expected. Her daughter barely recognizes her and no longer calls her "mommy", the halfway house where she lives has a curfew that interferes with her ability to visit her family. Her relationship with her family has become tense and strained, and she tends to act childlike at times.

In between trips to visit her daughter and her job at a youth center, Sherry attends Alcoholics Anonymous meetings in an effort to beat back her addiction to heroin. She strikes up a relationship with Dean, a fellow addict she meets at Alcoholics Anonymous. The stresses of her damaged relationships with her family, satisfying her parole officer, and finding a way to reconnect with her daughter soon prove overwhelming. Sherry soon starts drinking and using drugs again, putting her parole at risk. Struggling to maintain a grip on her life, Sherry finally breaks down and admits to her brother that she knows she needs help.

== Cast ==
- Maggie Gyllenhaal as Sherry Swanson
- Brad William Henke as Bobby Swanson Jr.
- Sam Bottoms as Bob Swanson Sr.
- Giancarlo Esposito as Parole Officer Hernandez
- Bridget Barkan as Lynette Swanson
- Ryan Simpkins as Alexis Parks
- Kate Burton as Marcia Swanson
- Rio Hackford as Andy Kelly
- Danny Trejo as Dean Walker
- Michelle Hurst as Dorothy Washington
- Caroline Clay as Parole Officer Murphy
- Stephen Peabody as Mr. Monroe

== Reception ==
=== Critical response ===
Sherrybaby received generally positive reviews from critics. Review aggregator Rotten Tomatoes reports that 75% of 67 critics gave the film a positive review. The site's consensus is that "Maggie Gyllenhaal delivers [a] riveting performance as a recovering drug addict in a depressing and not entirely believable movie." Metacritic, which assigns a rating out of 100 to reviews from mainstream critics, calculated a "generally favorable" average score of 66, based on 18 reviews.

Entertainment Weekly praised the film as "emotionally arresting" and "authentic and moving", and describes Gyllenhaal as "such a miracle of an actress that she makes you respond to the innocence of Sherry's desperate, selfish destruction." The Christian Science Monitor also gave a positive review of the film, complimenting Collyer's "vivid eye for detail and the small, telling human moments that make a movie resonate with audiences".

=== Accolades ===
Year	Ceremony	Category	Recipients	Result
2006	11th Satellite Awards	Best Actress - Drama	Maggie Gyllenhaal	Nominated
2006	64th Golden Globe Awards	Best Actress - Drama	Maggie Gyllenhaal	Nominated
2006	Chicago Film Critics Association Awards 2006	Best Actress - Drama	Maggie Gyllenhaal	Nominated
2006	Gotham Awards	Breakthrough Director	Laurie Collyer	Nominated
2006	41st Karlovy Vary International Film Festival	Crystal Globe (Grand Prix)	Sherrybaby	Won
2006	41st Karlovy Vary International Film Festival	Best Actress	Maggie Gyllenhaal	Won
2006	London Film Critics' Circle	Actress of the Year	Maggie Gyllenhaal	Nominated
2006	Milan International Film Festival	Best Actress	Maggie Gyllenhaal	Won
2006	Stockholm International Film Festival	Best Film	Sherrybaby	Won
2006	Stockholm International Film Festival	Best Actress	Maggie Gyllenhaal	Won
2006	Sundance Film Festival	Grand Jury Prize - Dramatic	Sherrybaby	Nominated
