= Franco de Peña =

Polish-Venezuelan film director )

Franco de Peña (born in Caracas) is a Polish-Venezuelan film director.

== Early years and education ==
Born and raised in Caracas, Venezuela, de Peña began studying economics at the Universidad Central de Venezuela, but after two years left Venezuela for Montreal, where he settled. He has been an Invited Artist of the Cannes Film Festival Residence in Paris and the Berlin Kunstler Programme and Nipkow Program in Berlin. De Peña has lived in London, Barcelona before relocating to Poland in 1987. De Peña passed his entrance exams to the Łódź Film School, but had to put his plans on hold. He moved to Warsaw and studied at the Warsaw National Academy of Theatre for two years. He was finally admitted to the Łódź school and graduated in 1997. Franco De Peña has participated in two MASTER CLASSES organised by the European Film Academy: A Master Class by Mike Newell CREATING A WORLD FOR A STORY and a MASTER CLASS BY ALAIN DEROBE with the participation of Florian Maier and Win Wenders STEREOSCOPIC STORY TELLING, CRAFTING AND SHOOTING STORIES IN 3-D. Since 2008, De Peña is the happy father of Anne Sophie. (Sophi)

== Other activities ==
Apart from his film career, Franco de Peña also played the role of a journalist seeking the alleged unknown Argentinian son of Witold Gombrowicz in the para-documentary Letter from Argentina by Grzegorz Pacek and in the German Film "My Sweet Home" by Filippos Tsissos. In addition, he was the author of pictures in the Brazilian documentary Bem-Vindo a São Paulo on Caetano Veloso.

== Awards ==
De Peña has been the recipient of several awards for his films including the Best New Director award at the fifth annual Las Palmas International Film Festival in 2005. His film "Your Name is Justine" was recognized with several festival awards, Your name is Justine received 11 International Awards including those of Montreal, Poznań, and Mons. In 2006, his film YOUR NAME IS JUSTINE was the Luxembourg submission for the 79th Academy Award for Best Foreign Language Film. http://www.screendaily.com/2-october-2006/119.issue Unfortunately the film was refused by the Academy of Motion Picture Arts and Sciences because he was a Venezuelan National. However he was given the PRICE BEST LUXEMBOURG FILM in 2007 Meilleur film de fiction luxembourgeois (Filmpräis 2007) https://web.archive.org/web/20110725182636/http://www.cna.public.lu/actualites/2008/12/fmil_justine/index.html

== Filmography ==
- Może to grzech, że się modlę (Maybe it's sinful to pray, 1993) - a document on a 33-year-old prisoner suffering from AIDS
- Szepty wiatru (The Whispers of the Wind, 1995), on a friendship of an old Andean man with his donkey
- El Porvenir de una Ilusión (The Future of an Illusion; 1997) - a poetic description of dreams of modern inhabitants of Havana
- Amor en concreto (Love in Concrete, 2003) - a sketch of lives of several inhabitants of a modern city
- Masz na imię Justine (Your Name is Justine), 2005, about Mariola, a young Polish woman who elopes with her boyfriend to Germany and finds herself jailed and forced into prostitution.
- Hugo King about the totalitarian mechanism of by Hugo Chávez used to stay in power.

Co writer

"A letter from Argentina", (List z Argentiny) directed by Grzegorz Pacek "Non sono io". Directed by Gabriele Iacovone
