= Milena Andonova =

Bulgarian screenwriter and film director

- Born: 1959 (age 66–67); Burgas, Bulgaria
- Occupations: Film director, screenwriter
- Years active: 1968-present

Milena Andonova (Bulgarian: Милена Андонова; born 23 September 1959) is a Bulgarian screenwriter and film director. She is best known for the film Monkeys in Winter, which she co-wrote and directed.
