= Mateusz Kościukiewicz =

Polish actor (born 1986)

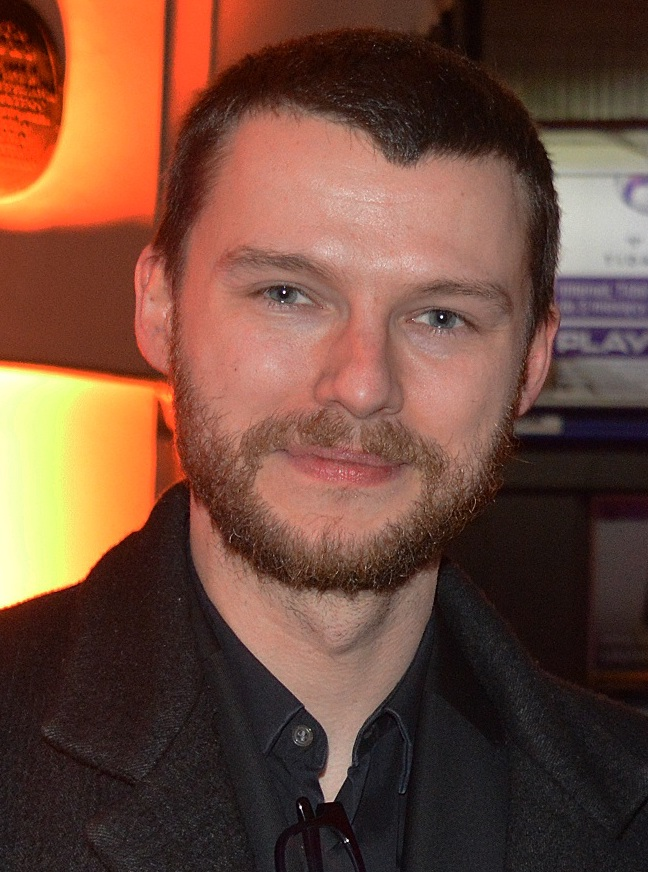
- Kościukiewicz in 2018
- Born: 1 May 1986 (age 40); Nowy Tomyśl, Poland
- Education: AST National Academy of Theatre Arts in Kraków
- Years active: 2006–present
- Spouse: Małgorzata Szumowska

Mateusz Kościukiewicz (Polish: [ˈmatɛwʂ kɔɕt͡ɕuˈkʲɛvit͡ʂ]; born 1 May 1986 in Nowy Tomyśl) is a Polish film actor.

== Early life and career ==
He grew up in Nowy Tomyśl, where he attended the General and Post-Secondary Schools. He studied at the Kraków State Higher Theater School.

In 2010 he received the Karlovy Vary Film Festival Award for the best actor (with Filip Garbacz) for the role in Paweł Sala's film Matka Teresa od kotów. In the same year he won Zbigniew Cybulski Award. In 2011 he received an Eagle in category "Discovery of Year" for the role in All That I Love. He was also nominated in category "Best Actor".

In 2013 Mateusz Kościukiewicz was named one of the 10 most promising acting talents in Europe in EFP's Shooting Star 2014 showcase.

In January 2020 The Informer was released in the US cinemas where Kościukiewicz plays Stazek in his first "Hollywood" role.

== Personal life ==
He has been married to director Malgorzata Szumowska since 2011. They have one daughter named Alina born on 3 December 2012.

== Selected filmography ==
List of films:

- 2009: Sweet Rush
- 2009: All That I Love as Janek
- 2010: Mother Teresa of Cats as Artur
- 2011: Sala samobójców as Jasper (voice)
- 2012: Shameless as Tadek
- 2013: Bejbi blues as Seba
- 2013: Baczyński as Krzysztof Kamil Baczyński
- 2013: In the Name Of as "Dynia" Lukasz
- 2013: Walesa. Man of Hope as Krzysiek
- 2013: Bilet na Księżyc as Antoni Sikora
- 2015: 11 Minutes as ex-boyfriend
- 2015: Disco Polo - co-screenwriter
- 2015: Panie Dulskie as Zbyniu
- 2015: Elixir as Louis
- 2015: Francesco as Francis of Assisi
- 2017: Amok as Krystian Bala
- 2017: Gwiazdy as Jan Banaś
- 2017: Breaking the Limits as Andrzej
- 2018: Mug as Jacek
- 2018: Diagnosis (TVN series) as Prosecutor Paweł Wilecki
- 2018: 1983 (Netflix series) as Kamil Zatoń
- 2019: Solid Gold as Solarz
- 2019: Żużel as Riczi
- 2020: The Informer as Staszek
- 2020: Eagle. Last Patrol as Lieutenant Andrzej Piasecki
- 2020: Magnesium as Albin Hudini
- 2022: EO as Mateo
- 2022: Below The Surface as lieutenant Andrzej Piasecki “Pablo”
- 2023: Dovbush as Przeluski
- 2025: Project UFO (Netflix series) as Zbigniew Sokolik
