= White Palms (film) =

- Directed by: Szabolcs Hajdu
- Written by: Szabolcs Hajdu
- Produced by: Iván Angelusz; Mathieu Kassovitz; Gábor Kovács; Ágnes Pataki; Péter Reich
- Music by: Ferenc Darvas
- Release date: 23 February 2006
- Country: Hungary

White Palms (Hungarian: Fehér tenyér) is a 2006 Hungarian film written and directed by Szabolcs Hajdu. It was Hungary's submission to the 79th Academy Awards for the Academy Award for Best Foreign Language Film, but was not accepted as a nominee.

== See also ==
- List of submissions to the 79th Academy Awards for Best Foreign Language Film
