= Filip Garbacz =

Polish actor (born 1994)

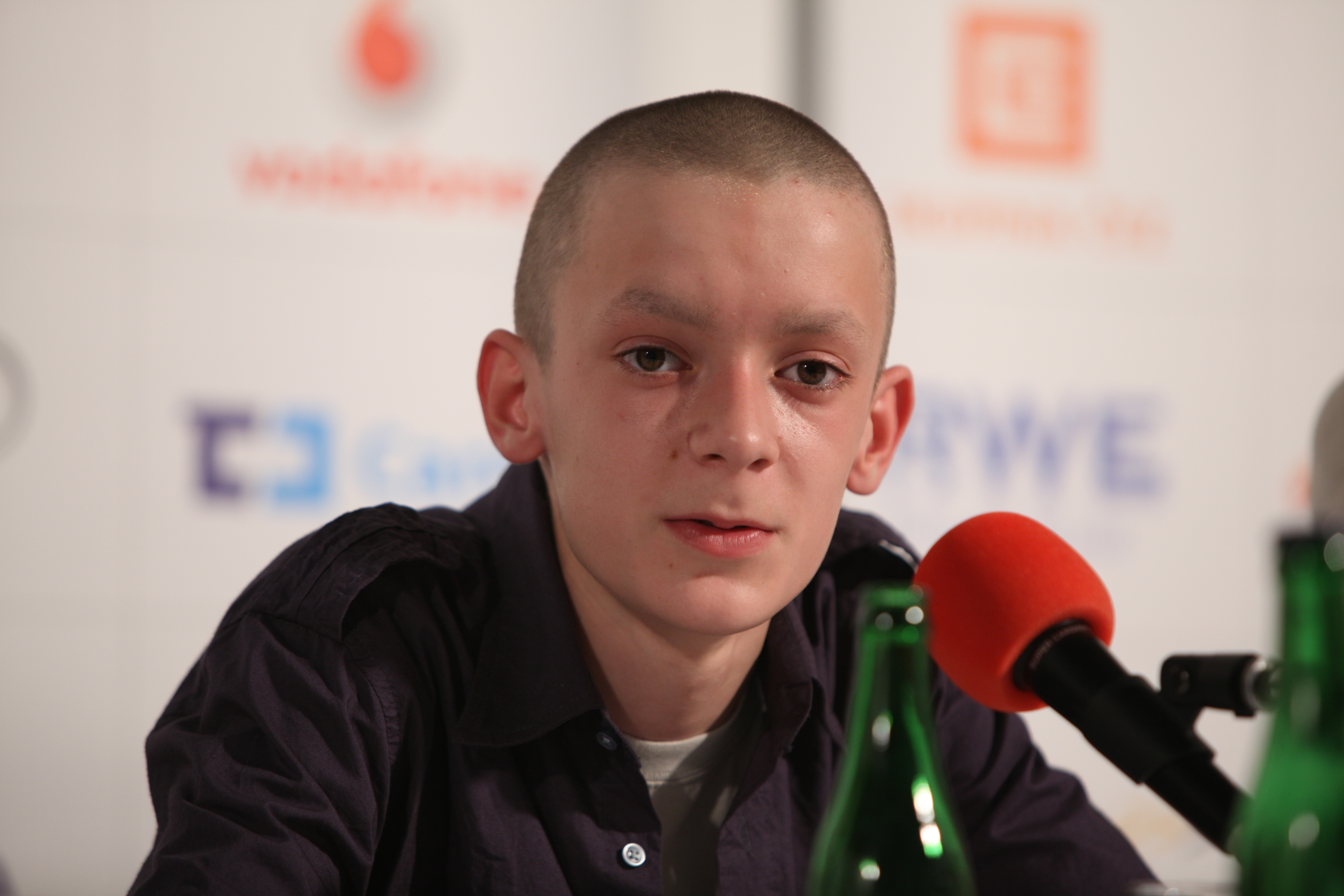
- Born: 3 March 1994; Zgierz
- Occupation: Actor

Filip Garbacz (born 3 March 1994) is a Polish actor.

== Filmography ==
- Świnki (2009) as Tomek
- Mother Teresa of Cats (Matka Teresa od kotów, 2010) as Marcin, son of Teresa
- Maraton tańca as Michaś
- Glasgow (2010)
- Teddyboy (2010), short film, as Andrzej
- 1920. Wojna i miłość as Leszek Kozłowski
- In Darkness (W ciemności, 2011)
- Głęboka woda (2011–2013), TV series, as Rafał Wrzesiński, son of Jacek, episode 8
- Father Matthew (Ojciec Mateusz, 2013), TV series, episode 121
- Komisarz Alex (2013), TV series, as Kacper Bednarski, episode 51
- Gabinet hipnozy (2014), short film, as older boy
- Podszept (2017), short film
- Dziura w głowie (2018) as student at the performance

Source.

== Awards ==
For his role as Tomek in Świnki he received the Best Actor Debut Award at the Polish Film Festival in Gdynia and a Special Mention at the Karlovy Vary International Film Festival. His role as Marcin in Mother Teresa of Cats won him the Best Actor Award at the Karlovy Vary International Film Festival (with Mateusz Kościukiewicz).
