= Szabolcs Hajdu =

Hungarian actor and film director (born 1972)

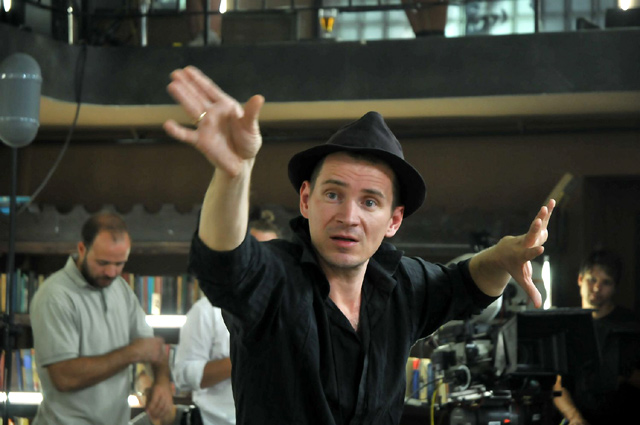
- Born: 26 January 1972 (age 54); Debrecen, Hungary
- Occupation: Director
- Years active: 1991–present
- Spouse: Orsolya Török-Illyés

Szabolcs Hajdu (born 26 January 1972) is a Hungarian actor and film director. He directed more than ten films since 1991.

== Selected filmography ==
| Year | Title | Role | Notes |
|---|---|---|---|
| 1991 | Brats | Attila | |
| 2001 | Sticky Matters | | |
| 2004 | Tamara | | |
| 2006 | White Palms | | |
| 2010 | East Side Stories | | segment "The Wild Side" |
| 2011 | Bibliothèque Pascal | | |
| 2014 | Mirage | | |
| 2015 | The Gambler | | |
| 2016 | It's Not the Time of My Life | | |
| 2020 | Treasure City | | |
| 2025 | Growing Down | | |
