= 1984 Toronto International Film Festival =

Annual Canadian film festival

- Festival poster
- Location: Toronto, Ontario, Canada
- Hosted by: Toronto International Film Festival Group
- No. of films: 225 feature films
- Festival date: September 6, 1984–September 15, 1984
- Language: English
- Website: tiff.net
- 1985 1983

The 9th Toronto International Film Festival (TIFF) took place in Toronto, Ontario, Canada between September 6 and September 15, 1984.

The festival screened 225 feature films and more than half of them were Canadian films. This included the introduction of the dedicated Perspective stream, which remained in place until the 2010s as the festival's primary platform for new Canadian films, as well as Front and Centre, a special retrospective program of historically and artistically significant Canadian films, and Late Night, Great Nights, a late-night program of Canadian genre and cult films resembling the festival's later Midnight Madness program.

In 1984 Top 10 Canadian Films of All Time list was released. It was created by the votes of film critics, professors, fans and festival staff.

== Awards ==
Award	Film	Director
People's Choice Award	Places in the Heart	Robert Benton
Best Canadian Feature Film	A Woman in Transit	Léa Pool
International Critics' Award	Choose Me	Alan Rudolph

== Programme ==
In addition to the film programs noted below, a special tribute event was held to honour actor Warren Beatty for his career, including a special presentation of his films Bonnie and Clyde and Shampoo.

=== Gala Presentations ===
English title	Original title	Director(s)	Production country
All of Me		Carl Reiner	United States
The Bay Boy		Daniel Petrie	Canada
The Brother from Another Planet		John Sayles	United States
Carmen		Francesco Rosi	France, Italy
Full Moon in Paris	Les nuits de la pleine lune	Éric Rohmer	France
The Hit		Stephen Frears	United Kingdom
The Holy Innocents	Los santos inocentes	Mario Camus	Spain
Paris, Texas		Wim Wenders	West Germany, France
Places in the Heart		Robert Benton	United States
A Soldier's Story		Norman Jewison	United States
Stop Making Sense		Jonathan Demme	United States

=== Contemporary World Cinema ===
English title	Original title	Director(s)	Production country
Another Country		Marek Kanievska	United Kingdom
Banana Cop	Ying lun pi pa	Po-Chih Leong	Hong Kong, United Kingdom
Before Dawn	Di 8 dian	Clarence Fok	Hong Kong
Bless Their Little Hearts		Billy Woodberry	United States
Blood Simple		Joel Coen and Ethan Coen	United States
Boy Meets Girl		Leos Carax	France
Choose Me		Alan Rudolph	United States
The Company of Wolves		Neil Jordan	United Kingdom
Constance		Bruce Morrison	New Zealand
The Courage of Others	Le Courage des autres	Christian Richard	Burkina Faso, France
Diary for My Children	Napló gyermekeimnek	Márta Mészáros	Hungary
Embers	Glut	Thomas Koerfer	Switzerland, West Germany
A Flash of Green		Victor Nuñez	United States
Flight to Berlin		Chris Petit	West Germany, United Kingdom
Funny Dirty Little War	No habrá más penas ni olvido	Héctor Olivera	Argentina
Ghost Dance		Ken McMullen	United Kingdom
Giovanni		Annette Apon	Netherlands
The Gold Diggers		Sally Potter	United Kingdom
The Goodbye People		Herb Gardner	United States
Hotel New York		Jackie Raynal	United States
The Illusionist	De illusionist	Jos Stelling	Netherlands
Lothar Lambert Trio: Fraulein Berlin, Paso Doble, Drama in Blonde		Lothar Lambert	West Germany
Love Is the Beginning of All Terror	Der beginn aller schrecken ist die liebe	Helke Sander	West Germany
Man Without Memory	Mann ohne Gedächtnis	Kurt Gloor	Switzerland
The Manbird	De vogelmens	Casper Verbrugge	Netherlands
Memed, My Hawk		Peter Ustinov	United Kingdom, Yugoslavia
Mixed Blood		Paul Morrissey	United States
Naughty Boys		Eric de Kuyper	Belgium, Netherlands
Old Enough		Marisa Silver	United States
On Guard		Susan Lambert	Australia
Orinoko, New World	Orinoko, nuevo mundo	Diego Rísquez	Venezuela
Our Story	Notre histoire	Bertrand Blier	France
Paris Seen By... 20 Years After	Paris vu par... 20 ans après	Chantal Akerman, Bernard Dubois, Philippe Garrel, Frédéric Mitterrand, Vincent Nordon, Philippe Venault	France
Paweogo (The Emigrant)	L'Émigrant	Kollo Sanou	Burkina Faso
The Power of Emotion	Die Macht der Gefühle	Alexander Kluge	West Germany
The Ruins	Khandhar	Mrinal Sen	India
Salome		Laurice Guillen	Philippines
Secret Honor		Robert Altman	United States
Secret Places		Zelda Barron	United Kingdom
The Stilts	Los Zancos	Carlos Saura	Spain
Stranger Than Paradise		Jim Jarmusch	United States
Swann in Love	Un amour de Swann / Eine Liebe von Swann	Volker Schlöndorff	France, West Germany
The Terence Davies Trilogy: Children, Madonna and Child, Death and Transfiguration		Terence Davies	United Kingdom
Three Crowns of the Sailor	Les trois couronnes du matelot	Raúl Ruiz	France
Voro-Nova		Dirk Rijneke, Mildred Van Leeuwaarden	Netherlands
The Voyage	Le Voyage	Michel Andrieu	France
White Madness	De Witte Waan	Adriaan Ditvoorst	Netherlands
White Trash	Kanakerbraut	Uwe Schrader	West Germany
Wildrose		John Hanson	United States

=== Canadian Perspective ===
English title	Original title	Director(s)	Production country
Abortion: Stories From North and South		Gail Singer	Canada
Alex Colville: The Splendour of Order		Don Hutchison	Canada
Democracy on Trial: The Morgentaler Affair		Paul Cowan	Canada
The Future Interior	Le futur intérieur	Yolaine Rouleau, Jean Chabot	Canada
Hey Babe!		Rafal Zielinski	Canada
The International Style		John Paizs	Canada
Le jour S...		Jean Pierre Lefebvre	Canada
Listen to the City		Ron Mann	Canada
Low Visibility		Patricia Gruben	Canada
Mario		Jean Beaudin	Canada
The Masculine Mystique		Giles Walker, John N. Smith	Canada
Next of Kin		Atom Egoyan	Canada
The Obsession of Billy Botski		John Paizs	Canada
Revolutions, at Last, Forever and Ever	Révolutions, d'ébats amoureux, éperdus, douloureux	Jean-Marc Larivière	Canada
Rock & Rule		Clive A. Smith	Canada
Snowscreen		Michael Snow	Canada
Sonatine		Micheline Lanctôt	Canada
Springtime in Greenland		John Paizs	Canada
Unfinished Business		Don Owen	Canada
Walls		Tom Shandel	Canada
A Woman in Transit	La Femme de l'hôtel	Léa Pool	Canada
The Years of Dreams and Revolt	Les Années de rêves	Jean-Claude Labrecque	Canada

=== Stranger Than Fiction: Documentaries ===
English title	Original title	Director(s)	Production country
Before Stonewall		Robert Rosenberg, Greta Schiller, John Scagliotti	United States
Beyond Sorrow, Beyond Pain	Smärtgränsen	Agneta Elers-Jarleman	Sweden
Burroughs		Howard Brookner	United States
Father and Son	Vater und Sohn	Thomas Mitscherlich	West Germany
The Good Fight: The Abraham Lincoln Brigade in the Spanish Civil War		Noel Buckner, Mary Dore, Sam Sills	United States
The Gospel According to Al Green		Robert Mugge	United States
Hell's Kitchen Chronicle		Maren Erskine, Reed Erskine	United States
I'm Almost Not Crazy: John Cassavetes, the Man and His Work		Michael Ventura	United States
Improper Conduct	Mauvaise conduite	Néstor Almendros, Orlando Jiménez Leal	France
In Heaven There Is No Beer?		Les Blank	United States
Notes from Under the Volcano		Gary Conklin	United States
Orson Welles at the Cinemathèque	Orson Welles à la Cinémathèque française	Pierre-André Boutang, Guy Seligmann	France
Patu!		Merata Mita	New Zealand
Robert Frank: The Image of Poetry	Robert Frank: l'immagine della poesia	Giampiero Tartagni	Switzerland
Room 666	Chambre 666	Wim Wenders	France, West Germany
Shadows from Light		Stephen Dwoskin	United Kingdom
Sprout Wings and Fly		Les Blank	United States
Style Wars		Tony Silver	United States
Ten Days in Calcutta	10 Tage in Calcutta	Reinhard Hauff	West Germany
The Times of Harvey Milk		Rob Epstein	United States
Twenty Years of African Cinema	Caméra d'Afrique	Férid Boughedir	Tunisia
Vietnam: The Secret Agent		Jacki Ochs	United States
War Lab	Kriegslabor	Monica Maurer	West Germany

=== Two-Way Streets ===
Formerly known as Culture Under Pressure, this program features films about social and political interaction between different cultures.

English title	Original title	Director(s)	Production country
Another Time, Another Place		Michael Radford	United Kingdom
Argie		Jorge Blanco	Argentina, France
Dog Race	Hunderennen	Bernard Safarik	Switzerland
The Estonians: For the Record		Tiina Soomet	Canada
Incident at Restigouche		Alanis Obomsawin	Canada
The Princes	Les Princes	Tony Gatlif	France
A Season in Hakkari	Hakkâri'de Bir Mevsim	Erden Kıral	Turkey
Silver City		Sophia Turkiewicz	Australia
Skyline	La línea del cielo	Fernando Colomo	Spain
Spadina		David Troster	Canada
The Taking of Samiland	Mo Sámi váldet	Skule Eriksen, Kåre Tannvik	Norway
Where the Green Ants Dream	Wo die grünen Ameisen träumen	Werner Herzog	West Germany

=== Front & Centre ===
Front & Centre was a special one-off program, which screened culturally and artistically important films from throughout the entire history of Canadian cinema.

English title	Original title	Director(s)	Production country
Back to God's Country (1919)		David Hartford	Canada
The Bitter Ash (1963)		Larry Kent	Canada
Blue Winter (1979)	L'hiver bleu	André Blanchard	Canada
The Cat in the Bag (1964)	Le chat dans le sac	Gilles Groulx	Canada
Convicted (1937)		Leon Barsha	Canada
Dirty Money (1972)	La Maudite Galette	Denys Arcand	Canada
Don't Let It Kill You (1967)	Il ne faut pas mourir pour ça	Jean Pierre Lefebvre	Canada
Dream Life (1972)	La Vie rêvée	Mireille Dansereau	Canada
Gina (1975)		Denys Arcand	Canada
Goin' Down the Road (1970)		Donald Shebib	Canada
Good Riddance (1980)	Les Bons débarras	Francis Mankiewicz	Canada
High (1967)		Larry Kent	Canada
J.A. Martin Photographer (1977)	J.A. Martin photographe	Jean Beaudin	Canada
The Last Betrothal (1973)	Les dernières fiançailles	Jean Pierre Lefebvre	Canada
Little Aurore's Tragedy (1952)	La petite Aurore: l'enfant martyre	Jean-Yves Bigras	Canada
Lucky Corrigan (1936)		Lewis D. Collins	Canada
A Married Couple (1969)		Allan King	Canada
Montreal Main (1974)		Frank Vitale	Canada
The Old Country Where Rimbaud Died (1977)	Le Vieux pays où Rimbaud est mort	Jean Pierre Lefebvre	Canada
The Only Thing You Know (1971)		Clarke Mackey	Canada
Orders (1974)	Les Ordres	Michel Brault	Canada
Paperback Hero (1973)		Peter Pearson	Canada
Pour la suite du monde (1963)		Michel Brault, Marcel Carrière, Pierre Perrault	Canada
Proxyhawks (1971)		Jack Darcus	Canada
Réjeanne Padovani (1973)		Denys Arcand	Canada
The River Schooners (1968)	Les Voitures d'eau	Pierre Perrault	Canada
The Rowdyman (1971)		Peter Carter	Canada
A Scream from Silence (1979)	Mourir à tue-tête	Anne Claire Poirier	Canada
Skip Tracer (1977)		Zale Dalen	Canada
Stations (1983)		William D. MacGillivray	Canada
The Time of the Hunt (1972)	Le Temps d'une chasse	Francis Mankiewicz	Canada
The Times That Are (1966)	Le règne du jour	Pierre Perrault	Canada
The True Nature of Bernadette (1972)	La Vraie nature de Bernadette	Gilles Carle	Canada
Wedding in White (1972)		William Fruet	Canada
When Tomorrow Dies (1965)		Larry Kent	Canada
Whispering City (1947)		Fedor Ozep	Canada
Why Shoot the Teacher? (1977)		Silvio Narizzano	Canada
Winter Kept Us Warm (1965)		David Secter	Canada

=== Eyes Write ===
Programmed in collaboration with the Harbourfront Centre, Eyes Write featured a selection of film adaptations of Canadian and international literature.

English title	Original title	Director(s)	Production country
The Apprenticeship of Duddy Kravitz		Ted Kotcheff	Canada
Back to Beulah		Eric Till	Canada
The Blood of Others	Le Sang des autres	Claude Chabrol	France, Canada, United States
The Crime of Ovide Plouffe	Le Crime d'Ovide Plouffe	Denys Arcand	Canada
Gentle Sinners		Eric Till	Canada
Now That April's Here		William Davidson	Canada
Snowbird		Peter Pearson	Canada
The Wars		Robin Phillips	Canada

=== Border Crossings ===
Films which represent some form of collaboration between the Canadian and international film industries, such as international actors and filmmakers working in Canada, or Canadians working on international films.

English title	Original title	Director(s)	Production country
The Act of the Heart		Paul Almond	Canada
Adrift	Touha zvaná Anada	Ján Kadár	Czechoslovakia
The Apprenticeship of Duddy Kravitz		Ted Kotcheff	Canada
Coma		Michael Crichton	United States
A Dangerous Age		Sidney J. Furie	Canada
Dreamspeaker		Claude Jutra	Canada
Eye of the Needle		Richard Marquand	United Kingdom
Get Out Your Handkerchiefs	Préparez vos mouchoirs	Bertrand Blier	France
Ghostbusters		Ivan Reitman	Canada
Isabel		Paul Almond	Canada
The Leather Boys		Sidney J. Furie	United Kingdom
Lies My Father Told Me		Ján Kadár	Canada
Meatballs		Ivan Reitman	Canada
Mon oncle Antoine		Claude Jutra	Canada
Normande	La Tête de Normande St-Onge	Gilles Carle	Canada
Outback		Ted Kotcheff	Australia
Payday		Daryl Duke	United States
The Silent Partner		Daryl Duke	Canada

=== Experiments: The Photographic Image ===
A program of experimental and avant-garde films. The following program is not necessarily complete, as media only reported a selection of films rather than the complete program, and may still include further films listed in the unconfirmed section below. A few relatively mainstream feature films were included in this program, to highlight the evolution of a director, such as Phillip Borsos or Joyce Wieland, who had made both experimental and conventional films over the course of their career.

English title	Original title	Director(s)	Production country
1857 (Fool’s Gold)		R. Bruce Elder	Canada
A and B in Ontario 1984		Joyce Wieland, Hollis Frampton	Canada
À tout prendre		Claude Jutra	Canada
Begone Dull Care		Norman McLaren	Canada
Blinkity Blank		Norman McLaren	Canada
Blue Movie		David Rimmer	Canada
Boogie-Doodle		Norman McLaren	Canada
Bricolage		David Rimmer	Canada
Canon		Norman McLaren, Grant Munro	Canada
Cat Food 1967		Joyce Wieland	Canada
A Chairy Tale		Norman McLaren, Claude Jutra	Canada
Un Chien Andalou		Luis Buñuel	France
Circle		Jack Chambers	Canada
The Crazy Ray	Paris qui dort	René Clair	France
The Dance		David Rimmer	Canada
Daybreak and Whiteye		Stan Brakhage	United States
The Dead		Stan Brakhage	United States
The Devil's Toy	Rouli-roulant	Claude Jutra	Canada
Dripping Water		Michael Snow, Joyce Wieland	Canada
Entr'acte		René Clair	France
The Far Shore		Joyce Wieland	Canada
Flesh of Morning		Stan Brakhage	United States
Fluxes		Arthur Lipsett	Canada
Fracture		David Rimmer	Canada
Free Fall		Arthur Lipsett	Canada
The Grey Fox		Phillip Borsos	Canada
Hapax Legomena I: Nostalgia		Hollis Frampton	United States
The Hart of London		Jack Chambers	Canada
Hen Hop		Norman McLaren	Canada
Illuminated Texts 1982		R. Bruce Elder	Canada
Lines: Horizontal		Norman McLaren, Evelyn Lambart	Canada
Lines: Vertical		Norman McLaren, Evelyn Lambart	Canada
Loops		Norman McLaren	Canada
Migration		David Rimmer	Canada
Nails		Phillip Borsos	Canada
Neighbours		Norman McLaren	Canada
One Second in Montreal		Michael Snow	Canada
Opening Speech		Norman McLaren	Canada
Pas de deux		Norman McLaren	Canada
Perpetual Movement	Mouvement perpétuel	Claude Jutra	Canada
Rat Life and Diet in North America		Joyce Wieland	Canada
Reason Over Passion		Joyce Wieland	Canada
Reflections on Black		Stan Brakhage	United States
La Région Centrale		Michael Snow	Canada
Sailboat 1967		Joyce Wieland	Canada
Seashore		David Rimmer	Canada
Side Seat Paintings Slides Sound Film		Michael Snow	Canada
Sincerity I		Stan Brakhage	United States
Sirius Remembered		Stan Brakhage	United States
Still		Ernie Gehr	United States
Surfacing on the Thames		David Rimmer	Canada
Treefall		David Rimmer	Canada
A Trip Down Memory Lane		Arthur Lipsett	Canada
Ultimatum		Jean Pierre Lefebvre	Canada
Variations on a Cellophane Wrapper		David Rimmer	Canada
Very Nice, Very Nice		Arthur Lipsett	Canada
Watching for the Queen		David Rimmer	Canada
Wavelength		Michael Snow	Canada
Wedlock House: An Intercourse		Stan Brakhage	United States

=== Buried Treasures ===
English title	Original title	Director(s)	Production country
Amanita Pestilens		René Bonnière	Canada
Bar Salon		André Forcier	Canada
Between Friends		Donald Shebib	Canada
Between Salt and Sweet Water	Entre la mer et l'eau douce	Michel Brault	Canada
Eliza's Horoscope		Gordon Sheppard	Canada
La fiction nucléaire		Jean Chabot	Canada
Red		Gilles Carle	Canada
The Skiff of Renald and Thomas	Le canot à Renald à Thomas	Bernard Gosselin	Canada
Sweet Substitute		Larry Kent	Canada
The Vultures	Les Vautours	Jean-Claude Labrecque	Canada
We Are Far from the Sun	On est loin du soleil	Jacques Leduc	Canada

=== Late Nights, Great Nights ===
English title	Original title	Director(s)	Production country
Dr. Frankenstein on Campus		Gilbert W. Taylor	Canada
Fantastica		Gilles Carle	Canada
Mother's Meat and Freud's Flesh		Demitrios Estdelacropolis	Canada
Outrageous!		Richard Benner	Canada
Starship Invasions		Ed Hunt	Canada
Sweet Movie		Dušan Makavejev	France, Canada, West Germany

=== Unconfirmed program ===
Titles listed by the Toronto International Film Festival in its 1984 retrospective list on Letterboxd, but not reflected in available media reportage to verify which program they screened in. Most are short films, which may have screened in Experiments or alongside a feature film in one of the main programs, although a few of them are feature films.

English title	Original title	Director(s)	Production country
69		Robert Breer	United States
98.3 KHz (Bridge at Electrical Storm)		Al Razutis	United States
Acting Out		Ralph Rosenblum, Carl Gurevich	United States
Allures		Jordan Belson	United States
Animals in Motion		John Straiton	Canada
Las Aradas		Janis Lundman	Canada
Blazes		Robert Breer	United States
Buffalo Police on Parade		James H. White	United States
The Cage		Sidney Peterson	United States
Canal		Richard Kerr	Canada
Castro Street		Bruce Baillie	United States
Charade		Jon Minnis	Canada
Le Ciel saisi		Henri Herré	France
City of Gold		Wolf Koenig, Colin Low	Canada
Composition in Blue	Komposition in Blau	Oskar Fischinger	West Germany
Corral		Colin Low	Canada
Diminished		Richard Martin	Canada
Everything Everywhere Again Alive		Keith Lock	Canada
Fireworks		Kenneth Anger	United States
The Flicker		Tony Conrad	United States
The Fox and the Crow	Le Corbeau et le renard	Michèle Pauzé, Yves Leduc, Francine Desbiens, Pierre Hébert	Canada
Grey Owl's Little Brother		Gordon Sparling	Canada
Home for Christmas		Rick Hancox	Canada
Home Sweet Home		Nettie Peña	United States
Idiot's Delight		Clarence Brown	United States
Je sais que j’ai tort, mais demandez à mes copains ils disent la même chose		Pierre Oscar Lévy	France
Joshua in a Box		John C. Lange	United States
Joyful Mystery	Misteryo sa Tuwa	Abbo dela Cruz	Philippines
The Loon's Necklace		F.R. Crawley	Canada
Love Streams		John Cassavetes	United States
Marilyn Times Five		Bruce Conner	United States
McCabe & Mrs. Miller		Robert Altman	United States
Meshes of the Afternoon		Maya Deren, Alexandr Hackenschmied	United States
Mickey One		Arthur Penn	United States
Mirage		Chris Gallagher	Canada
Mother's Day		James Broughton	United States
New Jersey Nights		Veronika Soul	United States
Next to Me		Rick Hancox	Canada
No Rest for Billy Brakko	Pas de repos pour Billy Brakko	Jean-Pierre Jeunet	France
Notes for a Film About Donna and Gail		Don Owen	Canada
Opus 40		Barbara Sternberg	Canada
Portrait	Portret	Stanisław Lenartowicz	Poland
Postcards		Henri Plaat	Netherlands
Rapture	La fleur de l'âge	John Guillermin	
Red Tape: Collected Works		Bill Viola	United States
Rhapsody in Two Languages		Gordon Sparling	Canada
The Road Ended at the Beach		Philip Hoffman	Canada
Roundhay Garden Scene		Louis Le Prince	United Kingdom
Seven Days		Chris Welsby	Canada
Sifted Evidence		Patricia Gruben	United States
The Story		Homer Groening	United States
Trapline		Ellie Epp	Canada
Wildwood Flower		A. K. Dewdney	Canada
Winter Last July		Richard Martin	Canada
Workers Leaving the Lumière Factory	La Sortie de l'usine Lumière à Lyon	Louis Lumière	France

== Top 10 Canadian Films of All Time ==
In conjunction with the Front and Centre program, the festival conducted a poll of film critics to determine the top ten Canadian films from the entire history of Canadian cinema. Following the festival's conclusion, the festival and the Canadian Film Institute collaborated on a touring minifestival to screen the ten films, alongside a selection of short films, in other Canadian cities.

Rank	Title	Year	Director
1	Mon oncle Antoine	1971	Claude Jutra
2	Goin' Down the Road	1970	Don Shebib
3	Good Riddance (Les Bons débarras)	1980	Francis Mankiewicz
4	The Apprenticeship of Duddy Kravitz	1974	Ted Kotcheff
5	The Grey Fox	1982	Phillip Borsos
6	Orders (Les Ordres)	1974	Michel Brault
7	J.A. Martin Photographer (J.A. Martin photographe)	1977	Jean Beaudin
8	Pour la suite du monde	1963	Pierre Perrault
9	Nobody Waved Goodbye	1964	Don Owen
10	The True Nature of Bernadette (La Vraie nature de Bernadette)	1972	Gilles Carle
