= Canada On Screen =

2017 special screening of Canadian films

Canada On Screen was a special screening series of culturally and artistically significant films from the history of cinema of Canada, which took place in 2017 as part of Canada 150.

Curated and presented by the Toronto International Film Festival, the program was screened throughout 2017 as a free screening series at the TIFF Bell Lightbox in Toronto, The Cinematheque in Vancouver, Library and Archives Canada in Ottawa and the Cinémathèque québécoise in Montreal, with some selections from the program screened in other venues across Canada for National Canadian Film Day and other special local events.

== Selections ==
=== Animation ===
English title	Original title	Director(s)	Year
Begone Dull Care		Norman McLaren, Evelyn Lambart	1949
Black Soul	Âme noire	Martine Chartrand	2001
The Big Snit		Richard Condie	1985
Cameras Take Five		Steven Woloshen	2002
The Hat	Le Chapeau	Michèle Cournoyer	1999
Hunger	La Faim	Peter Foldes	1973
The Log Driver's Waltz		John Weldon	1979
The Man Who Planted Trees	L'Homme qui plantait des arbres	Frédéric Back	1987
Neighbours	Voisins	Norman McLaren	1952
Mindscape	Le Paysagiste	Jacques Drouin	1976
Ryan		Chris Landreth	2004
The Sand Castle	Le Château de sable	Co Hoedeman	1977
The Street	La Rue	Caroline Leaf	1976
The Sweater	Le Chandail	Sheldon Cohen	1980
When the Day Breaks		Wendy Tilby, Amanda Forbis	1999

=== Television commercials ===
Title	Advertiser	Agency	Year
"Arctic Sun"	Tropicana	BBDO	2010
"Bike Story"	Canadian Tire	Doner Schur Peppler	1990
"Do You Eat the Red Ones Last"	Smarties	Ogilvy & Mather	1967
"Dove Evolution"	Dove Campaign for Real Beauty	Ogilvy & Mather	2006
"It's Not a Mistake, Start the Car!"	IKEA Canada	Zig	2005
"Meunier"	Pepsi	Blouin Coulombe Dube Thompson	1993
"Mona Lisa"	Caramilk	DDB Canada	1973
"On est six millions faut se parler"	Labatt 50	BCP	1975
"Proud Fathers"	Tim Hortons	Enterprise	2006
"The Rant"	Molson Canadian	Bensimon Byrne	2000

=== Documentaries ===
English title	Original title	Director(s)	Year
Churchill's Island		Stuart Legg	1941
Corral		Colin Low	1954
Cotton Mill, Treadmill	On est au coton	Denys Arcand	1970
Foster Child		Gil Cardinal	1987
Kanehsatake: 270 Years of Resistance		Alanis Obomsawin	1993
Lonely Boy		Wolf Koenig, Roman Kroitor	1962
Manouane River Lumberjacks	Les Bûcherons de la Manouane	Arthur Lamothe	1962
Manufactured Landscapes		Jennifer Baichwal	2006
Manufacturing Consent: Noam Chomsky and the Media		Mark Achbar, Peter Wintonick	1992
A Married Couple		Allan King	1969
Memorandum		Donald Brittain, John Spotton	1965
Men for Sale	Hommes à louer	Rodrigue Jean	2009
My Winnipeg		Guy Maddin	2007
Not a Love Story: A Film About Pornography		Bonnie Sherr Klein	1981
Picture of Light		Peter Mettler	1994
Pour la suite du monde		Pierre Perrault, Michel Brault	1963
The Shimmering Beast	La Bête lumineuse	Pierre Perrault	1982
The Snowshoers	Les Raquetteurs	Gilles Groulx, Michel Brault	1958
Stories We Tell		Sarah Polley	2012
The Things I Cannot Change		Tanya Ballantyne	1967
Warrendale		Allan King	1967
Wrestling	La Lutte	Michel Brault, Marcel Carrière, Claude Fournier, Claude Jutra	1961

=== Experimental film and video ===
English title	Original title	Director(s)	Year
Birthday Suit – with scars and defects		Lisa Steele	1974
The Hart of London		Jack Chambers	1970
The Hundred Videos		Steve Reinke	1989-1996
Lamentations: A Monument for the Dead World		R. Bruce Elder	1985
Like a Dream That Vanishes		Barbara Sternberg	1999
Rat Life and Diet in North America		Joyce Wieland	1968
Reason Over Passion		Joyce Wieland	1969
La Région Centrale		Michael Snow	1971
Sackville, I'm Yours		Colin Campbell	1972
The Thief Lives in Hell	Le Voleur vit en enfer	Robert Morin, Lorraine Dufour	1984
trapline		Ellie Epp	1976
Trees of Syntax, Leaves of Axis		Daïchi Saïto	2009
Variations on a Cellophane Wrapper		David Rimmer	1970
Very Nice, Very Nice		Arthur Lipsett	1961
Wavelength		Michael Snow	1967

=== Feature films ===
English title	Original title	Director(s)	Year
The Apprenticeship of Duddy Kravitz		Ted Kotcheff	1974
Archangel		Guy Maddin	1990
Atanarjuat: The Fast Runner		Zacharias Kunuk	2001
Back to God's Country		David Hartford	1919
Bar Salon		André Forcier	1974
The Bitter Ash		Larry Kent	1963
Black Christmas		Bob Clark	1974
The Cat in the Bag	Le Chat dans le sac	Gilles Groulx	1964
C.R.A.Z.Y.		Jean-Marc Vallée	2005
Calendar		Atom Egoyan	1993
Dead Ringers		David Cronenberg	1988
The Decline of the American Empire	Le Déclin de l'empire américain	Denys Arcand	1986
The Dog Who Stopped the War	La Guerre des tuques	André Melançon	1984
Dream Life	La Vie rêvée	Mireille Dansereau	1972
Goin' Down the Road		Donald Shebib	1970
Good Riddance	Les Bons débarras	Francis Mankiewicz	1979
I've Heard the Mermaids Singing		Patricia Rozema	1987
J.A. Martin Photographer	J.A. Martin photographe	Jean Beaudin	1977
Jesus of Montreal	Jésus de Montréal	Denys Arcand	1989
Léolo		Jean-Claude Lauzon	1992
Life Classes		William D. MacGillivray	1987
Little Aurore's Tragedy	La petite Aurore: l'enfant martyre	Jean-Yves Bigras	1952
Loyalties		Anne Wheeler	1986
Mommy		Xavier Dolan	2014
Mon oncle Antoine		Claude Jutra	1971
My American Cousin		Sandy Wilson	1985
Nobody Waved Good-bye		Don Owen	1964
The Old Country Where Rimbaud Died	Le Vieux Pays où Rimbaud est mort	Jean Pierre Lefebvre	1977
Orders	Les Ordres	Michel Brault	1974
Rude		Clement Virgo	1995
A Scream from Silence	Mourir à tue-tête	Anne Claire Poirier	1979
Sonatine		Micheline Lanctôt	1984
The Sweet Hereafter		Atom Egoyan	1997
Tit-Coq		Gratien Gélinas, René Delacroix	1953
À tout prendre		Claude Jutra	1963
Thirty-Two Short Films About Glenn Gould		François Girard	1993
The True Nature of Bernadette	La Vraie Nature de Bernadette	Gilles Carle	1972
Videodrome		David Cronenberg	1983
Water		Deepa Mehta	2005
A Woman in Transit	La Femme de l'hôtel	Léa Pool	1984

=== Video installation art ===
English title	Original title	Director(s)	Year
...from the Transit Bar		Vera Frenkel	1992
In the Labyrinth		Roman Kroitor, Colin Low, Hugh O'Connor	1967
Overture		Stan Douglas	1986
The Paradise Institute		Janet Cardiff, George Bures Miller	2001
Two Generators		Rodney Graham	1984
Two Sides to Every Story		Michael Snow	1974

=== Music videos ===
Song	Artist	Video director	Year
"1234"	Feist	Patrick Daughters	2007
"60 rue des Lombards"	UZEB	François Girard	1986
"Bye Bye Mon Cowboy"	Mitsou	Pierre Gendron, Ronald Houle, Raymond Vermette	1988
"Drop the Needle"	Maestro Fresh Wes	Joel Goldberg	1990
"Hotline Bling"	Drake	Director X	2015
"In My Secret Life"	Leonard Cohen	Floria Sigismondi	2001
"Neon Bible"	Arcade Fire	Vincent Morisset	2007
"Oblivion"	Grimes	Emily Kai Bock, Grimes	2012
"Queen of Hearts"	Fucked Up	Scott Cudmore	2012
"La rue principale"	Les Colocs	André Fortin	1993

=== Short films ===
English title	Original title	Director(s)	Year
Elvis Gratton		Pierre Falardeau	1981
Frank's Cock		Mike Hoolboom	1993
The Heart of the World		Guy Maddin	2000
The Making of Monsters		John Greyson	1991
Noah		Walter Woodman, Patrick Cederberg	2013
North of Superior		Graeme Ferguson	1971
Rhapsody in Two Languages		Gordon Sparling	1934
Save My Lost Nigga Soul		Clement Virgo	1993
Springtime in Greenland		John Paizs	1981
You Take Care Now		Ann Marie Fleming	1989

=== Television ===
English title	Original title	Genre	Year
Anne of Green Gables		Dramatic miniseries	1985
The Beachcombers		Comedy-drama	1972-1990
The Boys of St. Vincent		Dramatic miniseries	1992
Bye Bye		Sketch comedy	1968-present
Canada: A People's History		Documentary	2000-2001
Codco		Sketch comedy	1986-1992
Degrassi Junior High		Teen drama	1987-1991
The Plouffe Family	La Famille Plouffe	Drama	1953
For the Record		Dramatic anthology	1976-1985
The Friendly Giant		Children's	1958-1985
Hockey Night in Canada	La Soirée du hockey	Sports	1952-present
He Shoots, He Scores	Lance et Compte	Drama series	1986-2015
Minuit, le soir		Drama	2005-2007
Nunavut: Our Land		Documentary	1994-1995
La Petite Vie		Comedy	1993-1997
Point de mire		Newsmagazine	1956-1959
Rock et Belles Oreilles		Sketch comedy	1986-1988
SCTV		Sketch comedy	1976-1981
The Wayne and Shuster Hour		Sketch comedy	1952
This Hour Has Seven Days		Newsmagazine	1964-1966
Wojeck		Drama series	1966-1968
The World Challenge		Documentary	1986
