= List of films and television shows shot in Winnipeg =

There has been a wide range of films and TV series that have been shot in Winnipeg, Manitoba, Canada.

== Television series ==
=== Children's series ===
- 2030 CE – Canadian TV series (2002)
- The Adventures of Shirley Holmes (1996) – Canadian TV series
- Fred Penner's Place (1985–1997) – Canadian TV series
- Let's Go (1976–1987) – Canadian TV series
- My Life as a Dog (1996) – Canadian TV series
- Tipi Tales (2002) – Canadian TV series
- Wawatay Kids TV (2002) – Canadian TV series
- 400 Langside (2005–2006) – Canadian TV series

=== Comedy series ===
- Cashing In (2008, 2009)
- Heater (1999) – filmed on location
- Less Than Kind (2008, 2009) – filmed on location
- Sunnyside (2014) – filmed on location

=== Documentary series ===
- Country Canada (1955)
- Magnificent Obsessions (2002–2003)
- My Winnipeg – Guy Maddin documentary
- The Sharing Circle (1991–2006)

=== Dramatic series ===
- 33 Brompton Place – TV miniseries
- Falcon Beach (2006) – Canadian TV series
- The Pinkertons (2014) – syndicated (Canada/USA) TV series
- Siberia – filmed just outside Winnipeg in Birds Hill Provincial Park
- Throwing Stones (2009) – Canadian TV series pilot
- Tell Me You Love Me (2007) – American cable drama series

=== News and variety shows ===
- 24Hours (1970–2000)
- APTN National News (1999)
- The Big Breakfast (1997–2005)
- Breakfast Television (2005–2009)
- Canadian Idol (2002–2007) – segments filmed in Winnipeg
- Hymn Sing (1965–1995)
- Reach for the Top (1966–1984) – location edition filmed in Winnipeg

=== Reality series ===
- It's a Living (1999)
- KinK (2002–2006)
- Road Hockey Rumble (2007)

== Films ==
=== Major studio films ===
- Time Cut (2024)
- 49th Parallel (1941)
- The Assassination of Jesse James by the Coward Robert Ford (2006)
- Beethoven's Christmas Adventure (2011) – segments filmed in Transcona
- The Big White
- Black Ice (1992)
- Blue State (2007)
- Capote (2005)
- Champions (2023)
- Christmas Rush (2002; also known as Breakaway) – TV movie; some scenes filmed in Winnipeg at Portage Place mall
- The Clown at Midnight (1998)
- The Constant Gardener (2005) – segments filmed in Winnipeg
- Cult of Chucky (2017)
- For Keeps? (1988) – segments filmed in Winnipeg
- Faces in the Crowd (2010)
- Fractured (2019)
- Full of It (2007)
- The Good Life (2007)
- Goon (2011)
- The Haunting in Connecticut (2009)
- Heaven is for Real (2014)
- Horsemen (2009)
- How It Ends (2018)
- K-19: The Widowmaker (2002) – segments filmed in Winnipeg
- Look Away (2018)
- Love Hurts (2025)
- The Lookout (2007)
- New in Town (2009)
- Nobody (2021)
- Nobody 2 (2025)
- One Last Dance (2003)
- Radius (2017)
- Shall We Dance (2004)
- Siberia (2018) – segments filmed in Winnipeg.
- Silence of the North (1981) – segments filmed in Winnipeg
- Tamara (2005)
- Violent Night (2022)
- Whiteout (2009)
- Wild Cherry (2009) – filmed in Winnipeg at Tec Voc High School
- Wishmaster 3: Beyond the Gates of Hell (2001) – filmed in Winnipeg at University of Manitoba
- Wishmaster: The Prophecy Fulfilled (2002)
- Woman Wanted (2000)
- Orphan: First Kill (2022)

=== Independent films ===
- 88:88 (2015) – made by Isiah Medina
- Aegri Somnia (2008) – written and directed by James Rewucki
- Borealis (2015) – written and produced by Jonas Chernick, directed by Sean Garrity film
- Clown at Midnight (1998) – writer Kenneth J. Hall; director Jean Pellerin
- Cord (alternate title: Hide and Seek) (2000) – directed by Sidney J. Furie
- Cowards Bend the Knee (2003) – Guy Maddin film
- Crime Wave (1985) – written and directed by John Paizs
- Foodland (2010) – filmed on location
- For Angela (1993) – dramatization of Rhonda Gordon's response to racism on a Winnipeg city bus
- Hey, Happy! (2001) – Noam Gonick film
- Hyena Road (2014) – Paul Gross film; partly filmed in Winnipeg
- Keyhole (2011)
- Leaving Metropolis (2002)
- The Mother and the Bear (2024)
- Mob Story (1990) – filmed on location
- Niagara Motel (2005)
- Night Mayor (2009) – filmed and set in Winnipeg
- The Outside Chance of Maximilian Glick (1988)
- Perfect Sisters (2014) – directed by Stanley M. Brooks
- Purple City (2023) – directed by Noam Gonick
- Taken in Broad Daylight (2009) – filmed on location
- Ted Baryluk's Grocery (1982) – National Film Board of Canada documentary
- Twilight of the Ice Nymphs (1997) – filmed on location
- The Saddest Music in the World (2003) – filmed on location
- The Stone Angel (2007) – filmed on location
- Stryker (2004) – filmed on location
- Wait Till Helen Comes (2014) – Valérie d'Auteuil and André Rouleau film
- We Were Children (2012) – partially shot in Winnipeg
- You Kill Me (2007) – John Dahl film
- Zeyda and the Hitman (2004) – filmed on location

=== TV movies of the week ===
- The Arrow (1997)
- Behind the Camera: The Unauthorized Story of Three's Company (2003)
- Category 6: Day of Destruction (2004)
- Category 7: The End of the World (2005)
- The Crooked E: The Unshredded Truth About Enron (2003)
- Escape from Mars (1999)
- Hell on Heels: The Battle of Mary Kay (2002)
- Home Alone: The Holiday Heist (2012)
- Inside the Osmonds (2001)
- Keep Your Head Up, Kid: The Don Cherry Story (2010)
- A Marriage of Convenience (1998)
- Roswell: The Aliens Attack (1999)
- A Season on the Brink (2002)
- Secret Cutting (2000)
- We Were the Mulvaneys (2002)

== Special effects ==
- Across the Universe (2007) – special effects
- Alien Resurrection (1997) – special effects contributed to DVD release
- Avatar (2009) – special effects
- The Big Empty (2005) – special effects
- Catwoman (2004) – special effects
- The Chumscrubber (2005) – special effects
- The Core (2003) – special effects
- Cursed (2005) – special effects
- Dragonball: Evolution (2009) – special effects
- Duplicity (2009) – special effects
- Fantastic Four: Rise of the Silver Surfer (2007) – special effects
- Firewall (2006) – special effects
- G.I. Joe: The Rise of Cobra (2009) – special effects
- Greatest Tank Battles (2011) – special effects & animation (S2 ep3, 7 & 8)
- Grindhouse (2007) – special effects
- Hangman's Curse (2003) – special effects
- The Italian Job (2003) – special effects
- Journey to the Center of the Earth (2008) – special effects
- The Last Stand (2013) – special effects
- Little Boy (2015) – special effects
- Mr. Magorium’s Wonder Emporium (2007) – special effects
- Paycheck (2003) – special effects
- Poseidon (2006) – special effects
- Resident Evil: Apocalypse (2004) – special effects
- Scooby-Doo 2: Monsters Unleashed (2004) – special effects
- Silent Hill (2006) – special effects
- Silent Night (2012) – special effects
- Sky Captain and the World of Tomorrow (2004) – special effects
- Stay (2005) – special effects
- Superman Returns (2006) – special effects
- Swordfish (2001) – special effects
- Tooth Fairy (2010) – special effects
- The X-Files: I Want to Believe (2008) – special effects

== Works famously not filmed in Winnipeg ==
- The Office (US)

Parts of the eighth episode "Business Trip" from the fifth season were set in Winnipeg. The NBC comedy is filmed in Los Angeles and due to their schedule/budget did not film scenes in Winnipeg. Though the series had shot scenes in New York City, they never left California for this episode. The episode did not call for any Winnipeg-specific locales. Los Angeles International Airport filled in for Winnipeg James Armstrong Richardson International Airport. A downtown hotel and bar in the Financial District were the other two settings. Characters Michael Scott, Oscar Martinez, and Andy Bernard visited Winnipeg in November. Michael was the only Dunder-Mifflin Regional Manager willing to visit Winnipeg in November. Andy was brought along mainly for being able to speak French, while Oscar is an accountant. They were there on a sales call to sell paper. While in Winnipeg, Oscar and Andy get drunk at a bar and become friends after limited interactions back at the office. Michael, with some help from Andy, hooks up with the hotel concierge at a bar. They go back to her room at the hotel. After having sex, Michael is kicked out of the room. The next day the three go to the sales meeting and secure the client for two years. However, Michael did not enjoy this stay in Winnipeg as it was not the "international" location he envisioned it to be and was still upset about his girlfriend being transferred in an earlier episode.

Destination Winnipeg sent the show Winnipeg items such as Old Dutch chips and Fort Garry Brewing Company beer bottles. The budget also limited the amount of fake snow used in the episode. Writer Brent Forrester explained in a CBC News interview that, "It seemed like Montreal was maybe too exotic and Vancouver also a little maybe too conventionally sexy, and Winnipeg seemed to strike the right balance between exotic and obscure." Surprisingly, there was only one brief joke at the expense of Winnipeg, about traveling there in November. Canadian writer Anthony Farrell ensured the script was not filled with Canadian stereotypes.

- The Simpsons

For the show's 16th season, parts of the sixth episode, "Midnight Rx," took place in Winnipeg. The episode dealt with Homer Simpson and his dad traveling to Winnipeg to obtain cheap prescription drugs and smuggle them into the States. They become heroes back in Springfield, USA when they brought the cheap prescription drugs. Ned Flanders and Apu Nahasapeemapetilon later join the Simpson men on another trip to Winnipeg. Ned encounters a Winnipegger who talks and looks just like he does. Ned was upset to find out his Canadian counterpart was smoking medical marijuana, called a "reeferino." The four then drive to the Manitoba/North Dakota border crossing where their drug smuggling is discovered.

Instead of "Welcome to Winnipeg: One Great City!" the Simpsons drove by "We Were Born Here, What's Your Excuse" on the welcome sign.

- Legends of the Fall (1994)

The film's producers wanted to use Winnipeg's Exchange District, renowned for its wealth of turn of the century-era warehouses and office buildings, for scenes taking place in Helena, Montana. This plan was scuttled when several residents, and later city government, objected to the film crew's desire to remove several dozen trees growing along the sidewalks. Although TriStar offered to replant and/or replace the trees after wrapping, they were rebuffed.
