= The Three Worlds of Nick =

- Directed by: John Paizs
- Written by: John Paizs
- Produced by: John Paizs; Greg Klymkiw
- Starring: John Paizs
- Cinematography: John Paizs
- Edited by: Jon Coutts; Gerry Klym; John Paizs
- Production company: Winnipeg Film Group
- Release date: November 25, 1983
- Running time: 95 minutes
- Country: Canada
- Language: English

The Three Worlds of Nick is a Canadian anthology film, comprising John Paizs's short film trilogy of Springtime in Greenland (1981), Oak, Ivy, and Other Dead Elms (1982) and The International Style (1983). The films all starred Paizs as Nick, a "quiet man" who never speaks in any of the three films, but is placed in very different scenarios which each represent a different genre of film; Paizs described the character as "a Buster Keaton-like character in the sound era", and named him after Ernest Hemingway's recurring semi-autobiographical Nick Adams character.

The films were originally conceived as a feature film, but as a novice filmmaker Paizs had difficulty securing the funding to make a feature, and instead made each part as a standalone short film before they were exhibited in their entirety as The Three Worlds of Nick in 1983.

The trilogy has also sometimes been considered to include Paizs's 1980 short film The Obsession of Billy Botski; although named differently, Billy Botski in that film was still portrayed by Paizs and had some character traits in common with Nick, and the film shared some thematic and stylistic connections with the official trilogy. A screening at the 1984 Festival of Festivals, under the title Three by Paizs, included The Obsession of Billy Botski while excluding Oak, Ivy, and Other Dead Elms; when The Three Worlds of Nick was released on DVD by the Winnipeg Film Group in 2016, it included The Obsession of Billy Botski as a bonus film in addition to all three of the official Nick films.

== Films ==
=== Springtime in Greenland ===
Presented in the style of an educational documentary about a foreign culture, Springtime in Greenland centres on Nick and his family, who live in the fictional suburban town of Greenland and are preparing and engaging in the springtime ritual of a pool party. In the full anthology, the film is introduced as "The First World...Nick at home".

In 2008, Toronto's Royal Cinema mounted a retrospective of Paizs' films, including Springtime in Greenland alongside the feature films Crime Wave and Top of the Food Chain. It was also the only film in the trilogy to have already been available on home video prior to the release of the 2016 DVD. In 2017, Springtime in Greenland was selected for inclusion in Canada On Screen, the Toronto International Film Festival's retrospective of Canadian cinema which was staged as part of Canada 150.

It has also been suggested that Springtime in Greenland may have been an influence on David Lynch's 1986 film Blue Velvet, as Lynch served on the award jury at the Calgary Underground Film Festival when Springtime in Greenland screened there a few years before Blue Velvet was released.

=== Oak, Ivy, and Other Dead Elms ===
Parodying 1940s film noir thrillers, the film depicts Nick attending university, where he comes into the social orbit of Brock (Peter Jordan), a student whose determination to win election as student union president spirals into a terror campaign of far-right violence. In the full anthology, the film is introduced as "The Second World...Nick learns something".

Guy Maddin also makes a small appearance in the film, as a student in Brock's entourage.

=== The International Style ===
Parodying science fiction films, The International Style features Nick as a burglar who infiltrates a secret society of billionaires to steal a microchip that contains the secret necessary to save humanity from destruction, while simultaneously trying to win the heart of Carmel Frosst (Kathy Driscoll), the sister of the secret society's leader Quinton (John Harvie). In the full anthology, the film is introduced as "The Third World...Nick finds love". The end of the film reveals that following his mission, Nick has retired to a simple domestic life with a wife and child, back in Greenland.

Maddin appears in the film, acting in drag as a homicidal nurse.

=== The Obsession of Billy Botski ===
Although not one of the Nick films, The Obsession of Billy Botski has often been discussed and packaged alongside them due to its thematic and stylistic relationship with the official trilogy. Unlike the Nick films in which the "quiet man" does not speak at all, Billy Botski does narrate the film in voice-over despite not speaking any dialogue.

The film centres on Billy Botski, a man who has a creepy obsession with "Connie", a pop culture icon who represents the archetype of the "mythical virgin slut". However, when Connie dies mere moments after Billy finally meets her for the first time, he is forced to figure out how to deal with her dead body.

== Critical response ==
Morley Walker of the Winnipeg Sun wrote of the 1983 screening that "by far the project's most striking aspect is that it's a permanent record of Paizs's progress as a filmmaker. He shot the three sections chronologically, and you see him get better — as a story-teller and as technician — before your eyes."

In an analysis of all of the Nick films alongside The Obsession of Billy Botski, Geoff Pevere wrote that Paisz "speaks to that vast generation of culturally polluted schizophrenic Canadians who grew up with their feet in the slush and their eyes on Beverly Hills, for whom television was a persistently seductive, and ultimately masochistic, vision of what we wished for but could never attain: to be just like our older brother. It is this institutionalized position as the lesser sibling, peripheral voyeur and perpetual window-shopper at the pop-culture marketplace, that informs these films and lends them a potential for truly relevant rapport among Canadians that is frankly unique among our filmmakers of his generation."
