= Winnipeg Film Group =

Cultural organization in Winnipeg, Canada

- Founded: December 27, 1974; 51 years ago
- Headquarters: 304 - 100 Arthur Street, Winnipeg, MB R3B 1H3
- Key people: Kevin Tabachnick, Board Chair
- Website: winnipegfilmgroup.com/

The Winnipeg Film Group (WFG) is an artist-run film education, production, distribution, and exhibition centre in Winnipeg, Manitoba, committed to promoting the art of Canadian cinema, especially independent cinema.

While specializing in short films, WFG's collection ranges from works one-second shorts to full-length features, with films spanning various genres including narrative drama and comedy, animation, documentary and experimental, as well as hybrids of genres. The organization has been noted for spearheading and playing a key role in the development of a distinctly Winnipeg-based style of filmmaking, which often draws on unconventional, experimental and avant-garde styles of filmmaking — such as Guy Maddin's frequent use of the visual language of old silent films — to tell surreal and anti-authoritarian stories.

As a non-profit organization, its operations are funded by the Canada Council for the Arts, Manitoba Arts Council, and Winnipeg Arts Council.

== History ==
The Winnipeg Film Group was established in 1974 as a product of the annual Canadian Film Symposium at the University of Manitoba, which was dedicated to celebrating and screening independent Canadian cinema.

During the Symposium, several local independent filmmakers came together to approach the government to help fund the creation of the Winnipeg Film Group, aiming to pool resources towards making independent films. By the end of the Symposium, all filmmakers in attendance—including Denys Arcand, Donald Shebib, and Colin Low—signed what they called the "Winnipeg Manifesto," which began, "We, the undersigned filmmakers, wish to voice our belief that the present system of film production / distribution / exhibition works to the extreme disadvantage of the Canadian filmmaker."

The Winnipeg Film Group was officially incorporated on 27 December 1974. Soon after, in 1976, WFG collaboratively produced its first completed film, Rabbit Pie. In 1980, You Laugh Like a Duck marked the first co-production between WFG and the Atlantic Filmmakers Cooperative. The following year, WFG began distributing independent films, and in the fall of 1982, WFG began its cinematheque/revival house program (called Cinematheque), screening at the National Film Board’s Cinema Main. In 1984, The Three Worlds of Nick became the first WFG film to be screened at Toronto Festival of Festivals (now the Toronto International Film Festival).

In 1986, WFG, in its entirety (including Cinematheque), moved into its current location in the Artspace Building at 100 Arthur Street, across the street from Winnipeg's Old Market Square. In 1989, three WFG members were nominated for Genie Awards: Ed Ackerman for Primiti Too Taa, Lorne Bailey for The Milkman Cometh, and Guy Maddin for Tales From The Gimli Hospital.

In 1993, Watershed Media Trust in Bristol, England, hosted an 8-city, 4-film tour of work from the Winnipeg Film Group. WFG also partnered with Video Pool to establish "RE:VISIONS – The Winnipeg Women’s Film and Video Festival". Also that year, the WFG earned a lifetime achievement award from the Canadian Film and Television Producers Association. In 1999, Gordon Wilding's Rapture (1997) became the first WFG-supported film to be part of the Cannes Film Festival.

In 2015, WFG launched the Women’s Film & Video Network (now Womxn’s Film & Video Network), purposed to supporting the film and video work of women in Manitoba. The network would become arms-length and member-led in 2019, changing its name to Womxn’s Film and Video Network.

== Select filmography ==
Early films of the Winnipeg Film Group include:

- 1976. Rabbit Pie, directed by Allan Kroeker
- 1979. Day Dream, directed by Alan Pakarnyk
- 1980. You Laugh Like a Duck, directed by Leon Johnson
- 1984. The Three Worlds of Nick, directed by John Paizs — screened at Toronto Festival of Festivals (now the Toronto International Film Festival, or TIFF)
- 1985. Crime Wave, directed by John Paizs — won Manitoba Motion Picture Industry Association’s Blizzard Award for Best Film of the Decade in 1997
- 1986. Downtime, directed by Greg Hanec — screened at the Berlin International Film Festival
- 1988. Tales from The Gimli Hospital, directed by Guy Maddin — Maddin was nominated for a Genie Award
- 1990. Archangel, directed by Guy Maddin — voted Best Experimental Film by the U.S. National Society of Film Critics in 1991
- 1992. Dog Stories, directed by Shereen Jerrett — premiered at the Sydney International Film Festival
- 1993. Taken for a Ride, directed by Dirk Schwipper — Schwipper, from Stuttgart, became WFG’s first German intern
- 1995. Odilon Redon, directed by Guy Maddin — received the NFB John Spotton Award at TIFF
- 1996. Soft Like Me, directed by Jeff Erbach — screened at the TIFF; purchased in 1998 by Canal+ for European broadcast
- 1997. Rapture, directed by Gordon Wilding — purchased by Canal+ in 1999 for broadcast in France; became the first WFG-supported film to be part of the Cannes Film Festival
- 2000. The Heart of the World, directed by Guy Maddin and commissioned by TIFF — named the 2001 Best Experimental Film by critics on two continents.
- 2001. Inertia, directed by Sean Garrity and produced by Brendon Sawatzky — named the 2001 Best Canadian First Feature Film at TIFF
- 2001. FILM(dzama), directed by Deco Dawson — named the 2001 Best Short at TIFF

== Operations ==
Winnipeg Film Group provides training, funding, and equipment rentals to independent filmmakers. In terms of distribution, it makes Canadian films available to local, national, and international film festivals, broadcasters, other film co-ops, cinemas, and a variety of other presenting organizations.

WFG's first film, Rabbit Pie, was made in 1976 and was collaboratively produced. Directed by Allan Kroeker, it is a pastiche of silent film tropes involving a plot wherein infant rabbits are eaten at a restaurant.

The WFG is governed by a board of directors, which maintains the WFG’s bylaws and supports WFG's mandate, including by directly supporting private-sector fundraising. As the WFG is an artist-run organization, its board must mainly include practicing filmmakers and video artists.

As a non-profit organization, WFG operations are funded by the Canada Council for the Arts, Manitoba Arts Council, and Winnipeg Arts Council. Project funders include Manitoba Film & Music, The Winnipeg Foundation, the Government of Manitoba, and Winnipeg School Division, in addition to individual project funders. Ongoing sponsors include William F. White International, On Screen Manitoba, and Film Training Manitoba.

=== Cinematheque ===
Dave Barber Cinematheque, formerly Winnipeg Cinematheque, as the professional presentation department of the Winnipeg Film Group, is a cinematheque theatre that screens both Canadian and world cinema. Operated on the first floor of the historic Artspace building in Winnipeg's Exchange District, it has one screen and plays two evening shows on weekdays, and matinées on the weekends.

The focus is on Canadian films, particularly the cinema of Manitoba, but there are also special screenings for international independent films, children's films, and classic films; Cinematheque also produces the annual Gimme Some Truth Documentary Festival.

Originally known as Winnipeg Cinematheque, the theatre was renamed the Dave Barber Cinematheque after the 2021 passing of Dave Barber—the Cinematheque's senior programmer since 1982.

== Members ==
WFG is notable for having many past staff and members attain prominent positions in the Canadian media industry. Honorary members are appointed for their "exceptional achievement as a Manitoba filmmaker or for their extraordinary contribution to the development of the Winnipeg Film Group as an organization."

Honorary members of the WFG include:

- Norma Bailey
- Dave Barber
- Richard Condie
- Larry Desrochers
- Michael Drabot
- Greg Hanec
- Shereen Jerrett
- Merit Jensen Carr
- John Kozak
- Guy Maddin
- Solomon Nagler
- Winston Washington Moxam
- John Paizs
- Jeff Peeler
- Len Pendergast

Other artists/members of WFG include:

- Atelier National du Manitoba
- Sara Angelucci
- Kiarash Anvari
- Shane Belcourt
- Warren Cariou
- Shelagh Carter
- Ervin Chartrand
- David Demchuk
- Shawna Dempsey
- Kevin Doherty
- Danishka Esterhazy
- Erica Eyres
- Darcy Fehr
- Sadaf Foroughi
- Matthew Rankin

Dave Barber has been the Cinematheque programmer at the Winnipeg Film Group since the summer of 1982. He has won several awards for his efforts including the Making A Difference Award for “Extraordinary Contribution” to the Arts by the Winnipeg Arts Council (2007), the first-ever awarded Individual Award for “Outstanding Award of the Arts" by the Manitoba Foundation for the Arts, and the Queen Elizabeth II Diamond Jubilee Award by the Governor-General of Canada in April of 2013.
