= When Tomorrow Dies =

- Directed by: Larry Kent
- Written by: Larry Kent; Robert Harlow
- Produced by: Larry Kent
- Starring: Patricia Gage; Douglas Campbell; Neil Dainard
- Cinematography: Doug McKay
- Edited by: Hajo Hadeler
- Music by: Jack Dale
- Production company: Larry Kent Productions
- Release date: November 24, 1965
- Running time: 87 minutes
- Country: Canada
- Language: English

When Tomorrow Dies is a Canadian drama film, directed by Larry Kent and released in 1965. The film stars Patricia Gage as Gwen James, a housewife trapped in an unfulfilling marriage to Doug (Douglas Campbell), who returns to university and embarks on an extramarital affair with her professor Patrick Trevelyan (Neil Dainard).

The film was shot in Vancouver, British Columbia, for a budget of $100,000, the largest budget Kent had worked with on any of his films to that time. It also marked his first time directing a screenplay that he had not written entirely on his own, as the film was written primarily by University of British Columbia creative writing professor Robert Harlow.

The film had its theatrical premiere on November 24, 1965 in Vancouver.

It was later screened at the 1984 Festival of Festivals as part of Front & Centre, a special retrospective program of artistically and culturally significant films from throughout the history of Canadian cinema. It was also part of a retrospective of Kent's films, alongside The Bitter Ash, Sweet Substitute and High, which screened at a number of venues in 2002 and 2003, including Cinematheque Ontario in Toronto, the Pacific Cinémathèque in Vancouver and the Canadian Film Institute in Ottawa.
