= High (film) =

- Film poster
- Directed by: Larry Kent
- Written by: Larry Kent
- Produced by: Larry Kent
- Starring: Lanny Beckman; Astri Thorvik
- Cinematography: Paul Van der Linden
- Edited by: Pierre Savard
- Production company: Cinema Ventures
- Release date: 1967
- Running time: 80 minutes
- Country: Canada
- Language: English

High is a film released in 1967, directed by Larry Kent and starring Lanny Beckman, Astri Thorvik, Peter Mathews, Joyce Cay, and Denis Payne. The film was banned by the censors of Quebec immediately before its scheduled premiere at the Montreal International Film Festival for its use of drugs, nudity, and explicit sex scenes.

Filmmakers Jean Renoir, Fritz Lang, and Warren Beatty defended High as a film of art, rather than gratuity.

== Plot ==
High is the story of dope-dealing university dropout Tom, and his strait-laced girlfriend Vicky whom he corrupts and leads down a path of petty crime and uninhibited sex.

== Cast ==
- Lanny Beckman as Tom (as Lanning Beckman)
- Astri Thorvik as Vicky (as Astri Torvik)
- Peter Mathews
- Joyce Cay
- Denis Payne
- Laurie Wynn Kent
- Doris Cowan
- Mortie Golub
- Carol Epstein
- Al Mayoff
- Melinda McCracken
- Gary Eisenkraft
- Jack Esbein

== Reception ==
High is described in Peter Morris's 1984 Film Companion as Larry Kent's best film. It had a wide theatrical release in the U.S., however its sex scenes and dope smoking led to and a ban by the censor boards in Ontario and British Columbia.

== Legacy ==
The film was screened at the 18th Berlin Film Festival in 1968 as part of Young Canadian Film, a lineup of films by emerging Canadian filmmakers. It was later screened at the 1984 Festival of Festivals as part of Front & Centre, a special retrospective program of artistically and culturally significant films from throughout the history of Canadian cinema. Kent considered High on of his crowning achievements.

It was part of a retrospective screening of Kent's films, alongside The Bitter Ash, Sweet Substitute, and When Tomorrow Dies. The retrospective screened at a number of venues in 2002 and 2003, including the venues Cinematheque Ontario in Toronto, the Pacific Cinémathèque in Vancouver, and the Canadian Film Institute in Ottawa.
