= Black Bridge =

- Directed by: Kevin Doherty
- Written by: Kevin Doherty
- Produced by: Kevin Doherty
- Cinematography: Kevin Doherty; Brett Howe
- Music by: Goathorn; Betrayer
- Distributed by: Winnipeg Film Group
- Release date: July 14, 2006
- Running time: 108 minutes
- Country: Canada
- Language: English
- Budget: CAD $6,000

Black Bridge is an independent 2006 comedy-drama film from Canada and was written and directed by Kevin Doherty. It was shot (and re-shot) over the course of 2002 and 2003 with practically no budget. The film is a period piece that takes place in May 1984 Canada during the height of heavy metal music popularity. The film's soundtrack featured music by Winnipeg metal acts Lawsuit and Labyrinth along with Canadian metal acts Goat Horn, Betrayer, Kick Axe, Thor, Anvil, Helix, Brighton Rock, Trained Bears and the American group Geronimo!

== Cast ==
- Adam Smoluk as Adrian Downing
- Raimey Gallant as Kathy Osbourne
- Jason Malloy as Clive DuBrow
- Mike Silver as Eddie Elliot
- Jennifer Pudavick as Tracey Roth
- James Clayton as Brian 'Gomer' Young (as Clayton Champagne)
- Orlando Carriera as Sammy Rhoades
- Natasha Reske-Naurocki as Lisa
- David Stuart Evans as Mr. Simmons
- Spencer Maybee as Vinny Gay
- Mike Cunningham as Bruce 'Pug' Pugnowski
- Zenon Hudyma as Blackie
- Kierin Kocourek as Mikey Gay
- Kelly Wolfman as Patricia Butler
- Alan MacKenzie as Neil Ward

== Reception ==
Canuxploitation was generally positive in their review of Black Bridge, writing "Though a few false acting notes are hit, Black Bridge still manages to weave several naturally unfolding stories into a decisively emotional narrative, even working in some very funny flashes of dark humor. A worthy effort deserving of a goat-horn salute or two." The Winnipeg Free Press was mixed in their review, stating "I can't really give Black Bridge a big thumbs-up, but I can throw it a few devil-horns for the crazed fervour with which it descends into high school headbanging culture, circa 1984."
