= Robert Harlow (writer) =

Canadian writer and former academic (born 1923)

Robert Harlow (born November 19, 1923) is a Canadian writer and former academic, best known for his 1972 novel Scann.

== Background ==
Harlow was born in Prince Rupert, British Columbia, but raised primarily in Prince George.

He served in the military during World War II as a bomber pilot, and then attended the University of British Columbia and the University of Iowa. He worked for the Canadian Broadcasting Corporation from 1951 to 1965, much of that time as the director of radio operations for British Columbia. He joined the faculty of the University of British Columbia in 1965 as head of its creative writing program. He married Margaret Latremouille, and was stepfather to broadcaster and actor Fred Latremouille, Margaret's son from her prior marriage.

== Writing ==
His debut novel Royal Murdoch (1962) was the first of what is called his Linden Trilogy, set in the fictional small British Columbia town of Linden. The other two novels in the trilogy were A Gift of Echoes (1965) and Scann. His later novels were Making Arrangements (1978), Paul Nolan (1983), Felice: A Travelogue (1985), The Saxophone Winter (1988) and Necessary Dark (2002).

He was also the writer of the screenplay for Larry Kent's 1965 film When Tomorrow Dies.

In 2001, he was presented with a lifetime achievement award by the Vancouver Public Library and BC Bookworld.

In the 2000s, with all of his novels out of print, he republished them all through Xlibris.
