= Magnificent Obsession (disambiguation) =

Magnificent Obsession is a 1929 novel by Lloyd C. Douglas.

Magnificent Obsession may also refer to:

== Film and TV ==
- Magnificent Obsession (1935 film)
- Magnificent Obsession (1954 film)
- Z Channel: A Magnificent Obsession, a film channel documentary
- Magnificent Obsessions, a Canadian documentary TV series

== Music ==
- Magnificent Obsession (album)
- "Magnificent Obsession", a song by Steven Curtis Chapman from the album Declaration
- "Magnificent Obsession", a song by the band Fehlfarben
