= 1985 Toronto International Film Festival =

Annual Canadian film festival

- Festival poster
- Opening film: Joshua Then and Now
- Location: Toronto, Ontario, Canada
- Hosted by: Toronto International Film Festival Group
- No. of films: 460 feature films
- Festival date: September 5, 1985–September 14, 1985
- Language: English
- Website: tiff.net
- 1986 1984

The 10th Toronto International Film Festival (TIFF) took place in Toronto, Ontario, Canada between September 5 and September 14, 1985. The festival featured 460 feature films, the highest number of films in festival.

Joshua Then and Now by Ted Kotcheff was selected as the opening film.

== Awards ==
Award	Film	Director
People's Choice Award	The Official Story	Luis Puenzo
Best Canadian Feature Film	Canada's Sweetheart: The Saga of Hal C. Banks	Donald Brittain
International Critics' Award	My American Cousin	Sandy Wilson
International Critics' Award	No Surrender	Alan Bleasdale

== Programme ==
=== Gala Presentations ===
English title	Original title	Director(s)	Production country
Colonel Redl	Oberst Redl	István Szabó	Hungary, West Germany, Austria
Death of a Salesman		Volker Schlöndorff	United States
Joshua Then and Now		Ted Kotcheff	Canada
The Journey of Natty Gann		Jeremy Paul Kagan	United States
Jagged Edge		Richard Marquand	United States
Kiss of the Spider Woman		Héctor Babenco	Brazil, United States
Maxie		Paul Aaron	United States
Mishima: A Life in Four Chapters		Paul Schrader	United States, Japan
The Official Story	La Historia oficial	Luis Puenzo	Argentina
Plenty		Fred Schepisi	United States
Twice in a Lifetime		Bud Yorkin	United States

=== Perspective Canada ===
English title	Original title	Director(s)	Production country
90 Days		Giles Walker	Canada
The Alley Cat	Le Matou	Jean Beaudin	Canada
Artie Shaw: Time Is All You've Got		Brigitte Berman	Canada
Canada's Sweetheart: The Saga of Hal C. Banks		Donald Brittain	Canada
Crime Wave		John Paizs	Canada
The Dame in Colour	La Dame en couleurs	Claude Jutra	Canada
Eastern Avenue		Peter Mettler	Canada
Jacques and November	Jacques et novembre	Jean Beaudry, François Bouvier	Canada
The Last Glacier	Le dernier glacier	Jacques Leduc, Roger Frappier	Canada
My American Cousin		Sandy Wilson	Canada
No Sad Songs		Nik Sheehan	Canada
On Land Over Water (Six Stories)		Richard Kerr	Canada
Pale Face	Visage pâle	Claude Gagnon	Canada
Samuel Lount		Laurence Keane	Canada
Transylvania 1917		Peter Dudar	Canada
A Trilogy		Barbara Sternberg	Canada

=== Contemporary World Cinema ===
- Adieu Bonaparte by Youssef Chahine
- Always by Henry Jaglom
- Cop au Vin (Poulet au vinaigre) by Claude Chabrol
- Dance with a Stranger by Mike Newell
- Deadhead Miles by Vernon Zimmerman
- Desert Hearts by Donna Deitch
- Dim Sum: A Little Bit of Heart by Wayne Wang
- The Funeral by Juzo Itami
- Insignificance by Nicolas Roeg
- Turtle Diary by John Irvin

=== Open Vault ===
English title	Original title	Director(s)	Production country
Back to God's Country		David Hartford	Canada
Becky Sharp		Rouben Mamoulian	United States
I Am a Fugitive from a Chain Gang		Mervyn LeRoy	United States
Way Down East		D. W. Griffith	United States

=== Unconfirmed program ===
- Broken Mirrors (Gebroken spiegels) by Marleen Gorris
- Chain Letters by Mark Rappaport
- Dear Karl (Lieber Karl) by Maria Knilli
- My Beautiful Laundrette by Stephen Frears
- No Surrender by Peter Smith
- Oriana by Fina Torres
- Seduction: The Cruel Woman by Elfi Mikesch and Monika Treut
- Singleton's Pluck by Richard Eyre
- A Strange Love Affair by Eric de Kuyper and Paul Verstaten
- When Father Was Away on Business by Emir Kusturica
