= Larry Kent (filmmaker) =

Canadian filmmaker (born 1937)

- Born: Laurence Kent; May 16, 1933 (age 93); Johannesburg, South Africa
- Other name: Laurence L. Kent
- Occupations: Film director Film producer Screenwriter
- Years active: 1962 - Present

Laurence Lionel "Larry" Kent (born May 16, 1933, in Johannesburg, South Africa) is a Canadian filmmaker regarded as an important pioneer of independent filmmaking.

== Biography ==
Larry Kent emigrated from South Africa to Vancouver, British Columbia, Canada in 1957 to study psychology and theatre at the University of British Columbia.

A devout film buff and scholar, Kent made the transition from the stage to screen in the early 1960s. Kent wrote and directed the existential Canadian indie, post-beatnik, pre-hippie classic The Bitter Ash in 1962 and tirelessly toured the film despite the controversy it garnered nationwide. Filled with profanity and brief nudity, the picture was produced on a shoestring, shot silent with audio dubbed in later and featured a jazz music score.

His follow-up film, Sweet Substitute (1964) made money in the United States, a first for any Canadian independent picture. Together with his third picture, the proto-feminist film When Tomorrow Dies, these three movies comprise Kent's "Vancouver Trilogy".

Kent moved to Montreal in the late 1960s, briefly working for the National Film Board of Canada before quitting to make films that exemplified the wild, drug informed spirit of the youth driven counterculture. His 1967 film High was slated to premiere at the Montreal International Film Festival, but was banned by the Quebec Censor Board at the last minute, while The Apprentice (1971) was one of the first films ever to directly address the linguistic and cultural tensions between anglophones and francophones in Montreal in that era.

Although none of these early films received wide distribution, his cultural and critical esteem began to increase when several of them were included in Front & Centre, a retrospective program of historically significant Canadian films which screened at the 1984 Toronto International Film Festival. The Bitter Ash, Sweet Substitute, When Tomorrow Dies and High were also screened as a Kent retrospective at a number of venues in 2002 and 2003, including Cinematheque Ontario in Toronto, the Pacific Cinémathèque in Vancouver and the Canadian Film Institute in Ottawa.

He also had occasional acting roles in other directors' films, including Q-Bec My Love (Un succès commercial) and One Man.

During the 1970s and throughout the 1980s, Kent continued to explore various aspects of the human condition in his work. Though he slowed down in the 1990s, he returned in 2005 with The Hamster Cage, a black comedy/psychodrama which won the jury prize at the 2005 Austin Fantastic Fest.

In 2007, Kent completed post-production work on Hastings Street, a 20-minute Vancouver drama which he had actually made in 1962 as his first-ever film but had never completed due to lack of funding.

In 2023, he is slated to receive the Fantasia Film Festival's Trailblazer Award for distinguished career achievement.

== Select filmography ==
- The Bitter Ash (1963)
- Sweet Substitute (1964)
- When Tomorrow Dies (1965)
- High (1967)
- Facade (1968)
- The Apprentice (1971)
- Keep It in the Family (1973)
- The Slavers (1977)
- Yesterday (a.k.a. This Time Forever) (1981)
- High Stakes (1986)
- Mothers and Daughters (1992)
- The Hamster Cage (2005)
- Hastings Street (1962 photography / 2007 post-production) 20:28
- She Who Must Burn (2015)
- Short Film No. 6 (2020)
