= You Take Care Now =

- Directed by: Ann Marie Fleming
- Produced by: Ann Marie Fleming
- Distributed by: Canadian Filmmakers Distribution Centre
- Release date: 1989
- Running time: 12 minutes
- Country: Canada
- Language: English

You Take Care Now is a 1989 Canadian short film, directed by Ann Marie Fleming. Made as a student project while she was studying filmmaking at the Emily Carr Institute of Art and Design, the film blends live action, animation and found footage to tell the story of two traumatic incidents from Fleming's own life, being sexually assaulted while travelling in Italy and being hit by a car while crossing the street at home in Vancouver.

The film won the award for Best Experimental Film at the 1989 Canadian Student Film Festival. It was subsequently screened at the 1989 Festival of Festivals.

In 1991 the film was broadcast by KCTS-TV, the PBS affiliate in Seattle, Washington, as part of Moving: Image Makers, a special highlighting short films by filmmakers from Washington and British Columbia.

In 2017 the film was included in Canada On Screen, the Toronto International Film Festival's special program of significant films from throughout the history of Canadian cinema, which was staged as part of Canada 150.
