= Gimme Some Truth Documentary Festival =

The Gimme Some Truth Documentary Festival is an annual documentary film festival in Winnipeg, Manitoba. Organized by the Winnipeg Film Group since 2008, the event is staged annually at the Cinematheque theatre.

The event is a qualifying festival for the Canadian Screen Awards.
