= Peter Jordan (presenter) =

Canadian actor and television presenter

- Born: Canada
- Occupations: Actor, musician, television presenter

Peter Jordan (also known as Rocki Rolletti) is a Canadian actor, musician, and television presenter. He is best known for the work series It's a Living, which aired on CBC Television from 1989 to 2003.

== Career ==
Jordan was based in Winnipeg, Manitoba, for many years, where he was a regular contributor to the local CBWT's news and documentary programs 24Hours and 24Hours Late Night in the 1980s.

In 1986, using his Rocki Rolletti persona, Jordan helped to forge a cultural link between pink flamingo lawn ornaments and the working-class suburb of Transcona, Winnipeg, with his satirical song "Transcona Anthem".

In 1981 Peter Jordan wrote and starred in the stage rock-musical, Enoch Horn, a story about a reclusive, retired rock star who is recruited back to public life to run for the position of Manitoba Provincial Premier by unscrupulous handler Bob La Blau (which is consistently pronounced as Bah Blah Blah).

Jordan won the 1998 and 2000 Gemini Awards for Best Host Lifestyle or Performing Arts Program or Series for his work on It's a Living, from four nominations over its run.

When the full hour of news returned to CBWT in Winnipeg on February 19, it was announced that Jordan would host a new segment called W6 (Who, What, When, Where, Why, Winnipeg).

In addition to his work on television as a host and news reader, Jordan played roles in films and television series filmed in Manitoba, including: the 1986 historical film Mistress Madeleine; the 1996 Showtime television movie Heck's Way Home, starring Alan Arkin; the 2006 episode "Family Portrait" of Falcon Beach; the 2007 Canadian drama film The Stone Angel, starring Ellen Burstyn; the 2008 thriller The Lazarus Project, starring Paul Walker and Piper Perabo; and the 2009 romantic comedy New in Town, starring Renée Zellweger and Harry Connick Jr.

== Discography ==
Year	Title	Label	Notes
1992	Do The Rolletti	Oak Street Music	The band is also known as: Rocki Rolletti And The Junior Noodle Wave

== Filmography ==
=== Film ===
Year	Title	Role	Notes
1982	Oak, Ivy, and Other Dead Elms	Brock	
1986	Mistress Madeleine	Vicar	
2000	Nostradamus	Red Mabus	
2002	Rhapsody in White	Gospodin Brunschweis	
2006	Population 436	Minister Hiller	
2007	The Stone Angel	Henry Pearl	
2008	The Lazarus Project	Male Tech	
2008	The Golden Boys	Ezekial	Uncredited
2009	New in Town	Edwin Schuck	
2010	Foodland	George Leap	
2012	Zettl	Dr. Hendrik Schafmon	

=== Television ===
Year	Title	Role	Notes
1989-2004	It's a Living	Host	
1995	My Life as a Dog	Blue Man	Episode: "A Day in the Life"
1996	Heck's Way Home	Hotel Manager	Television film
1997, 2000	The Adventures of Shirley Holmes	Abe	2 episodes
2006	Falcon Beach	Gerald	Episode: "Family Portrait"
