= The Milkman Cometh =

1988 Canadian short film

- Directed by: Lorne Bailey
- Written by: Lorne Bailey
- Produced by: Lorne Bailey
- Starring: Kerry Kyle
- Distributed by: Winnipeg Film Group
- Release date: 1988
- Running time: 19 minutes
- Country: Canada

The Milkman Cometh is a Canadian black comedy short film, directed by Lorne Bailey and released in 1988. The film centres on an office worker (Kerry Kyle) who becomes transfixed by the bucolic nature scene on a can of milk at the coffee machine.

The film received a Genie Award nomination for Best Live Action Short Drama at the 10th Genie Awards in 1989.
