= Patricia Gage =

Scottish actress (1940–2010)

- Born: 3 March 1940; Glasgow, Scotland
- Died: 31 January 2010 (aged 69); Canada
- Occupation: Actress
- Years active: 1963–2006
- Spouse: Paxton Whitehead (m. 1971; div. 1986)
- Children: 1

Patricia Gage (3 March 1940 – 31 January 2010) was a Scottish-born actress based in Canada.

Gage has had roles in televised productions since the mid 1960s. In 1977, she played the role of Dr. Roxanne Keloid in David Cronenberg's horror film Rabid. During the 1980s, she mostly worked in American and Canadian TV productions. From 1998 to 1999, she played Lucy Becker in the TV series Highlander: The Raven. In later years she also worked as a voice actress.

== Personal life ==
She was married to Paxton Whitehead from 1971 to 1986. She had one daughter.

== Death ==
On 31 January 2010, Gage died in the hospital from cancer.

== Filmography ==
=== Film ===
- 1965: When Tomorrow Dies as Gwen James
- 1973: Keep It in the Family as Celia Sayers
- 1974: Why Rock the Boat? as Isobel Scannell
- 1977: Rabid as Dr. Roxanne Keloid
- 1987: Hello Again as Bejewelled Woman
- 1990: Perfectly Normal as Mrs. Hathaway
- 1991: Pure Luck as Secretary
- 1992: I'll Never Get to Heaven as Trea O'Doyle
- 1995: First Degree as Margeaux Pyne (direct to video)
- 1997: Dinner at Fred's as Aunt Bonnie
- 2000: American Psycho as Mrs. Wolfe
- 2000: Waking the Dead as Fielding's Mother
- 2005: Anne: Journey to Green Gables as Marilla Cuthbert (voice) (direct to video)
- 2006: Franklin and the Turtle Lake Treasure as Old Turtle (English version, voice) (final film role)

=== Television ===
Patricia Gage television credits
| Year | Title | Role | Notes |
|---|---|---|---|
| 1963 | The Littlest Hobo | Mary Riley | 1 episode |
| 1973 | The Return of Charlie Chan | Sylvia Grombach | TV Movie |
| 1974 | Performance | Unknown | 1 episode |
| 1979 | King of Kensington | Mrs. Enright | 1 episode |
| 1987 | As the World Turns | Corinne Lawrence | 8 episodes |
| 1988 | Diamonds | Unknown | 1 episode |
| 1988–1993 | Street Legal | Judge Morton | 8 episodes |
| 1989 | Looking for Miracles | Grace Gibson | TV Movie |
| 1990 | The Little Kidnappers | Mrs. MacKenzie | TV Movie |
| 1990 | Maniac Mansion | Elinor Edison | 1 episode |
| 1990 | Counterstrike | Amanda | Episode: "Masks" (S1.E16) |
| 1991 | Road to Avonlea | Mrs. Hardy | 1 episode |
| 1992 | Child of Rage | Laurel | TV Movie |
| 1993 | Secret Service | Jo Ann Hinckley | 1 episode |
| 1993 | Class of '96 | Eleanor Palmer | 1 episode |
| 1993 | Family Passions | Camilla Haller | |
| 1993 | The Substitute | Principal Beatty | TV Movie |
| 1993 | E.N.G. | Connie Antonelli | 2 episodes |
| 1994 | Thicker Than Blood: The Larry McLinden Story | Judge Lara Parkes | TV Movie |
| 1994 | Side Effects | Rina Himmel | 1 episode |
| 1995 | TekWar | Eleanor LaFeare | 1 episode |
| 1995 | The Silence of Adultery | Olive | TV Movie |
| 1996 | A Brother's Promise: The Dan Jansen Story | Gerry Jansen | TV Movie |
| 1996 | Hostile Advances | Mrs. Ellison | TV Movie |
| 1996 | The Morrison Murders: Based on a True Story | Aunt Clare | TV Movie |
| 1996 | Dangerous Offender: The Marlene Moore Story | Maureen Woodcock | TV Movie |
| 1996 | Traders | Unknown | 1 episode |
| 1997 | Goosebumps | Aunt Dahlia | Episode: "An Old Story" (S3.E6) |
| 1997 | While My Pretty One Sleeps | Ethel Lambston | TV Movie |
| 1998 | Earth: Final Conflict | Rachel Purcell | Episode: "The Devil You Know" (S1.E17) |
| 1998–1999 | Highlander: The Raven | Lucy Becker | 9 episodes |
| 2000 | Twice in a Lifetime | Mrs. Gerson | 1 episode |
| 2000 | The Miracle Worker | Aunt Ev | |
| 2000–2002 | Anne of Green Gables: The Animated Series | Marilla Cuthbert (voice) | 22 episodes |
| 2001–2003 | Doc | Irene Hart | 3 episodes |
| 2002–2003 | Street Time | Mary Hunter | 5 episodes |
| 2002 | Tracker | Judge Harriet Chapin | 1 episode |
| 2002 | Queer as Folk | Virginia Hammond | 2 episodes |
| 2003 | Miss Spider's Sunny Patch Kids | Betty Beetle (voice) | TV Movie |
| 2003 | Going For Broke | Grandma Lois Bancroft | TV Movie |
| 2003 | Penguins Behind Bars | Matron Hruffwater (voice) | TV Movie |
| 2003 | Finding John Christmas | Eleanor McAllister | TV Movie |
| 2004–2006 | Miss Spider's Sunny Patch Friends | Betty Beetle (voice) | 12 episodes |
| 2006 | Puppets Who Kill | Aunt Bambi | 1 episode |
