= Psychout for Murder =

1973 film

- Directed by: Rossano Brazzi
- Written by: Biagio Proietti; Diana Crispo
- Produced by: Oscar Brazzi
- Starring: Adrienne La Russa; Rossano Brazzi; Nino Castelnuovo; Paola Pitagora
- Cinematography: Luciano Trasatti
- Edited by: Amedeo Giomini
- Music by: Benedetto Ghiglia
- Release date: 1969
- Country: Italy
- Language: Italian

Psychout for Murder (Italian: Salvare la faccia, lit. 'To save face') is a 1969 thriller film directed by Rossano Brazzi under the pseudonym Edward Ross.

== Cast ==
- Adrienne La Russa as Licia Brignoli
- Rossano Brazzi as Marco Brignoli
- Nino Castelnuovo as Mario
- Paola Pitagora as Giovanna Brignoli
- Alberto de Mendoza as Francesco
- Idelma Carlo as Laura
- Renzo Petretto as Paterlini
- Néstor Garay as the politician
- Marcello Bonini Olas as Monsignor
- Nerio Bernardi as the waiter

== Production ==
The film was an Italian-Argentine co-production between Chiara Film, Banco Film, and Glori Art.

== Release ==
The film was released in Italian cinemas by PAC in the early 1969. It was released in the United States in 1971 with an R rating from the MPAA. The American version of the film included new sex scenes by Brazzi as well as inserts by Ted Kneeland.

== Reception ==
A contemporary Variety review noted: "if you were watching this film without any regard for sense or substance, you'd have a reasonably good time" with its "very level artsy montage" but "a flat or inane dialog". Vincent Canby wrote: "It can't make up its mind whether it's a peep show, a mystery or a suspense melodrama, and so more or less compromises by immediately failing at everything."
