= Sweet Substitute (film) =

- Directed by: Larry Kent
- Written by: Larry Kent
- Produced by: Larry Kent
- Starring: Bob Howay; Angela Gann; Carol Pastinsky; Lanny Beckman
- Cinematography: Richard M. Bellamy
- Edited by: Shelah Reljic
- Music by: Jack Dale
- Production company: Larry Kent Productions
- Distributed by: Joseph Brenner Associates
- Release date: November 1964
- Running time: 81 minutes
- Country: Canada
- Language: English

Sweet Substitute, retitled Caressed in the United States, is a Canadian drama film, directed by Larry Kent and released in 1964.

The film centres on Tom (Bob Howay), a high school student whose efforts to secure an academic scholarship to university are complicated by his sexual compulsions. He is caught in a love triangle between Elaine (Angela Gann), a prim and proper girl who is saving herself for marriage, and Kathy (Carol Pastinsky), a more sexually available girl whom Tom impregnates.

It was a Canadian Film Award nominee for Best Picture at the 17th Canadian Film Awards in 1965, but did not win.

It was part of a retrospective screening of Kent's films, alongside The Bitter Ash, When Tomorrow Dies and High, which screened at a number of venues in 2002 and 2003, including Cinematheque Ontario in Toronto, the Pacific Cinémathèque in Vancouver and the Canadian Film Institute in Ottawa.
