= Adrienne La Russa =

American actress (born 1948)

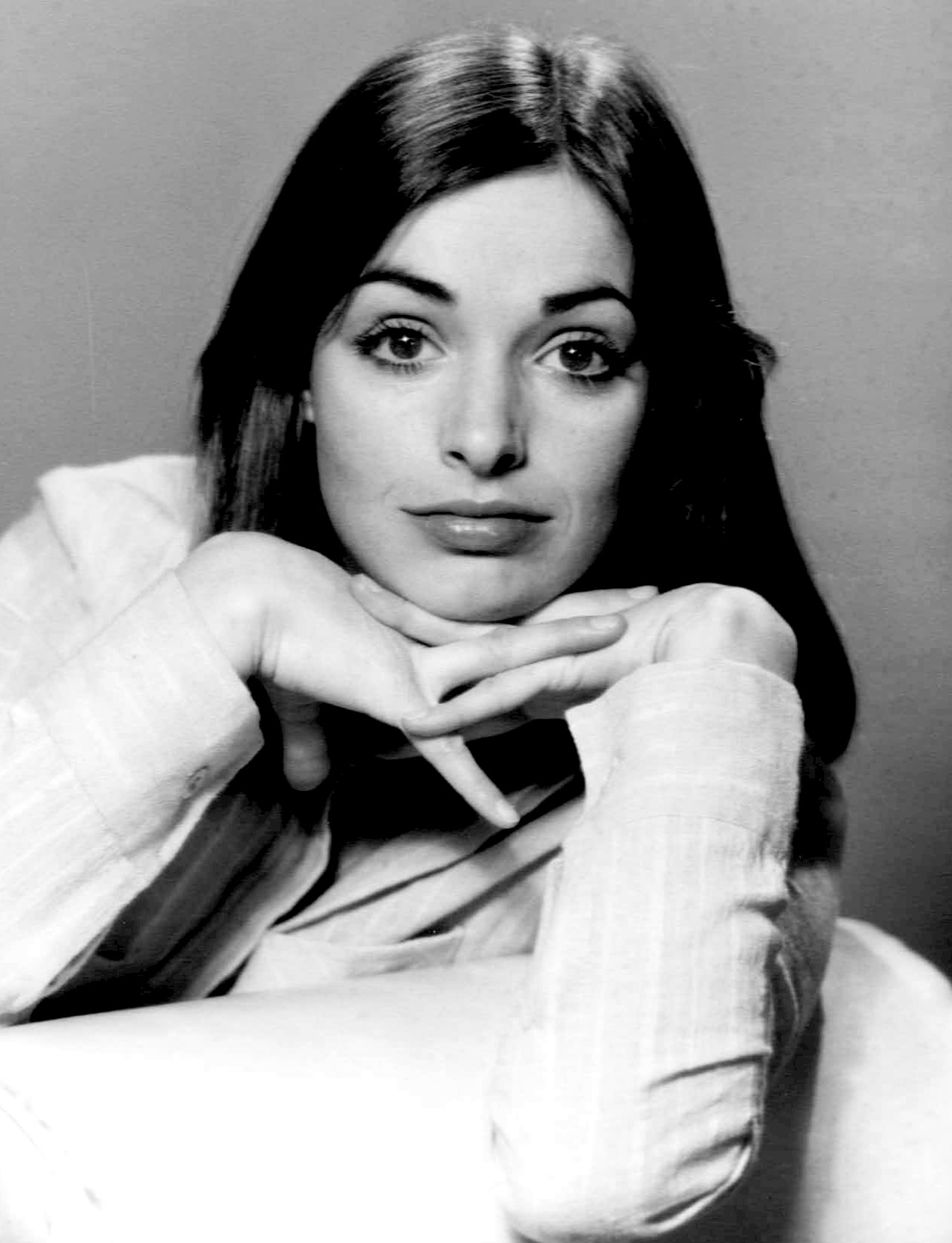
- La Russa in 1975
- Born: May 15, 1948 (age 78); New York City, U.S.
- Education: Cold Spring Harbor High School
- Occupation: Actress
- Years active: 1968–1991
- Known for: Days of Our Lives; Beatrice Cenci; The Man Who Fell to Earth; Centennial; The Amazing Spider-Man; Logan's Run; The Black Sheep
- Spouses: Steven Seagal (m. 1984; ann. 1984); Robert French (m. 1987)

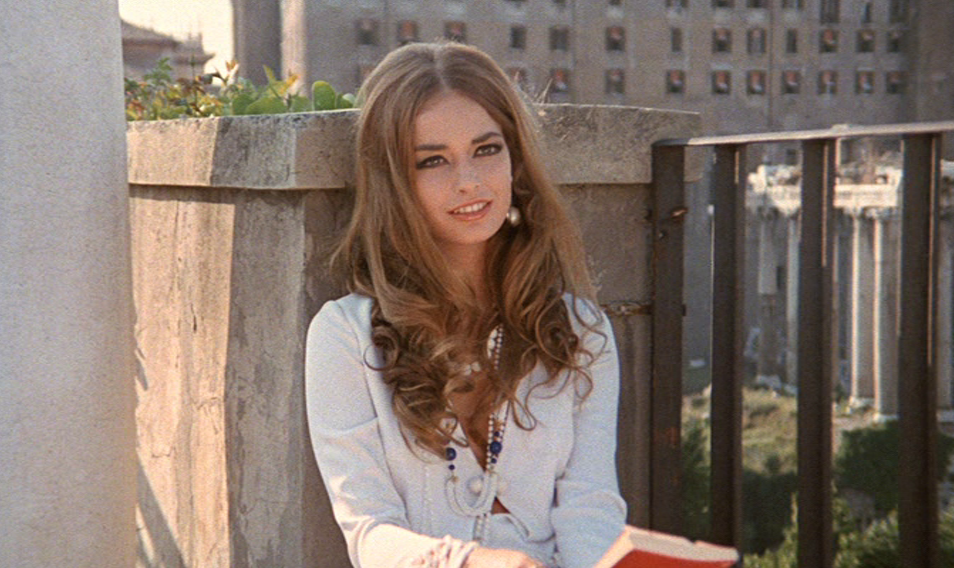
Adrienne La Russa in The Black Sheep (1968)

Adrienne La Russa (born May 15, 1948) is an American retired actress known for her role as Brooke Hamilton on Days of Our Lives, which she played from 1975 to 1977. Her film career included roles in The Black Sheep (1968), Beatrice Cenci (1969), Keep It in the Family (1973), The Man Who Fell to Earth (1976) and Uncle Joe Shannon (1978).

She also made a few guest appearances on television in the late 1970s and early 1980s and she had a supporting role in the 1978 miniseries Centennial. La Russa played Clemma Zendt, the tempestuous daughter of series protagonists Levi and Lucinda Zendt.

== Personal life ==
La Russa was born in New York City, New York, where a childhood friend was fellow future actor Henry Winkler. She graduated from Cold Spring Harbor High School in Cold Spring Harbor, New York, on Long Island.

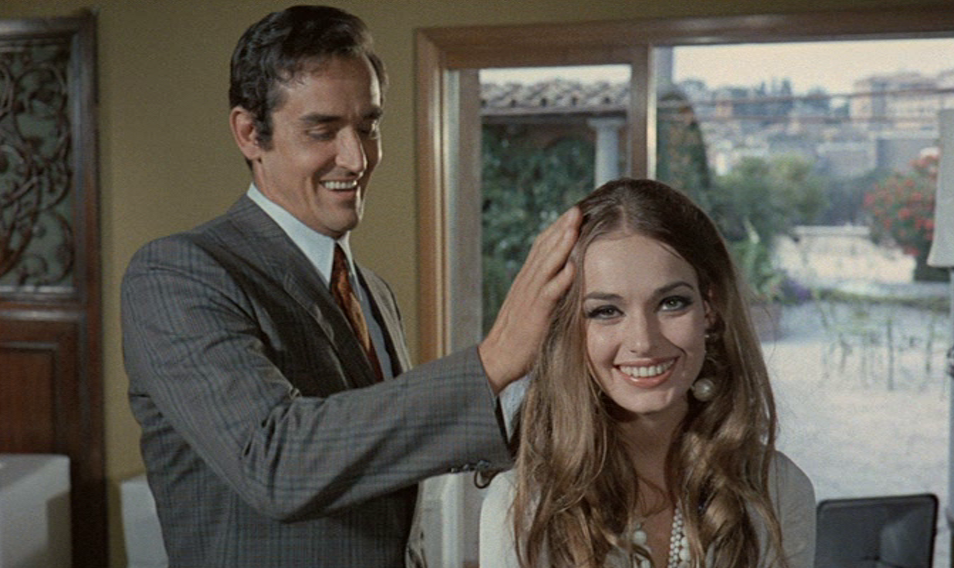
Adrienne La Russa and Vittorio Gassman in The Black Sheep (1968)

Her 1984 marriage to actor and martial artist Steven Seagal was annulled that same year. She married Robert French on December 31, 1987.

== Filmography ==
=== Film ===
Year	Title	Role	Notes
1968	The Black Sheep	Kitty	Italian title: La pecora nera
1969	Psychout for Murder	Licia	Italian title: Salvare la faccia
1969	Beatrice Cenci	Beatrice Cenci	also known as: The Conspiracy of Torture
1973	Keep It in the Family	Karen Sayers	
1976	The Man Who Fell to Earth	Helen	
1976	Hanno ucciso un altro bandito	Diane	
1978	Uncle Joe Shannon	Peggy	

=== Television ===
Year	Title	Role	Notes
1974	The Streets of San Francisco	Kerry Martin	Episode: "Flags of Terror"
1974	The Manhunter	Marion Liggett	Episode: "A.W.O.L. to Kill"
1975	McCloud	Claire Harrison	Episode: "Fire"
1975–1977	Days of Our Lives	Brooke Hamilton	265 episodes
1977	Baretta	Carla Trancata	Episode: "Carla"
1977	Logan's Run	Sylvia Reyna	Episode: "Crypt" (as Adrienne LaRussa)
1978	Project U.F.O.	Cynthia Staley	Episode: "Sighting 4006: The Nevada Desert Incident"
1978	The Amazing Spider-Man	Trina Pandit	Episode: "The Curse of Rava"
1978	Switch	Miki	Episode: "Formula for Murder" (as Adrienne LaRussa)
1978–1979	Centennial	Clemma Zendt	3 episodes
1979	Charlie's Angels	Claudia Harper	Episode: "Angels at the Altar"
1979	A Man Called Sloane	Serena	Architect of Evil (as Adrienne LaRussa)
1981	The Misadventures of Sheriff Lobo	Tess	Episode: "What're Girls Like You Doing in a Bank Like This?"
1982	Terror at Alcatraz	Janine	TV movie
1983	General Hospital	Ida	
1991	Jake and the Fatman	Mary Powell	Episode: "Come Along with Me" (as Adrienne LaRussa)
