= Keep It in the Family (film) =

1973 film by Larry Kent

- Directed by: Larry Kent
- Screenplay by: Edward Stewart
- Story by: Edward Stewart; Larry Kent
- Produced by: John Dunning; André Link
- Starring: John Gavin; Patricia Gage; Adrienne La Russa
- Cinematography: Roger Moride
- Edited by: Larry Kent
- Music by: Paul Baillergeon
- Production companies: DAL Productions; Kit Films; Canadian Film Development Corporation
- Distributed by: Cinepix
- Release date: April 13, 1973
- Running time: 91 minutes
- Country: Canada
- Language: English
- Budget: $450,000 CAD$

Keep It in the Family (French: Les Cocus) is a 1973 Canadian sex comedy film starring John Gavin, Patricia Gage, Adrienne La Russa and directed by Larry Kent.

== Plot ==
A young couple, Karen Sayers and Alex McDonald (Adrienne La Russa and Alan McRae), are fed up with the disorganized grime of student ghetto living and decide they are ready for their own apartment. When denied financial assistance by their parents, they devise an ingenious plan for revenge: Karen will seduce Alex's father Roy McDonald (John Gavin) and Alex will do the same with Karen's mother Celia Sayers (Patricia Gage). Karen lands a job as Roy's private secretary; she is an instant hit with her boss and soon enough, the two land in a downtown hotel room. Meanwhile, at the Sayers' residence, Alex is hired as the new gardener and diverts his attention to Celia. But all is not well, for Celia feels great remorse and orders him out of the house.

Alex wants to call off the deception, but Karen finds herself falling in love with Roy and so she spends her time wining, dining and sneaking back to the student quarter in the wee hours of the morning. Incensed by the news that in his latest affair, Roy is robbing the cradle, his wife Estelle (Sheena Larkin) files for divorce. Roy soon tries to cool his relationship with Karen only to find that she is pregnant and he agrees to marriage. However, he is too exhausted by her rugged schedule of tennis, golf, swimming and jogging to absorb the good news that her condition was a false alarm.

The wedding plans proceed smoothly until Roy brings Alex to the Sayers' house and Celia realizes that her ex-gardener is her future son-in-law's son! She confesses all to Roy in his office and then drives off at top speed, oblivious to the fact that world's most accident-prone policeman is in hot pursuit. Following an hilarious car chase, Roy and Celia confess their love for each other. The wedding proceeds as scheduled and in the true tradition of romantic farce, all dilemmas are resolved: Alex is joyfully reunited with Karen, Roy rides off into the sunset with Celia and even Karen's father finds consolation with a delectable blonde.

== Cast ==
- John Gavin as Roy McDonald
- Patricia Gage as Celia Sayers
- Alan McRae as Alex McDonald
- Adrienne La Russa as Karen Sayers
- Kenneth Dight as Noel Sayers
- Sheena Larkin as Estelle McDonald
- Gillie Fenwick as Mr. Peabody

== Production ==
Keep It in the Family was shot from September 13 to October 22, 1972, in and around Montreal, Quebec, Canada and partially shot in the residential area of Westmount Square in Westmount, Quebec. On April 3, 1973, John Gavin attended the film's world premiere at the Westmount Square Cinema in Quebec.

== Home media ==
Keep It in The Family was released on VHS in the 1980s by CIC Video but has long been out of print. To date, it has not yet been released on DVD.
