= It's a Living (Canadian TV series) =

- Genre: Reality
- Created by: Peter Jordan
- Written by: Laurie Hoogstraten, Peter Jordan, Terry Stapleton, Ryszard Hunka
- Directed by: Terry Stapleton, Ryszard Hunka
- Presented by: Peter Jordan
- Theme music composer: Peter Jordan
- Composer: Peter Jordan
- Country of origin: Canada
- Original language: English
- No. of seasons: 5
- No. of episodes: 81

Production
- Executive producers: John Baker, Carl Karp, Christian Cote
- Producers: Terry Stapleton, Ryszard Hunka
- Production locations: Winnipeg, Manitoba, Canada
- Editors: Greg White, Gil Tetrault
- Running time: 30 mins
- Production company: Canadian Broadcasting Corporation

Original release
- Network: CBC Television
- Release: 1989 – 2004

It's a Living is a Canadian reality television series broadcast on CBC Television. In the series, Peter Jordan, the host, tries all sorts of jobs, from the mundane to the unusual, that belong to different Canadians. It's a Living was produced by CBWT in Winnipeg, Manitoba.

Jordan won 2 Gemini Awards for Best Host in 1998 and 2000. The show was cancelled in October 2004.

== See also ==
- List of films and television shows shot in Winnipeg
