= The Bitter Ash =

- Directed by: Larry Kent
- Written by: Larry Kent
- Produced by: Larry Kent
- Starring: Alan Scarfe; Lynn Stewart; Philip Brown
- Cinematography: Dick Bellamy
- Edited by: Dick Bellamy; Larry Kent
- Music by: Jack Dale; Wilf Manz; Clint Solomon; Jimmy Thomas
- Production company: Larry Kent Productions
- Release date: 1963
- Running time: 80 minutes
- Country: Canada
- Language: English

The Bitter Ash is a Canadian drama film, directed by Larry Kent and released in 1963. One of the first narrative feature films ever shot in Vancouver, the film stars Alan Scarfe as Des, an unhappy blue-collar man who is drawn into the city's counterculture underground, where he clashes with bohemian intellectual Colin (Philip Brown) over the affections of Colin's wife Laurie (Lynn Stewart).

The film was controversial at the time because it depicted sexual activity, brief nudity, profanity and drug use. Unable to secure commercial distribution, Kent exhibited the film by personally undertaking a cross-Canada tour to screen it on university campuses. The film has often been characterized by critics as an exploitation film, but Kent himself disputed this characterization on the grounds that it didn't have enough sex in it. The Globe and Mail also later wrote that "the story of the collision of bohemian and working-class values in provincial, pre-countercultural Vancouver, today seems less striking for its formerly transgressive content - sex, extramarital pregnancy, pot-smoking and nudity - than for its fiercely expressed attitude of utter socioeconomic despair."

== Production ==
Kent made the film while he was a student at the University of British Columbia, and the film was acted primarily by university drama students rather than professional actors. The film was in production from June to August 1963, at a cost of $5,000 (equivalent to $50,994 in 2025).

== Release ==
The film was shown at the University of British Columbia in October 1963, and made its budget back after two weeks of screenings. The film later received screenings at the 1984 Toronto International Film Festival in the Front & Centre program, and at the 2012 Toronto International Film Festival in the Cinemathèque program. It was also part of a retrospective screening of Kent's films, alongside Sweet Substitute, When Tomorrow Dies and High, which screened at a number of venues in 2002 and 2003, including Cinematheque Ontario in Toronto, the Pacific Cinémathèque in Vancouver and the Canadian Film Institute in Ottawa.

== Works cited ==
- Turner, D. John, ed. (1987). Canadian Feature Film Index: 1913-1985. Canadian Film Institute. ISBN 0660533642.
- Duffy, Dennis (1986). Camera West: British Columbia on Film 1941-1965. British Columbia Archives. ISBN 0771884796.
