= Jacki Ochs =

American filmmaker

- Born: 1951
- Education: San Francisco Art Institute (BFA)
- Occupations: director; producer; professor
- Years active: 1975–present

Jacki Ochs is an American documentary filmmaker. Ochs has been producing and directing film and various hybrid forms for over thirty years.

== Career ==
Ochs began her career in New York City in the mid-70's making short experimental works and doing cinematography and photography for Anthony McCall, JoAnne Akalaitis, Robin Winters, Dennis Oppenheim, and Yvonne Rainer.

In 1976 Ochs joined with St. Louis experimental jazz musicians Lester Bowie, Joseph Bowie and Charles "Bobo" Shaw to establish the Human Arts Association. The Human Arts Association (HAA) is an independent 501(c)(3) charity, which has sponsored concerts, dance and poetry performances. Ochs has served as the executive director of HAA since 1980.

Ochs produced, directed and shot the award-winning investigative film Vietnam: The Secret Agent — a look at the history, the effects and the implications of Agent Orange during the Vietnam War. Premiering at the New York Film Festival (1983), it went on to receive a Special Jury Prize at Sundance Film Festival, John Grierson Award for Best New Director from the American Film Festival, Certificate of Special Merit, Academy of Motion Picture Arts and Sciences (1984) and wide theatrical release through First Run Features. Some other films produced, directed and edited by Ochs include Jazz Summit (1987) and Letters Not About Love (1998), a collaboration with poets Lyn Hejinian and Arkadii Dragomoshchenko, and scored by Larry Ochs (musician) which garnered Best Documentary Feature at its South by Southwest premiere.

As a producer, Ochs has partnered twice with director Susanna Styron on 9/12: From Chaos to Community (2006) and Out of My Head (2017). She produced and executive produced Kristi Zea's Emmy-nominated Everybody Knows... Elizabeth Murray (2016), which premiered at the Tribeca Film Festival. She executive produced Keith Beauchamp (filmmaker)'s NAACP and Emmy-award winning Untold Story of Emmett Louis Till (2005).

Ochs is Professor Emerita of Film and Video, Pratt Institute. She is a member of the Academy of Motion Pictures Arts and Sciences.

== Select awards ==
- Guggenheim Foundation, Fellowship (2001)
- New York Foundation for the Arts (NYFA), Film Fellowship (1987)
- MacDowell Colony, Fellowship (1987)
