= Richard Kerr (artist) =

- Born: February 3, 1952 (age 73); St. Catharines, Ontario, Canada
- Education: Sheridan College

Richard Kerr (born 3 February 1952) is a Canadian filmmaker, visual artist and professor. Since the late 1970s, Kerr developed his practice across diverse media including analog film and digital video. Kerr is a faculty member at Concordia University in Montreal, where he teaches experimental filmmaking.

== Life and career ==
Kerr, who grew up in a sports-loving family, left high school without graduating to pursue a career as a professional hockey player. Eventually, he discovered photography which led him to study filmmaking. Kerr's early films were associated with the "Escarpment School," a group of avant-garde filmmakers that began at Sheridan College in Ontario in the late 1970s. Others in the School included Philip Hoffman, Steve Sanguedolce, Gary Popovich, Carl Brown and Louise Lebeau.

In the late 1980s Kerr made various trips to the American Southwest to shoot black and white film in the desert and in Los Angeles, material that later would lead to two of his most important films Last Days of Contrition (1988), and Cruel Rhythm (1991).

== Later years ==
In the mid-1990s, Kerr's practice began including installation. He was interested in exploring the materiality of film. He started working with digital video "sketching" and "motion picture weaving." His weaving involves gathering old Hollywood feature films, trailers and filmstrips of his own outtakes. The material is often chemically altered through studio processes before being woven and sealed between layers of glass that is then mounted in custom fluorescent back-lit light boxes. Kerr's motion picture weavings deal with formal concerns of material and composition through creating visual abstractions of the original cinematic representations.

== List of works ==
- Hawkesville to Wallenstein (6 min, 16mm/35mm, 1976)
- Vesta Lunch (11min, 16mm, 1978)
- Luck is the Residue of Desire (20 min, 16mm, 1981)
- Canal (22min, 16mm, 1982)
- On Land over Water (Six Stories) (60 min, 16mm, 1984)
- The Last Days of Contrition (35 min, 16mm, 1988)
- Cruel Rhythm (40 min, 16mm, 1991)
- The Machine in the Garden (20 min, 16mm, 1991)
- Plein Air Etude (5 min, 16mm, 1991)
- McLuhan (60 min, video, 1993) Plein Air (20 min, 16mm, 1991)
- The willing voyeur... (77 min, 35mm Dolby SR, 1996)
- Never confuse movement with action... (the self-fictionalization of Patrick Hemmingway) (50 min, video, 1998)
- Human tragedy on a grand scale (50 min, digital video, 1999)
- Pictures of Sound (20 min, digital video, 2000)
- I was a strong man until I left home... (27 min, digital video, 2000)
- Collage d’Hollywood (8 min, 35mm, 2003)
- Hollywood décollage (9 min, 35mm-digital, 2004)
- Le bombardement le porte des perles (9min, 35mm-digital, 2004)
- Demi-Monde (80 min, 35mm dual projector slide projection, 120 slides, 2004)
- universe of broken parts (10 min, digital video, 2007)
- action:study (5 min, 16mm-digital, 2008)
- deMouvement (6 min, 35mm, 2009)
- HouseArrest (18 min, digital video, 2012)
- Morning... Came a Day Early (9min, 16mm-digital video, 2015)
- T/ Demi-Monde (5:42:00 min, 35mm-digital video, 2015)
