= Kevin Doherty (filmmaker) =

Canadian filmmaker, playwright and writer

- Born: Canada
- Occupations: Film director, writer

Kevin Doherty is an independent filmmaker, playwright and writer from Winnipeg, Manitoba.

== Stage work ==
- Lester Gets KISSed (2008, wrote and directed, collaboration with Alan MacKenzie)
- The Green Room (2010, wrote and directed, collaboration with Scott Cranwill)
- Brain Cravers: The Curse of Extollo (2011/2014, wrote and directed, collaboration with Scott Cranwill)

== Filmography ==
=== Feature films ===
- Black Bridge (2007)
- Wild Turkeys (2008)
- Lights Camera BLOOD! (2015)

=== Short films ===
- Toaster Toaster on the Wall (1998)
- I Come in Pieces (2000)
- Something for Santa (2002)
- Green Screen (2009, co-written and co-directed with Alan MacKenzie)
- The Jogger (2015)
