= One Man =

One Man may refer to:

- One Man (Mark King album), 1998
- One Man (Tank album), 2002
- One Man (1977 film), a 1977 Canadian film
- One Man (2026 film), a 2026 Indian film
- One Man (horse), an Irish Thoroughbred racehorse
- "One Man", a song by R. Kelly from R. (R. Kelly album)
- Steve Harvey: One Man, a 2001 stand-up comedy special
