= Top of the Food Chain =

- Theatrical poster
- Directed by: John Paizs
- Written by: Phil Bedard; Larry Lalonde
- Produced by: Suzanne L. Berger; Jana Edelbaum
- Starring: Campbell Scott; Fiona Loewi; Tom Everett Scott
- Cinematography: Bill Wong
- Edited by: Bert Kish
- Music by: David Krystal
- Distributed by: Red Sky Entertainment
- Release date: 1999
- Running time: 99 minutes
- Country: Canada
- Language: English

Top of the Food Chain is a 1999 Canadian comedy-horror film directed by John Paizs and starring Campbell Scott, Fiona Loewi, and Tom Everett Scott. A parody of alien invasion movies of the 1950s, it was released on video in the United States under the title Invasion!

The film's villains are carnivorous humanoids who search for victims while posing as traveling salesmen.

== Plot ==
The film revolves around a vacationing atomic scientist who encounters mysterious carnivorous beings disguised as traveling salesmen who are feeding on the eccentric population of the small isolated town of Exceptional Vista.
