= Reason Over Passion =

1969 Canadian film

- Directed by: Joyce Wieland
- Written by: Joyce Wieland
- Produced by: Joyce Wieland
- Cinematography: Joyce Wieland
- Edited by: Joyce Wieland
- Distributed by: Canadian Filmmakers Distribution Centre
- Release date: June 28, 1969
- Running time: 80 minutes
- Country: Canada
- Language: English

Reason Over Passion (French: La raison avant la passion) is a Canadian experimental film, directed by Joyce Wieland and released in 1969. A reflection on Pierre Trudeau's famous public statement that he valued reason over passion in his approach to governing Canada, the film deconstructs the concept by blending news footage of Trudeau at the 1968 Liberal Party of Canada leadership election with tracking shots of the Canadian landscape, as the letters in the subtitle "reason over passion" rearrange and scramble into 537 nonsensical anagrams over the course of the film.

== Production ==
Wieland worked on the film from 1967 to 1969. Wanting to capture Canadian landscapes under a range of seasonal and weather conditions, she began in Cape Breton Island and travelled west across Canada. The Vancouver Art Gallery held a retrospective of Wieland's work in early 1968, which she used as an opportunity to complete filming. The animated lettering was created by Hollis Frampton, who set up a device in his darkroom to quickly photograph each of the permutations.

The film was also indirectly linked to a quilting project that Wieland first exhibited in 1968, which included quilts stitched with both the English "Reason Over Passion" and French "La Raison Avant La Passion" mottos.

== Critical response ==
Jacob Siskind of the Montreal Gazette contrasted the film against the work of Wieland's husband, artist Michael Snow, writing that "in his picture frames, which are after all inanimate, Mr. Snow has crammed his canvasses with movement, motion and tension. In her movie frames, which are constantly in motion, Mrs. Snow has so completely infused the film with relentless motion that it has become totally static."

For the Toronto Star, Barrie Hale wrote that "the Canada that Wieland shows is a desolate place, featured by roads and train tracks and farms and trucks (and so, by implication, cities) but seen in dawn light, or dusk, or through storms—the time of dreams. Her land is one that is still marked with the capacity to wonder, and it is a gruelling experience to cross it—a tough trip, as it were."

== Legacy ==
The film was screened in the Directors' Fortnight program at the 1970 Cannes Film Festival.

In 2017, it was included in Canada On Screen, the Toronto International Film Festival's special screening series of culturally or artistically significant Canadian films from the history of Canadian cinema.
