= Patricia Gruben =

American filmmaker

- Born: 1947 (age 78–79); Chicago, Illinois
- Occupation: Filmmaker
- Years active: 1979-present
- Notable work: Sifted Evidence; Low Visibility; Deep Sleep; Ley Lines

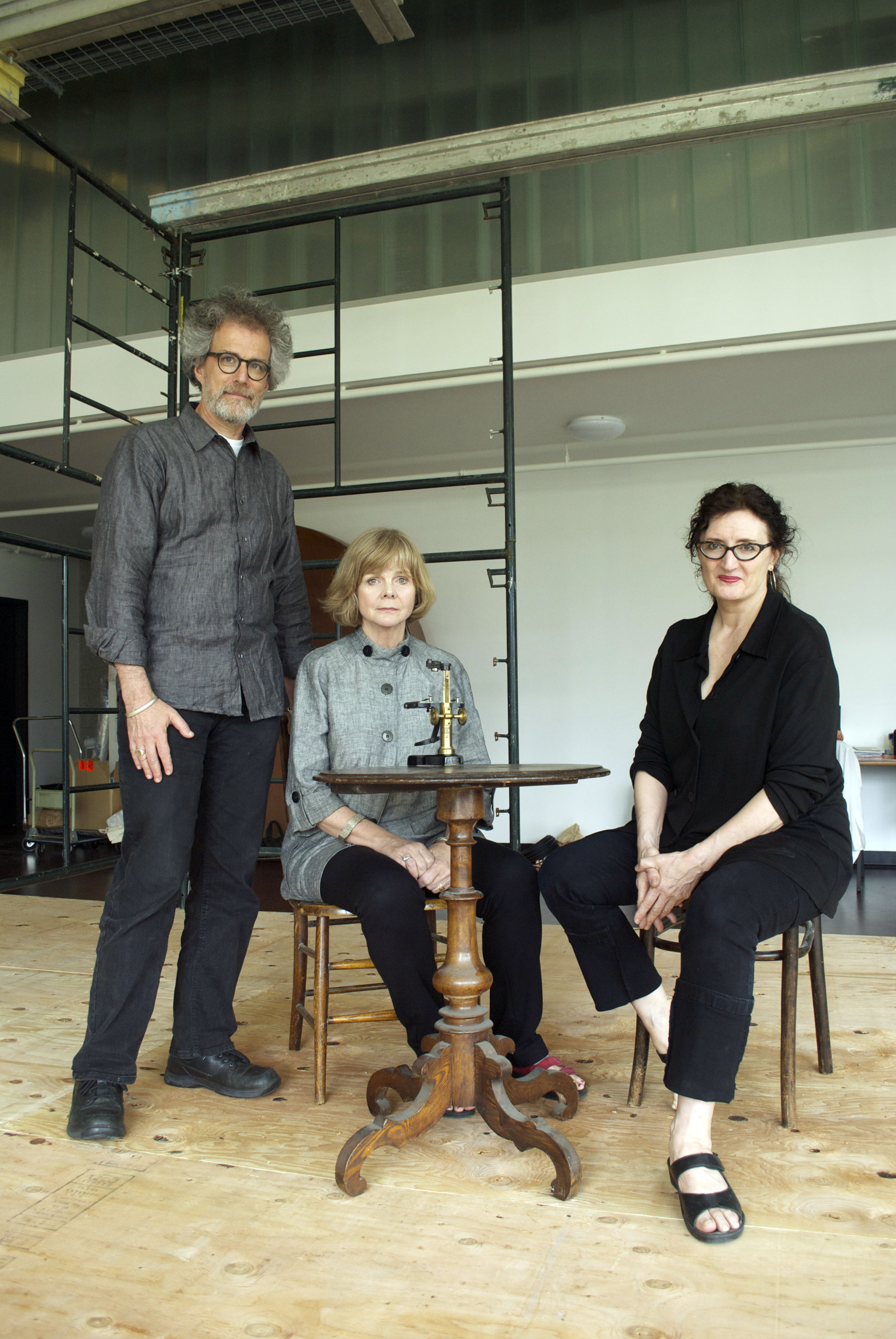
SFU professors Martin Gotfrit and Patricia Gruben, and set designer Marian Wihak

Patricia Gruben is an American-born filmmaker who taught film studies at Simon Fraser University in British Columbia, Canada until 2018. As a director, she has made four feature films and several shorts. Gruben has worked in many different positions within the film industry, from being a property master to directing a feature film. In 2015, Gruben was the recipient of the Teamsters 155 Woman of the Year Award given by Vancouver Women in Film and TV.

== Biography ==
Gruben was born in Chicago, Illinois in 1947. She attended Rice University where she studied anthropology. Gruben went on to attend the University of Texas where she studied film. After completing her graduate studies, she moved to Toronto in the early 1970s. Over the following years, Gruben worked in different fields of the film industry, from commercials to productions designed for children. Over the course of her career, she has worked as a director, an editor, an assistant director, a cinematographer, a propmaster, an art director, a writer, a set decorator, and a producer.

== Career ==
Her first film made after completing school, The Central Character (1979), was short. The Women’s Companion to International Film, edited by Annette Kuhn and Susannah Radstone, states that it "received immediate attention as the work of a major new figure in Canada’s Avant-Garde." Gruben went on to make a forty-minute experimental short, Sifted Evidence (1982), which received international attention from festivals. After its screening at the New York Film Festival, Sifted Evidence earned an Honorable Mention in J. Hoberman's Top Ten list for the Village Voice.

Gruben worked for ten years in Toronto as a set decorator on projects like Spasms (1982), a horror film directed by William Fruet, before initiating her own first feature. She wrote and directed Low Visibility (1984), a nonlinear mystery featuring a man who had apparently lost his memory and ability to communicate. She also wrote and directed Deep Sleep (1990), a psychological thriller starring Megan Follows (Anne of Green Gables), and Ley Lines (1993), a documentary about the fiction we create from our family history, following her own imaginary lineage from Texas to Germany and the Canadian Arctic.

Gruben began to teach at Simon Fraser University in 1982. In 1987, she and Colin Browne founded the Praxis Centre for Screenwriters. The program was part of the Simon Fraser University’s School for the Contemporary Arts, which received funding from both the government of British Columbia and the university. The purpose of the program was to assist Canadian screenwriters by providing the opportunity to work with professionals in the industry. In 2013, a Globe and Mail article announced that the program would end in 2014 due to a lack of funding. However, it was adopted by the Whistler Film Festival, where it continues as the WFF Screenwriters Lab

In addition to filmmaking, Gruben has created The Secret Doctrine, a play about the Russian occultist Helena Blavatsky, which was staged in Vancouver in 2013, starring Gabrielle Rose; and an accompanying art installation, The Veil of Nature, which simulated the laboratory of Oliver Lodge, a 19th-century physicist, and occult scientist.

As an associate professor at Simon Fraser University, Gruben taught courses in film production, screenwriting, and film studies, specializing in nonlinear narrative and Indian cinema. During this time she published numerous scholarly articles on film, literature and cultural studies while developing several screenplays. Since leaving SFU in 2018, she has made two films: the short drama Floating Islands (2019) and the hybrid feature film Heart of Gold (2023).

She has been on the executive board of the Hari Sharma Foundation and the South Asian Film Education Society since 2012, and has served on numerous other boards and arts juries. From 2015-2019 she was on the permanent jury for the Daryl Duke Prize. She is married to composer Martin Gotfrit and has two sons, both musicians and community workers.

== Awards ==
Gruben received the Teamsters 155 Woman of the Year Award in 2015 from Women in Film and Television, a not-for-profit organization that hosts the awards. The award requires that the recipient be "a woman who has achieved significant success in the field of film or television, and who is recognized for mentoring other women in the industry."

== Filmography ==
- The Central Character (1979)
- Sifted Evidence (1982)
- Low Visibility (1984)
- Deep Sleep (1990)
- Ley Lines (1993)
- Before it Blows (1997)
- Floating Islands (2019)
- Heart of Gold (2023)
