= Randolph Peters =

Canadian composer

Randolph Peters (born 28 December 1959) is a Canadian composer who is known for his output of roughly 100 film scores made mostly for Canadian films.

== Early life and education ==
Peters was born in Winnipeg, Manitoba. He graduated from the University of Winnipeg and the Jacobs School of Music at Indiana University.

== Career ==
Peters wrote a large amount of music for Canadian television, radio, dance and theatre. From 1996 to 2001 he was the composer-in-residence and curator for the Winnipeg Symphony Orchestra; he also served as the director of that symphony's annual New Music Festival.

Peters composed several operas for the Canadian Opera Company, of which the most successful was The Golden Ass, which was created with novelist Robertson Davies shortly before Davies' death. After Davies' death, COC director Richard Bradshaw worked with Peters to finalize the opera. The opera premiered in Toronto at the Hummingbird Centre in April, 1999.

== Selected works ==
- Meditation and celebration (1985)
- Dreaming-tracks : 1991 (1991)
- Crime wave (1985)
- Dancing on wings of fire : for diatonic button accordion (A/D) and orchestra (1994)
- Guiltless blood (1990)
- Sonata for violin and piano (1990)
- The golden ass (1999)
- Survivors : a mass for mezzo-soprano and string quartet (1994)

== Sources ==
- "Randolph Peters". The Canadian Encyclopedia.
