= Magnificent Obsessions =

Canadian television series

Magnificent Obsessions is a Canadian documentary TV series that ran in 2002 and 2003 on the Life Network. The series ran in six-parts. It was shot on location in Canada, England, Romania and the Netherlands. The series told the stories of six people with obsessive fixations ranging from investigating the Sasquatch, building the world's most elaborate sandcastles and studying Dracula.

The series was directed by Shereen Jerret in Winnipeg, Manitoba, Canada.
