= Crime Wave (1985 film) =

- Directed by: John Paizs
- Written by: John Paizs
- Produced by: John Paizs
- Starring: Eva Kovacs; John Paizs; Darrell Baran
- Cinematography: John Paizs
- Edited by: Jon Coutts; Gerry Klym; John Paizs
- Music by: Randolph Peters
- Production company: Favorite Films
- Distributed by: Norstar Releasing
- Release date: 11 September 1985 (TIFF)
- Running time: 80 minutes
- Country: Canada
- Language: English

Crime Wave, also known as The Big Crime Wave, is a 1985 Canadian independent surrealist comedy film written, produced and directed by Winnipeg-based filmmaker John Paizs.

It was shot principally in 1984 and premiered at the 1985 Festival of Festivals, although Paizs subsequently opted to reshoot the ending, which had received more mixed reaction at TIFF than the rest of the film, before it received limited followup commercial release.

The film lacked a major release in Canada and abroad, and remained almost as a "curiosity" that a few fans and movie critics remembered fondly. Over time, word-of-mouth and some retrospective showings at film festivals helped Crime Wave to achieve a bigger notoriety, and it is currently considered a cult film.

== Plot ==
The film is a homage to late 1940s-early 1950s "Colour Crime Pictures" (A fictional sub-genre). Paizs plays Steven Penny, a struggling screenwriter who lives above the garage of a suburban family, and begins typing each night from the moment the street lamps come on. Everything we learn about the character comes from Kim Brown (Eva Kovacs), the family's daughter, who has a schoolgirl crush on him, as Steven never utters a word in the entire film.

Steven is able to write beginnings and endings, but not middles. Every morning he deposits his attempts at writing his film "Crime Wave" in the trash which Kim retrieves. The movie depicts these endings and beginnings, as well as very short disconnected scenes from the middle. Steven's scripts always begin by introducing several characters from various geographic regions finally settling on the film's protagonist "from the North". The hero is pursuing some sort of dream, but suddenly commits a violent act at the spur of the moment. The film always ends with the protagonist's sudden graphic death.

Kim starts to spend time with Steven. He teaches her the basics of "Colour Crime" films, and shows her his film equipment. As time goes on Steven starts to write less. Kim narrates that if Steven can't actually finish his script he'll give up on film, and possibly his life. That night Steven again fails at finishing his script, and resolves to not leave his bed until he starves to death. Kim leaves several meals outside his door, but when she opens the door to push one of the meals inside she sees that Steven's space is infested with rats. Kim's parents call an exterminator, and invite Steven to stay in their guest room for a few days until the rats are gone.

The next day Kim's parents invite Steven to a costume party. Steven has a hard time mingling with the guests. Kim then introduces Steven to Lyle, the son of the couple throwing the party. Lyle is also mute, and is fixated on dinosaurs and planets. Lyle takes Steven and Kim to the trailer where he works counting passing cars for the city of Winnipeg's traffic department.

Steven rides a bike around town, and witnesses the aftermath of a car crash. He also sees some men in a truck attack a man on a skateboard. That night Steven imagines the various protagonists of Crime Wave hanging out in his apartment. The next morning Steven throws out his typewriter. As Kim chases after the remains of the typewriter she finds a copy of "Colour Crime Quarterly", which has an ad from Dr. C Jolly asking for someone to collaborate on a script with him. Kim gathers up Steven's rejected script pages, and submits them to Jolly claiming to be Steven.

A few days later a letter arrives from Dr. Jolly explaining that all Steven needs are twists to improve his scripts, and inviting Steven to come to Sales Kansas to collaborate. Kim excitedly shows this to Steven. After a brief celebration Steven leaves after Kim tells him to send her postcards during his trip. Kim then explains via narration that Dr. Jolly went insane shortly after placing his ad, and committed a series of brutal crimes.

Ignorant of the danger, Steven travels from Winnipeg to Kansas. 10 miles from Sales he's stopped by a roadblock. The town has been quarantined due to a deadly biological agent that has gotten loose from a nearby military base, and nobody is allowed inside until the military has cleared the area. Dr. Jolly is also stopped, and the body in his trunk is almost discovered.

Steven decides to walk around the military perimeter. As night falls he stops under a streetlight, and is met by Dr. Jolly who also decided to walk around the military perimeter. Dr. Jolly lunges at Steven.

Kim wakes up certain that something terrible has happened to Steven. She then assures us via narration that Steven not only survived his encounter with Dr. Jolly, but was struck by a streetlight that unlocked his ability to write again. Steven then arrives in Kim's bedroom with the streetlight still on his head, and proceeds to write a final version of Crime Wave.

The final script begins by introducing Steven as a top director of Colour Crime films, and ends with Steven leaving a final message on his typewriter : "I really did mean to be good". The middle covers Stevens rise to fame as a director, and his many successes. Kim explains in a final piece of narration that she is going to help Steven write the middles of his stories, and that they'll become successful together. Kim calls out to Steven who has been just out of sight during her narration sequences. We see Steven sharpening a knife, he then approaches Kim menacingly, and suddenly gives her a cake.

== Cast ==
- Eva Kovacs as Kim Brown
- John Paizs as Steven Penny
- Darrell Baran as Ronnie Boyles
- Jeffrey Owen Madden as Skip Holliday
- Tea Andrea Tanner as Dawn Holliday
- Mark Yuill as Stanley Falco (as Mark Hunter)
- Neil Lawrie as Dr. C. Jolly (as Neal Lawrie)
- Bob Cloutier as Mr. Brown
- Donna Fullingham as Mrs. Brown (as Donna Fillingham)
- Mitch Funk as Young Dad
- Angela Heck as Young Mom

== Style ==
The film is designed to emulate the look and feel of educational films from the period. Randolph Peters includes a flute and glockenspiel-based score emulating such films (the film concludes with a song based on this theme that discusses the possibility of Steven and Kim getting married sung by a small 1950s-style pop chorus). When Steven Penny is brought into some shady deals, the film takes on more of a neo noir look and sound, inflected with surrealism. One of the film's signature images is the one of a street lamp smashed over Steven's head, which he wears home.

== Critical response ==
Jay Scott wrote that "If the great Canadian comedy ever gets made, Winnipeg director John Paizs, whose first full-length feature, Crime Wave, received its world premiere at the Festival of Festivals, may be the filmmaker to do it: Paizs has a unique, off-centre sensibility. When he's cooking, he sizzles." He praised the first hour of the film but wrote that it fell apart in the final 20 minutes, which provided part of the impetus for Paizs to reshoot the ending.

In 2023, Barry Hertz of The Globe and Mail named the film as one of the 23 best Canadian comedy films ever made.
