= John Paizs =

Canadian director, writer and actor (born 1957)

- Born: 1957 (age 68–69); Winnipeg, Manitoba, Canada
- Occupations: Film director, screenwriter, actor
- Notable work: Crime Wave

John Paizs (born 1957 in Winnipeg, Manitoba) is a Canadian film director, writer and actor. He is most noted for his debut feature film, Crime Wave, which was presented at the 1985 Toronto International Film Festival. He was the male lead and also wrote and directed the film.

A key figure in the Winnipeg Film Group, he directed a number of short films prior to Crime Wave. He first became known for The Obsession of Billy Botski, a short film about a man obsessed with Connie Francis; while the Three Worlds of Nick trilogy (Springtime in Greenland, Oak, Ivy, and Other Dead Elms and The International Style) was originally intended as a single film but produced and released as three short films due to Paizs's limited budget.

The Nick trilogy starred Paizs himself as the titular character, a "quiet man" who never speaks a word in any of the three films. The "quiet man" character was also seen in The Obsession of Billy Botski and Crime Wave, although he had a different name in those films. Paizs first developed the "quiet man" character concept because budgetary limitations largely forced him to appear in his own films instead of hiring a lead actor, but he disliked the sound of his own voice and did not feel that he had any acting talent.

Following Crime Wave, Paizs worked primarily as a television director on various series until returning to film in 1999 with Top of the Food Chain, a sendup of science fiction B-movies in which an incompetent scientist tries to thwart an alien invasion.

In recent years he has been an instructor and mentor at the Canadian Film Centre. In 2024, he appeared in the anthology film series Castration Movie.

== Legacy ==
Paizs was a key influence on Guy Maddin, who cited The Obsession of Billy Botski as inspiring him to make his own short film debut with The Dead Father in 1985.

In 2008, Toronto's Royal Cinema mounted a retrospective of Paizs' films, including Springtime in Greenland, Crime Wave and Top of the Food Chain. Norman Wilner of Now wrote that "Imagine the playful whimsy of Guy Maddin without the fetish for old silent films and you're on your way to understanding Paizs's sensibility. His features offer straight-faced deconstructions of film noir and 1950s sci-fi tropes, with characters operating on just the wrong side of self-awareness as they navigate increasingly bizarre situations. Oh, and they're funny."

In 2017, Springtime in Greenland was selected for inclusion in Canada On Screen, the Toronto International Film Festival's retrospective of Canadian cinema which was staged as part of Canada 150.

== Filmography ==
- The Nine-to-Five Crack (1974)
- Ho Down (1976)
- The Dreamer (1978)
- Highway 61 Revisited (1978)
- The Obsession of Billy Botski (1980)
- Springtime in Greenland (1981)
- Oak, Ivy, and Other Dead Elms (1982)
- The International Style (1983)
- Crime Wave (1985)
- The Kids in the Hall (1988, TV series)
- Maniac Mansion (1990, TV series)
- The Adventures of Shirley Holmes (1996, TV series)
- Once A Thief (1997, TV series)
- Top of the Food Chain (1999)
- Marker (2005)
- Castration Movie (2024–2025, acting role)
