= Barbara Sternberg =

Canadian film director

- Born: March 24, 1945 (age 81); Toronto, Ontario, Canada
- Occupation: Film director

Barbara Sternberg (born in 1945) is a Canadian film director known for her experimental films. She directed films such as Opus 40 (1979), Transitions (1982), At Present (1990), Through and Through (1992), and Midst (1997).

== Early life ==
Sternberg was born in Toronto, Ontario on April 24, 1945. In her youth, she created art by writing books for her family members. She has said that her use of photos and text in these books is "similar to the way I work now." She created her first film using her father's 16 mm camera in order to make a gift for her husband. Sternberg said, "My husband at the time didn't have any home movies and barely any photographs from his growing-up; so I wanted to make him this home movie, to create a past for him."

Although she did not initially consider her films works of art, she eventually began to take them seriously. Sternberg attended Ryerson Polytechnic University to learn how to make films, but she ignored the teachings in order to make experimental films. "I didn't think at all about industrial film," she said. "I just started making stuff in a way I would later learn to call 'experimental.'"

== Career ==
Sternberg began her career in filmmaking during the mid-1970s and was one of the few female directors in Canada working in the avant-garde genre at the time. She has received significant national attention in Canada. The National Gallery of Canada, the Art Gallery of Ontario, Queen's University, and York University have all acquired her films for their collections.

Aside from her national recognition, Sternberg's films have also been featured in various international institutions, such as Museum of Modern Art in New York City and the Centre Georges Pompidou in Paris.

== Directing techniques ==
When she began her career, Sternberg transferred Super 8 images onto 16mm in order to modify the original image to give her films an imperfect finish. This distinguishing filming technique was used to give authenticity to her films. By making her films look like moving photographs, she was able to "turn reality into image".

Due to her interest in "images that bear the traces of life, body, and the materiality of film", Sternberg's films blurred the line between reality and fiction. Although Sternberg's films were initially characterized by her unique filming technique, she eventually began to utilize modern technology and incorporate it into her directing. By switching from "single channel video, to installation, to hand processed 16mm, to digital media and performance", Sternberg is thoroughly "engaged in finding the links between technological process and aesthetic production."

== Contribution to the Canadian experimental film scene ==
Through her contribution to the Canadian experimental film scene, Sternberg helped pave the way for other experimental female directors in Canada. As William Wees notes, "Women were, at best, marginally represented in the world of Canadian experimental film when Sternberg started making films. The recognition they received was instrumental in opening a predominantly male preserve to the work of female film and video-makers, many of whom have profited from her trail-blazing efforts without, I suspect, realizing who helped to open the way for them".

Sternberg also contributed to the Canadian experimental film scene by incorporating "a female aesthetic sensibility" into her films. As a result, Sternberg was able to bring a female perspective to Canadian experimental cinema that was not present before.

== Filmography ==
Year	Title
1974	The Good Times
1976	A Study in Blue and Pink
1979	The Cuten Spielers
1979	Opus 40
1980	' ... The Waters Are the Beginning and the End of All Things'
1981	(A) Story
1982	Transitions
1985	A Trilogy
1989	Tending Towards the Horizontal
1990	At Present
1991	Through and Through
1995	Beating
1996	What Do You Fear?
1997	C'est la vie
1997	Midst
1997	Past/Future
2000	Awake
2000	For Virginia
2000	Like a Dream that Vanishes
2000	Off the 401
2001	4 Women
2001	Breaking Out of the play
2002	Burning
2002	New York Counterpoint
2002	Sunsets
2003	Glacial Slip
2003	Jakarta
2003	(Rome) Skyling
2003	Tabula Rasa
2004	In the Garden
2004	So What?
2005	Dark
2005	Praise
2005	Surfacing
2007	Once
2007	Time Being I
2007	Time Being II
2007	Time Being III
2007	Time Being IV
2008	After Nature
2008	Beginning
2010	Love, Winnipeg
2011	In the Nature of Things
2011	(Vers)ing
2013	Reading Thomas Bernhard
2020	Once I Am

== Accolades ==
Year	Award	Festival	Nominated work	Result
1980	Best Experimental Film	International Super 8 Festival	Opus 40	Won
1982	Best Experimental Film	Atlantic Film Festival	Transitions	Won
1982	Best Sound	Atlantic Film Festival	Transitions	Won
1993	Award of Excellence	Ann Arbor Festival	Through and Through	Won
2011	Governor General's Award in Visual and Media Arts			Won
