= The Cinematheque =

Cinema in Vancouver, British Columbia, Canada

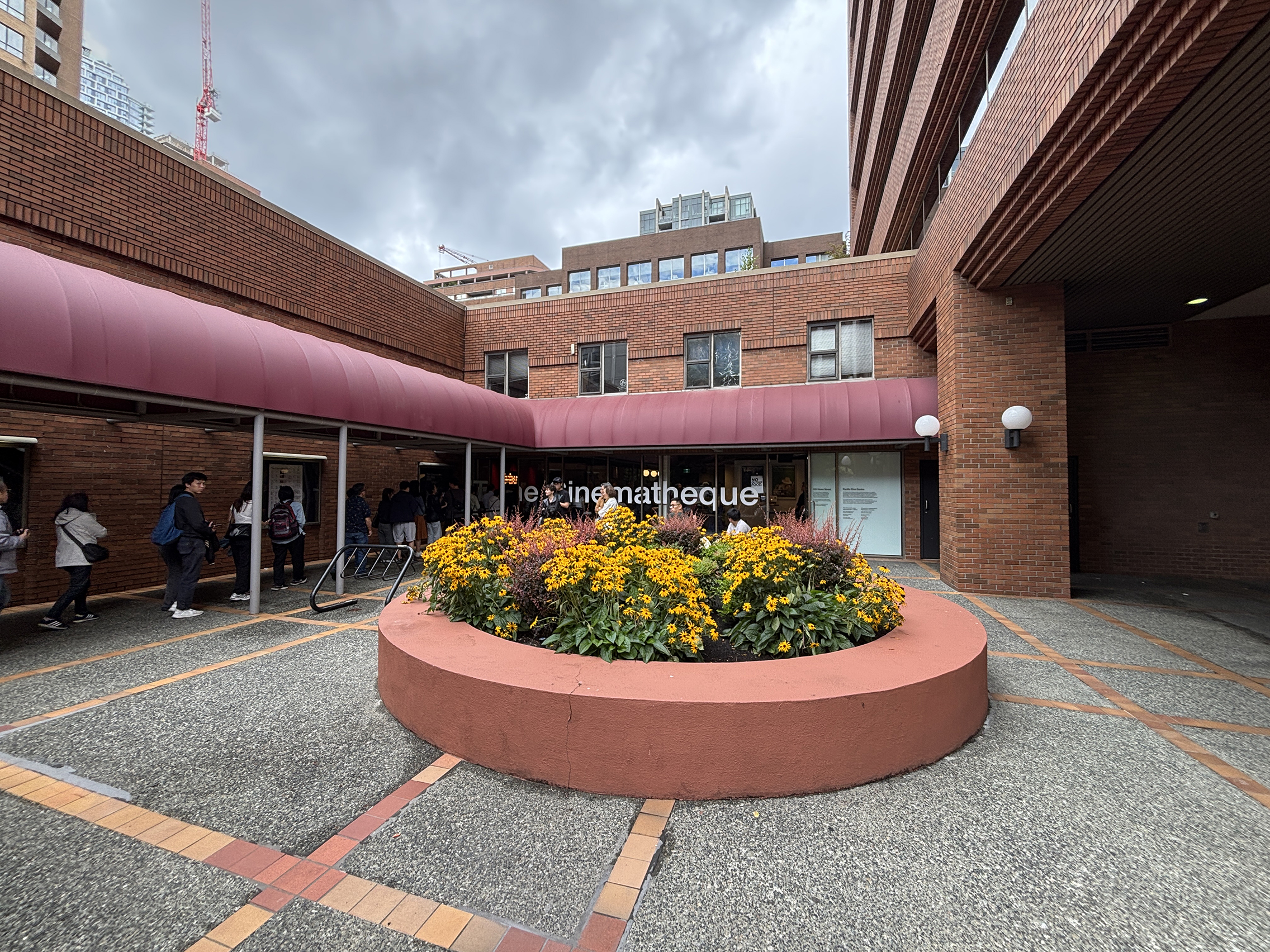
- The Cinematheque at 1131 Howe Street
- Interactive map of The Cinematheque
- Address: 1131 Howe Street; Vancouver, British Columbia
- Capacity: 153
- Type: cinema, film archive

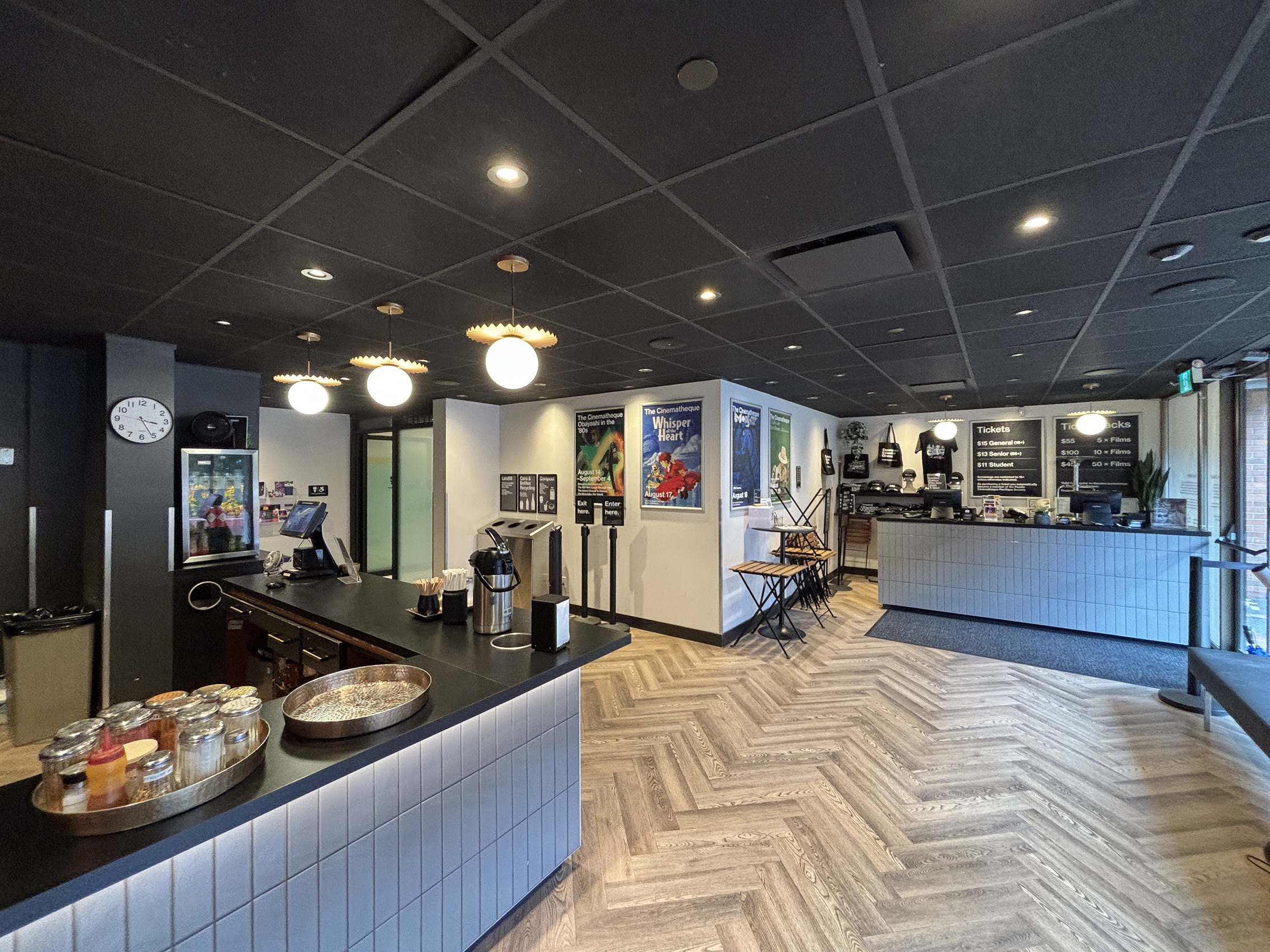
Lobby

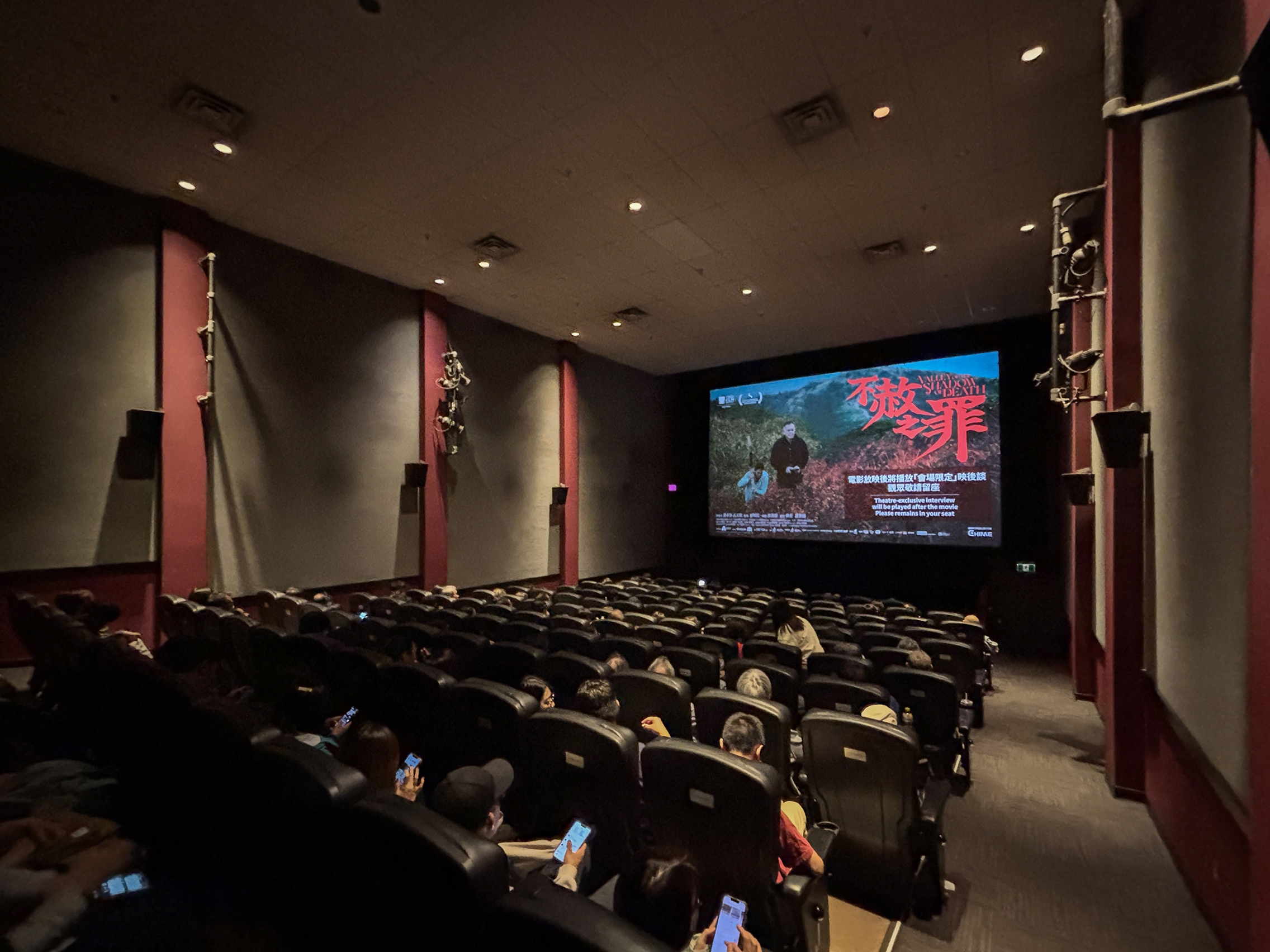
Theatre

The Cinematheque (legal name: Pacific Cinémathèque Pacifique), founded in 1972, is a Canadian charity and non-profit film institute, media education centre, and film exhibitor based in Vancouver, British Columbia.

The organization's mission is to foster the appreciation of the art and legacy of cinema, and to advance critical thinking and thoughtful education about the impact of moving-images and screen-based media in society.

== Programs and collections ==
The Cinematheque offers a year-round program of curated film exhibitions (more than 500 screenings annually) devoted to important classic and contemporary Canadian and world cinema, and encompassing film and moving images in their various narrative/dramatic, documentary, animated, and experimental forms. These presentations include retrospectives of important directors, significant national cinemas, and historical film movements; new Canadian and international films; revivals and restorations of masterpieces of world cinema; major international touring exhibitions; showcases of avant-garde and other artist-driven moving-image work; and guest appearances by filmmakers, film historians, and cultural critics.

The Cinematheque's public activities also include an array of educational outreach programs aimed at students, educators, and others in the community, including instruction in film history and film aesthetics and in media literacy; professional development for teachers of media arts; and film- and video-production training for children and teenagers, including in-school programs and summer movie-making camps. In addition, the organization has published a series of print and digital study guides intended for classroom use and devoted to more than thirty different topics in film history, film aesthetics, and media education, including subjects such as "Visual Storytelling and the Grammar of Filmmaking"; "Indigenous Voices in Canadian Cinema"; "Women in Film"; "The French New Wave"; and "Filmmaking by Youths with Disabilities."

The Cinematheque's collections include a Film Reference Library housing several thousand film-related books, periodicals, and other materials; and a West Coast Film Archive made up of some 2,000 motion pictures, held in 16mm and 35mm prints. The majority of titles in the archive are Canadian films. A core collection of several hundred significant British Columbian works dating from 1968 to 1978, the period of the first major wave of independent and avant-garde filmmaking in Vancouver, includes films by key West Coast film artists such as David Rimmer, Al Razutis, Byron Black, Ellie Epp, Phillip Borsoso, Sandy Wilson, Sturla Gunnarsson, Al Sens, Tom Braidwood, Peter Lipskis, and Kirk Tougas. The Cinematheque's own roots as an organization lie in the emergence of this independent film community in Vancouver.

The Cinematheque's operations, including its 153-seat cinema, administrative offices, library, and archive, are located at 1131 Howe Street in downtown Vancouver. In addition to hosting the organization's own screening activities, The Cinematheque's theatre is a host venue for several of Vancouver's largest annual film festivals, including the Vancouver International Film Festival, DOXA Documentary Film Festival, Vancouver Latin American Film Festival, and the Vancouver International Mountain Film Festival.

== History ==
The Cinematheque was one of several Vancouver cultural organizations to emerge from the vibrant avant-garde and alternative arts scene that developed on Canada's West Coast in the late 1960s and early 1970s. An important hub of this activity was Vancouver's Intermedia Society, a multidisciplinary collective, founded in 1967, of visual, performance, and media artists, including those interested in experimental, poetic, and "personal" cinema. In 1969, the Intermedia Film Co-op, a distributor and presenter of Vancouver-made independent film, emerged as an offshoot.

In 1971, Kirk Tougas, a young Vancouver filmmaker and film programmer and member of Intermedia, was asked by Werner Aellen, the director of Intermedia, and Tony Emery, the director of the Vancouver Art Gallery, to organize regular film screenings at the Art Gallery. With further institutional support from the National Film Board of Canada and its regional director Bruce Pilgrim, this led to the founding of the Pacific Cinémathèque as "a film museum, archive, and showcase." The organization was incorporated as a non-profit society in the Province of British Columbia in August 1972, with Tougas as its first director, a capacity in which he served until 1980.

Tony Reif, a Vancouver critic and curator of avant garde cinema, and now the owner of the Vancouver-based avant jazz record label Songlines, served as The Cinematheque's film programmer through much of the 1970s. Jeff Wall, the Vancouver artist now internationally renowned for his large-scale photo-based work, served as a film programmer in 1975–76. Tom Braidwood, the filmmaker and actor who later played Melvin Fohike, one of the three "Lone Gunmen" on the television series The X-Files and its spin-off series The Lone Gunmen, was The Cinematheque's manager in the early 1980s.

The Cinematheque was without a permanent home in its early years and used several local auditoriums for its public film screenings, including the old National Film Board of Canada theatre on West Georgia Street; the provincial government's Robson Square facility in downtown Vancouver; and the Vancouver Museum in Vanier Park on Vancouver's West Side.

In March 1986, The Cinematheque moved to its current home in the new, purpose-built Pacific Cine Centre at 1131 Howe Street, a facility developed to also house two other local film organizations, the Cineworks Independent Filmmakers Society (still a co-occupant) and Canadian Filmmakers Distribution West (since relocated, and now known as Moving Images Distribution). The Cine Centre was heralded as "Canada's first cultural centre dedicated to the cinematic arts to house under one roof production and distribution facilities for independent filmmakers and exhibition facilities for the community at large."

In a notorious incident of anti-institutional artistic vandalism, on March 28, 1986, during one of the Cine Centre's official opening-week events, the filmmaker Al Razutis, while participating in a panel on experimental film practice, defaced the front wall of Cinematheque's brand-new theatre by spray painting, below the movie screen, "Avant-garde spits in the face of institutional art." This "direct action" performance was documented in the 1986 short film On the Problems of the Autonomy of Art in Bourgeois Society or... Splice, co-directed by Doug Chomyn, Scott Haynes, and Razutis.

From 1991 to 2022, The Cinematheque was led by Jim Sinclair, who held the title of executive and artistic director. Sinclair joined the organization in 1987, was appointed its program (now artistic) director in 1988, and named its executive director in 1991. The Cinematheque is now led by Kate Ladyshewsky, executive director, and Shaun Inouye, artistic director.

The Cinematheque conducted its public activities under the name "Pacific Cinémathèque" until 2012, when it began operating publicly as, simply (and without accents), "The Cinematheque."
