= 28th Canadian Film Awards =

Canadian film awards ceremony

- Date: November 20, 1977
- Location: Hilton Harbour Castle Hotel, Toronto
- Hosted by: Gordon Pinsent

Highlights
- Most nominations: One Man
- Best Motion Picture: J.A. Martin Photographer (J.A. Martin, photographe)

The 28th Canadian Film Awards were held on November 20, 1977 to honour achievements in Canadian film. The ceremony was hosted by actor Gordon Pinsent.

For this year's awards, 143 films were submitted, including 11 features, 78 documentaries and 23 TV dramas. Also, the organizing committee announced a new selection process; films would now be assessed through secret ballot. This eliminated the selection practice using the nominating pre-selection committee and the international jury for the final selection. Now, a new jury group composed of one representative from each member organization chose four nominees in each category from a first ballot, then selected the winners from that group.

Despite the 1976 agreement that Quebec would organize the awards every other year, there were no Francophones on this year's organizing committee. CTV was meant to broadcast the ceremony but withdrew, so the CBC aired a one-hour special called All About the Canadian Film Awards.

== Films ==
Best Feature Film	Best Theatrical Short
J.A. Martin Photographer (J.A. Martin, photographe) — National Film Board of Canada, Jean-Marc Garand producer, Jean Beaudin director; One Man — National Film Board of Canada, James de Beaujeu Domville, Tom Daly, Michael J. F. Scott and Vladimir Valenta producers, Robin Spry director; Outrageous! — Film Consortium of Canada, CFDC, Bill Marshall, Peter O'Brian and Henk Van der Kolk producers, Richard Benner director; Why Shoot the Teacher? — Fraser Films, Lancer Productions: Lawrence Hertzog producer, Silvio Narizzano director	Spartree — Mercury Pictures, Jim Makichuk and Phillip Borsos producers, Phillip Borsos director; Outtakes — Hairy Ape Productions, Barry Healey producer and director; The Sand Castle (Le Chateau de sable) — National Film Board of Canada, Gaston Sarault producer, Co Hoedeman director; Silent Sky — Mindsoar Films, Laszlo George, David Mackay and Douglas Murray producers and directors
Best Documentary Under 30 Minutes	Best Documentary Over 30 Minutes
Greenpeace: Voyage to Save the Whales — Omnifilm Entertainment, Michael Chechik producer, Michael Chechik, Fred Easton and Ron Precious directors; Henry Ford's America — National Film Board of Canada, Donald Brittain, Paul Wright and Roman Kroitor producers, Donald Brittain director; Potters at Work — Marty Gross Film Productions, Marty Gross producer and director; Ritual: The Collective Psyche of Japan — Psychomedia Productions, Kalle Lasn producer and director	The Inquiry Film: A Report on the Mackenzie Valley Pipeline — Jesse Nishihata director and producer; Famille et variations — National Film Board of Canada, Anne Claire Poirier producer, Mireille Dansereau director; Games of the XXI Olympiad (Jeux de la XXIe olympiade) — National Film Board of Canada, Jacques Bobet producer, Jean Beaudin, Marcel Carrière, Georges Dufaux, Jean-Claude Labrecque directors; Homage to Chagall: The Colours of Love — Canadian Broadcasting Corporation, Harry Rasky director
Best Animated Film	Best TV Drama
Spinnolio — National Film Board of Canada, Wolf Koenig producer, John Weldon director; Bead Game — National Film Board of Canada, Ishu Patel; A Cosmic Christmas — Nelvana, Clive A. Smith, Michael Hirsh, Patrick Loubert producers, Clive A. Smith director; Symbiosis — David Cox, producer and director	Dreamspeaker — Canadian Broadcasting Corporation, Ralph L. Thomas producer, Claude Jutra director; Happiness Is Loving Your Teacher — National Film Board of Canada, Vladimir Valenta producer, John N. Smith director; Rose's House — National Film Board of Canada, Clay Borris director; Strangers at the Door — National Film Board of Canada, John Howe, Maxine Samuels and Roman Kroitor producers, John Howe director

== Feature Film Craft Awards ==
Best Performance by an Actor	Best Performance by an Actress
Len Cariou - One Man; David Petersen - Skip Tracer (Highlight Communications); Craig Russell - Outrageous!; Marcel Sabourin - J.A. Martin Photographer (J.A. Martin, photographe)	Monique Mercure - J.A. Martin Photographer (J.A. Martin, photographe); Jayne Eastwood - One Man; Carole Laure - The Angel and the Woman (L'Ange et la femme) (RSL Films); Hollis McLaren - Outrageous!
Best Supporting Actor	Best Supporting Actress
Jean Lapointe - One Man	Carole Lazare - One Man
Best Art Direction	Best Cinematography
Vianney Gauthier - J.A. Martin Photographer (J.A. Martin, photographe)	Pierre Mignot - J.A. Martin Photographer (J.A. Martin, photographe)
Best Direction	Best Music Score
Jean Beaudin - J.A. Martin Photographer (J.A. Martin, photographe); Allan King - Who Has Seen the Wind (Allan King Associates, Souris River Films); Silvio Narizzano - Why Shoot the Teacher?; Robin Spry - One Man	Paul Hoffert - Outrageous!
Best Film Editing	Best Sound Editing
Jean Beaudin and Hélène Girard - J.A. Martin Photographer (J.A. Martin, photographe); John Kramer - One Man	Les Halman and Ken Page - One Man
Best Original Screenplay	Best Adapted Screenplay
Robin Spry, Peter Pearson and Peter Madden - One Man; Zale Dalen - Skip Tracer; Marcel Sabourin and Jean Beaudin - J.A. Martin Photographer (J.A. Martin, photographe); Ratch Wallace - Age of Innocence (aka Ragtime Summer) (Judson Pictures, The Rank Organisation)	James DeFelice - Why Shoot the Teacher?; Richard Benner - Outrageous!; Patricia Watson - Who Has Seen the Wind; Stephen Zoller - Metal Messiah (MM Productions, JLS Films)
Best Overall Sound	
Claude Hazanavicius (recording) - One Man; Jean-Pierre Joutel (re-recording) - J.A. Martin Photographer (J.A. Martin, photographe)

== Non-Feature Craft Awards ==
Performance by a Lead Actor	Performance by a Lead Actress
George Clutesi - Dreamspeaker	Marina Dimakopoulos - Happiness Is Loving Your Teacher (NFB)
Supporting Actor or Actress	Art Direction
Jacques Hubert - Dreamspeaker	Evelyn Roth - Woven in Time (NFB)
Cinematography	Best Direction
Tamara Sale, Dave Geddes, Ron Orieux and Jeff Mart - Spartree	Claude Jutra - Dreamspeaker
Film Editing	Sound Editing
Mary Gross - Potters at Work (Marty Gross Film Productions)	Raymond Hall - Spartree
Screenplay	Non-Dramatic Script
Cam Hubert - Dreamspeaker	Donald Brittain - Henry Ford's America
Sound Recording	Sound Re-recording
Fred Easton, Chris Aikenhead and Michael Chechik - Greenpeace: Voyage to Save the Whales	Barry Jones - Spartree
Music Score	
Jean Cousineau - Dreamspeaker

== Special awards ==
- Ralph L. Thomas: "for increasing the stature of film drama on television in Canada".
- Wendy Michener Award: Zale Dalen - "for outstanding artistic achievement in Skip Tracer".
- Golden Reel Award: Lawrence Hertzog - Why Shoot the Teacher? - "for highest-grossing film".
- John Grierson Award: Fernand Dansereau - "for outstanding contributions to Canadian cinema".
