= New Film Makers =

- Genre: Short film
- Created by: Jack Vance
- Presented by: Lyal Brown
- Country of origin: Canada
- Original language: English
- No. of seasons: 1
- No. of episodes: 7

Production
- Executive producer: Rosalind Farber
- Producer: Doug Gillingham
- Running time: 30 minutes

Original release
- Network: CBC Television
- Release: 23 April – 23 June 1969

New Film Makers is a Canadian experimental short film television program that was broadcast on CBC Television in 1969.

== Premise ==
Lyal Brown hosted the program which featured independent short films and interviews with their producers. Chroma key technology was used to show excerpts from films as background for the interviews with filmmakers. Jack Vance developed the program's concept, with research by Betty-Jean Beyer.

== Scheduling ==
This half-hour program was broadcast on most Wednesdays at 10:30 p.m. (Eastern) from 23 April to 23 June 1969.

== Episodes ==
1. Conversation with Mort Ransen, producer of the National Film Board film Christopher's Movie Matinée, featuring youth in Toronto. The full production was shown on CBC Television several days later
2. Student films were the focus of this episode. From the McMaster Film Board, Jim Bennett's "Walk On" was featured. From Montreal, Gabriel Hoss and Serge Denko's "Caught in Rhythm" was shown.
3. "Lords of Creation" (Gerald Robinson) and "Flowers" (Takehiko Kamei).
4. Toronto film "Satan's Pipers" (Eric Young, Jon Slan).
5. More Toronto films: Rat Life and Diet in North America (Joyce Wieland) with Electrocution of the Word (Morley Markson).
6. French-language productions were featured.
7. Vancouver animated productions were featured such as Thank Heaven (Vancouver Art School) and Henry (Al Sens).

== See also ==
- Canadian Film Makers (1967)
- Canadian Film Makers (1974)
- Sprockets (1975–1976)
