= Canadian Film Makers =

Canadian Film Makers may refer to:

- Canadian Film Makers (1974 TV series)
- Canadian Film Makers (1967 TV series)
