= Cooperage (disambiguation) =

Cooperage is either the craft of barrel-making or the workshop in which the craft is practiced.

Cooperage may also refer to:

- Cooperage (film), a 1976 Canadian film
- Cooperage Ground, a football ground in Mumbai
