= Stingray (1985 TV series) =

American drama television series

- Genre: Drama
- Created by: Stephen J. Cannell
- Starring: Nick Mancuso
- Theme music composer: Walter Murphy
- Country of origin: United States
- Original language: English
- No. of seasons: 2
- No. of episodes: 24 (including one two-part pilot)

Production
- Executive producers: Stephen J. Cannell; Lawrence Hertzog
- Production locations: Los Angeles; Calgary; Vancouver
- Running time: 48 minutes
- Production company: Stephen J. Cannell Productions

Original release
- Network: NBC
- Release: July 14, 1985 – May 8, 1987

Stingray is an American drama television series created and produced by Stephen J. Cannell that aired on NBC from July 14, 1985, to May 8, 1987. The series stars Nick Mancuso as Ray, a mysterious former intelligence officer who helps people in trouble, asking only for a favor in return rather than payment. Ray advertises his services through cryptic newspaper ads offering a 1965 black Corvette Stingray "for barter only," and his true identity remains unknown throughout the series. The series began with a two-hour pilot film on July 14, 1985, and ran for two seasons totaling 23 regular episodes.

== Plot ==
Ray resides in Southern California. He devotes his time to helping those who are in trouble. His background is shadowy; all that is known about him is that he advertises surreptitiously in newspapers, ostensibly offering a " '65 black Stingray, for Barter Only To Right Party" and including a telephone number (555-7687). Those wishing to enlist his services, presumably having learned the ad's real meaning by word of mouth, can call him for help. It is not clear if "Ray" is even his real name, or simply a nickname he has taken on based on the car he drives, the same one described in the advertisement. In the pilot, he does say that it is short for "Raymond", but it never becomes clear if he is being honest or using a cover. In the episode "Sometimes You Gotta Sing the Blues" he identifies himself to police as Charles D. Stroke and invites identification by fingerprint. However, it is not made clear if this is his real name or part of an elaborate cover. In subsequent episodes, the name Charles D. Stroke is not used. In the stills during the end credits of the episode "Orange Blossom", a trailer is shown with the name Ray Simpson.

Ray does not charge money for his help. Instead, he requests a favor from his client in advance: the client will repay Ray in the future by performing one service—perhaps easy, perhaps difficult—upon Ray's request, and the request may not be refused. As the series begins, Ray has apparently collected favors from many previous clients. This allows him to call in a variety of favors during the series to help his current clients. For instance, when he poses as a doctor and is called upon to perform surgery, he calls in a favor from a physician client who secretly takes Ray's place in the operating room.

Ray is a skilled driver and accomplished martial artist, and is excellent at covering his tracks and hiding his real identity. On several occasions, clients and government authorities believe that they have discovered who he really is, but in the end they always find that they are mistaken. Often it seems that Ray either is or was affiliated with a secret government agency, perhaps the CIA, but this is never conclusively proven. In "Abnormal Psych" an unnamed opponent with ties to the U.S. Intelligence Community claims to have "created" Ray, and in "Anytime, Anywhere" it is clear that he served in Vietnam in some capacity. Whenever the license plate for his Stingray is run through a computer, it lists many different addresses and owners. Two of the most notable were "1600 Pennsylvania Ave., Washington, DC" (the address of the White House) and the motor pool for the Governor of California.

Ray's other talents include a photographic memory, speed reading, the ability to slow down his heart to barely perceptible levels, and a knack for adopting personas including an arrogant surgeon, a tent-revival preacher, a crippled Vietnam veteran, and a grieving husband. He is a skilled computer hacker, capable of accessing and altering data systems and coordinating information retrieval.

== Production ==
The 1986 eight-episode first season of Stingray was filmed in Southern California. Later that year, with a favorable exchange rate between the U.S. and Canadian dollars being a win/win for U.S. producers, series creator, Stephen J. Cannell, upon advice from series leading man Nick Mancuso, decided to shoot the second season of the series in Toronto. However, so many producers were shooting in Toronto that no crews were available to man any additional productions. Consequently, Cannell shot the first seven episodes of Stingray's second season in Calgary instead with the remaining eight episodes being shot in Vancouver.

== Music ==
Music, by veteran TV composers Mike Post, Pete Carpenter and Walter Murphy, long-time collaborators with Cannell, played a large part in the series. In addition to frequent quick-cutting of visuals in time with the incidental music, the show also inserted music video style interludes, complete with original, script-specific "pop songs" written by Stephen Geyer (co-writer "Theme for The Greatest American Hero", "Theme for Hardcastle & McCormick", "Theme for Blossom", etc.) and Post, and sung by (usually) semi-obscure pop and rock vocalists (for example, David Pack singing "Signs of Human Error" in the episode "Playback"). Notable vocalists include José Feliciano, Richie Havens, Taj Mahal, Timothy B. Schmit and Jennifer Warnes.

Uniquely, the end credits featured still photos of the production crew working on the episode.

In the episode "Sometimes You Gotta' Sing The Blues", a song of the same title was sung by Lois Blaisch, but the song was never released publicly.

== Guest stars ==
Notable guest stars included Rachel Ticotin, Ray Wise, Mark-Paul Gosselaar, Patricia Wettig, Tom Atkins, Kurtwood Smith, Robert Vaughn, Stuart Pankin, Steven Williams, Marcia Strassman, Eugene Roche, Gregg Henry, Lori Petty, Samantha Eggar, Jeff Altman, Shannon Tweed, Dennis Christopher, Doug Savant, Jeff Conaway, Gregory Sierra, Joseph Ruskin, Kareem Abdul-Jabbar, John Amos and Clyde Kusatsu.

== Awards and nominations ==
The series won the Primetime Emmy Award in 1986 in category "Outstanding Graphic and Title Design" (Betty Green, graphic design) and was nominated in 1987 in the category "Outstanding Sound Editing for a Series" for the episode "Gemini".

== Influence ==
The 1998 TV series Vengeance Unlimited also featured a mysterious individual, played by Michael Madsen, who does not charge money to help people extricate themselves from criminal victimization—his payment coming in the form of favors to be performed in helping future clients.

== Episodes ==
=== Pilot (1985) ===
Title	Directed by	Written by	Original release date
"Stingray"	Richard A. Colla	Stephen J. Cannell	July 14, 1985
An attractive district attorney asks Ray for help in dealing with a Mexican crime lord responsible for kidnapping and brainwashing several prominent people. Ray manages to infiltrate the drug lord's operation by posing as a rich Texan. Unfortunately, his cover is blown and he is subjected to the same mind altering process as the drug lord's other victims; Ray manages to resist the technique by focusing on similar tortures he underwent as a POW in Vietnam. In the end, Ray uses the drug lord's own gold-plated car to crush him before he can make his escape to international waters, and then Ray disappears as mysteriously as he came, leaving D.A. Delgado to wonder who he really was.

=== Season 1 (1986) ===
No.	Title	Directed by	Written by	Original release date
1	"Ancient Eyes"	Charlie Picerni	Herbert Wright	March 11, 1986
On the trail of a missing fieldworker Ray discovers a marijuana farm whose owners kill the workers when the harvest is over.
2	"Ether"	David Hemmings	Lawrence Hertzog	March 25, 1986
Ray goes undercover at a hospital as a surgeon to discover the cause of missing records for patients who are dying there under mysterious circumstances.
3	"Below the Line"	Larry Shaw	Tom Lazarus	April 1, 1986
When a woman's husband disappears and everyone at the oceanic research lab he worked at claims not to know him, she turns to Ray for help.
4	"Sometimes You Gotta Sing the Blues"	Kim Manners	Stephen J. Cannell	April 8, 1986
Ray is brought in by the police, only to find out that Captain Nelson Riskin wants to "hire" him, favor for favor. Riskin is being framed for his wife's murder. Helped by Riskin's assistant Candace, Ray goes undercover in a variety of guises. He eventually finds out that Riskin had incriminating information on former police chief Donald Dixon, who is now running for governor; Dixon and his squad of policemen framed Riskin. Ray escapes an execution squad, and reveals the evidence to Dixon's political backer. Dixon and his head goon try to escape, only to be stopped by Ray. At the end, Riskin is cleared but is unaware that Candace is romantically interested in him.
5	"Abnormal Psych"	Michael Preece	Lawrence Hertzog	April 15, 1986
Ray is put on the defensive when an old enemy attacks him via college students who have been programmed to kill.
6	"Orange Blossom"	Rob Bowman	Stephen J. Cannell	April 29, 1986
In order to substantiate claims that a Soviet helicopter is taking patients away from a mental hospital, Ray has himself committed there.
7	"Less Than the Eye Can See"	Gary Winter	Lawrence Hertzog	May 6, 1986
While relaxing at one of his favor-owers' homes, Ray finds himself drawn into a plan by an ailing doctor to let loose a highly virulent strain of smallpox when one victim literally pulls up in front of the house. Fighting against time and the possibility of his own contagious infection, Ray dodges corrupt government officials trying to cover up the incident as he tries to prevent the scientist from infecting the local water supply with the smallpox.
8	"That Terrible Swift Sword"	David Hemmings	Tom Lazarus	May 13, 1986
When a series of brutal murders of prostitutes seem to follow a revival crusade around, Ray goes undercover as a minister and gets blamed for the latest murder.

=== Season 2 (1987) ===
No.	Title	Directed by	Written by	Original release date
9	"The Greeter"	David Hemmings	Stephen J. Cannell	January 9, 1987
After the head chemist at a pharmaceutical company hires Ray to look into lethal drugs being made for sale in Africa, he vanishes without a trace. While going undercover, Ray calls on the help of a PTSD-afflicted Vietnam vet to find the evidence he needs and escape the company's clutches.
10	"Gemini"	Kim Manners	Harold Apter	January 16, 1987
Women are mysteriously being murdered by a serial killer. Each of them advertised for help using an ad for a black Stingray Corvette, and the murderer drives around in a Stingray. One of Ray's former clients, a councilwoman, helps to bring him in. Ray pulls in a favor or two to get out of jail, and begins to investigate. He eventually finds out that an old friend from his mysterious past, Edward Benton, is trying to get revenge on him. During a mission in East Germany, Benton was left behind and imprisoned and tortured as a spy. Now he is seeking to even the score. Ray tracks him down and rather than let himself be captured, Benton drives his car into a wall.
11	"Playback"	David Hemmings	Lawrence Hertzog, Carol Mendelsohn	January 23, 1987
Ray recreates a space isolation experiment to try and clear an old friend of murder charges which stem from the fact he was the sole survivor of the first experiment. The subjects of the second experiment become increasingly unstable and violent as it progresses, and Ray must unravel the mystery before history repeats itself.
12	"Bring Me the Hand That Hit Me"	Don Chaffey	Stephen J. Cannell, Frank Lupo	January 30, 1987
A rather dimwitted garage worker and his criminal buddy steal $700,000 from a Mafioso who launders his money through the garage which he owns. The garage worker's sister is concerned that her brother is going to blow it: he does not seem to realize that quitting the day after you rob your boss and going crazy spending the money on cool stuff is a bad thing. She contacts Ray, who pretends to be another dimwitted crook and tries to get the two criminals out of trouble. The brother's buddy tries to double-cross them, and eventually despite Ray's best efforts to work things out, the sister is killed by the Mafioso Godfather. Her brother is left to mourn, as Ray warns him that he will have to repay the favor his sister owed him.
13	"Echoes"	David Hemmings	Carol Mendelsohn	February 6, 1987
An artist, a former client of Ray's, is getting threatening calls from a stalker who Ray helped her out with, years before. In fact, the guy apparently died during his final encounter with Ray the last time around. The trail leads to a relative of the first stalker who is trying to get revenge.
14	"The First Time Is Forever"	Rob Bowman	Steven L. Sears	February 20, 1987
After a TV reporter whom Ray refused to help is killed, Ray decides to find out what the man was working on.
15	"Autumn"	Charlie Picerni	Marianne Canepa, Lawrence Hertzog	February 27, 1987
Ray ends up in real trouble when he gets involved in a fantasy case made up by an author who needed an idea for her book.
16	"The Neniwa"	Les Sheldon	Carol Mendelsohn	March 6, 1987
Ray attempts to resolve a dispute between a land developer and Indians who claim the proposed building site is on sacred ground.
17	"The Second Finest Man Who Ever Lived"	Larry Shaw	Burt Pearl	March 20, 1987
Ray helps a retarded man by going undercover as a dock worker at the dock where his father was killed in a suspicious accident.
18	"Night Maneuvers"	James Darren	Carol Mendelsohn	March 27, 1987
Ray goes undercover as an instructor at a military academy to help a student who witnessed his classmates commit murder.
19	"Cry Wolf"	Don Chaffey	Stephen J. Cannell	April 3, 1987
Ray gets drawn into a case of a drugged-up TV star, Ty Gardiner, who tries to hire him despite Ray's misgivings. Turns out Gardiner's name and celebrity were used by his unscrupulous partner to rip off both the Mafia and the Yakuza. Now that the partner has disappeared, Gardiner is left holding the bag with both sides trying to kill him, and the Feds looking for him as well.
20	"Blood Money"	Lyndon Chubbuck	Tom Blomquist	April 10, 1987
Ray helps the principal of an urban high school prevent a gang war from erupting.
21	"Anytime, Anywhere"	Chuck Bowman	Randall Wallace	April 17, 1987
Ray travels to Vietnam where an exploding bomb blinds him, hindering his search for a statue which can provide clues to the whereabouts of American MIAs.
22	"Caper"	Rob Bowman	Evan Lawrence	May 1, 1987
Ray must rescue the father of a Soviet defector who is being held captive by the Russians in the hold of an ocean liner.
23	"One Way Ticket to the End of the Line"	Larry Shaw	Judy Burns	May 8, 1987
Ray comes to the aid of a crop duster pilot who gets caught in the middle when two rival marijuana growers insist that he poisoned the other's fields.

== Home media ==
On April 1, 2008, Visual Entertainment released the complete series of Stingray on DVD in Canada.

On January 18, 2011, Mill Creek Entertainment released the complete series on DVD in Region 1 in a five-disc set.
