= Why Shoot the Teacher? =

Why Shoot the Teacher
- VHS box art
- Directed by: Silvio Narizzano
- Written by: James DeFelice
- Produced by: Lawrence Hertzog
- Starring: Bud Cort; Samantha Eggar; Kenneth Griffith; Chris Wiggins
- Cinematography: Marc Champion
- Edited by: Max Benedict; Stan Cole
- Music by: Ricky Hyslop
- Distributed by: Fraser Films & Lancer Productions Limited; Quartet Films (United States)
- Release dates: 1977 (Canada); 1980 (U.S.)
- Running time: 99 minutes
- Country: Canada
- Language: English
- Budget: C$810,000
- Box office: $1.8 million (Canada)

Why Shoot the Teacher is a 1977 Canadian comedy-drama film directed by Silvio Narizzano and starring Bud Cort, Samantha Eggar, Kenneth Griffith, and Chris Wiggins. It is based on a book of the same name by Max Braithwaite.

== Plot ==
The plot is set in 1935, during the Depression. Max Brown (Bud Cort) is an urban east-province Canadian fresh from college who travels to Western Canada to accept a teaching position at a one-room rural schoolhouse in the fictional settlement of Willowgreen, Saskatchewan, because there are no other jobs available.

He decides to live in the school's basement, having to adapt to teaching in the Depression-era rural setting, especially given the bleakness of the settlement. His students at first are rebellious, but it eventually changes to a connection between student and teacher as Max gets into a love for Alice Field (played by Samantha Eggar), going to him for emotional support.

Max barely gets paid and he suffers through the paltry winter of Willowgreen, especially suffering given his physical and emotional isolation in the town, only finding solace in Harris Montgomery (played by Gary Reineke) and Alice Field, who both try to use him to solve their problems of political socialism and her being a war bride of Britain.

Max eventually begins to understand Willowgreen and the rural struggles, as the inspector (Kenneth Griffith) comes in to look at his work, which does not end too well. The school year ends as Max is getting on a train back east, but before the credits roll, he tells us he returned the following September to teach another year at Willowgreen.

== Cast ==
- Bud Cort as Max Brown
- Samantha Eggar as Alice Field
- Chris Wiggins as Lyle Bishop
- Gary Reineke as Harris Montgomery
- John Friesen as Dave McDougall
- Michael J. Reynolds as Bert Field
- Kenneth Griffith as Inspector Woods
- Scott Swan as Dan Trowbridge

== Production notes ==
Why Shoot the Teacher was filmed on location at Hanna, Alberta. The film was produced with the assistance of the Canadian Film Development Corporation.

It was one of several Canadian films starring Samantha Eggar.

== Reception ==
James DeFelice won the Canadian Film Award for Best Adapted Screenplay at the 28th Canadian Film Awards. The film also won the Golden Reel Award for attaining higher box-office gross revenues of that year than any other Canadian film with a gross of $1.8 million.

It was later screened at the 1984 Festival of Festivals as part of Front & Centre, a special retrospective program of artistically and culturally significant films from throughout the history of Canadian cinema.
