= Happiness Is Loving Your Teacher =

- Directed by: John N. Smith
- Written by: Mariette Cook; John N. Smith
- Produced by: Vladimir Valenta
- Starring: Martin Kevan; Marina Dimakopoulos
- Cinematography: David De Volpi; Barry Perles
- Edited by: John N. Smith
- Production company: National Film Board of Canada
- Release date: 1977
- Running time: 28 minutes
- Country: Canada
- Language: English

Happiness Is Loving Your Teacher is a Canadian short drama film directed by John N. Smith and released in 1977. The film stars Martin Kevan as Mr. Todrick, a wheelchair-using substitute teacher facing an unruly high school class, and Marina Dimakopoulos as Tony, a student and class leader who comes to regret how she treated Mr. Todrick after she is given detention.

Dimakopoulos won the Canadian Film Award for Best Actress in a Non-Feature at the 28th Canadian Film Awards.
