= J.A. Martin Photographer =

1977 Canadian drama film

- French: J.A. Martin photographe
- Directed by: Jean Beaudin
- Written by: Jean Beaudin; Marcel Sabourin
- Produced by: Jean-Marc Garand
- Starring: Marcel Sabourin; Monique Mercure; Marthe Thiéry; Catherine Tremblay; Mariette Duval
- Cinematography: Pierre Mignot
- Edited by: Jean Beaudin; Hélène Girard
- Music by: Maurice Blackburn
- Production company: National Film Board of Canada
- Release date: 11 February 1977
- Running time: 100 minutes
- Country: Canada
- Language: French
- Budget: $488,014 (equivalent to $2,576,588 in 2025).

J.A. Martin Photographer (J.A. Martin photographe) is a 1977 drama film directed by Jean Beaudin for the National Film Board of Canada.

== Synopsis ==
The film follows a strong-willed woman, set to accompany her photographer husband on a trip through rural Québec in the late 19th century. Once a year, J.A. Martin, who specializes in family photography, packs his gear into an old wagon and goes out to visit his rural customers. Though a difficult trip, it’s a vacation from his marriage and family life. Unlike others years, his wife makes the decision to leave her children, going with her husband. In the course of the trip, they re-discover each other and regain the love they held before. The film is considered slow-paced and beautifully-photographed, in which Beaudin called it “a tribute to our grandmothers, our mothers and all the women of Québec.”

== Reception ==
=== Box office ===
In France, the film was viewed by over 100,000 people.

=== Critical response ===
When J.A. Martin Photographer was first released in Québec, critics for publications such as Le Devoir and La Presse gave it negative reviews. After it won praise at the Cannes Film Festival, and Monique Mercure became the first Canadian to win the award for Best Actress, critical opinion in Québec became more positive. In 1984, the Toronto International Film Festival ranked J.A. Martin Photographer seventh in the Top 10 Canadian Films of All Time.

In 2011, the Québec magazine L'actualité ranked it No. 1 on its list of 35 Québec films most worth seeing.

In a 2016 poll conducted of 200 media professionals conducted by the Toronto International Film Festival, Library and Archives Canada, the Cinémathèque québécoise and The Cinematheque Vancouver, it was named one of 150 essential works in Canadian cinema history.

=== Awards ===
- Cannes Film Festival: Best Actress, Monique Mercure, 1977
- Cannes Film Festival: Nominee: Prize of the Ecumenical Jury, 1977
- 28th Canadian Film Awards, Toronto 1977:

Best Feature Film
Best Performance by an Actor, Monique Mercure
Best Cinematography, Pierre Mignot
Best Direction, Jean Beaudin
Best Film Editing, Jean Beaudin and Hélène Girard
Best Art Direction, Vianney Gauthier

J.A. Martin Photographer was selected as the Canadian entry for the Best Foreign Language Film at the 50th Academy Awards, but was not accepted as a nominee.

== Legacy ==
American director Robert Altman, whose film 3 Women also screened at Cannes that year (its star Shelley Duvall tied with Mercure for the Best Actress prize) was so impressed that he hired cinematographer Pierre Mignot on nine of his subsequent films, including Come Back to the 5 & Dime, Jimmy Dean, Jimmy Dean, Streamers, Fool for Love and Prêt-à-Porter.

In 2007, The NFB released J.A. Martin Photographer on DVD. In 2008, it was screened at Musée national des beaux-arts du Québec as part of the exhibition Québec City and its Photographers, 1850-1908: The Yves Beauregard Collection.

== See also ==
- List of submissions to the 50th Academy Awards for Best Foreign Language Film
- List of Canadian submissions for the Academy Award for Best Foreign Language Film

== Works cited ==
- Evans, Gary (1991). In the National Interest: A Chronicle of the National Film Board of Canada from 1949 to 1989. University of Toronto Press. ISBN 0802027849.
- Marshall, Bill (2001). Quebec National Cinema. McGill–Queen's University Press. ISBN 0-7735-2103-8.
