= Beyond the Walls (2012 film) =

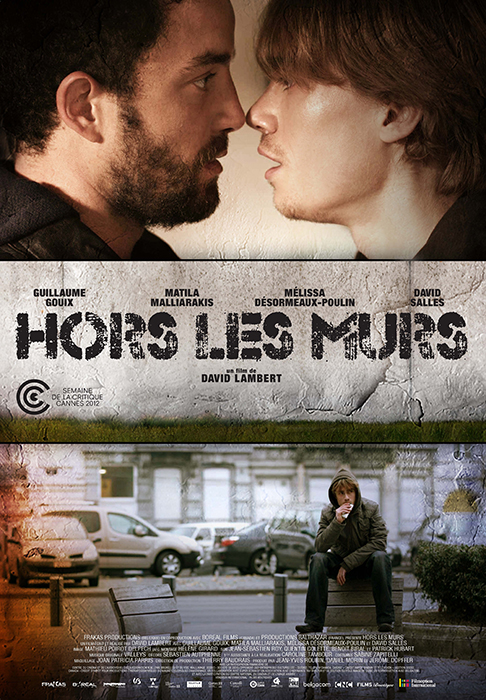
- Film poster
- French: Hors les murs
- Directed by: David Lambert
- Written by: David Lambert
- Produced by: Jérôme Dopffer; Daniel Morin; Jean-Yves Roubin
- Starring: Guillaume Gouix; Matila Malliarakis
- Cinematography: Matthieu Poirot-Delpech
- Edited by: Hélène Girard
- Music by: Flonja Kodheli
- Release date: 20 May 2012 (CFF)
- Running time: 98 minutes
- Countries: Belgium; Canada; France
- Language: French

Beyond the Walls (French: Hors les murs) is a 2012 French / Belgian / Canadian drama film directed by David Lambert.

The film centres on a romance between Paulo (Matila Malliarakis) and Ilir (Guillaume Gouix), complicated by the bisexual Paulo's relationship with his girlfriend Anka (Mélissa Désormeaux-Poulin).

The film premiered at the 2012 Cannes Film Festival, where it was in contention for the Queer Palm.

== Cast ==
- Guillaume Gouix as Ilir
- Matila Malliarakis as Paulo
- David Salles as Grégoire
- Mélissa Désormeaux-Poulin as Anka
- Flonja Kodheli as Ilir's sister
- Carmela Locantore as Ilir's mother

== Awards ==
At the 15th Jutra Awards in 2013, Hélène Girard was a nominee for Best Editing.
