= Martin Kevan =

Canadian actor, voice actor, and author

- Born: March 19, 1947; Nairobi, Kenya
- Died: May 1, 2013 (aged 66); Montreal, Quebec, Canada
- Education: McGill University
- Occupations: Actor, Voice actor, Author

Martin Kevan (March 19, 1947 – May 1, 2013) was a Canadian actor, voice actor, and author.

== Early life ==
Kevan was born in Nairobi, Kenya on March 19, 1947. He moved to Canada with his whole family in May, 1958. He attended McGill University, where he studied business and was active with the thespian community there. He decided to become an actor and acted on stage, film, radio and TV.

== Death ==
He died after a brief battle with cancer in Montreal on 1 May 2013.

== Acting career ==
His roles include the drama Happiness Is Loving Your Teacher (1977), for which he was nominated as 'best actor' in the Canadian Film Awards.

Kevan also worked on the film "Arena" (1979), an 8-minute film by Lois Siegel.

Kevan also provided voice acting and motion capture for the video game Far Cry 3 as Dr. Alec Earnhart.
