= Brian Doyle (Canadian writer) =

Canadian writer (1935–2026)

- Born: 12 August 1935; Ottawa, Ontario, Canada
- Died: 1 January 2026 (aged 90); Wakefield, Quebec, Canada
- Education: Carleton University
- Occupation: Author
- Spouse: Jackie Aronson
- Children: 2
- Writing career
- Genre: Children's literature

Brian Doyle (12 August 1935 – 1 January 2026) was a Canadian writer of novels and short stories. His children's books have been adapted into movies and plays. Many of his stories are drawn from his experiences growing up in the Ottawa area. He was awarded the NSK Neustadt Prize for Children's Literature in 2005 and was twice a finalist for the Hans Christian Andersen Award.

His writings evoke a strong sense of location, reflecting urban Ottawa and the Gatineau Valley. Angel Square and Easy Avenue are set in Ottawa in the 1940s and 50's; Spud Sweetgrass represents Ottawa in the early 1990s. Uncle Ronald and Covered Bridge draw on Brian Doyle's childhood memories of Ottawa and the Gatineau Valley.

== Early life ==
Doyle was born on 12 August 1935 in an ethnically-diverse section of Ottawa, Ontario, where he also grew up. He spent summers with his family at a log cabin on the Gatineau River, near Low, Quebec. His upbringing was made difficult by a father who drank excessively and a mother worn out from caring for his mentally disabled older sister. He attended Glebe Collegiate Institute, where he participated in sports and wrote poetry for the school yearbook, but also fought, stole, and skipped school. He began writing short stories, some of which he submitted to magazines. Doyle then attended Carleton University in Ottawa, where he majored in journalism, and met his future wife Jackie Aronson. Before graduation, Doyle won a prize for an essay he wrote about the Gatineau River Valley.

== Career ==
After graduation, Doyle worked as a reporter for the Toronto Telegram. He soon left this job to teach high school in Ottawa. He took courses at University of Ottawa towards a master's degree in literature, but did not write a thesis.

While working as a teacher, Doyle wrote a column for a local newspaper and published a short story in the literary magazine Fiddlehead. After he and his wife began to participate in local theater, Doyle began writing plays for his students. He also wrote an article criticizing teacher training which was quoted in The Globe and Mail. Doyle was hired as head of Glebe Collegiate's English department. During his time at Glebe he wrote and produced a number of original musical productions with his colleague Stan Clark, Head of Glebe's Music Department. They were: Oh My Gods; Labour Pains; To Hull and Back; It's Nicer Inverness'; Chipwagon; Up the Gatineau and One More Time. Doyle retired from teaching in 1991.

== Writing ==
Doyle's first book for young readers, Hey, Dad!, written for his daughter Megan, was published by Groundwood Books in 1978.

His first young-adult novel, Up to Low, was set in Quebec's Gatineau Hills, and based on his childhood experiences at his family's cabin. Angel Square is set in the Lower Town area of Ottawa, and portrays the futility of the racial tensions between the neighbourhood's children. One of the characters in the story is based on Doyle's mentally handicapped sister Pamela.

Doyle's continued to write novels for teens and young adults: Uncle Ronald (1996), a story about hundred-year-old "Crazy Mickey"; Easy Avenue, about an impoverished orphan growing up with an elderly relative; and Covered Bridge, a ghost story about moral injustice and historical preservation.

He also wrote two comic mysteries about a half-Irish, half-Ojibway teen, Spud Sweetgrass and Spud in Winter.

== Personal life and death ==
Doyle married Jackie Aronson; they had two children, Megan and Ryan. In 2013 he lived in Chelsea, Quebec.

Doyle died at La Maison des Collines, a hospice in Wakefield, Quebec, on 1 January 2026, at the age of 90.

== Awards and honors ==
- NSK Neustadt Prize for Children's Literature, 2005, for body of work
- Book of the Year Award, Canadian Library Association (CLA), 1983, Up to Low, and 1989, Easy Avenue
- Mr. Christie's Book Award, Canadian Children's Book Centre/Communications Jeunesse, 1990, Covered Bridge
- Vicky Metcalf Award, Canadian Authors Association, 1991, body of work
- CLA Book of the Year Award, 1997, Uncle Ronald
- Mr. Christie's Book Award, 1997, Uncle Ronald
- Hans Christian Andersen Award, finalist 1998, body of work
- National Chapter Award, 2001, Mary Ann Alice
- Leishman Prize, 2001, Mary Ann Alice
- Mr. Christie's Book Award, silver seal 2001, Mary Ann Alice
- Hans Christian Andersen Award, finalist 2008, body of work

== Adaptations ==
You Can Pick Me up at Peggy's Cove was one of Atlantis Films' earliest films (Alliance Atlantis Communications Inc), directed by Don McBrearty and starring Hadley Kay as the young protagonist. The video was released by Beacon Films, Inc., in 1982. Peggy's Cove, Angel Square and Easy Avenue have been released as audio books. Meet the Author: Brian Doyle was released as a short film in 1987. Angel Square was made into a film directed by Ann Wheeler and released by the National Film Board of Canada in 1990. Pure Spring, Boy O'Boy and Easy Avenue were adapted for the stage by students at Glebe Collegiate, and Up to Low was performed as a play Featherston Public School.

In 2015, Janet Irwin's adaptation of Up to Low was staged at the Ottawa Children's Theatre.

== Works ==
- Hey, Dad! (Groundwood, 1978)
- You Can Pick Me Up at Peggy's Cove (Groundwood, 1979)
- Up to Low (Groundwood, 1982)
- Angel Square (Groundwood, 1984)
- Easy Avenue (Groundwood, 1988)
- Covered Bridge (Groundwood, 1990)
- Spud Sweetgrass (Groundwood, 1992)
- Spud in Winter (Groundwood, 1995)
- Uncle Ronald (Vancouver: Douglas & McIntyre, 1996) – "A Groundwood book." OCLC 166262634
- The Low Life: Five Great Tales from Up and Down the River (Groundwood, 1999)
- Mary Ann Alice (Groundwood, 2001)
- Boy O'Boy (Douglas & McIntyre, 2003)
- Pure Spring (Groundwood Books, 2007), OCLC 74028920
- Picking Berries (2019)
