= David Petersen (actor) =

Canadian actor (1947–2018)

- Born: May 15, 1947; Cardston, Canada
- Died: November 2, 2018 (aged 71)
- Education: University of British Columbia
- Occupation: Actor

David Petersen (May 15, 1947 – November 2, 2018) was a Canadian actor. He was most noted for his performance in the 1977 film Skip Tracer, for which he received a Canadian Film Award nomination for Best Actor at the 28th Canadian Film Awards.

Born in Cardston, Alberta, and raised in Whitehorse, Yukon and Richmond, British Columbia, Petersen studied theatre at the University of British Columbia in the 1960s. He was one of the founding members of Vancouver's Tamahnous Theatre collective.

In addition to Skip Tracer, he also appeared in the films The Grey Fox (1982), Big Meat Eater (1982) and Samuel Lount (1986), and made recurring or guest appearances in the television series The Beachcombers, Danger Bay, Airwolf, Wiseguy, Bordertown, The X-Files, Da Vinci's Inquest and Cold Squad.
