= Outtakes (film) =

1977 film

- Directed by: Barry Healey
- Written by: Barry Healey
- Produced by: Barry Healey
- Starring: Richard Romanus; Bill Reiter
- Cinematography: John Holbrook
- Edited by: Jana Fritsch
- Production company: Hairy Ape Productions
- Release date: 1977
- Running time: 19 minutes
- Country: Canada
- Language: English

Outtakes is a Canadian comedy short film, directed by Barry Healey and released in 1977. The film stars Bill Reiter as a film director working on his latest film, only for his lead actor Marty (Richard Romanus) to repeatedly mess up takes.

The film received a Canadian Film Award nomination for Best Theatrical Short Film at the 28th Canadian Film Awards.
