= Water Sark =

- Directed by: Joyce Wieland
- Starring: Joyce Wieland
- Cinematography: Joyce Wieland
- Production company: Corrective Films
- Release date: 1965
- Running time: 13 minutes

Water Sark is a 1965 experimental short film by Canadian artist Joyce Wieland.

== Description ==
Water Sark begins with opening credits made out of paper letters placed on a lamp. Wieland's reflection is briefly seen, showing her holding an 8 mm camera. The film captures several items on a table: a teapot, a bowl, a glass of water, plastic flowers, and a fern. These objects are explored visually as Wieland uses water, mirrors, and camera movements to manipulate the image.

After this initial passage, Wieland's body appears among the other visual elements. Additional objects are introduced. A prism and lens are introduced are used to reshape the image, and Wieland begins to play with rubber gloves, a toy boat, a magnifying glass, and transparent plastic. The film closes with a shot of water being grazed by Wieland's fingers.

== Production ==
Wieland was an multidisciplinary artist who had worked in painting, quilting, and soft sculpture. She made Water Sark while living in New York. Wieland began work in 1963, while completing the films Patriotism and Patriotism Part II. She characterized it as a "desperate self-portrait", which she viewed as an extension of her drawing practice. She experimented with LSD during production of the film and described the results as having "to do very much with acid and light".

The film's experimental jazz soundtrack was recorded by pianist Carla Bley, songwriter Ray Jessel, and trumpeter Michael Mantler. Wieland selected the title Water Sark because she viewed water as a central element of the film symbolizing creativity and the unconscious. The word sark was a filler word she associated with boats, but which had no actual meaning.

== Release and reception ==
The National Film Board considered distributing the film, but the representative who viewed it became enraged by the image of Wieland's breasts and berated Wieland before chasing her out of the building.

The film received little attention upon its initial release. Peter Goddard wrote that the film's "greatness is that of inspired, intuitive filmmaking, not just great feminist filmmaking."

Paul Arthur suggests that Hollis Frampton's use of a rubber glove in Poetic Justice (1972) is a reference to Water Sark.

== Bibliography ==
- Arthur, Paul (2007). "Different/Same/Both/Neither: The Polycentric Cinema of Joyce Wieland". In Blaetz, Robin (ed.). Women's Experimental Cinema: Critical Frameworks. Duke University Press. ISBN 978-0-8223-4023-2.
- Bliss, Lauren (2020). The Maternal Imagination of Film and Film Theory. Palgrave Macmillan. ISBN 978-3-030-45896-6.
- Elder, Kathryn, ed. (1999). The Films of Joyce Wieland. Toronto International Film Festival Group. ISBN 978-0-9682969-2-9.
- Lind, Jane (2001). Joyce Wieland: Artist on Fire. James Lorimer & Company. ISBN 978-1-55028-695-3.
- Nowell, Iris (2001). Joyce Wieland: A Life in Art. ECW Press. ISBN 978-1-55022-476-4.
