= Nowhere Man (American TV series) =

American television series

- Promotional poster
- Genre: Science fiction; Mystery; Conspiracy; Psychological thriller
- Created by: Lawrence Hertzog
- Starring: Bruce Greenwood
- Theme music composer: Mark Snow
- Composer: Mark Snow
- Country of origin: United States
- Original language: English
- No. of seasons: 1
- No. of episodes: 25

Production
- Executive producers: Lawrence Hertzog; Joel Surnow
- Editors: Andrew Cohen; Peter Basinski; Jimmy Giritlian; Josh Muscatine
- Running time: 66 minutes (pilot); 43–45 minutes
- Production companies: Lawrence Hertzog Productions; Touchstone Television

Original release
- Network: UPN
- Release: August 28, 1995 – May 20, 1996

Nowhere Man is an American mystery science fiction thriller television series that aired on UPN on Monday nights from August 28, 1995, to May 20, 1996, starring Bruce Greenwood. The series was created by Lawrence Hertzog. Despite critical acclaim, including TV Guide's label of "This season's coolest hit," the show was cancelled after one season. Reruns later aired in the early 2000s on Family Channel in Canada.

== Overview ==
Nowhere Man is the story of photojournalist Thomas Veil, who discovers that his life has been abruptly "erased": his friends claim not to know him, his wife claims not to recognize him and is living with another man. His ATM cards and credit cards no longer work. His best friend turns up dead. His private studio is now owned by someone else. His mother, recovering from a stroke, is incapable of confirming his existence. He is ejected from his favorite restaurant as a total lunatic. In the course of a single evening, every trace of Tom's identity is gone.

Tom believes this is a conspiracy related to a photograph he took a year earlier, depicting four men being hanged in South America by what appear to be US soldiers. The only evidence Tom has of his past are the negatives of that photograph. A mysterious organization covertly pursues Tom in search of the negatives. The series revolves around Veil's attempts to get his life back by trying to find out more about the organization, while also trying to keep the negative safe.

In the final episode, "Gemini", it is revealed that Tom had been captured by the organization prior to the events of the series' first episode, and that all his memories of his life, including his marriage and even his name, had been implanted as part of a brainwashing experiment known as Project Marathon. He learns that he is actually a covert government operative codenamed "Gemini", and is part of a secret task force called "Heritage House", which was formed to investigate the organization and Project Marathon. He also learns that his copy of the "Hidden Agenda" photograph, as well as his memories of having taken it, have been altered, and that the original negative shows that the four men being lynched are actually U.S. senators being murdered by the organization.

Tom finds out the negative "Hidden Agenda" photograph is not real and the whole thing was a set-up. He questions the "number two man at the FBI" at gunpoint, but the man kills himself rather than risk revealing information under torture. The series ends with Tom watching a videotape that had been in the FBI man's possession, a film that finally explains everything: it shows "Tom" sitting in a chair under the influence being brainwashed into believing he is "Thomas Veil" and the life he has been living.

== Production ==
Although the main character travels from city to city across the United States in search of clues about the conspiracy, exteriors on the show were filmed in Portland, Oregon. Many local landmarks can be seen in the background of various shots. Series creator Larry Hertzog has acknowledged the influence of The Prisoner and The Fugitive in the show's themes. Resemblances can also be seen to The Manchurian Candidate, North by Northwest, 12 Monkeys, Three Days of the Condor, The X-Files and the 1967 television series Coronet Blue.

== Recurring cast ==
- Megan Gallagher as Alyson Veil (4 episodes)
- Murray Rubinstein as Larry (2 episodes)
- Mary Gregory as Mrs. Veil (2 episodes)
- Jay Arlen Jones as Joe 'J. C.' Carter/Dr. Novik (2 episodes)

== Episodes ==
No.	Title	Directed by	Written by	Original release date
1	"Absolute Zero"	Tobe Hooper	Lawrence Hertzog	August 28, 1995
Thomas J. Veil is a photojournalist living in Evanston, Illinois. During a quiet dinner with his wife Alyson (Megan Gallagher), Veil goes to the bathroom for a smoke. When he returns, his wife is gone and the maitre d' no longer recognizes him. Veil tries to find a safe place to stay, only to find his home occupied by another man, his bank account inaccessible and his best friend dead. He begins to unravel as he discovers that his wife is a part of whatever is happening to him. After being confined to Calaway Psychiatric Hospital, he is placed in the care of a Dr. Walter Bellamy (Michael Tucker), who may or may not be trying to help him get better. As he commiserates with fellow patient Eddie Powers (Ted Levine), who mysteriously seems to understand what Veil is going through, Veil begins to realize that his former life has been erased by a shadowy conspiracy and that his troubles are tied to a photograph he took entitled "Hidden Agenda".
2	"Turnabout"	Tobe Hooper	Lawrence Hertzog	September 4, 1995
After fleeing to Oregon using credit cards stolen from Dr. Bellamy, Veil is picked up by operatives of the conspiracy, who believe that he is Dr. Bellamy. He is transported to a Midwest sanitarium that is secretly operated by the conspiracy and asked to "treat" Ellen Combs (Mimi Craven), a young woman whose identity has also recently been erased by the conspiracy. The supervisor (George DelHoyo) promises "Bellamy" the Veil case file if he can get Ms. Combs to cooperate and Veil agrees to the task. Veil finds that Ellen's story is strikingly similar to his own as he tries to protect Ellen while also trying to discover the secret of his erasure.
3	"The Incredible Derek"	James Darren	Joel Surnow	September 11, 1995
Veil travels to Tipton, Georgia, in search of the humvee from his photograph. At a nearby traveling tent attraction, he meets a blind 10-year-old boy named Derek Williams (Zachery McLemore) who can see into Veil's past and future. With the young boy's help, Veil evades capture by soldiers from the local army base who strangely seem to be looking for him. But when the boy abruptly vanishes, Veil must evade the operatives of the conspiracy and find his young friend.
4	"Something About Her"	James Whitmore, Jr.	Lawrence Hertzog	September 18, 1995
Veil is working as a taxi driver in Missouri when the conspiracy kidnaps him. Through the use of psychotropic drugs and suggestion, the conspiracy programs Veil to believe that he is in love with an attractive photographer named Karin (Carrie-Anne Moss). However, in reality, Karin is an actress hired by the conspiracy to trick Veil into giving up his negatives. Veil experiences flashbacks to his former life that conflict with his new reality and the conspiracy is forced to accelerate its efforts to extract the negatives from Veil, putting his life at risk.
5	"Paradise on Your Doorstep"	Thomas J. Wright	Lawrence Hertzog	September 25, 1995
While working at a photo shop in Missouri, Veil unexpectedly comes across a picture of his wife Alyson dining with another woman at a local restaurant. When the woman Dee (Saxon Trainor) picks up the photographs, Veil secretly follows her from the store, only to be captured and transported to a mysterious "village" called New Phoenix that is populated by the "disenfranchised", people like Veil who have had their identities erased by the conspiracy. The disenfranchised claim they have banded together to battle the conspiracy, but when Paul (Stephen Meadows), the leader of the disenfranchised, asks for Veil's negatives to assist in the fight, Veil must make a choice. But a dark secret may lie at the heart of New Phoenix.
6	"The Spider Webb"	Thomas J. Wright	Joel Surnow	October 9, 1995
Veil visits the last known residence of Eddie Powers in Washington state to find out just what Powers knew. While Veil searches Powers' room, the television set abruptly begins showing "The Lenny Little Show", a program that seems to be depicting re-enacted scenes from Veil's former life and erasure. Veil traces the program's origin to the nearby Max Webb Studios and confronts the sneering writer-producer Webb (Richard Kind). Webb taunts Veil with broad hints about his knowledge of Veil's past life and suggests that he knows exactly what Veil will do next. Webb dares Veil to try to find the answers he seeks, which are hidden in a nearby secure facility, hoping that Veil takes the bait.
7	"A Rough Whimper of Insanity"	Guy Magar	Joel Surnow	October 23, 1995
While working as a pizza deliveryman in Colorado, Veil encounters Scott Jordan (Sean Whalen), a reclusive computer hacker who has made the conscious decision to isolate himself from the rest of the world and live in solitude and darkness with only his computers and a virtual reality simulator. Veil finds Scott collapsed on the floor of his home and revives him. Although Scott is sickly and socially awkward, he responds to this act of kindness and offers his help finding the secret of Veil's erasure. But when an attempt to find the truth nearly results in catastrophe, Veil must weigh the consequences of another attempt versus the welfare of his friend.
8	"The Alpha Spike"	Steven Robman	Erica Byrne	October 30, 1995
Veil travels to a regimented private prep school in Connecticut to investigate the origins of Dr. Bellamy's methods of subliminal persuasion. While working as a groundskeeper under an assumed name, Veil becomes a key witness in a murder investigation at the school being conducted by the skeptical Sheriff Wade (Bryan Cranston). When Veil risks exposure by identifying the cadet Kyle Mencks (Jackson Price) as the killer, Kyle suddenly turns the tables on Veil, whose secretive behavior marks him as a man with something to hide. As suspicion suddenly falls on him, Veil must convince the lawman that he is telling the truth before the conspiracy finds him.
9	"You Really Got a Hold on Me"	Michael Levine	Jake Weinberger & Michael Weinberger	November 6, 1995
At an amusement park in Milwaukee, Wisconsin, Veil is rescued from an operative of the conspiracy by Gus Shepard (Dean Stockwell), a man whose life had been erased by the same conspiracy more than 25 years before. Shepard has futilely battled the conspiracy for decades only to discover that its focus has shifted from him to Veil and that his life as a fugitive has lost its meaning. Shepard plans to end his own life, but not before showing Veil the life he has led and everything that his battle against the conspiracy has cost him as he tries to convince Veil to give up his life on the run.
10	"Father" "Validation"	Guy Magar	Art Monterastelli	November 13, 1995
Veil returns to the small Missouri town where he grew up and encounters the father who deserted him and his mother 20 years prior. Jonathan Crane (Dean Jones), the man who claims that he is Veil's father, welcomes him with open arms and invites him to stay at his home with his new wife and son. But Crane's recent plastic surgery, furtive actions and odd behavior give Veil reasons to believe that Crane is not actually his father. When Veil observes strange men shadowing them around town, he suspects the conspiracy is nearby and waiting to strike. Veil demands that Crane provide proof of their past relationship, which Crane strangely seems unable to supply.
11	"An Enemy Within"	Ian Toynton	Peter Dunne	November 20, 1995
Veil finds himself in rural Sweetridge, Pennsylvania awaiting an important phone call from a detective investigating a lead from Veil's photo. While unwittingly trespassing on private property, Veil is shot by a guard and left for dead. Emily Noonan (Maria Bello), a young woman who recently returned to Sweetridge after a long absence, finds him unconscious and bleeding and nurses him back to health. The two develop a bond as both Emily and Veil find that they are both harboring secrets from their past. A conglomerate seeks to buy up all the land in town and Veil comes to admire and respect Emily's courage and resourcefulness in the struggle against the company. As the two grow closer, Veil finds that he must choose between his search for the truth and abandoning his fight against the conspiracy for a life with Emily.
12	"It's Not Such a Wonderful Life" "The Christmas Episode"	Tim Hunter	Lawrence Hertzog	November 27, 1995
It is Christmas time in Richmond, Virginia, but Thomas Veil is only aware of another day in his battle against the conspiracy. Veil reads in a newspaper that the government has been searching for him in connection with his photograph "Hidden Agenda". Suddenly, Veil is located by agents under the direction of federal prosecutor Sandra Wilson (Carol Huston) and appointed the star witness against what Wilson calls "The Organization", a powerful, secretive group that seeks to control the true levers of power. Veil is immediately placed under federal protection and reunited with his wife Alyson as he prepares to offer testimony. His ordeal can finally end after he testifies and turns over his negatives to the authorities. But Veil does not know if he can bring himself to believe that his fight is truly over.
13	"Contact" "Deep Throat"	Reza Badiyi	Lawrence Hertzog	January 15, 1996
Veil is working as a delivery messenger in Salem, California when he is contacted by a mysterious voice from inside the conspiracy. The man tells Veil that he will help him find Richard Grace (Joe Lambie), a high-ranking member of the conspiracy and the man who ordered Veil's erasure. In exchange, the man asks only that Veil murder Grace. The man provides a detailed plan that will enable Veil to kill Grace without detection, but Veil is hesitant to become an instrument of assassination. Veil goes to Grace's home to confront his tormentor and discover the truth, but the encounter goes horribly wrong and Veil must elude both the police and the conspiracy if he hopes to remain free.
14	"Heart of Darkness"	Stephen Thomas Stafford	David Ehrman	January 22, 1996
Using information provided by his contact from within the conspiracy, Veil returns to the Pacific Northwest to investigate Commander Cyrus Quinn (James Tolkan), a secretive military man who runs a camp deep in the wilderness where new recruits for the paramilitary "American Guard" live and train. Veil assumes the identity of recent recruit and infiltrates the camp. There, he is placed under the command of the brutal C. W. Knox (Patrick Kilpatrick), who subjects those who fail to conform to the rules to his extreme disciplinary measures. Veil must determine the camp's connection to the conspiracy before his true identity is discovered.
15	"Forever Jung" "Doubles"	Greg Beeman	Joel Surnow	February 5, 1996
Veil finds an address in the tablet computer provided by his contact and journeys to a nursing home in Eveleth, Minnesota. The unexpected deaths of several apparently healthy residents prompt Veil to investigate a local biogenetics company, where he encounters a young woman named Pauline (Melanie Smith), who seems strangely familiar. Under the direction of Dr. John Shayzin (Leon Russom), Pauline has been undergoing radical experimental treatments that are designed to rejuvenate human tissues. As he delves deeper into the company files and history, Veil discovers that Shayzin may have motives other than altruism for his treatments. This episode has created considerable controversy among fans as to whether Alyson is a real person, or a wholly false identity created only to entrap Veil.
16	"Shine a Light on You"	Stephen Thomas Stafford	Art Monterastelli	February 12, 1996
A name found in the tablet computer brings Veil to tiny Rockwater, Colorado in search of a physicist named John Meyerson, whom he believes is another victim of the conspiracy. He learns that Meyerson has been missing for more than a year and that locals, including the town's resident UFO buff, Bud Atkins (Roy Brocksmith), fervently believe that his disappearance was the result of an alien abduction, a belief supported by the presence of strange electrical phenomena and unexplained lights at night. Veil introduces himself to the missing man's daughter Helen (Dorie Barton) and together the two try to unravel the mystery of Meyerson's disappearance.
17	"Stay Tuned"	Mel Damski	Lawrence Hertzog	February 19, 1996
Another entry from the tablet computer leads Veil to Darby, New York during the election season. Darby seems to be an idyllic small American town where everybody is friendly and civic-minded. However, everyone in town except young Michael (Billy O'Sullivan) and his new teacher Janet Cowan (Karen Witter) seems overly focused on community television programs and the gubernatorial campaign of successful local politician Jim Hubbard (Cliff DeYoung). Veil suspects some form of mind control and he and Janet decide to visit the Hubbard campaign headquarters to find out the truth. The two are quickly discovered and indoctrinated and are soon among the campaign's many volunteer workers. When Michael confronts him, Veil begins to realize that something is wrong, but struggles to break free from the programming that everyone else in town has been unable to resist.
18	"Hidden Agenda"	Michael Levine	David Ehrman	February 26, 1996
Veil arrives in Washington DC and receives a call from his mysterious contact inside the conspiracy. The man, known as Alexander Hale (Robin Sachs), arranges to meet with Veil in person to reveal the truth behind the photograph "Hidden Agenda". Unbeknownst to Veil, the conspiracy has already discovered Hale's treachery and coerced him into the meeting to trick Veil into revealing what he knows. In flashback, Veil explains how he came to take the picture: while on assignment in Nicaragua, Veil was tipped off by old friend Harrison Barton (Dwight Schultz) that an illegal covert U. S. Army counterinsurgency campaign was underway in nearby Chile. The two men entered the jungle and infiltrated the base. While hiding from the soldiers, Veil witnessed and photographed four rebels being captured and hanged. But back in the present, Hale suggests that the hanging incident was not as it appeared.
19	"Doppelganger"	Ian Toynton	Schuyler Kent	March 18, 1996
Shaken by his encounter with Hale, Veil is unsure whether he can still trust the information in the tablet computer. Veil decides to go to Norman, Ohio to investigate one last name: Clare Hillard (Jamie Rose), a former journalist who was working in the same area of South America where Veil believes he photographed "Hidden Agenda". Doug Baldwin plays McClusky. Veil contacts Clare and discovers that she, along with several people in town, already seem to know him. Veil is surprised to learn that "Thomas Veil" already has a home, a studio and career as a photographer in town. Veil tries to determine his double's intentions, but a murder investigation suddenly brings the police to his doorstep. In order to prove his innocence and the existence of his duplicate, Veil must provide the original negative of "Hidden Agenda" to his public defender Jane Butler (Mia Korf). But this may be yet another trap involving the other Thomas Veil.
20	"Through a Lens Darkly" "Shutterbug"	Ian Toynton	Art Monterastelli	April 8, 1996
In a Michigan bus station, Veil is monitoring a drop used by the conspiracy when he is kidnapped and injected with a drug. He awakens to find himself outside an apparently deserted house outside town. His kidnappers trap Veil inside and force him to re-experience formative memories from his past, first pleasant ones from his childhood and young adulthood, then much more painful ones from his recent past. The memories are all connected to Laura (Sydney Walsh), a young woman who Veil was once very close to. Veil learns that an operative of the conspiracy (Sam Anderson) has been ordered to break him and has been inducing the hallucinations as part of his efforts. The operative offers to end Veil's torment if he hands over the negatives.
21	"Dark Side of the Moon" "The Mugging"	James Whitmore, Jr.	David Ehrman	April 15, 1996
While still in Michigan, Veil tries to convince a contact to disclose a list of conspiracy operatives. Veil is suddenly attacked by a conspiracy operative looking for the negatives. Veil flees, but is assaulted by a member of violent street gang, who incapacitates Veil and steals the bag containing the negatives. Veil locates the gang member, only to discover that the operative has already found and killed him and taken the negatives. Veil is trapped inside the gang's territory with his only ally a teenage runaway named Margo (Juliet Tablak). Veil has to avoid "Mackie" (Trevor Goddard) and his gang, who hold Veil responsible for their member's death and locate the operative before the conspiracy can extract him and the negatives.
22	"Calaway"	Reza Badiyi	Joel Surnow	April 29, 1996
Veil has been unable to sleep for more than a week. His doctor notices a possible connection between his condition and the sanitarium where he was first confined after his erasure. Veil returns to Calaway Psychiatric Hospital in Illinois, looking for answers. He is discovered and placed under the care of "Dr. Novik" (Jay Arlen Jones), who Veil once knew as Joe (J. C.) Carter, one of his fellow patients from his first stay. Dr. Novik asks Veil to submit to the inevitable and hand over the negatives while Veil tries to remind Novik of the man he once was. At the insistence of the conspiracy, Novik turns up the pressure on Veil, so Veil must escape Calaway before the conspiracy renders its final judgment upon him.
23	"Zero Minus Ten" "Coma"	James Whitmore, Jr.	Jane Espenson	May 6, 1996
Veil awakens in an Illinois hospital with no memory of how he got there. The doctors tell him that he was in a car accident and has been in a coma for three months. His wife Alyson welcomes him home as though nothing has changed, but Veil is immediately suspicious, believing that the "coma" is yet another ruse by the conspiracy. His certainty is shaken when his best friend Larry Levy (Murray Rubinstein) shows up alive and well and knowing details that only Larry would know. Alyson insists that Veil's life on the run was a coma-induced delusion and Levy seems unconvinced by Veil's incredible story. Veil goes looking for evidence to prove his suspicions as he tries to remember where the negatives for "Hidden Agenda" are located.
24	"Bed of Lies" "Marathon"	Stephen Thomas Stafford	Art Monterastelli	May 13, 1996
While examining the negative to "Hidden Agenda", Veil discovers a radio frequency number connected to the conspiracy. He monitors the frequency and learns of the conspiracy's interest in a Washington DC research center called "Heritage House". Veil visits the center and narrowly avoids being killed as the entire staff is assassinated by unknown gunmen. Veil questions the lone survivor, a secretary named Jenny Hsu (Kayla Blake), who explains that Heritage House is actually a front for an FBI task force investigating the very organization that erased his identity. A second attempt on Jenny's life convinces Veil that they are somehow being tracked. Veil contacts the FBI and Assistant Director Stanley Robman (Nicolas Surovy) offers his help. Veil learns from the FBI that Hidden Agenda has been altered and that it may be evidence of a much greater crime. But Veil does not know if he can trust Robman and the FBI.
25	"Exposed" "Gemini"	Stephen Thomas Stafford	Lawrence Hertzog & Art Monterastelli	May 20, 1996
Veil avoids the operatives of the conspiracy to retrieve the FBI's case file on the mysterious organization that erased him. Veil learns from the file that an FBI operative named "Gemini" was investigating the conspiracy and compiled the FBI dossier. Taking refuge in Gemini's last known safe house in Virginia, Veil discovers the original untouched negative of "Hidden Agenda". The untouched negative appears to connect the conspiracy to the highest levels of government. Veil contacts Senator William Wallace (Hal Linden), who may be the next target of the conspiracy, to enlist his help. Wallace agrees and offers to convince "the number two man at the FBI", Robert Barton (Francis X. McCarthy), to investigate, but when Wallace later claims not to know Veil, Veil realizes that the senator has been compromised. Veil tracks down Barton to find out the truth, but what he discovers about the conspiracy, Gemini and "Hidden Agenda" leave him questioning everything he thought he knew.

== Home media ==
- Image Entertainment (under license from ABC) released Nowhere Man: The Complete Series on DVD in Region 1 on December 27, 2005.

== Ratings ==
No.	Title	Air Date	Time	Rank	Rating	Viewers (Millions)
1	Absolute Zero	August 28, 1995	Monday at 9:00 P.M.	#68 of 92	5.7	5.4
2	Turnabout	September 4, 1995	Monday at 9:00 P.M.	#86 of 96	3.9	3.7
3	The Incredible Derek	September 11, 1995	Monday at 9:00 P.M.	#96 of 109	3.7	3.5
4	Something About Her	September 18, 1995	Monday at 9:00 P.M.	#95 of 108	3.6	3.5
5	Paradise on Your Doorstep	September 25, 1995	Monday at 9:00 P.M.	#98 of 110	3.5	3.4
6	The Spider Webb	October 9, 1995	Monday at 9:00 P.M.	#91 of 99	3.0	2.9
