= How to Conquer America in One Night =

- French: Comment conquérir l'Amérique en une nuit
- Directed by: Dany Laferrière
- Written by: Dany Laferrière
- Produced by: Daniel Morin
- Starring: Maka Kotto; Michel Mpambara
- Cinematography: Robert Vanherweghem
- Edited by: Hélène Girard
- Music by: Serge Nicol
- Production company: Films Équinoxe
- Release date: August 27, 2004 (MWFF)
- Running time: 96 minutes
- Country: Canada
- Language: French

How to Conquer America in One Night (French: Comment conquérir l'Amérique en une nuit) is a Canadian comedy film, directed by Dany Laferrière and released in 2004. The film centres on the relationship between Fanfan (Maka Kotto), a Haitian Canadian man who has resided in Montreal for 20 years but still does not feel entirely at home in Canada, and his nephew Gégé (Michel Mpambara), who has recently come to Montreal to visit his uncle before moving to the United States to pursue his vision of the American Dream, which mainly involves eating hamburgers and seducing large-breasted blonde women.

The cast also includes Sonia Vachon, Sophie Faucher, Maxime Morin, Widemir Normil, Michel Barrette, Pascale Montpetit, Pierre Curzi, Claude Charron and Fabienne Colas.

Fanfan is a character who frequently recurs in Laferrière's work, including the concurrent film On the Verge of a Fever (Le Goût des jeunes filles), which was directed by John L'Ecuyer from Laferrière's screenplay and also premiered in fall 2004.

The film, Laferrière's first time directing one of his own screenplays, premiered at the Montreal World Film Festival on August 27, 2004, before opening commercially on September 10.

Hélène Girard received a Jutra Award nomination for Best Editing at the 7th Jutra Awards in 2005.
