= Symbiosis (1976 film) =

- Directed by: David Cox
- Written by: David Cox
- Produced by: David Cox
- Narrated by: Bill McVean
- Animation by: Ken Stephenson
- Release date: August 1976 (OIAF)
- Running time: 3 minutes
- Country: Canada

Symbiosis is a Canadian animated short film, directed by David Cox and released in 1976. Inspired by the ongoing controversy around land tenancy on the Toronto Islands, the film centres on the residents of an unnamed island that is under threat of being taken over by its occasional visitors.

The film won the award for best film under three minutes at the 1976 Ottawa International Animation Festival, and was a Canadian Film Award nominee for Best Animated Short at the 28th Canadian Film Awards in 1977.
