= Christopher's Movie Matinée =

- Directed by: Mort Ransen
- Produced by: Joe Koenig
- Cinematography: Martin Duckworth
- Edited by: Mort Ransen
- Music by: 3's a Crowd; Darius Brubeck; Sandy Crawley; Amos Garrett; William Hawkins
- Production company: National Film Board of Canada
- Release date: 1968
- Running time: 88 minutes
- Country: Canada
- Language: English
- Budget: $81,342

Christopher's Movie Matinée is a Canadian documentary film, directed by Mort Ransen and released in 1968. Depicting the youth counterculture hippie movement in the Toronto district of Yorkville, the film was unusual in that it directly engaged the teenagers as active participants rather than subjects, depicting their own debates about what kind of film Ransen should make about them and incorporating footage directly filmed by the youth with personal video cameras. The film includes the group organizing a protest against Toronto Board of Control member Allan Lamport's efforts to crack down on the hippie movement in the city; it ends when the filmmakers are recalled to Montreal by the National Film Board of Canada after being accused in the Toronto press of instigating the protest rather than merely depicting it.

The film was named for, and includes music from, the contemporaneous album Christopher's Movie Matinée by influential Canadian folk music band 3's a Crowd.

The film did not receive widespread theatrical distribution, instead being shown primarily in private screenings for schools and organizations until it was broadcast on CBC Television in 1969. Ransen appeared in an episode of the network's documentary series New Film Makers on April 23, showing excerpts of the film, before the full feature film was broadcast in its entirety by the network's Canadian Feature Films series on April 27. It was also screened in the Director's Fortnight stream at the 1969 Cannes Film Festival. It earned a Certificate of Merit at the 1970 Adelaide Film Festival and received a citation as the Recommendation of the Adult Education Centres Jury at the International Filmfestival Mannheim-Heidelberg.

== Works cited ==
- Evans, Gary (1991). In the National Interest: A Chronicle of the National Film Board of Canada from 1949 to 1989. University of Toronto Press. ISBN 0802027849.
