= Julius Kohanyi =

Canadian film director and writer (1932–2024)

- Born: 25 August 1932; Kelowna, British Columbia, Canada
- Died: 13 March 2024 (aged 91); Toronto, Ontario, Canada
- Occupations: Film director; television producer; writer
- Years active: c. 1960s–2024
- Notable work: Summer's Children, Sprockets
- Spouse: Susan Kavesh (m. 1982)

Julius Kohanyi (25 August 1932 – 13 March 2024) was a Canadian film director, television producer and writer.

== Early life ==
Kohanyi was born in Kelowna to Hungarian parents on 25 August 1932. Shortly after his birth, Kohanyi's parents took him to Hungary, returning to Canada in 1947. Kohanyi grew up in Kelowna, Hungary, and Toronto.

== Career ==
Kohanyi worked at multiple jobs, including a stint as an usher in cinema, during his early career. He first directed the film The Herring Belt, in 1964. Kohanyi's career spanned over 60 years. Throughout his career, he directed over 40 films, including Summer's Children. Kohanyi was an executive producer in CBC TV Drama for two years, a post he was appointed to in 1974, during which he directed Sprockets. He was also a writer, being the author of a trilogy of 3 books titled "The Rad Trilogy".

== Personal life and death ==
Kohanyi resided in Toronto with his wife schoolteacher Susan Kavesh, whom he married in 1982. He died on 13 March 2024, at age 91.
