= Far from Home: The Adventures of Yellow Dog =

- Theatrical release poster
- Directed by: Phillip Borsos
- Written by: Phillip Borsos; David M. Evans (uncredited)
- Produced by: Peter O'Brian
- Starring: Bruce Davison; Mimi Rogers; Jesse Bradford; Tom Bower
- Cinematography: James Gardner
- Edited by: Sidney Wolinsky
- Music by: John Scott
- Distributed by: 20th Century Fox
- Release date: January 13, 1995
- Running time: 82 minutes
- Countries: Canada; United States
- Language: English
- Box office: $11.6 million

Far from Home: The Adventures of Yellow Dog is a 1995 survival adventure film starring Jesse Bradford and directed by Phillip Borsos in his final directorial film. Its cumulative box office earnings were $11,642,946 according to Box Office Mojo.

== Plot ==
Thirteen-year-old Angus McCormick lives near a small town in British Columbia with his parents John and Katherine and eight-year-old brother Silas. He runs his paper route, learns wilderness skills from his father, and spends time with his friends David and Sara. One afternoon, Angus finds a stray Yellow Labrador Retriever that he names Yellow.

Several days later, while Angus, his father, and Yellow Dog are traveling along the coast of British Columbia, turbulent waters capsize their boat. John is rescued by helicopter and transported to a hospital for minor injuries, but Angus and Yellow are stranded on the coast far from civilization.

After spending nine days on the shore, Angus realizes that he and Yellow must reach civilization on their own. With the nearest lighthouse located about twenty miles south, he begins his journey across one of the largest wildernesses in the province.

Over the next several days, Angus struggles to find food to sustain himself and Yellow. One day, he tumbles down a cliff, breaking his left wrist. Later that day, Angus spots the lighthouse on a hill on the other side of a lake. He builds a raft and with the aid of his dog paddles to the opposite shore.

Angus and Yellow reach the lighthouse but find it deserted with no additional food or supplies. Angus discovers a logging road running down another hill several miles away and decides to head there in the hopes of finding help. They reach a narrow gorge with a river below. Angus finds a fallen tree across the top of the gorge and decides to cross it, but the other side is blocked by other fallen trees.

Just as Angus and Yellow begin to give up hope, a plane flies overhead. The pilot informs the rescue teams of his discovery, and a rescue helicopter is dispatched to pick up the boy and dog. One of the search team members is lowered and grabs Angus, but Yellow is knocked off the tree into the river. He survives the fall and swims to shore, but he is left to fend for himself.

Angus blames himself for losing Yellow but refuses to give up hope that his dog is still alive. One afternoon, he blows his dog whistle one last time and an exhausted Yellow appears. Angus and his family rejoice over the return of Yellow.

== Cast ==
- Jesse Bradford as Angus McCormick
- Bruce Davison as John McCormick
- Mimi Rogers as Katherine McCormick
- Tom Bower as John Gale
- Joel Palmer as Silas McCormick
- Margot Finley as Sara
- Josh Wannamaker as David Finlay
- Dakota as Yellow
- St. Clair McColl as Himself

== Critical response ==
On the review aggregator website Rotten Tomatoes, 63% of 8 critics' reviews are positive, with an average rating of 6.0/10.
