= Orca's Song =

1987 Canadian picturebook by Anne Cameron

- Front cover of Orca's Song
- Author: Anne Cameron
- Illustrator: Nelle Olsen
- Language: English
- Genre: Children's picturebook
- Publisher: Harbour Publishing
- Publication date: 1987
- Publication place: Canada
- Media type: Paperback
- Pages: 25
- ISBN: 0-920080-29-4
- OCLC: 633301107

Orca's Song is a 1987 picturebook written by Anne Cameron and illustrated in black and white by Nelle Olsen. Published by Harbour Publishing, the book is an adaptation of a Pacific Northwest Indigenous story. Orca's Song is a pourquoi story about a black orca who falls in love with an osprey; the two mate to create a baby orca with the black and white patterning found on the whales.

While some reviewers appreciated the art and text of the story, it received criticism from Indigenous authors and scholars who disputed Cameron's claim of sole authorship and copyright for the story. Consequently, reprints of the book began to attribute the storyteller Klopinum for the story's inspiration although Cameron retained sole authorship credit and copyright. The story has also been noted as an early example of a lesbian relationship (between Orca and Osprey) in picturebook literature and one of the few such picturebooks published before 2000 to lack a moralising tone.

== Plot ==
A pourquoi story, Orca's Song explains the origins of the black and white patterning of the orca. In the story, Orca is an all-black whale who begins to pine for Osprey and begins to help her catch salmon. Osprey in turn explains the experience of flight to Orca and begins to bring her gifts from land. The two fall in love but struggle to reconcile their disparate origins. One day, Orca leaps from the sea and Osprey swoops towards the waves and their bodies come into contact.

They birth a baby orca with black and white coloration who can leap higher from the water than its whale mother but cannot fly. Twice annually, in the spring and fall, women on Vancouver Island play music on the western coast and orcas go there and sway to their tunes and sing their own songs. Ospreys attend this gathering and sing along uniting the sky, land, and earth. The story ends by noting that luck is bestowed upon anyone whom a whale splashes.

== Writing and publication ==
Orca's Song was written by European Canadian lesbian author Anne Cameron of British Columbia. Cameron liked adapting First Nations stories into picturebooks and had previously published the children's book How the Loon Lost Her Voice in 1985. She credited a storyteller named Klopinum whom she knew from her youth on Vancouver Island for the story on which Orca's Song was based and said that Klopinum had given Cameron permission to share the story, although this credit was not presented alongside the text of Orca's Song until reprints of the work in 1993. The work was illustrated by Nelle Olsen who used black and white line drawings for the interior images of the story and a Northwest Coast artistic style for the cover. Harbour Publishing released the 25-page book in 1987. Marlene R. Atleo, reviewing the book in 2006, wrote that it was intended for readers of second grade and above.

== Reception ==
Orca's Song has received criticism from Indigenous scholars and authors. Atleo of the Ahousaht First Nation wrote that Orca's Song was a "very 'New Age' rendering of this story [which], even with West Coast symbols, obscures any semblance of the story it might be based on." Cameron was confronted by a group of Indigenous female writers at the 1988 International Women's Book Fair regarding her claim of sole authorship and copyright for Orca's Song and other children's books adapted from First Nations stories. Printings of the book from 1993 onward credited Klopinum but Cameron retained sole authorship, copyright, and royalties for the works.

Other reviewers have responded positively to the story. Writing in CM: A Reviewing Journal of Canadian Materials for Young People, Gerri Young described the work as having "the flavour of the country of origin, [being] easily understood by the present-day audience, and hav[ing] the feeling of the oral telling", ultimately describing Orca's Song as "a particularly poignant story". In Canadian Children's Literature, Kevin McCabe called Olsen's illustrations "creative and finished designs" that supported Cameron's text.

Orca's Song was included in researcher Jeff Sapp's 2010 list of children's books with lesbian or gay (LG) characters. Sapp described the book as stunning and wrote that it was among the few stories with LG characters (Orca and Osprey) "that contains no overt moralising so often found" in children's books with LG characters published before 2000. Atleo said that while transformation was present as a theme throughout Pacific Northwest Indigenous cultures, the ability of members of the same sex to reproduce was not, leading to "an underlying dissonance that Cameron cannot calm".

== See also ==
- Lesbian literature
