= Hélène Girard =

Canadian film editor

Hélène Girard is a Canadian film editor. She is most noted as co-winner with Jean Beaudin of the Canadian Film Award for Best Editing at the 28th Canadian Film Awards in 1977, for their work on the film J.A. Martin Photographer (J.A. Martin, photographe).

== Filmography ==
- Les filles c'est pas pareil - 1974
- J.A. Martin Photographer (J.A. Martin, photographe) - 1977
- La p'tite violence - 1977
- Fuir - 1980
- Frédéric - 1980
- J'avions 375 ans - 1982
- Head Start: Meeting the Computer Challenge - 1984
- The Great Land of Small (C'est pas parce qu'on est petit qu'on peut pas être grand!) - 1986
- J'osais pas rien dire - 1986
- Si jamais tu pars - 1986
- Basements - 1987
- Death of a Silence (Le Lys cassé) - 1987
- Tadpole and the Whale (La Grenouille et la baleine) - 1988
- Looking for Eternity (Portion d'éternité) - 1989
- The Case of the Witch Who Wasn't (Pas de répit pour Mélanie) - 1990
- You're Beautiful, Jeanne (T'es belle Jeanne) - 1990
- Campioana - 1990
- Nelligan - 1991
- Solo - 1991
- The Clean Machine (Tirelire, combines & Cie) - 1992
- Quand la vie se retire - 1992
- The Sex of the Stars (Le Sexe des étoiles) - 1993
- Jerome's Secret (Le secret de Jérôme) - 1994
- Anchor Zone - 1994
- Tendre guerre - 1995
- The Old Lady and the Pigeons (La vieille dame et les pigeons) - 1996
- Bandes-hommages 100 ans de cinéma - 1996
- Le grand tumulte - 1996
- The Hunger - 1997
- Chile, Obstinate Memory (Chile, la memoria obstinada) - 1997
- The Worst Witch - 1998-99
- The Collectors - 1999
- Emergency! A Critical Situation - 1999
- The Orphan Muses (Les Muses orphelines) - 2000
- Karmen Geï - 2001
- Une goutte dans l'océan - 2001
- How to Conquer America in One Night (Comment conquérir l'Amérique en une nuit) - 2004
- Soraida, une femme de Palestine - 2004
- Pied-de-biche - 2005
- From My Window, Without a Home… (From My Window, Without a Home…) - 2006
- The Challenge in Old Crow - 2006
- A Sunday in Kigali (Un dimanche à Kigali) - 2006
- Twilight (La Brunante) - 2007
- I Killed My Mother (J'ai tué ma mére) - 2009
- Falardeau - 2010
- Hope Builders (Les Porteurs d'espoir) - 2010
- Mokhtar - 2010
- The Hole Story (Trou story) - 2011
- Beyond the Walls (Hors les murs) - 2012
- Élegie - 2012
- Catalpa - 2012
- Le vieil âge et le rire - 2012
- Une constitution - 2013
- Sunday, We'll See... (Dimanche, nous verrons...) - 2013
- The Outlaw League (La gang des hors-la-loi) - 2014
- All Yours (Je suis à toi) - 2014
- Lise Watier, une vie à entreprendre - 2015
- Manic - 2017
- Third Wedding (Troisièmes noces) - 2018

== Awards ==
Award	Year	Category	Work	Result	Ref(s)
Canadian Film Awards	1978	Best Editing	J.A. Martin Photographer (J.A. Martin, photographe)	Won	
Genie Awards	2001	Best Editing	The Orphan Muses (Les Muses orphelines)	Nominated	
Jutra Awards	2001	Best Editing	The Orphan Muses (Les Muses orphelines)	Nominated	
Jutra Awards	2003	Best Editing	Karmen Geï	Nominated	
Jutra Awards	2005	Best Editing	How to Conquer America in One Night (Comment conquérir l'Amérique en une nuit)	Nominated	
Jutra Awards	2007	Best Editing	A Sunday in Kigali (Un dimanche à Kigali)	Nominated	
Jutra Awards	2013	Best Editing	Beyond the Walls (Hors les murs)	Nominated	
