= Angel Square =

- Directed by: Anne Wheeler
- Written by: James DeFelice; Anne Wheeler
- Based on: Angel Square by Brian Doyle
- Produced by: Arvi Liimatainen
- Starring: Jeremy Radick; Guillaume Lemay-Thivierge; Nicola Cavendish; Leon Pownall; Michel Barrette; Ned Beatty
- Cinematography: Tobias A. Schliessler
- Edited by: Lenka Svab; Peter Svab
- Music by: George Blondheim
- Production company: National Film Board of Canada
- Distributed by: Disney Channel
- Release date: October 4, 1991 (VIFF)
- Running time: 104 minutes
- Country: Canada
- Language: English

Angel Square (also known as The Comic Book Christmas Caper) is a 1991 Canadian film directed by Anne Wheeler and starring Ned Beatty and Nicola Cavendish. The film is based on the novel of the same title by Brian Doyle.

== Premise ==
In 1945, a boy investigates after his friend's father has his sense of security violated when he is brutally beaten by an unknown attacker while working.

== Cast ==
- Jeremy Radick as Tommy
- Julie Bond as Mother
- Jay Brazeau as Mr. Rosenberg
- Nicola Cavendish as Aunt Dottie
- Brian Dooley as Bert
- Guillaume Lemay-Thivierge as Coco Laframboise
- Leon Pownall as Blue Cheeks
- Vlasta Vrána as Logg
- Paul Whitney as Mr. Ritchie
- Michel Barrette as Voice
- Ned Beatty as Officer Ozzie O'Driscoll

== Production ==
Although Doyle's original novel had been set in Ottawa, Wheeler was not able to shoot the film there as the architecture of the Lower Town neighbourhood had become too modern for a film set in the 1940s. Instead she shot the film in Edmonton, whose Old Strathcona neighbourhood still possessed more appropriate period detail.

It is unclear, however, whether the film version is canonically set in Ottawa or Edmonton, with both cities having been claimed by different sources. Gerald Pratley, further, ascribes the film with a setting of Winnipeg in his book A Century of Canadian Cinema.

Although the film was finished by fall 1990, its distribution arrangements were not finalized, and would have led to the film getting only a limited release at film festivals in the fall before opening commercially in the spring or summer of 1991 despite its Christmas theme. Accordingly, the producers decided to delay release until 1991 so that the film could properly go into general release close to Christmas.

== Distribution ==
The film premiered at the 1991 Vancouver International Film Festival, before going into commercial release in November.

== Critical response ==
Rick Groen of The Globe and Mail gave the film a middling review, writing that "Wheeler does have a keen eye for period detail (she's had practice - this is a chronological continuation of Bye Bye Blues), and handles the child actors well. As a director, positioning the camera, she's fine with the intimate moments, but her work in the action sequences borders on amateurish. The climax, the inevitable chase scene, is shot so claustrophobically that the motion drains right out of the picture - it's about as kinetic as a rusty Lada on an uphill grade. To say there's a need for good family movies is a truism. But to applaud every sincere attempt to meet that need is no more than patronizing. Angel Square is no more than well-intentioned. Its attempt is honest, its achievement mediocre."

For the Edmonton Journal, Marc Horton wrote that "For adult viewers, there's not much doubt that Tommy will puzzle the whole thing out and find out just who beat Sammy's father and why. And even given the reason - ugly anti-Semitism - there is a "niceness" to this film which sets it apart from so much of the other movie fare out there. What the film lacks is grit. The movie is at its very best in the fantasy sequences where Tommy becomes a figure of heroic, romantic, elegant proportions. Radick, a young actor who is not always that compelling, seems to soar in these scenes when he assumes the role of a tough-talking Bogart character or a stylish and cosmopolitan Fred Astaire. And the music is tremendous. Wheeler collaborated with George Blondheim on the two main songs and both are superb, although the nod must go to a tune called Such Magic, which is sung by Big Miller in the film. It's very special. But whether this whole thing works for its intended audience is another matter. The pacing is slow and there are noticeable sags throughout, particularly when you keep in mind that the under-12 set is accustomed to action sequences delivered in a steady rhythm. And it's doubtful whether nostalgia will wash with that sort of audience as well."

== Awards ==
Award	Date of ceremony	Category	Recipient	Result	Ref.
Genie Awards	1991	Best Adapted Screenplay	Anne Wheeler, James DeFelice	Nominated	
Genie Awards	1991	Best Overall Sound	Garrell Clark, Paul A. Sharpe	Won	
Genie Awards	1991	Best Sound Editing	Alison Grace, Gael MacLean, Anke Bakker, Debra Rurak, Cal Shumiatcher	Won	
Genie Awards	1991	Best Original Song	George Blondheim, Anne Wheeler "Such Magic"	Won	
