= James DeFelice =

American-Canadian playwright and screenwriter

James DeFelice (January 6, 1937 - October 5, 2024) was an American-Canadian actor, playwright and screenwriter based in Edmonton, Alberta, most noted as writer of the theatrical films Why Shoot the Teacher? and Angel Square.

Born in Lynn, Massachusetts, he was educated at Northeastern University, Tufts University and the Indiana University Bloomington, and was a sportswriter for the Boston Globe before moving to Edmonton in 1969 to become a theatre professor at the University of Alberta. In Edmonton he regularly acted on stage and directed theatre productions, as well as writing stage plays. His plays included The Bird Prince, The Elixir, Fools and Masters, Ladder to the Moon, The Merchants of Dazu, Take Me Where the Water's Warm and A Yard of Pucks.

He also had occasional supporting acting roles in film, including in Harry Tracy, Desperado, Draw!, The Gunfighters, Cowboys Don't Cry, The Assassination of Jesse James by the Coward Robert Ford and Passchendaele.

He retired from the University of Alberta in 2002, but remained an active participant in the city's theatre community until his death in 2024.

== Awards ==
Award	Date of ceremony	Category	Work	Result	Ref.
Canadian Film Awards	1977	Best Adapted Screenplay	Why Shoot the Teacher?	Won	
Genie Awards	1991	Best Adapted Screenplay	Angel Square with Anne Wheeler	Nominated	
Elizabeth Sterling Haynes Awards	1995	Outstanding Fringe Director	Letters in Wartime	Nominated	
Elizabeth Sterling Haynes Awards	1996	Special Achievement	Overall contributions to theatre in Edmonton	Won	
Elizabeth Sterling Haynes Awards	1998	Outstanding Direction in a Play	The Baltimore Waltz	Won	
Elizabeth Sterling Haynes Awards	2004	Outstanding Direction in a Play	Underneath the Lintel	Won	
Elizabeth Sterling Haynes Awards	2007	Outstanding Performance By An Actor In A Leading Role	Closer and Closer Apart	Nominated	
