= Rat Life and Diet in North America =

1968 Canadian film

- Directed by: Joyce Wieland
- Written by: Joyce Wieland
- Produced by: Joyce Wieland
- Cinematography: Joyce Wieland
- Edited by: Joyce Wieland
- Release date: 1968
- Running time: 14 minutes
- Country: Canada
- Language: English

Rat Life and Diet in North America is a Canadian short film, directed by Joyce Wieland and released in 1968. A satirical allegory for the political climate of the 1960s, the film centres on a group of gerbils who are being held as political prisoners by a cat, until eventually escaping to Canada and taking up organic farming.

It was Wieland's first film to explicitly engage themes of Canadian nationalism, reflecting her belief that Canada was the world's last remaining hope for the creation of a peaceful utopian society.

== Distribution ==
The film premiered in November 1968 at Canadian Artists '68, an open art competition staged by the Art Gallery of Ontario.

It was broadcast by CBC Television in 1969, in an episode of the New Film Makers series. It has been frequently exhibited in retrospective shows, both of Wieland's own work, and of the overall history of Canadian film.
