= George Blondheim =

Canadian jazz musician and composer (1956–2020)

George Blondheim (April 10, 1956 – February 1, 2020) was a Canadian jazz musician and composer from Edmonton, Alberta. He is most noted for his work composing music for the films Angel Square, for which he won the Genie Award for Best Original Song at the 12th Genie Awards in 1991, and Whale Music, for which he was nominated for Best Original Score at the 15th Genie Awards in 1994.

He was also a two-time Gemini Award winner, winning for Best Original Music Score for a Program at the 11th Gemini Awards in 1997 for The War Between Us, and Best Original Music Score for a Dramatic Series at the 18th Gemini Awards for Da Vinci's Inquest.

== Selected filmography ==
- The Jewel of the Nile (1985)
- Nine 1/2 Weeks (1986)
- Bye Bye Blues (1989)
- The Gate II: Trespassers (1990)
- Angel Square (1990)
- Sylan Lake Summer (1990)
- Christmas on Division Street (1991)
- Marilyn and Me (1991)
- Whale Music (1994)
- Red Scorpion 2 (1994)
- Probable Cause (1994)
- The Dream is a Wish Your Heart Makes: The Annette Funicello Story(1995)
- The Halfback of Notre Dame (1996)
- The War Between Us (1996)
- Summer of the Monkeys (1998)
- Marine Life (2000)
- Life Size (2000)
- The Wild Guys (2004)
- Chicks with Sticks (2005)
