= Skip Tracer =

- Directed by: Zale Dalen
- Written by: Zale Dalen
- Produced by: Laara Dalen
- Starring: David Petersen; John Lazarus
- Cinematography: Ron Orieux
- Edited by: Zale Dalen
- Music by: J. Douglas Dodd; Linton S. Garner
- Production company: Highlight Communications
- Distributed by: International Film Distributors; G.G. Communications
- Release date: September 13, 1977 (TIFF)
- Running time: 95 minutes
- Country: Canada
- Language: English
- Budget: $250,000

Skip Tracer, also known as Deadly Business, is a Canadian drama film, directed by Zale Dalen and released in 1977.

== Plot ==
The film stars David Petersen as John Collins, a repo man who begins to regret his career choice after being paired with Brent Solverman (John Lazarus), a new trainee whose very different perspective on the job begins to trigger Collins' conscience.

== Production and Release ==
Skip Tracer was Dalen's feature-length directorial debut. The film was made for a budget of just $250,000 after Dalen and his wife Laara, acting as the film's producer, decided that they were dissatisfied with their jobs and wanted to work in film.

The film was released on VHS under the name Deadly Business.

== Reception and legacy ==
Petersen received a Canadian Film Award nomination for Best Actor, and Dalen received the Wendy Michener Award for "most promising new talent", at the 28th Canadian Film Awards. In 1978, Skip Tracer was screened at the Chicago International Film Festivall, and would also become the first Canadian film ever selected for screening at the New York Film Festival.

The film received generally mixed reviews, with Elliott Stein for Film Comment calling the film "more tedious than interestingly harrowing."

It was later screened at the 1984 Festival of Festivals as part of Front & Centre, a special retrospective program of artistically and culturally significant films from throughout the history of Canadian cinema.

The film has gained reputation as a cult classic, with many categorizing it as "Canuxploitation."

In 2022, the film was remastered for the first time on Blu-Ray by Canadian independent distributor, Gold Ninja Video.
