= Phillip Borsos =

Canadian filmmaker (1953–1995)

- Born: May 5, 1953; Hobart, Australia
- Died: February 2, 1995 (aged 41); Vancouver, Canada
- Occupations: Film director; film producer; screenwriter
- Known for: The Grey Fox; Nails; The Mean Season; Bethune: The Making of a Hero; Far from Home: The Adventures of Yellow Dog
- Spouse: Beret Paulsen Borsos
- Children: 2

Phillip Borsos (May 5, 1953 – February 2, 1995) was an Australian-born Canadian film director, producer, and screenwriter. A four-time Canadian Film Award and Genie Award winner and an Academy Award nominee, he was one of the major figures of Canadian and British Columbian filmmaking during the 1980s, earning critical acclaim and accolades at a time when Canadian filmmakers were still struggling to gain attention outside of North America.

== Early life and education ==
Borsos was born in Hobart, Australia, in 1953. His father was a Hungarian sculptor and his mother an English nurse. His family emigrated to Canada when he was five years old, settling in Trail, British Columbia. Borsos showed an early interest in filmmaking while attending high school in Maple Ridge. He acquired a 16mm Bolex camera from his father and began making short films and documentaries. After high school, he studied film at the Banff Centre School for Fine Arts and at the Vancouver School of Art, now the Emily Carr Institute of Art and Design.

== Career ==
His early work included several shorts notable for their cinematography and pacing. In 1976, he incorporated his own company, Mercury Pictures, to produce commercials and sponsored films. Borsos established himself as a filmmaker to watch in the 1970s with three assured short documentaries: Cooperage (1976), Spartree (1977) and Nails (1979). All three won Best Theatrical Short at the Canadian Film Awards, and Nails received a nomination for an Academy Award in the Documentary Short category.

In 1982, at the age of 27, he emerged as a major directing talent with his feature debut, The Grey Fox. It told the story of Bill Miner, Canada's first train robber, and starred Richard Farnsworth as Miner, along with Jackie Burroughs as his mistress. This dramatic, authentic dissection of the Canadian West won seven Genie Awards, including Best Picture and Best Director, as well as being nominated for two Golden Globe Awards, including Best Foreign Film. It is still regarded as one of the best films ever made in Canada.

He followed that success with the serial killer thriller The Mean Season (1985), which starred Kurt Russell and Mariel Hemingway; and the family drama One Magic Christmas (1985), starring Mary Steenburgen and Harry Dean Stanton. Production problems dogged his biopic Bethune: The Making of a Hero (1990), which starred Donald Sutherland as Dr. Norman Bethune, and took four excruciating years to make. There were delays, crew mutinies, technical disasters and endless feuds over the script. On location in remote areas of rural China, with Chinese bureaucrats as his co-producers, Borsos was pushed to his limit. In the end, the producers froze him out of the final editing process and finished the film without him. Regardless, it received critical accolades, and earned him a Genie Award nomination for Best Director.

His final film, Far from Home: The Adventures of Yellow Dog, was shot on and around his summer home on Mayne Island. Based on his script, with characters named after his children, it was his most personal film, an adventure about a boy stranded in the woods with his dog. It was released in 1995, only a month before his passing, and was nominated for Best Family Feature at that year's Young Artist Awards.

He worked on adapting the John Irving book The Cider House Rules for the screen. John Irving credits pursuing the film further because of Borsos having "a stubbornness of heroic proportions" to get the film made.

== Personal life ==
Borsos was married to his wife, Beret, with whom he had two sons.

== Death ==
In early 1994, he was diagnosed with acute myeloblastic leukaemia. He died on February 2, 1995, at age 41.

== Legacy ==
The Whistler Film Festival annually presents the Borsos Competition, a set of juried awards named in honour of Phillip Borsos, for which Canadian films screening at the festival are eligible. Borsos is considered a pioneer of the British Columbian film industry, being among the early directors to utilize and highlight its abundant and visually-stunning landscapes, and helping to establish the province's reputation as Hollywood North.

== Filmography ==
| Year | Film | Director | Producer | Writer | Notes |
|---|---|---|---|---|---|
| 1982 | The Grey Fox | Yes | Yes | No | Genie Award for Best Achievement in Direction; Montréal World Film Festival Award for Best Canadian Film; Nominated - Golden Globe Award for Best Foreign Film; Nominated - Golden Taormina Charybdis |
| 1985 | The Mean Season | Yes | No | No | Cognac Festival du Film Policier TF1 Special Award |
| 1985 | One Magic Christmas | Yes | Yes | Yes | Nominated - Youth in Film Award for Exceptional Feature Film - Drama |
| 1990 | Bethune: The Making of a Hero | Yes | No | No | Nominated - Genie Award for Best Achievement in Direction |
| 1995 | Far from Home: The Adventures of Yellow Dog | Yes | No | Yes | Nominated - Youth in Film Award for Best Family Feature |

=== Short films ===
| Year | Film | Director | Producer | Writer | Notes |
|---|---|---|---|---|---|
| 1974 | Cadillac | Yes | No | No | |
| 1975 | The Barking Dog | Yes | No | No | |
| 1976 | Cooperage | Yes | No | No | Canadian Film Award for Best Theatrical Short Nominated - Chicago International Film Festival Gold Hugo for Best Documentary |
| 1977 | Spartree | Yes | Yes | No | Canadian Film Award for Best Theatrical Short |
| 1977 | Spartree/Making the Film | Yes | No | No | |
| 1979 | Nails | Yes | No | No | Genie Award for Best Theatrical Short; Nominated - Academy Awards for Best Documentary, Short Subjects; Nominated - Genie Award for Outstanding Direction in a Documentary (Non-Feature) |
| 1979 | Racquetball | Yes | No | No | |
