= Cooperage (film) =

1976 Canadian film

- Directed by: Phillip Borsos
- Produced by: Phillip Borsos; Jim Makichuk
- Cinematography: Tamara Sale
- Edited by: Jana Fritsch
- Music by: Ralph Dyck
- Distributed by: National Film Board of Canada; Rocky Mountain Films
- Release date: 1976
- Running time: 17 minutes
- Country: Canada
- Language: English

Cooperage is a 1976 Canadian short documentary film directed by Phillip Borsos. A process documentary about the making of wooden barrels, it won the Canadian Film Award for Best Theatrical Short Film at the 27th Canadian Film Awards.
