= Anne Cameron =

Canadian writer (1938–2022)

Barbara Anne Cameron (August 20, 1938 – November 30, 2022) was a Canadian novelist, poet, screenwriter, short story and children's book writer. She legally changed her name from her birth name, Barbara Cameron, to Cam Hubert and later changed her name from Cam Hubert to Anne Cameron. She has written under these names.

Much of her work was inspired by Northwest Coast First Nations' mythology and culture and centered women as characters asserting non-conformist independence. Cameron was a feminist and was influential in bringing the injustices of patriarchal and colonial systems under scrutiny in her body of work.

== Personal ==
Barbara Anne Cameron was born in Nanaimo, British Columbia on August 20, 1938, the daughter of Annie Cameron (née Graham) and Matthew Angus Cameron. Cameron has described her family as "hard-working, dirt poor," and highlights the peace and order she found in reading books as a child. She began writing at a young age, "scribbling notes on toilet paper," and attended high school in Nanaimo, British Columbia. At fourteen her mother gifted her a typewriter "even though she could not afford it." Cameron did not complete high school, and resisted certain subjects like home economics, preferring instead to spend time in the library.

Cameron lived briefly in Ontario, and in the mainland Vancouver area, but spent most of her life on the Sunshine Coast and Vancouver Island. She married and divorced, and parented 5 children, Alex Hubert, Erin Hubert, Pierre Hubert, Marianne Hubert Jones, and Tara Hubert Miller. Lacking the formal school credits to attend university, and later declined admission by Simon Fraser University as a mature student applicant, Cameron developed her writing through her own ingenuity and collaborative projects with friends. She especially credits time spent listening to storytellers; in particular she references Welsh coal-mining women and North English women storytellers, Chinese elder and Indigenous elder storytellers.

Cameron died in Tahsis, British Columbia on November 30, 2022, at the age of 84.

== Writing ==
Cameron included details about the First Nations storytellers whose stories are reflected in her books in the foreword. She wrote for the Indian Voice in Vancouver. (founded in 1969 by British Columbia Indian Homemakers' Association) and engaged her writing as a form of activism, winning a centennial play-writing contest for Windigo, a stage adaptation of a documentary poem about racism.

One outcome of winning the contest was that the play toured the province and was performed by First Nations inmates in Matsqui Penitentiary, Abbotsford, British Columbia. This experience led her to co-found the Tillicurn Theatre in 1974, a First Nations theatre group formed locally that toured British Columbia and performed "dramatizations of legends and a theatre piece based on the death of Fred Quilt, a Tsilhqotʼin man who died of ruptured guts after an encounter with two RCMP on a back road at night." In an interview with Alan Twigg, referring to this work, she explained that "It started out political. It has become very personal." She wrote screenplays under her name at the time, Cam Hubert; Cameron later added novels and children's books to her body of work.

Her bestselling Daughters of Copper Woman (1981), first printed by the Vancouver feminist collective Press Gang Publishers, is regarded as "a groundbreaking bestseller and women's studies staple" has been reprinted thirteen times. Writing an academic article about Cameron's work, Christine St. Peter contacted Press Gang Publishers and was told that "women from all over the world write to describe how reading Daughters of Copper Woman has changed their lives". Following the breakup of Press Gang Publishers, Cameron was able to find a supportive home at Harbour Publishing of Madeira Park, BC, where she remained the bulk of her writing career, producing over thirty titles in poetry, fiction and children's literature.

=== Themes ===
Cameron's writing focused on British Columbia First Nations lives, mainly in coastal communities such as Powell River and Nanaimo. Her characters explore spirituality, resilience, sexuality, resistance, and healing, and encounter violence, oppression, misogyny, and poverty. Many stories reflect specific Indigenous cultures and myths, and offer a critical feminist, anti-colonial narrative that cherishes creation stories and oral histories (e.g. Daughters of Copper Woman, based on Nuu-chah-nulth myths and legends, and Dzelarhons: Myths of the Northwest Coast). The "destructive impact of white culture on the Indian population, particularly on the cultural position of women" is powerfully communicated in Daughters of Copper Woman (1981), alongside "women's strength, courage, sisterhood, and transmission of knowledge for survival [...] considered basic to the well-being of their society." In a 1988 interview with Alan Twigg, owner and publisher of the newspaper, B.C. BookWorld, Cameron explained "We identify with British Columbia much more than we identify as Canadians" The royalties from her book sales have supported causes that center Indigenous and First Nations' priorities (2002 interview with author reproduced on BC Book Look).

Her 1987 children's book Orca's Song has received criticism from Indigenous scholars and authors. Marlene R. Atleo, a scholar of German descent married into the Ahousaht First Nation, wrote that Orca's Song was a "very 'New Age' rendering of this story [which], even with West Coast symbols, obscures any semblance of the story it might be based on." Cameron was confronted by a group of Indigenous female writers at the 1988 International Women's Book Fair regarding her claim of sole authorship and copyright for Orca's Song and other children's books adapted from First Nations stories. Printings of the book from 1993 onward credited Klopinum, a storyteller she claimed had given her permission to retell the story, but Cameron retained sole authorship, copyright, and royalties for the works.

Cameron published 'A Short Story' in the 1981 'Lesbiantics' issue of Fireweed, a quarterly feminist publication, and has been recognised for foregrounding "the pleasure of women living together and the humour, for example, of a lesbian couple nailing the sign 'Women' over their outhouse". Cameron has said of the characters in her stories, "Their being queer is not why they are in my stories. It's just part of who they are."

== Personal life ==
Among other jobs, she worked as a student psychiatric nurse (1955–1957), as a medical assistant with the Royal Canadian Air Force (1957–1959), an instructor in creative writing at Malaspina College in Powell River, and writer in residence at Simon Fraser University, the institution that had declined her admission as a mature university student years earlier on the basis of insufficient high school credits.

She was celebrated as a queer writer, and identified as lesbian.

Cameron lived her later life in Tahsis, British Columbia with her partner.

== Legacy ==
In 2010, she was awarded the 16th annual George Woodcock Lifetime Achievement Award by the BC Book Awards, and commemorated by the installation of a plaque with her name in the Writers' Walk at the Vancouver Public Library on Georgia Street in Vancouver, British Columbia.

== Works ==
=== Film ===
- Dreamspeaker (1976 episode of For the Record)
- A Matter of Choice (1978 episode of For the Record)
- Drying Up the Streets (1978)
- Ticket to Heaven (1981)
- Homecoming (1981 episode of For the Record)
- The Tin Flute (1983)
- Mistress Madeline (1986)
- Bomb Squad

=== Stage ===
- Cantata: The Story of Sylvia Stark (1989)

=== Fiction ===
- Dreamspeaker (1979)
- Daughters of Copper Woman (1981)
- The Journey (1982)
- Dzelarhons: Mythology of the Northwest Coast (1986)
- Child of Her People (1987)
- Stubby Amberchuk & The Holy Grail (1987)
- Tales of the Cairds (1989)
- Women, Kids & Huckleberry Wine (1989)
- South of an Unnamed Creek (1989)
- Bright's Crossing (1990)
- Escape to Beulah (1990)
- Kick the Can (1991)
- A Whole Brass Band (1992)
- Wedding Cakes, Rats and Rodeo Queens (1994)
- DeeJay & Betty (1994)
- The Whole Fam Damily (1995)
- Selkie (1996)
- Aftermath (1999)
- Those Lancasters (2000)
- Sarah's Children (2001)
- Hardscratch Row (2002)
- Family Resemblances (2003)
- Dahlia Cassidy (2004)

=== Audio ===
- Loon and Raven Tales (1996)

=== Poetry ===
- Earth Witch (1983; reprinted five times)
- The Annie Poems (1987)
- Windigo (1974)

=== Children's books ===
- How Raven Freed the Moon (1985); Illustrated by Tara Miller
- How the Loon Lost her Voice (1985); Illustrated by Tara Miller
- Raven Returns the Water (1987); Illustrated by Nelle Olsen
- Orca's Song (1987); Illustrated by Nelle Olsen
- Lazy Boy (1988); Illustrated by Nelle Olsen
- Spider Woman (1988); Illustrated by Nelle Olsen
- Raven & Snipe (1991); Illustrated by Gaye Hammond
- Raven Goes Berrypicking (1991); Illustrated by Gaye Hammond
- The Gumboot Geese (1992); Illustrated by Jane Huber
- This Place Of World (2014) Illustrated by Ann Cameron
- T'aal: The One Who Takes Bad Children (1998)

== Awards ==
- 1972: Alberta Poetry Competition
- 1973: Bliss Carman Award for Poetry, Banff School of Fine Arts
- 1973: Alberta Poetry Competition
- 1979: Gibson's Literary Award
- 1979: Etrog for best Screenplay - Dreamspeaker (screen) [In 1968, a bronze award statuette was designed by sculptor Sorel Etrog and the award was often referred to as an "Etrog". The awards were formally renamed Genie Awards in 1980.]
- 1979: Gibson Award for Literature - Dreamspeaker (novel)
- 1981: Nominated "Genie Award for Best Adapted Screenplay" - Ticket to Heaven
- 1987: Gemini Award for Best Pay Television Dramatic Series- Mistress Madeline
- 2010: Winner of the 16th George Woodcock Lifetime Achievement Award
