= Dreamspeaker =

1978 novel by Cam Hubert

- Author: Cam Hubert
- Language: English
- Genre: Historical fiction
- Publisher: Avon
- Publication date: 1978
- Pages: 85 pp
- ISBN: 0-380-51086-3
- OCLC: 6804476
- Dewey Decimal: 813/.54 19
- LC Class: PR9199.3.H75 D7 1978

Dreamspeaker is a novel by Canadian author Anne Cameron under the pen name Cam Hubert. It was first published in 1978 by Clarke, Irwin & Company.

It centers on the life of an 11-year-old boy, Peter Baxter, who is committed to an institution for delinquent boys. He was in different foster homes previously. His foster mother left him to starve and never brought him to the doctor, leaving him sick. He ran away by hopping on a train and later meets a First Nations man. The story won the Gibson Award for literature.

In 1976 a television film was directed by Claude Jutra for the CBC Television drama anthology series For the Record, starring Ian Tracey as Peter Baxter. The film won seven Canadian Film Awards, including Non-Feature Direction, Non-Feature Screenplay, Non-Feature Actor (Clutesi), Non-Feature Supporting Actor (Hubert), Non-Feature Musical Score.
