= Sprockets (TV program) =

- Genre: Short film
- Country of origin: Canada
- Original language: English
- No. of seasons: 2

Production
- Producer: Julius Kohanyi
- Running time: 30 minutes

Original release
- Network: CBC Television
- Release: 16 January 1975 – 29 June 1976

Related
- Canadian Film Makers (1974)

Sprockets is a Canadian short film program that aired on CBC Television from 1975 to 1976.

== Premise ==
This program featured short films by independent Canadian filmmakers, including animated and experimental works. Hosts for each episode were selected from Michael Hirsh, Frederick Manter, Whitney Smith, Mark Stone and Jana Veverka.

== Scheduling ==
In its debut season, this half-hour program was broadcast Thursdays at 10:00 p.m. (Eastern) from 16 January to 13 March 1975. It moved to Fridays at 10:30 p.m. from 18 April to 27 June 1975. For the second season, it was broadcast Thursdays at 10:30 p.m. from 11 March to 1 April 1976, then another run on Tuesdays at 10:30 p.m. from 22 June to 29 June 1976.

== Episodes ==
Films included:

- At 99: A Portrait of Louise Tandy Murch — Deepa Saltzman
- The Brotherhood — Al Sens, animation from Vancouver
- Dull Day Demolition — Insight Productions
- The Journals Of Susanna Moodie — Marie Waisberg
- Love at First Sight (short version) — Rex Bromfield
- O Canada — Henning Jacobsen
