= Spartree =

1977 Canadian film

- Directed by: Phillip Borsos
- Produced by: Phillip Borsos; Jim Makichuk
- Cinematography: Tamara Sale; Dave Geddes; Ron Orieux; Jeff Mart
- Production company: Mercury Pictures
- Distributed by: National Film Board of Canada
- Release date: 1977
- Running time: 15 minutes
- Country: Canada
- Language: English

Spartree is a Canadian short documentary film, directed by Phillip Borsos and released in 1977. A process documentary about loggers preparing a spar tree for use in a cable logging operation, it won the Canadian Film Award for Best Theatrical Short Film at the 27th Canadian Film Awards.

To achieve the film's climactic shot, Borsos assembled 12 different cameras around the forest floor.

In addition to its Canadian Film Award win for Best Theatrical Short Film, it won the awards for Best Cinematography in a Non-Feature and Best Sound in a Non-Feature.

The film was also later the subject of Spartree: Making the Film, a documentary about its creation.
