= Joyce Wieland =

Canadian film director

Joyce Wieland OC RCA
- Born: June 30, 1930; Toronto, Ontario, Canada
- Died: June 27, 1998 (aged 67); Toronto, Ontario, Canada
- Education: Central Technical School, Toronto
- Known for: Filmmaker, painter
- Spouse: Michael Snow (1956–1976)
- Awards: Royal Canadian Academy of Arts, Order of Canada (1982), Toronto Arts Foundation's Visual Arts Award

Joyce Wieland OC RCA (June 30, 1930 – June 27, 1998) was a Canadian visual artist and cultural activist who used diverse media to explore feminism and Canadian identity. Wieland found success as a painter when she began her career in Toronto in the 1950s. In 1962, Wieland moved to New York City and expanded her career as an artist by including new materials and mixed media work. During that time, she also rose to prominence as an experimental filmmaker and soon, institutions such as the Museum of Modern Art in New York were showing her films. In 1971, Wieland's True Patriot Love exhibition was the first solo exhibition by a living Canadian female artist at the National Gallery of Canada. In 1982, Wieland received the honour of an Officer of the Order of Canada and in 1987, she was awarded the Toronto Arts Foundation's Visual Arts Award. She was also a member of the Royal Canadian Academy of Arts.

== Biography ==
=== Early life and education ===
Wieland was born on June 30, 1930, in Toronto, Ontario, Canada to British immigrant parents. She was the daughter of Sydney Arthur Wieland and Rosetta Amelia Watson. Wieland's father died from heart disease in 1937, and her mother followed soon after, leaving three children in financially difficult circumstances. Joyce Wieland's aptitude for art was first expressed during her youth, when she made many drawings and comic books.

As a teenager, she attended Central Technical School, where she studied commercial art and graphic design. Wieland first enrolled in dress design and hoped it would help her land a job since she thought art would not be financially rewarding. However, at Central Tech, she met Doris McCarthy who taught at the school. McCarthy's artistic identity inspired Wieland to pursue her own. She saw potential in Wieland and convinced her to transfer into the art department.

== Career ==
After graduating in 1948, Wieland held various jobs as a graphic designer. Wieland's first job was with E.S. & A. Robinson in design packaging, followed by work as a designer at Planned Sales. While working for these agencies, Wieland interacted with many artists and fellow alumni from Central Tech and the Ontario College of Art. During this time, she also kept focusing on her art but wasn't confident in showing off her work yet.

In the early 1950s, Wieland's interest in art films grew and she started attending the Toronto Film Society screenings where she was introduced to the works of filmmakers such as Maya Deren, who later influenced her own films. In 1953, Wieland joined Graphic Associates, an animation studio where she learned techniques she would later apply in her own films.

She had her first solo exhibition in 1960 at the Isaacs Gallery in Toronto, making her the only woman that the prestigious gallery represented and earning her greater recognition for her work. She moved to New York in 1962 and throughout the decade produced most of her experimental films. One of these films is Rat Life and Diet in North America (1968), which presents animals as its main characters. The film is a metaphor for revolution and escape, where cats are the oppressors and the gerbils are the oppressed. The gerbils represent political prisoners in the United States who make their way to freedom in Canada. Rat Life and Diet in North America is an example of how Wieland's concern with political issues, nationalism, symbols, and myths was represented aesthetically through her works.

Wieland's self-identification as a feminist in an era of second wave of feminism also manifested itself through aesthetic means and played an important part in her career as an artist. However, her visual-art practice's popularity remained confined within Canada.

Wieland returned to Toronto in 1971. She said she could not make art anymore in America due to its ideological orientation. Her 1976 film, The Far Shore, had had "devastating appraisals and dismal box office receipts". Following this, her next project—a dramatization of Margaret Laurence's iconic 1974 novel The Diviners — did not get off the ground. In 1987 a retrospective of her work at the Art Gallery of Ontario presented a critical overview of both her visual art practice and her experimental films.

== Work ==
Joyce Wieland was a central figure in Canadian art during the 1960s and 1970s. Though, she began her career as a painter, her work came to explore a wide range of materials and media, including film. The 1960s were a productive time for Wieland, as she responded to the contemporary artistic trends of Pop art and Conceptual art. Joanne Sloane maintains in Joyce Wieland: Life & Work that her encounters with these influences "were always original and idiosyncratic." Sloane identifies the several consistent bodies of Wieland's work that emerged throughout the 1960s as: "quasi-abstract paintings that reveal messages, signs, or erotic drawings; collages and sculptural assemblages; filmic paintings; disaster paintings; plastic film-assemblages; quilts and other fabric-based objects; and language-based works." Her art was often infused with humour, even as it engaged with issues of war, gender, ecology, and nationalism.

Internationally, Wieland is best known as an experimental feminist filmmaker. Her works introduced physical manipulation of the filmstrip that inscribed an explicitly female craft tradition into her films while also playing with the facticity of photographed images. Wieland's output was small but received considerable attention in comparison to other female avant-garde filmmakers of her time. In the 1980s, Wieland focused again on painting, though her representation of the natural environment became less identifiably Canadian and her themes simply ones of nature, love and life.

== Personal life ==
In 1956, Wieland married filmmaker Michael Snow, whom she had met through her job at the animation studio. They remained married for over twenty years until their divorce in 1976. In 1962, Wieland and Snow moved to New York where they lived until 1971.

After she moved back to Toronto in 1971, Wieland maintained a studio practice there until her death on June 27, 1998, from Alzheimer's disease, aged 67. Her funeral was held at St. George by the Grange Anglican Church in Toronto on July 8, 1998. Her ashes are interred in the wall of the church's memorial garden.

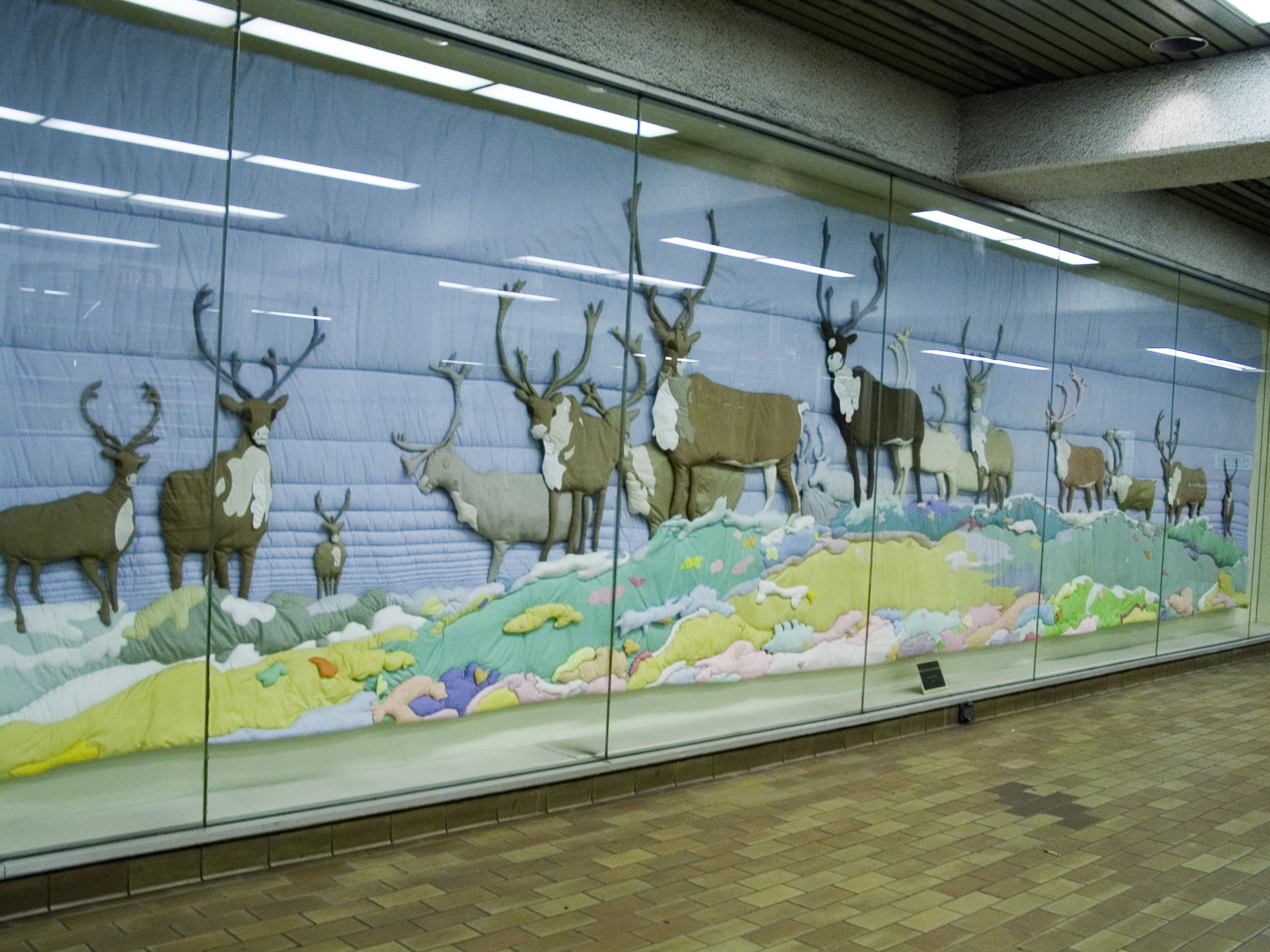
Barren Ground Caribou, a fabric installation by Joyce Wieland at Spadina subway station in Toronto.

She was the aunt of filmmaker and video artist Su Rynard.

== Filmography ==
Year	Title
1956	Tea in the Garden
1958	A Salt in the Park
1963	Larry's Recent Behaviour
1964	Patriotism
1964	Patriotism, Part II
1965	Water Sark
1965	Barbara's Blindness (co-directed with Betty Ferguson)
1964-66	Peggy's Blue Skylight
1967-68	Handtinting
1967-68	1933
1967-68	Sailboat
1968	Rat Life and Diet in North America
1969	Dripping Water (co-directed with Michael Snow)
1969	Cat Food
1969	Reason Over Passion
1972	Pierre Vallières
1973	Solidarity
1976	The Far Shore
1984	A and B in Ontario (co-directed with Hollis Frampton)
1972-86	Birds at Sunrise

== Films about Joyce Wieland ==
- Artist on Fire (Canada, 1987), directed by Kay Armatage

== Visual art ==
- Untitled (Young Couple) (c.1959) (National Gallery of Canada)
- The Lovers No.23 (1961) (National Gallery of Canada)
- Red Fall (1962) (National Gallery of Canada)
- Boat (Homage to D.W. Griffith) (1963) (Private Collection)
- Boat Tragedy (1964) (Art Gallery of Ontario)
  - This piece includes a multi-framed painting of a sinking sailboat. Variations on this work include sinking boats, ocean liners, and plane crashes.
- The Camera's Eyes (1966) (Art Gallery of Hamilton)
- Man Has Reached Out and Touched the Tranquil Moon (1970) (National Gallery of Canada)
- Barren Ground Caribou (1978) (Spadina Subway Station TTC)
- The Birth of Perception (1981) (National Gallery of Canada)

== Influences on other work ==
In 2014, the focus of artist Mark Clintberg's Fogo Island residency was a quilted response to Wieland's work Reason Over Passion. The original work, made in both English and French, was inspired by the motto of the then-Prime Minister Pierre Elliot Trudeau. The quilt was infamously torn apart by his wife, Margaret Trudeau, in a fit of rage at his cold logic during an argument. In her autobiography Beyond Reason (1979), Trudeau narrates that encounter:

One day I did what in Pierre's eyes was the unforgivable. We were having a frosty argument about clothes, and suddenly I flew into the most frenzied temper. I tore off up the stairs to the landing where a Canadian quilt, designed by Joyce Weyland [sic] and lovingly embroidered in a New York loft with Pierre's motto, 'La raison avant la passion,' was hanging. (Its bilingual pair was in the National Gallery.) Shaking with rage at my inability to counter his logical, reasoned arguments, I grabbed at the quilt, wrenched off the letters and hurled them down the stairs at him one by one, in an insane desire to reverse the process, to put passion before reason just this once. Pierre was icy. Vandalizing a work of art; how low could I sink? (Hildegard sewed them all on again, invisibly and without comment, the next morning.). All of it seemed beyond reason to me.

Clintberg's response, sewn in collaboration with the Wind and Waves Artisans' Guild, turns Wieland's work on its head, formally and literally as each piece of the quilt is stitched "wrong"-side up exposing its soft-coloured underbelly. Moreover in the figurative sense, his re-imagining renewed the need for passion instead of reason that Margaret pleaded in her rage. Unlike Wieland's quilts, which hung on the wall, Clintberg's quilts are placed on a random bed each night at the Fogo Island Inn.

== Awards ==
- Victor Martyn Lynch-Staunton Award (1972)
- Officier of the Order of Canada (1982)
- Toronto Arts Foundation's Visual Arts Award (1987)

== Legacy ==
The year 2025 begins a year-long celebration of her work with a major travelling retrospective titled Joyce Wieland: Heart-On organized by the Art Gallery of Ontario and Montreal Museum of Fine Arts. The book "Joyce Wieland: Heart On" edited by Anne Grace and Georgiana Uhlyarik was published by Goose Lane Editions with the Art Gallery of Ontario and Montreal Museum of Fine Arts in 2025. The National Gallery of Canada presented a vignette exhibition titled "Pucker Up! The Lipstick Prints of Joyce Wieland" jointly with the exhibition.
