= Canadian Film Makers (1974 TV program) =

Canadian short film presentation

- Genre: Short films
- Country of origin: Canada
- Original language: English
- No. of seasons: 1

Production
- Producer: Beverly Roberts
- Running time: 30 minutes

Original release
- Network: CBC Television
- Release: 6 January – 31 March 1974

Related
- Canadian Film Makers (1967); Sprockets

Canadian Film Makers is a Canadian short film program that aired on CBC Television in 1974.

== Premise ==
Like its namesake CBC program in 1967, Canadian Film Makers presented various short films during its run. This time, films were solely from independent producers and excluded content from production companies such as the National Film Board of Canada. The CBC paid the producers $3000–3500 per half-hour of film chosen from submitted entries, which were to meet legal and technical requirements.

== Scheduling ==
This half-hour program was broadcast Sundays at 2:30 p.m. (Eastern) from 6 January to 31 March 1974. In the following season, independent films were featured in the new program Sprockets under producer by Julius Kohanyi.

== Episodes ==
Films presented in this series included:

- Amherst Island (Gil Taylor)
- As We Were (Marty Gross)
- Carpathian Tales (Jerzy Fijalkowski)
- Country Music Montreal (Frank Vitale)
- Good Friday in Little Italy (Peter Rowe)
- Limestoned (René Bonnière)
- Not Far From Home (Don Owen)
- The Novitiate (Warren Zucker)
- Progressive Insanities of a Pioneer Farmer (Paul Quigley)
- Space Child (Dennis Millar)
- To A Very Old Woman (Paul Quigley)
