= Canadian Film Makers (1967 TV program) =

Canadian short film presentation

- Genre: Short films
- Written by: Bruce Martin
- Directed by: Flemming Nielsen
- Presented by: Lloyd Robertson
- Country of origin: Canada
- Original language: English
- No. of seasons: 1

Production
- Producer: Rosalind Farber
- Running time: 30 minutes

Original release
- Network: CBC Television
- Release: 19 April – 14 June 1967

Related
- Canadian Film Makers (1974)

Canadian Film Makers is a Canadian short film program that aired on CBC Television in 1967.

== Premise ==
Lloyd Robertson hosted this presentation of Canadian short films. Producers ranged from the National Film Board of Canada to independent filmmakers.

== Scheduling ==
This half-hour program was broadcast Wednesdays at 10:30 p.m. (Eastern) from 19 April to 14 June 1967.

== Episodes ==
Episodes included the following films:

- Free Fall - Arthur Lipsett
- Op Hop - Hop Op - Pierre Hébert
- People Might Laugh at Us - Jacques Godbout
- Rouli Roulant - Claude Jutra
- Sebring - Claude Fournier
- 2½ - Tom Daly
- Zero to Max - Ron Wisman
