= Marty Gross =

Canadian director

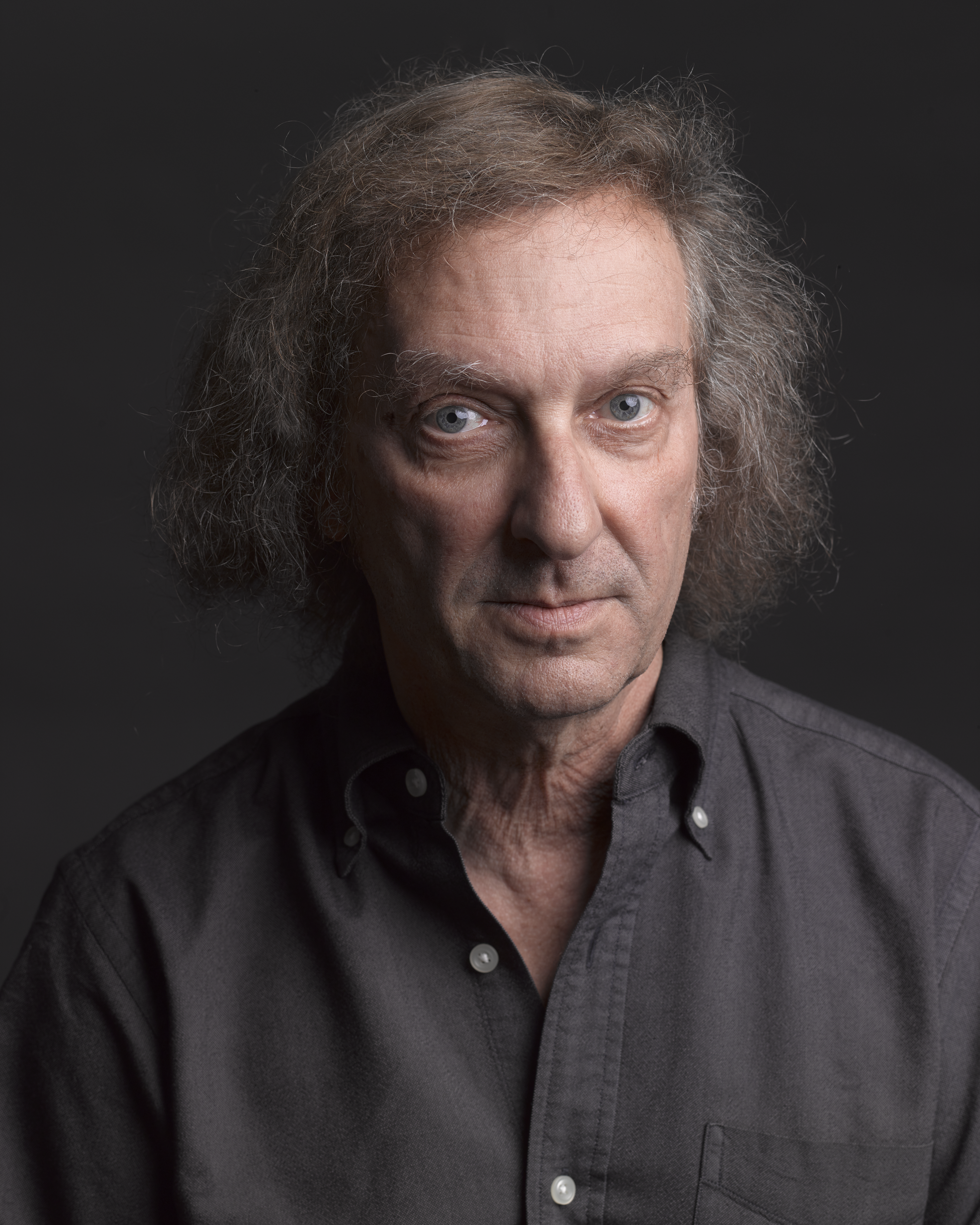
- Born: Martin Gross; May 28, 1948 (age 78); Toronto, Ontario, Canada
- Occupations: Consulting Producer, Director, Producer, Film Editor, Teacher
- Known for: Documentary film making, particularly as it relates to art and culture of Japan. Also as consulting producer, liaison for North American distribution of Japanese films.
- Website: http://www.martygrossfilms.com/ https://mingeifilmarchive.com/

Marty Gross (born May 28, 1948) is a Canadian consulting producer for companies based in North America, Europe and Asia, with focus on Japanese art, film, theatre and crafts. His company, Marty Gross Film Productions, Inc. (founded in 1975), manages one of the most comprehensive websites devoted to films on Japanese cultural and historical subjects.

Since 1974, he has produced and directed films (including As We Are, Potters at Work, The Lovers’ Exile), restored archival films on Japanese arts and crafts (such as The Leach Pottery, Maskiko Village Pottery, Japan 1937), conducted numerous interviews, produced documentaries and coordinated publication of books on the history of Japanese cinema.

== Early life and education ==
Born Martin (Marty) Gross on 28 May 1948 in Toronto, Canada. In his teens, he decided to follow his interest in art and took pottery classes at the Toronto YMHA with noted teacher Beck Breland. Gross eventually became Breland's teaching assistant in her work with children with learning disabilities. Breland encouraged Gross to teach art classes and at art camps as a part-time job. Breland introduced Gross to the Earl's Court Community Centre where he worked with community organizer Margaret Norquay establishing an art program for children.

During the same period, Gross taught art part-time at the Bialik Hebrew Day School and also at the United Synagogue Day School in Toronto and summers at Camp Kawagama, Dorset, Ontario. After a year of travel in Europe, Gross continued his art studies, part-time work as an art teacher and decided to pursue undergraduate studies. However, after 18 months of studying Oriental Studies and Fine Art at York University, Gross decided to leave university to become an apprentice potter in Tokoname, Japan in 1970. In 1972, he partnered with founder of the Youthdale Treatment Centre, Dan Hagler, to create the Tempus Art Centre in Toronto. Gross was the director and lead teacher in the school and tailored programming for students and clients. Gross eventually bought out his partner in 1978 and renamed it Marty Gross Studio. The studio continues to operate as a private art school teaching children ceramics and pottery, film animation, still photography, drawing, painting and printmaking.

In 1972 Gross began, with psychodramatist Marcia Karp, teaching the patients of the Mental Retardation Centre of Toronto – now known as the Surrey Place Centre. It is during this time that he also observed how art reached disturbed children at the art school. He decided to capture his methods of teaching art to autistic children and their experiences in the art class, which becomes his first documentary film As We Are, produced in 1974. Later in 1975, Gross traveled back to Japan to continue his pottery apprenticeship in Naha, Okinawa, which marked the beginning of Gross's career in film, pottery and producing.

== Career ==
=== Art studio director, art teacher ===
In the late 1960s when Gross was teaching art part-time at the Bialik Hebrew Day School, he met Dan Hagler who was founding the Youthdale Treatment Centre in Toronto, which is a Toronto-based treatment centre responding to the mental health needs of Canadian children and their families.

After seeing Gross work effectively with children in an art studio environment, Hagler and Gross created a partnership in a new venture, Tempus Art Centre, which opened in January 1972. The centre was established as an art studio and school to serve the children and adults of the community and the clients at Youthdale. Gross was responsible for creating programming centred around each person and his/her individual interest and to run the school while Hagler backed the school with his business experience and financial support. The school became popular for both Youthdale clients and adults and children in the community. In 1987, Gross bought Hagler's share of the business and renamed the school, The Marty Gross Studio and continues to operate it in Toronto today.

=== Film director and producer ===
Influenced by his experience with teaching children at his art studio in Toronto, Gross decided to direct and produce a documentary in 1974, As We Are which follows autistic children and observes the difficult process of their education. The film captured the challenges, struggles and eventual breakthroughs of the children guided by their teachers in an art studio. The 30-minute film was a breakthrough project for Gross and earned him four top prizes (Grand Prize, International Film Jury, Oberhausen Film Festival, 1975; Award for Screenplay and Directing, Ministry of Culture, North Rhine-Westfalia, Oberhausen 1975; Honourable Mention, Interfilm Jury; Honourable Mention; Childfilm Festival, Vancouver 1976) and subsequent invitations to be shown at several international film festivals including the London Film Festival.

During 1975 as he continued as a pottery apprentice in Japan, and travelled around Japan to select pottery villages for a film which would become Potters At Work. The villages Onda and Koishibara on the island of Kyushu in Southern Japan were selected. The film is "about the harmony, simplicity and beauty that still surround the working patterns of a diminishing group of rural artisans" and follows two of Japan's important potters from the folk craft "mingei" tradition, Shigeki Sakamoto and Kumao Ohta. He created a complex soundtrack composed entirely of the sounds taken at the pottery site, and choose not to use narration or musical tracks in order to evoke the raw and true nature of the environment. In 1976 and 1977, he edited and released Potters at Work as a short, documentary film which won three prizes (Best Editing; Canadian Film Awards,1977; "Silver Boomerang;" Melbourne Film Festival, Asolo Prize, 1978; Best Visual Treatment of the Life of an Artist, Treviso 1978), in festivals in Europe, the US, Hong Kong and Australia. The film "speaks through sound and images to portray a remote mountain community where everyday family life and creative work are commingled in an atmosphere that seems timeless and serene. Since its initial release, it has been subsequently broadcast on numerous television channels around the world in English and French versions. The film gained attention in Japan and validated Gross as a producer and introduced him to Japanese artists, film directors and writers. A digitally re-mastered version of Potters a Work was released in 2007 on DVD.

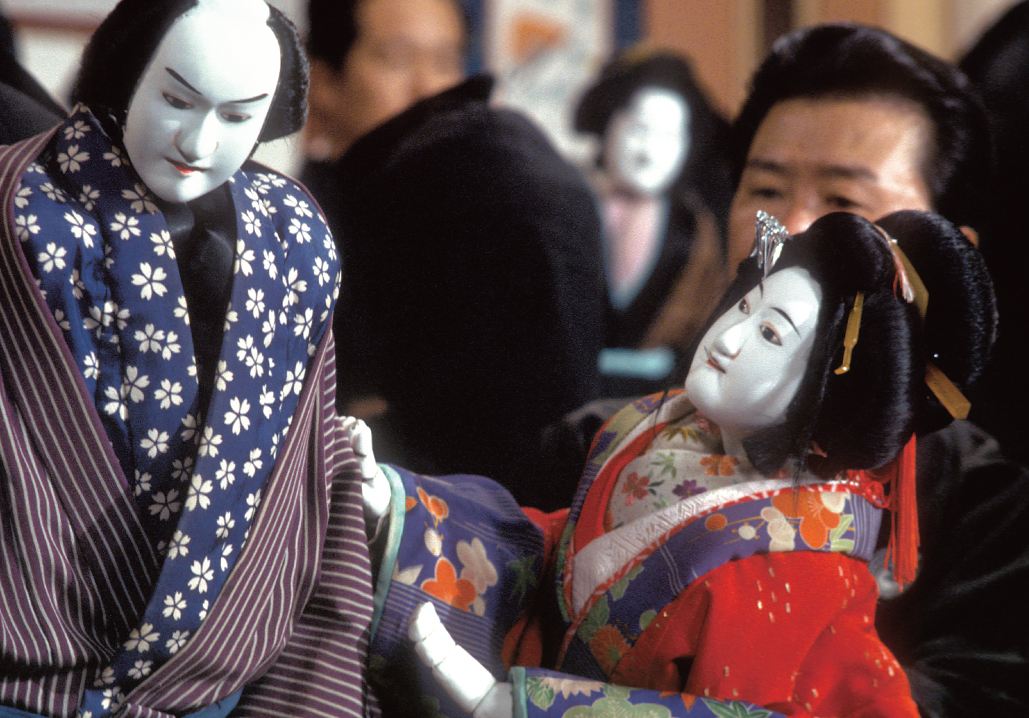
Blu-ray DVD cover to The Lovers' Exile

In 1979, continuing with his interests in Japan and its culture, he filmed The Lovers’ Exile with leading members of the Bunraku Puppet Theatre of Osaka, Japan, at the Daiei Film Studio in Kyoto. This production is the only instance in which the Bunraku art of puppetry, named an "Intangible Cultural Property" by the Japanese government, is captured within its original style – and presented in a feature film. He was praised for showcasing the intricacies of this unique theatre while demonstrating the "poetry and the mechanics of bunraku theatre". Gross overcame obstacles such as the play's length and format, and won the confidence of the Bunraku Theatre of Japan to allow one of its famous works to be compressed into a 90-minute film adaptation. It was released in 1980 to critical acclaim with English subtitles provided by Donald Richie, a former film curator at the Museum of Modern Art and well-known American Japanese film expert. The project was supported by the Canada Council, the Ontario Arts Council, KQED in San Francisco, the Public Broadcasting System of the United States (PBS), the Japan Foundation along with numerous Japanese foundations and corporations. Gross also completed a French subtitled version which was made possible by an Award of Cultural Merit by the French Ministry of Culture. The film was invited to show at international festivals including at the Edinburgh and Venice Film Festivals. Gross followed up with, On Bunraku Theatre with French actor Jean-Louis Barrault which was an introduction to the broadcast of The Lovers’ Exile on PBS in 1981 followed by televised airings in Australia, Hong Kong and Japan.

In the 1980s, he organized and recorded a roundtable discussion with Canadian literary critic, Northrop Frye and noted Canadian editor and journalist, Robert Fulford about The Lovers' Exile. The interview was reproduced in a 2008 publication, Interviews with Northrop Frye by Northrop Frye and Jean O'Grady, published by the University of Toronto, ISBN 978-0802097422, and included in the DVD release of the film.

In 2011, The Lovers' Exile was restored and digitally remastered and presented for one month at the cinema of the Tokyo Metropolitan Museum of Photography. Blu-ray editions of the film have been released in 2012 in North America and in Japan by the Japan Traditional Cultures Foundation. In 2013, a Spanish version of The Lovers' Exile was completed with the assistance of the Japan Foundation and presented in Madrid at Filmoteca Española on September 17, 2013. In 2013, he conducted an extensive interview with Mihoko Okamura former secretary to noted scholar of Zen Buddhism, Daisetsu Teitaro (D.T.) Suzuki. The subject of the interview was D.T. Suzuki, Soetsu Yanagi and Bernard Leach, central figures in the history of Japan’s Folk Craft Movement, known in Japanese as the "mingei" movement. This interview is the first extensive discussion with Mihoko Okamura in English and is part of a project produced by Gross, Documentary Film Compendium of the Japanese Folk Craft (Mingei) Movement.

=== Consulting producer ===
In 1985, Gross began a new trajectory in his career as a consulting producer on Japanese arts for film, television and publishing companies including The Criterion Collection/Janus Films, Perennial Productions, Inc., Marumo Publishing Inc., Rizzoli Publishing (the American branch of RCS Media Group) New York, Tezuka Productions, NHK, Nippon Cine TV Corporation, Icarus Films, the National Film Board of Canada, Oshima Productions, the Japan Foundation, Shochiku Co., Ltd., Stonebridge Press, USA, Bungei Shunju and TBS World News in Japan, Pippin Properties, Studio Pierrot, Kazumo Co., Ltd., the Japan Traditional Cultures Foundation, Only Hearts Co., Ltd. Sound Bank Ltd. The Directors Guild of Japan, Oriental Cine Service Corporation, Young Corporation. He had become known in the Western world for his expertise and intimate knowledge of the language, culture and art history and traditions of Japan. Also in 1985, he began international distribution of Japanese art animation films, on 16mm to schools and libraries. Works by major Japanese animators Osamu Tezuka, Renzo Kinoshita, and Kihachiro Kawamoto were presented for the first time outside Japan. By 1987, he expanded his consulting to include a liaison/producing role on other films and television documentaries for numerous producers working in Japan and Japanese producers working in North America. Gross co-produced a six-part documentary series called, An Investigation into Child Welfare Policy on the social welfare system in Ontario, Canada for Japan’s national broadcaster, NHK University of the Air. He also acquired rights to numerous international documentaries on cultural subjects for release on video in Japan; including ballets, operas and films on the history of art. In 1988–89, Gross was requested by Japanese director, Akira Kurosawa, to locate and acquire film footage for Kurosawa's Dreams, a 1990 magical realism film based on actual dreams of Kurosawa.

In 2005, he acted as editorial consultant to executive producer, Michael Goldberg, on the production of A Zen Life, D. T. Suzuki. Also in 2005, Gross began acting as production consultant for documentaries on the history of Japanese Cinema for the Criterion Collection in the US. He conducted more than 70 interviews with many of the major figures in the history of Japanese Cinema. He currently serves as consulting producer to the Criterion Collection on releases of classic Japanese films. In 2006, he coordinated the publication of Waiting on the Weather by Teruyo Nogami, arranging translation to English, and all fact-checking, text editing and design. The book was published by Stonebridge Press, Berkeley, California, and has been followed by Chinese and Brazilian editions.

=== Film restorer, historian ===
In 1975, Gross earned a Canada Council Travel Award to visit British potter Bernard Leach in St. Ives, Cornwall UK to obtain footage Leach shot during his 1934–35 travels to Japan and Asia. He restored the Leach films with assistance from the Smithsonian Institution, Washington, the National Museum of Man, Ottawa and The Joint Centre on Modern East Asia, Toronto. In addition to the film footage from 1934–35, Janet Darnell Leach gave Gross the original 16mm copy of a film called, The Leach Pottery, 1952. In 2006 Gross began preparations to restore and re-release this film. He contacted American potter Warren MacKenzie suggesting that he record narration for the restored version of the film since MacKenzie had been at The Leach Pottery 1949–1952. Gross finished the film's restoration adding a narrative by MacKenzie about his time with Leach. The DVD version includes footage of Leach shot by MacKenzie in the 2010 released DVD, The Leach Pottery, 1952. In 2011, he discovered that Bernard Leach had made an audio recording to accompany the film, perhaps in the 1960s, so the second edition of The Leach Pottery, 1952 includes the voice-over commentaries of both Leach and MacKenzie. The DVD has been released in both English and Japanese editions. In 1984, he was commissioned by the Japan Foundation, in Tokyo to restore a series of 16mm pre-war films on the arts, crafts and theatre of Japan, originally produced by Kokusai Bunka Shinkokai, (KBS) 1934–39 and completed restoration two years later. Also he restored, Mashiko Village Pottery, Japan 1937 a film of critical importance to the history of crafts, subsequently acquired by major craft organizations worldwide. Mashiko Village Pottery was filmed at the workshop of Totaro Sakuma, where the renowned potter Shoji Hamada studied before establishing his own kiln in Mashiko. In 2007, he completed the 1956 film Gisei featuring Japanese Butoh dancer Tatsumi Hijikata, at the request of director Donald Richie, renowned expert on Japanese film and culture.

Gross is also coordinating and producing the Mingei Film Archive Project, a digitization effort to restore and archive documentary films from 1925 - 1976 of village craftspeople and the origins of the Mingei (Folk Craft) Movement. Gross discovered the films and is also enhancing and adding newly recorded oral histories he has produced of participants, or descendants of those appearing in the films. The archive has over 40 hours of previously unseen footage, and reveals village craftspeople as seen by Leach, Yanagi and Hamada as they developed ideas that changed the direction of hand-craftsmanship worldwide.

In 2021, Gross was appointed an Associate to The Archaeology Centre at the University of Toronto.

For the Mingei Film Archive Project, Gross has currently completed more than 65 films in English and Japanese, with some additional titles in Korean. Films have been presented at Japan House and at the William Morris Gallery in London in 2024.. The Joan B. Mirviss Gallery in New York held an online screening event entitled "MINGEI - Art of the People/Exploring the Mingei Film Archive.”.

In September 2024, Marty Gross made a presentation of films at the Japan Society in London.. Other film screenings have been held at the National Noh Theatre of Japan in Tokyo 2023, 2024 and 2025, at the D.T. Suzuki Museum in Kanazawa, at the Yamaguchi Publishing House in Kyoto and at the Sakurazaka Cinema in Okinawa, 2026.

=== Screenwriter ===
In 1984, Gross was awarded Ontario Arts Council Screenwriter's Grant to complete a contemporary feature screenplay based on the life of the Tichborne Claimant. In 1985, Gross wrote a follow up screenplay, The Implausible Imposter, based on the life of Arthur Orton, the "Tichborne Claimant", after research at the British Library.

In 1986, Gross worked in both Japan and Canada, to research and develop a screenplay for a feature film with Kabuki actor Ennosuke Ichikawa III, resulting in the text for The Secret Magic of Toads. This work is based on several 19th-century ghost stories and heroic adventures, and was slated for filming at Toho Studios in Tokyo, March 1987. The project was not realized due to sudden economic changes in Japan.

== Filmography ==
- The Lovers' Exile. Directed by Marty Gross, Marty Gross Films, Toronto/Japan, 1980. 35mm, colour, 87 minutes, in Japanese with English subtitles. Filmed at the Daiei Studio, Kyoto, Japan.
- Potters At Work. Directed by Marty Gross, Marty Gross Films. 1976, 16mm, colour, 28 minutes. English and French versions. Filmed in Onda, Oita Prefecture, and in Koishibara, Fukuoka Prefecture, Japan.
- As We Are. Directed by Marty Gross, Marty Gross Films. 1974, 16mm, colour, 28 minutes. Filmed at the Tempus Art Centre in Toronto, Canada.
- The Leach Pottery, 1952, and second edition. Restored, edited and produced by Marty Gross, Marty Gross Films. 2007, DVD, black and white, 32 minutes plus supplements. From original materials from Bernard Leach.

== Awards ==
- 2025 Japan Foundation Award
- 2025 TFVA Project Support Awards for the restoration of a critical film, The Textiles of Okinawa, 1940, documenting textile making in Japan.
- 1983 Award of Cultural Merit by French Ministry of Culture, for preparation of a French version of The Lovers' Exile.
- 1977 Best Editing; Canadian Film Awards for Potters At Work
- 1978 "Silver Boomerang;" Melbourne Film Festival, Asolo Prize for Potters At Work
- 1978 Best Visual Treatment of the Life of an Artist, Treviso for Potters At Work
- 1976 Honourable Mention, Interfilm Jury for As We Are
- 1976 Honourable Mention; Childfilm Festival, Canadian Association for Young Children, Vancouver for As We Are
- 1975 Award for Screenplay and Directing, Ministry of Culture, North Rhine-Westfalia, Oberhausen for As We Are
- 1975 Grand Prize, International Film Jury, Oberhausen Film Festival for As We Are
