= Lawrence Hertzog =

American television writer and producer (1951–2008)

- Born: June 25, 1951; Flushing, Queens, New York, U.S.
- Died: April 19, 2008 (aged 56); Los Angeles, California, U.S.
- Occupations: Writer, producer

Lawrence Hertzog (June 25, 1951 – April 19, 2008) was an American television writer and producer. He is best known for creating the cult series Nowhere Man, which aired for one season during 1995–1996 on UPN.

Hertzog was born in Flushing, Queens and grew up in Teaneck, New Jersey.

In addition to continuing work in the entertainment industry, Hertzog also hosted a podcast entitled Drinks with Larry and Lauren in Los Angeles, featuring himself and his former assistant Lauren Proctor.

Hertzog lived in Studio City, California. He died of cancer at Cedars Sinai Hospital in Los Angeles on April 19, 2008.

== Trivia ==
- Hertzog's friend and Nowhere Man producer Joel Surnow named an off-screen CIA official on his series 24 "Larry Hertzog".
