= List of Road to Avonlea episodes =

This is an episode list for Kevin Sullivan's Road to Avonlea. The series began airing on CBC on January 7, 1990, in Canada, and on March 5, 1990 on The Disney Channel in the United States. It ran for seven seasons and ended on March 31, 1996. The final episode total is 91. All seven seasons have been released on DVD.

== Series overview ==
Season	Episodes	Originally released	
Season	Episodes	First released	Last released
1	13	January 7, 1990	May 21, 1990
2	13	December 2, 1990	February 24, 1991
3	13	January 12, 1992	April 5, 1992
4	13	January 17, 1993	April 11, 1993
5	13	January 9, 1994	March 27, 1994
6	13	January 15, 1995	April 2, 1995
7	13	January 14, 1996	March 31, 1996
Special		December 13, 1998	

== Episodes ==
=== Season 1 (1990) ===
No.	Title	Directed by	Written by	Original release date	Prod. code
1	"The Journey Begins"	Paul Shapiro	Patricia Watson	January 7, 1990	101
When Montreal industrialist Blair Stanley is indicted for embezzlement, he sends his 10-year-old daughter Sara to the small town of Avonlea on Prince Edward Island, where she lives with her two aunts, Hetty and Olivia King. Guest Stars: Frances Hyland
2	"The Story Girl Earns Her Name"	Bruce Pittman	Patricia Watson	January 14, 1990	102
Sara and the children of Avonlea public school try to raise money for new books for the school's library. After a traveling swindler runs off with the proceeds, it is up to the children to come up with the funds again. Jasper Dale, the town recluse who is painfully shy, comes to the rescue; Sara gets the donation of a lifetime. Guest Stars: Barbara Gordon, John Gilbert
3	"The Quarantine at Alexander Abraham's"	Don McBrearty	Heather Conkie	January 21, 1990	103
Circumstances throw Rachel Lynde, the most disagreeable woman in Avonlea, and Alexander Abraham, the most disagreeable man in Avonlea, along with Sara and Felix, in close quarters while waiting out a smallpox outbreak. Everyone learns not to take things at face value, and Sara shows everyone about making friends. Guest Stars: W.O. Mitchell
4	"The Materializing of Duncan McTavish"	Don McBrearty	Heather Conkie	January 28, 1990	104
Fans of 'Anne of Green Gables' will remember Marilla getting on Anne's case for her wild imagination. Now the shoe is on Marilla's foot – during a gossip section at the town's Sewing Circle where Sara is trying to learn simple stitches despite the less than helpful remarks from Hetty and Felicity. Marilla makes up a tale which ends up coming true, to her chagrin, for now the gossips will have much more to say about the tarnish on her honest reputation. Guest Stars: Colleen Dewhurst
5	"Old Lady Lloyd"	Bruce Pittman	Fiona McHugh	February 4, 1990	105
The cousins are walking through the woods when Felix throws a rock through the window of the Old Lloyd house. This causes old woman Lloyd to spring out of the door and the cousins to run away, but Sara falls and is caught. Brought into the house, she learns bits and pieces about the old woman. Sylvia Gray comes to visit her old friend Olivia, and while walking through the woods old woman Lloyd hears her name and sees something in Sylvia's face that reminds her of something of her past... but what? And what is up with her brother sneaking into old lady Lloyd's house? Guest Stars: Lloyd Bochner, Rebecca Jenkins, Zoe Caldwell
6	"Proof of the Pudding"	Dick Benner	Suzette Couture	February 11, 1990	106
When Felicity is left in charge of the children, her "know-it-all" attitude provokes instant mayhem. Guest Stars: Paul Haddad, Doris Petrie
7	"Conversions"	Stuart Gillard	Patricia Watson	February 18, 1990	107
When two residents of Avonlea, Peter, who is a Methodist, and Peg Bowen, who is known as the Witch of Avonlea, attend church, the town starts a muttering. The theme of intolerance and teasing is visited, and how people are not always what they seem. When influenza takes a hold on two children, it is outcast Peg who comes to the rescue. Guest Stars: Fiona Reid, Barbara Gordon
8	"Aunt Abigail's Beau"	F. Harvey Frost	Heather Conkie	February 25, 1990	108
Instead of taking care of a husband, Janet's spinster sister, Abigail Ward, has funneled her energies into being a meticulous homemaker despite not really enjoying it. Things may change when into her life returns Malcolm McEwan, an old beau who has been away from Avonlea for seven years. He has returned to make good on a promise: Abigail's father would not allow the two to marry until Malcolm made a fortune, which he has now done in Yukon gold. He now wants to marry Abby as he calls her. Abby is in a quandary. She likes having the attention of a man, but realizes that she and Malcolm are extremes in personality (he loud and brash, she overly meticulous). But mostly, she fears two things: that she will lose her independence, and if she truly does fall in love with him all over again that he may run off much like he did seven years ago. Malcolm's return not only affects Abby, but also Alec, who is feeling restless about the choices he has made in life. Guest Stars: Malcolm Stoddard, Rosemary Dunsmore
9	"Malcolm and the Baby"	F. Harvey Frost	Heather Conkie	March 4, 1990	109
A former student teacher of Hetty's and her husband die leaving no will, but plenty of property and a small baby. Hetty and Rachael Lynde battle over who will care for the child, but Sara and Felicity have a better idea: they have found the perfect couple to be the child's parents. However the law has other ideas. Guest Stars: Malcolm Stoddard, Rosemary Dunsmore
10	"Felicity's Challenge"	Bruce Pittman	Lori Fleming	April 2, 1990	110
Judson Parker is passing through Avonlea. A candidate for the provincial election being held the following week, he is trying to buy his way to win. Some of the Avonlea voters see through his tricks, but others fall for his manipulation. Meanwhile, it is Harvest Festival time, and the children in particular are looking forward to the party. Felicity is sure she will win best costume as she does every year. Clemmie, who does like harvest time, doesn't seem to allow herself to enjoy the party due to her shyness. Sally and Jane have been talking negatively about Clemmie behind her back to Felicity and Sara, Felicity who doesn't stand up for her friend just to stay in Sally and Jane's good books. Thinking she is doing Clemmie a favor, Felicity takes up a bet from Sally about transforming Clemmie into the belle of the party. Despite Sara's vows that Felicity's plan will ultimately end up hurting Clemmie, Felicity goes ahead with her transformation without letting Clemmie know its real purpose. Guest Stars: Dan MacDonald, Wayne Robson
11	"The Witch of Avonlea"	Rene Bonniere	Suzette Couture	May 7, 1990	111
Felix is caught in a violent snowstorm and forced to take refuge in a cottage belonging to Avonlea’s witch.
12	"The Blue Chest of Arabella King"	Don McBrearty	Heather Conkie	May 14, 1990	112
The King's Aunt Arabella has just died. For fifty years in the King's attic sat her blue chest, which she asked to be opened only after her death. She left it there when she left Avonlea for good shortly after her fiancé committed suicide the day before their planned wedding. There is great anticipation amongst the family of treasures in the chest, but they find primarily moth eaten wedding mementos. Sara is certain that there is more – why would Arabella forbid the chest to be opened otherwise – and she indeed does find something hidden in the chest, something that most would not consider a treasure except someone like romantic Sara. Meanwhile, Olivia, who has been badmouthed by Hetty for frittering away her life, applies for a job writing for the Avonlea District Chronicle newspaper. The newspaper is in financial straits, but Mr. Tyler, the newspaper's owner, hires her on a trial basis on the condition that she make good on her promise to find exciting local stories and find an in-kind photographer to take photographs to accompany her stories, photographs missing from the newspaper in its current version. Sara can see the interest that Jasper Dale is showing in Olivia and is certain he will do Olivia the favor of being her photographer despite his shyness. Indeed, he does agree. Jasper thinks that Sara's find in the blue chest is newsworthy, but Olivia and Sara will have to do some more investigative work to uncover the full story. Mr. Tyler, however, seems to have a problem with this specific story, the reason he is reluctant to divulge. Guest Stars: Ron White
13	"Nothing Endures But Change"	Stuart Gillard	Heather Conkie	May 21, 1990	113
Blair Stanley makes an unexpected visit to Avonlea. He brings good news: the trial has concluded, and he has been acquitted. However, the business has to be rebuilt so he has much work to do. His plan is to take Sara back to Montréal tomorrow morning, his haste due to his strained relationship with Hetty. Upon meeting again, time has not healed any wounds between the two. Sara is happy to see her papa, but is saddened to leave Avonlea, especially that she will be missing the skating festival. But what's worse is that if she and Blair leave, with Blair still on strained terms with Hetty, Sara will never return to Avonlea and never see her King relations ever again. Sara decides that she should have some say into what happens to her own life. Meanwhile, a bond seems to be forming between Olivia and Jasper beyond their professional collaboration at the newspaper. Hetty is afraid that she will lose both Olivia and Sara in one fell swoop. Also, Olivia is mad at Hetty, and because this whole thing is scarring Sara, she and Hetty start fighting constantly. Sara devises a plan to stop all this, and runs away later that night. Felicity and Felix hide her in their barn, but they are caught getting food for Sara. When everyone goes to get Sara, she says that she will not come until everyone gets along. She then attempts to leave out the back door of the barn, but falls and is unconscious. While Sara is in her bed at Rose cottage with Blair watching after her, Olivia cries in Jasper's arms. After Jasper leaves, Hetty breaks a tea cup, and begins to cry about losing Sara and Olivia. Olivia tells Hetty that she won't lose her or Sara, and they make up. The next day, Blair, Hetty, Olivia, and Sara, who has a broken leg, go ice skating. Sara gets to stay in Avonlea, but gets to come home when she wants. Jasper and Olivia ice skate together. As Hetty watches Jasper and Olivia, she is still very worried that she is losing her baby sister. Guest Star: Robert Collins

=== Season 2 (1990–91) ===
No.	Title	Directed by	Written by	Original release date	Prod. code
14	"Sara's Homecoming"	Rene Bonniere	Heather Conkie	December 2, 1990	201
Sara returns to Montreal to live with her father, but tragedy causes her return to the island. Once only motherless, Sara finds herself suddenly orphaned and searching for answers. A traveling circus is in Avonlea and Peter takes her, hoping to cheer her up. Instead, Sara decides to visit the fortune teller, who claims to communicate with the deceased. Sara's life is placed in danger and it is Uncle Alec who saves the day. Guest Stars: Elizabeth Shepherd, Frances Hyland, Robert Collins
15	"How Kissing Was Discovered"	Rene Bonniere	Suzette Couture	December 9, 1990	202
Janet King's Great-Aunt Eliza comes for a visit and sets the King household on its ear, as Janet tries to please her guest while she herself is feeling quite unwell. Alec finds out that playing cricket is not as easy as it used to be when he was a younger man. Felicity decides that she is now "grown up" at age 13 and develops a crush on a visiting rival cricket player. Mooning over David Hawes, Felicity longs to receive her "first kiss". Sara and Felix make a new friend, Gus Pike, a young sailor, recently arrived in Avonlea and looking for work. Alec offers his barn for Gus to stay in, and also some work until the cannery begins hiring. It is wise Great Aunt Eliza who realizes why Janet is feeling unwell; it is announced that the family will soon have a new baby. Felicity finally gets her kiss and the family is never the same after Gus Pike enters their lives. Guest Stars: Kay Tremblay
16	"Aunt Hetty's Ordeal"	Stuart Gillard	Marlene Matthews	December 16, 1990	203
Muriel Stacey is returning home to Avonlea to see her old school house and her school chum Hetty King. Feeling threatened by her perceived former rival, Hetty goes out looking for new students. Gus Pike is now working at the cannery, and wants to learn reading, writing and how to be a gentleman. Hetty is delighted with his enthusiasm. After an accident at home, Hetty is temporarily replaced at school by Muriel, who not only does not want to replace Hetty, but organizes the children to do a "tribute" to her. Gus plays a fiddle solo to express his gratitude to Hetty. Guest Stars: Marilyn Lightstone
17	"Of Corsets and Secrets and True, True Love"	Rene Bonniere	Marlene Matthews	December 23, 1990	204
Dora and Davey Keith come to live at Green Gables, with Marilla, a distant relative, after their parents die. Only a temporary arrangement until an uncle can be located, Marilla is faced with the prospect of turning two children over to an orphanage or losing the friendship of Rachel Lynde, because Davey has proven to be a handful. Rachel makes matters worse because she is suffering from a toothache, but refuses to go to the doctor...and then there is that naughty pig. Guest Stars: Colleen Dewhurst
18	"Old Quarrels, Old Love"	Allan King	Heather Conkie	December 30, 1990	205
Hetty King runs into her old beau, Romney Penhallow, at a wedding and refuses to speak to him, because of an age-old quarrel between the two. Romney pursues Hetty and makes her speak to him and they enjoy some quiet time together. Romney has a sad secret, which is finally shared with Hetty. Their friendship becomes more important to both of them, and they are able to make peace with each other. Also, because of Romney, Hetty and Rachel Lynde are finally able to bury the hatchet and become friends once again. Guest Stars: Peter Coyote, Leon Pownall, Patricia Gage, Ron White
19	"May the Best Man Win"	Rene Bonniere	Heather Conkie	January 6, 1991	206
Edwin Clark, an old beau of Olivia's, has returned to Avonlea, intent on winning her hand. Hetty had chased him off years before, but as he returns wealthy and successful, Hetty no longer objects. Sara thinks Olivia is better suited to shy and awkward Jasper Dale, and encourages him to pay court to her. Olivia is torn between a former love and a new love, however her decision on who would be the best man to wed becomes quite clear when she sees how the two men react to the emergency that occurs when a small boy falls down an abandoned well. Guest Stars: Joseph Bottoms, Susan E. Cox
20	"Family Rivalry"	F. Harvey Frost	Jerome McCann	January 13, 1991	207
Andrew King's father, Roger, returns from the jungles of Brazil and a doting Hetty heaps praise on him. She even plans a reception in his honour at King Farm and placing Janet in charge. Alec, the elder brother and heir to the family farm, is put in a bad light when he loans money from the family trust to a neighbor in need. This not only puts a strain on Alec and Roger's relationship, but their sons Felix and Andrew are also affected, as they argue over Grandfather King's fishing basket. Fists fly, lessons are learned and fences are mended between the siblings. Guest Stars: Andrew Gillies, Wayne Robson
21	"Sea Ghost"	Allan King	Janet Maclean	January 20, 1991	208
Gus Pike is working hard at school and taking odd jobs around town when Captain Ezekiel Crane, the reclusive lighthouse keeper, offers him a job and a place to stay. Rachel Lynde is convinced that the island is being overrun by bootleggers. The children believe they see a Ghost Ship near the lighthouse. Abe Pike, former first mate for Captain Crane, arrives in Avonlea, having escaped from prison and claims Gus as his son. Abe fights with Ezekiel and falls into the ocean, as the townspeople storm the lighthouse looking for bootleggers. Guest Stars: Michael York, Don Francks
22	"All That Glitters"	F. Harvey Frost	Janet Maclean	January 27, 1991	209
Sara finds an old gold coin while helping Gus and Captain Crane gather firewood. Captain Crane informs her that the island is a burial ground of pirates' treasure and that her coin very likely came from a treasure. Rachel Lynde, Janet King and Aunt Hetty all go looking in different places for treasure. Gus, Sara and Felicity are put in danger when Captain Borden, a former shipmate and friend of Captain Crane's, arrives in Avonlea. Borden believes that Ezekiel has knowledge of the location of a lost Spanish treasure. Captain Crane leaves Avonlea after tricking Borden and giving Gus the lighthouse as a home, and a ruby and gold ring. Guest Stars: Michael York, Tom Butler
23	"Dreamer of Dreams"	Allan King	Heather Conkie	February 3, 1991	210
Bored with everyday life, the King cousins decide to create their own newspaper. This helps to keep them entertained and goes quite well, until the children's "made up" advice column (Madame X) gets mixed up with the Avonlea Chronicles' real news. Olivia, working as a reporter for the Chronicle, and temporarily acting as editor, is hard put to defend herself for the column mix-up. Then the Chronicle office is robbed and it is up to Jasper Dale to catch the thief and exonerate Olivia.
24	"It's Just a Stage"	Rene Bonniere	Marlene Matthews	February 10, 1991	211
Pigeon Plumtree is a famous actress and Sara's cousin, who has decided to make a stop in Avonlea. Sara has stars in her eyes when Pigeon claims that she has the makings of a great actress. Pat Frewen, resident pig farmer, is enchanted by Pigeon, much to the distress of Theodora, who has waited 20 years for Pat to propose to her. Sara sorts out this odd love triangle and decides to stay in Avonlea. Guest Stars: Madeline Kahn, Kate Lynch
25	"A Mother's Love"	Don McBrearty	Suzette Couture	February 17, 1991	212
"Rollings Reliable" is sponsoring an essay contest to honour the mothers of the town. When Sara decides that Aunt Hetty should be her subject for the contest a scornful Sally Potts and Felicity tell her only a "real" mother could be entered in the contest. Having found out that Sally and Felicity share a birth date, and were delivered by the same doctor, a mischievous Sara tells them they were switched at birth. Both girls and their mothers agonize over this and learn that it is "who raises the child, and not who gives birth" that makes a woman a mother. Felicity enters Sara's discarded essay in the competition and Hetty wins.
26	"Misfits and Miracles"	F. Harvey Frost	Heather Conkie	February 24, 1991	213
Archie Gillis challenges Alec King by refusing many who want to play ice hockey a place on the Avonlea team. Alec starts a team of his own with the 'misfits' that Archie refused. With the help of Miss Stacy and Peg Bowen, after Alec sprains his back and can't play, the 'Misfits' show Archie Gillis and his 'Avengers' a thing or two. Back at King Farm, Janet is in need of help when the baby arrives sooner than expected, and Sara is there to help after the capable Felicity passes out. Guest Stars: Marilyn Lightstone

=== Season 3 (1992) ===
No.	Title	Directed by	Written by	Original release date	Prod. code
27	"The Ties That Bind"	F. Harvey Frost	Heather Conkie	January 12, 1992	301
Olivia King and Jasper Dale are only a week away from their wedding day when Hetty King decides to take over. Her heavy-handed methods, which include ordering a dress all the way from Paris, soon alienate the entire family and put the wedding in danger. Meanwhile Janet's Great Aunt Eliza comes to attend the wedding.
28	"Felix and Blackie"	Allan King	Heather Conkie	January 19, 1992	302
When the King family purchases a new horse, Felix King convinces Alec King to let him take over care of their elderly horse, Blackie. In order to afford Blackie's care, Felix starts a delivery service, which Alec hopes will help Felix learn life lessons. Sarah Stanley and Cecily King soon join the business venture after they see the profit Felix is making. Unfortunately, things very quickly start to go wrong for Felix, ending in tragedy.
29	"Another Point of View"	Allan King	Charles Lazer	January 26, 1992	303
When Hetty King pushes her students ahead of an academic contest, their parents complaints push Hetty into resigning. A recently out of work actor, Mr Dimple (Christopher Lloyd), cons his way into the open position. Guest Stars: Christopher Lloyd
30	"But When She Was Bad... She Was Horrid: Part 1"	Don McBrearty	Marlene Matthews	February 2, 1992	304
Sarah Stanley and her Aunt, Hetty King, argue over a dress which Hetty donates to the church poor box. When trying to get the dress back, Sarah and Felix King meet Jo Pitts, a young homeless girl who looks exactly like Sarah. The two decide to switch places in order for Sarah to escape Hetty for a few days. (The occurrences of this two-part episode must take place earlier than those in "Felix and Blackie.") Guest Stars: Don Francks
31	"But When She Was Bad... She Was Horrid: Part 2"	Don McBrearty	Marlene Matthews	February 9, 1992	305
Having traded places with Jo Pitts, a young runaway who looks exactly like her, Sarah Stanley has caught a boat to the mainland with Gus Pike. Sarah is mistaken for Jo, a member of a pickpocket gang. Gus thought he was meeting up with Captain Crane, but is instead kidnapped by his father. Meanwhile, Jo is creating havoc with the King family, who believe her to be Sarah. Guest Stars: Don Francks
32	"Aunt Janet Rebels"	F. Harvey Frost	Janet Maclean	February 16, 1992	306
Inspired by a suffragette, Janet is trying to collect 50 signatures in support of voting rights for women. She becomes involved in a strike at the cannery over women's wages. Meanwhile, the King household is disrupted by her activities. Guest Stars: Fiona Reid, Chris Wiggins, Lucy Peacock
33	"A Dark and Stormy Night"	Allan King	Hart Hanson	February 23, 1992	307
Gus Pike becomes involved with a mysterious woman claiming to be running for her life and to protect her fortune. Guest Stars: Christopher Reeve, Louise Vallance, John Neville
34	"Friends and Relations"	Stephen Surjik	Heather Conkie	March 1, 1992	308
Alec and Felix King go ice fishing with Jasper Dale and Gus Pike. Alec and Jasper reminisce about their childhood while Felix and Gus ask for romantic advice. Meanwhile, Janet and Hetty King, Olivia Dale and Abigail McEwan go to an auction where tempers flare. Guest Stars: Rosemary Dunsmore
35	"Vows of Silence"	Gilbert Shilton	Hart Hanson	March 8, 1992	309
Janet receives a precious comb from Alec, Olivia, and Hetty that has been in the King family for generations. Felicity ends up losing the comb and never tells Janet. A huge family argument erupts and the King Cousins fear the world might end before amends are made. Guest Stars: Keith Knight
36	"After the Honeymoon"	Don McBrearty	Janet Maclean	March 15, 1992	310
A female scientist arrives in Avonlea to help Jasper Dale with experiments on bats. Soon he is spending more time with her than with Olivia. The townspeople can't help but talk, while Sara and Felix investigate whether or not Jasper is a vampire. Guest Stars: Kate Nelligan
37	"High Society"	George Bloomfield	Janet Maclean	March 22, 1992	311
Felicity is rewarded with a trip to Kingsport Ladies' College for receiving some of the highest marks on the Island. Upon arriving at the school, Felicity begins to tell more lies than she can count. Guest Stars: Shirley Douglas, Albert Millaire
38	"The Calamitous Courting of Hetty King"	Stuart Gillard	Marlene Matthews	March 29, 1992	312
A traveling salesman, who sells ice skates, comes to Avonlea and soon earns the love of many of the people with his jokes and laughter. But soon things get out of hand when he starts to pursues Hetty King with one thing in mind: Marriage. Guest Stars: Ned Beatty, John Gilbert
39	"Old Friends, Old Wounds"	George Bloomfield	Heather Conkie	April 5, 1992	313
Davy Keith has been misbehaving. After he breaks Dora's doll, he gets picked on at school. He runs home, and apologizes to Marilla. After going to Lawson's General store with Rachel Lynde, Davy finds Marilla unconscious. Marilla dies in her bedroom, with Rachel Lynde and Hetty King by her side. After Marilla's funeral, Gilbert Blythe arrives to comfort Rachel, and explains that Anne couldn't come because she has Scarlet Fever. They find out that Green Gables is being foreclosed. What will they do? Guest Stars: Jonathan Crombie, Bruce Boa

=== Season 4 (1993) ===
No.	Title	Directed by	Written by	Original release date	Prod. code
40	"Tug of War"	Don McBrearty	Leila Basen	January 17, 1993	401
Olivia and Jasper are expecting their first baby! But before the baby arrives, Jasper's eccentric family comes to Avonlea for a family reunion. Before long, a family feud starts to brew between the Kings and the Dales.
41	"Lady and the Blade"	Otta Hanus	Deborah Nathan	January 17, 1993	402
Hetty is taking a break from teaching to help Olivia with her baby. Meanwhile, the school board has a difficult time finding a suitable teacher to fill Hetty's shoes. They finally hire a former military school teacher who causes more than a few problems with his stern ways. Guest Stars: David Fox
42	"Incident at Vernon River"	F. Harvey Frost	Rich Drew	January 24, 1993	403
Felix's birthday arrives and his only wish is to receive a rifle. When he doesn't, he steals one of Alec's which results in a heart wrenching incident. Guest Stars: David Fox, Zachary Ansley
43	"Evelyn"	Don McBrearty	Robert Adetuyi	January 31, 1993	404
When a fire almost burns down the blacksmith shop, the people of Avonlea decided to start a volunteer fire department. Although this is a wonderful idea, trouble arises between Alec and Mr. Pettibone. Guest Stars: David Fox
44	"Moving On"	Stephen Surjik	Charles Lazer	February 7, 1993	405
A traveling Wild West show arrives in Avonlea, with a very handsome, yet older, Marshal Zach Morgan. Sara soon develops a crush on him and Hetty is at a loss as to what to do. Guest Stars: Treat Williams, August Schellenberg
45	"Boys Will Be Boys"	Graeme Campbell	Raymond Storey	February 14, 1993	406
A boyhood friend of Alec's returns to Avonlea in the hopes of building a life for his wife and baby daughter. When a tragic accident takes his friend's life, but spares his, Alec does his best to help the young widow which sends the tongues of the gossips wagging. Guest Stars: Meg Tilly, Peter MacNeill
46	"The Dinner"	Robert Boyd	Heather Conkie	February 21, 1993	407
Felicity cooks up a plan to get everyone out of the house so she can spend some time alone with Gus Pike. Unfortunately, things don't turn out as she had planned. Guest Stars: David Fox
47	"Heirs and Graces"	Don McBrearty	Hart Hanson	February 28, 1993	408
The Duke of Arranagh is visiting P.E.I and Hetty is determined to have him at the Founders Day banquet at the White Sands, the new working place of Felix King. But the manager of the hotel refuses to send the Duke an invitation and no one knows why. Guest Stars: Ian Clark, Albert Millaire
48	"Hearts and Flowers"	Stephen Surjik	Hart Hanson	March 7, 1993	409
The Valentine's Day dance is approaching, and Felicity is stuck in between the affections of two boys; Gus Pike and Arthur Pettibone. Chef Pierre's niece also arrives in town, who takes an interest in Gus. Guest Stars: Ian Clark, Zachary Ansley, David Fox
49	"Felicity's Perfect Beau"	Don McBrearty	Therese Beaupre	March 21, 1993	410
The rivalry between Gus Pike and Arthur Pettibone for Felicity becomes serious. Felicity has to make a choice between the two and stop playing with their affections. Guest Stars: David Fox, Zachary Ansley
50	"The Disappearance"	F. Harvey Frost	Deborah Nathan	March 28, 1993	411
A mysterious antique dealer comes to Avonlea but there is much more to him than meets the eye. Guest Stars: Diana Rigg, Robby Benson
51	"Home Movie"	Don McBrearty	Marlene Matthews	April 4, 1993	412
A wealthy businessman comes to Avonlea in the hopes of buying up all the land to build a town with all the modern conveniences of the 20th century. It is up to Hetty King and Jasper Dale and a picture camera to change the minds of the people of Avonlea. Guest Stars: Michael Hogan, Bruce Boa
52	"Hearth and Home"	Otta Hanus	Deborah Nathan	April 11, 1993	413
Great Aunt Eliza comes back for a visit and causes quite a stir. Meanwhile, the Kings are trying to fight the winter cold to save their new born lambs. Guest Stars: David Fox, Kay Tremblay

=== Season 5 (1994) ===
No.	Title	Directed by	Written by	Original release date	Prod. code
53	"Fathers and Sons"	Otta Hanus	Heather Conkie	January 9, 1994	501
Felix dreams of one day owning his own tea room, right on the coast to earn loads of money. Alec is less than enthusiastic about this, as he plans to leave the farm to Felix. This causes lots of tension between Felix and Alec. Guest Stars: Paul Soles, Kay Tremblay
54	"Memento Mori"	Don McBrearty	Heather Conkie	January 9, 1994	502
Hetty's contract with her publishers is terminated on the day of her birthday. She begins to feel regret that she didn't travel and see the world. But a serious health problem changes her perspective. Guest Stars: Marilyn Lightstone, Kay Tremblay
55	"Modern Times"	F. Harvey Frost	Charles Lazer	January 16, 1994	503
Hetty buys the cannery when the owner announced he planned to open a distillery. Not knowing how to run a cannery, she puts Jasper and Olivia in charge. The two use modern methods to make the cannery more efficient and almost lose their house in the process! Guest Stars: Ray Jewers, Heath Lamberts
56	"A Friend in Need"	Allan Kroaker	Marlene Matthews	January 23, 1994	504
Rachel Lynde leaves Avonlea to visit her son, Billy. Felix starts a rumor that Billy is in jail. Soon the story gets around town and keeps getting bigger and bigger. Meanwhile, Izzy Pettibone starts to take an interest in dresses for the first time. Guest Stars: Marilyn Lightstone, David Fox
57	"Strictly Melodrama"	Allan Kroeker	Yan Moore	January 30, 1994	505
Every year Hetty is the director of a play for a drama competition against neighboring communities. For the first time, Janet is cast as the leading lady. When a famous actress comes to Avonlea, Hetty replaces Janet and things start to go downhill from there. Guest Stars: Linda Sorenson, Kay Tremblay, Marilyn Lightstone
58	"The Great Race"	Stefan Scaini	Rick Drew	February 6, 1994	506
Alec enters Felix into a steeple chase competition and Felix is ready to prove he can handle a man’s race. But after falling off his horse, he starts to develop a fear of riding. Guest Stars: David Fox, Zachary Ansley
59	"Stranger in the Night"	Allan King	Janet Maclean	February 13, 1994	507
A stranger arrives on the King farm and Alec hires him on to help bring in the hay. But soon the Kings begin to question his background when things don't add up. Guest Stars: Marilyn Lightstone, Bruce Greenwood
60	"Someone to Believe In"	Eleanor Lindo	Avrum Jacobson	February 20, 1994	508
John Hodgson is a member of Parliament and is running for Prime Minister. He arrives on Prince Edward Island with his young, beautiful daughter and Alec is in charge of his stay. Felix starts to grow very fond of Mr. Hodgson's daughter. When items start going missing from the hotel, Felix decides to get to the bottom of it. Guest Stars: Gordon Pinsent, Albert Millaire, Laura Bertram
61	"Thursday's Child"	F. Harvey Frost	Heather Conkie	February 27, 1994	509
Cecily is diagnosed with tuberculosis and Janet feels responsible. Felicity starts to learn more about the disease and the need for Cecily to be sent away to a sanatorium but Janet refuses to even think of sending her away. Guest Stars: Marilyn Lightstone, Kay Tremblay Note: Last episode in which Harmony Cramp portrays Cecily King.
62	"Best Laid Plans"	Eleanor Lindo	Deborah Nathan	March 6, 1994	510
Jasper Dale's latest invention is dinner wear that does not break. Olivia believes that they need to patent it as soon as possible and seeks the advice of Jasper's cousin, Jeremiah Dale. Jeremiah is the black sheep of the Dale family and Jasper has little respect or trust for his cousin. Meanwhile, Davy Keith is trying to do three good deeds and saves the day when Jeremiah's true colors finally show through. Guest Stars: Ian D. Clark, Benedict Campbell
63	"Otherwise Engaged"	Allan King	Heather Conkie	March 13, 1994	511
Gus Pike gets promoted to assistant manager of the White Sands hotel. Meanwhile, Felicity gets accepted into medical school and when Gus asks Felicity to marry him, the answer is not what he expected. As a result, Gus starts to long for life on the sea. Guest Stars: Marilyn Lightstone, David Fox
64	"Enter Prince Charming"	Stephen Surjik	Raymond Storey	March 20, 1994	512
A new minister arrives in town with his wife and son, Booth. The family is welcomed, but their lively and enthusiastic ways are a little too much for the simple folk of Avonlea. And Sara Stanley becomes very close with Booth. Guest Stars: Stockard Channing, David Fox, Jaimz Woolvett, Marilyn Lightstone
65	"The Minister's Wife"	Allan King	Raymond Storey	March 27, 1994	513
Janet King makes friends with Viola, the minister's wife. When Janet and Viola are in an unfortunate accident involving a motor car, Janet starts to wonder about Viola's personal life. Guest Stars: Stockard Channing, David Fox, Jaimz Woolvett, Marilyn Lightstone Note Final appearance of Sarah Polley as a series regular; she would make a guest appearance in Season six and in the series finale.

=== Season 6 (1995) ===
No.	Title	Directed by	Written by	Original release date	Prod. code
66	"The Return of Gus Pike"	Stephen Surjik	Marlene Matthews	January 15, 1995	601
While in Halifax for medical school, Felicity runs into Gus Pike who had been away at sea. They find a woman selling flowers who might have a connection with Gus' past. Guest Stars: Janet-Laine Green, Terri Hawkes
67	"Lonely Hearts"	Graeme Lynch	Marlene Matthews	January 15, 1995	602
Love is in the air! The people of Avonlea are organizing a Bachelor auction to raise money for a hospital, creating many feelings between the different town folks. Guest Stars: Marilyn Lightstone, David Fox
68	"Christmas in June"	William Brayne	Avrum Jacobson	January 22, 1995	603
Cecily is away at a sanitarium in New York State and is lonely and bored. When a new, exciting boy arrives, Cecily ends up in more than one mess! Guest Stars: Shane Meier Note: Molly Atkinson takes over the role of Cecily King beginning with this episode.
69	"Fools and Kings"	William Brayne	Raymond Storey	January 29, 1995	604
Alec finally realizes Felix is a man and starts the process of getting him in the very secret club called The Knights Of P.E.I. Meanwhile, Janet, lonely for children to look after, responds to an advertisement in a magazine to make money. But instead of making money, she owes money! Guest Stars: Leon Pownall, Marilyn Lightstone
70	"Comings and Goings"	Eleanor Lindo	Deborah Nathan	February 5, 1995	605
Sara Stanley is back in Avonlea with her Nanny Louisa. She is stuck between Hetty, who wants to take her on a tour of Canada, and Louisa, who wants to take her across Europe. But Sara has ideas of her own. Guest Stars: Sarah Polley, Frances Hyland, Albert Millaire, Zachary Ansley, Kay Tremblay
71	"The Trouble with Davey"	Stacey Stewart Curtis	Raymond Storey	February 12, 1995	606
Rachel Lynde suffers a stroke and has to leave Avonlea to live with her son, Robert. While she is gone, Hetty takes in Davey and Dora. Davey takes Rachel's sickness hard and Hetty begins to worry about him.
72	"Great Expectations"	Charles Wilkinson	Laurie Pearson	February 19, 1995	607
Davey has gotten into more trouble, copying Dora's homework. Hetty decides to get Davey a hard job so he'll want to go back to school. But when Davey starts to work at the cannery, instead of Jasper giving him a hard job, Jasper takes Davey under his wing and encourages a love for learning. Guest Stars:David Fox
73	"A Fox Tale"	Kit Hood	Laurie Pearson	February 26, 1995	608
Felix, against the wishes of his family, starts a fox farm. But when he recruits Nat Lester as his business partner, Felix soon realizes Nat more interested in money than in working. Guest Stars: Kevin Jubinville, Kay Tremblay
74	"The More Things Change"	Allan Eastman	Rick Drew	March 5, 1995	609
When Muriel Stacey accepts Clive Pettibone's proposal of marriage, Izzy Pettibone starts to regret ever getting them together in the first place. Guest Stars: David Fox, Zachary Ansley, Marilyn Lightstone
75	"Home Is Where the Heart Is"	Stacey Stewart Curtis	Avrum Jacobson	April 6, 1995	610
Rachel Lynde, while on her way home, has another stroke. Hetty decides to take her in. Hetty and the children work on restoring Rachel's health so she doesn't have to leave again. Guest Stars: Albert Millaire
76	"What a Tangled Web We Weave"	F. Harvey Frost	Marlene Matthews	March 19, 1995	611
A big wedding is being held at the White Sands. The groom is the son of a Polish countess and the bride is Chef Pierre's sister! Pierre is in a tangle when his mother also arrives, who believes Pierre owns the hotel. Guest Stars: Faye Dunaway, Maureen Stapleton, Albert Millaire, Peter Outerbridge
77	"A Time to Every Purpose"	Stefan Scaini	Laurie Pearson	March 26, 1995	612
Felicity loses her spot for medical school and when Dr. Snow offers her a job, she accepts. She starts to doubt becoming a doctor after a tragic incident. Guest Stars: Marilyn Lightstone, Graham McPherson, Marion Bennett
78	"Homecoming"	Allan King	Janet Maclean and Raymond Storey	April 2, 1995	613
Cecily is finally healthy again is brought home from the sanitarium. But readjusting to life to Avonlea is harder than she expected when everyone, including her parents, believes she is still unwell. Felicity learns some tragic news about Gus Pike. Guest Stars: Marilyn Lightstone

=== Season 7 (1996) ===
No.	Title	Directed by	Written by	Original release date	Prod. code
79	"Out of the Ashes"	Stefan Scaini	Marlene Matthews	January 14, 1996	701
A year after receiving the news about Gus' death, Felicity is still mourning. With the help of the new banker, Stuart McRae, and four orphans, Felicity manages to come back to the land of the living. Guest Stars: Gema Zamprogna, David Ferry, Marilyn Lightstone
80	"Love May Be Blind... But the Neighbours Ain't"	Allan King	Raymond Storey	January 14, 1996	702
After a canoe ride with Izzy Pettibone, Felix, unwillingly, leads Donny Lester to believe something that wasn't true. Donny soon spreads a story around town and Izzy's honor is hurt. She then refuses to speak to Felix. Guest Stars: Gema Zamprogna, R.H. Thomson, David Ferry, Marilyn Lightstone
81	"Davey and the Mermaid"	Allan King	Jeremy Hole	January 21, 1996	703
Simon Tremayne hires a travelling Midway to be a part of the Avonlea Fair. One of the attractions is a mermaid. Davey Keith is fascinated with the mermaid and it is this fascination that saves the town's money! Guest Stars: David Hemblen
82	"Woman of Importance"	Allan King	Janet Maclean	January 28, 1996	704
Morgan Pettibone is expelled from military school which sends Clive through the roof. Izzy, wanting to smooth things over, invites her late-mother's sister, Lillian. Aunt Lillian paints a beautiful, yet unrealistic, picture of life in Boston. So beautiful, in fact, that Izzy wants to go stay with her. But Izzy doesn't know that Aunt Lillian is in a dire financial situation. Guest Stars: Dianne Wiest, Zachary Ansley, Marilyn Lightstone, David Fox
83	"Secrets and Sacrifices"	William Brayne	Laurie Pearson	February 4, 1996	705
Janet's sister, Abigail is back in Avonlea! Janet and Abigail agree that from now on, they will be the best of friends. But like before, it isn't long before tempers start to flare. Guest Stars: Karl Pruner, Rosemary Dunsmore, Kay Tremblay
84	"Ah... Sweet Mystery of Life"	Stacey Stewart Curtis	Marlene Matthews	February 11, 1996	706
Simon Tremayne proposes marriage to Hetty and she accepts! But Simon's love for the hotel and Hetty's love for the school might put an end to their engagement. Guest Stars: David Fox, Marilyn Lightstone
85	"King of the Great White Way"	F. Harvey Frost	Hart Hanson	February 18, 1996	707
Rudy and Betty Blaine are Broadway writers and composers and are visiting the Island. After hearing Alec's singing voice, they offer him a job singing for their musicals on Broadway! Guest Stars: Sheila McCarthy, Eugene Levy
86	"Total Eclipse"	William Brayne	Heather Conkie	February 25, 1996	708
Tourists are coming to the Island from everywhere to witness the Eclipse. Felix, wanting to gain experience in the hotel so Mr. Tremayne will promote him, overbooks the hotel and takes the extra guests back to the King farm, now known as "The King Farm Boarding House". Things backfire real fast! Guest Star:Frank Pellegrino
87	"From Away"	Stefan Scaini	Laurie Pearson	March 3, 1996	709
Felicity finds two English orphans on the streets of Charlottetown and sends them back to Avonlea to stay at the Foundling Home. Hetty wants Davey to befriend the two, Brett and Ian, but they are a bit rough around the edges and resent anyone trying to help them. Guest Stars: Ryan Gosling, Ben Cook
88	"After the Ball is Over"	Graeme Lynch	Raymond Storey	March 10, 1996	710
Great Aunt Eliza's cousin Winifred comes to stay at the King farm. Winifred has dementia and is dying, but she has some secrets to tell Eliza before she goes. Guest Stars: Kay Tremblay, Rosemary Dunsmore, Frances Bay
89	"Return to Me"	F. Harvey Frost	Raymond Storey	March 17, 1996	711
Felicity receives a mysterious telephone call from a nurse about a patient in distress. Felicity manages to trace the call. The call came from Charleston, South Carolina, the place Gus Pike supposedly drowned. Hetty and Felicity travel to the States to try to find Gus, leaving Stuart McRae to wonder whether or not their wedding will take place. Guest Stars: Gema Zamprogna, Michael Mahonen, David Ferry
90	"The Last Hurrah"	William Brayne	Laurie Pearson	March 24, 1996	712
Jasper Dale arrives home from England and is bubbling over with excitement from his year there. But upon his arrival, he and Olivia must figure out how to keep their cannery open after the more modern cannery in Carmody is able to offer higher prices to the fishermen. Guest Stars: R.H. Thomson, David Ferry
91	"So Dear to My Heart"	Graeme Lynch	Marlene Matthews	March 31, 1996	713
Felicity and Hetty arrive back in Avonlea with Gus, and Felicity has yet to tell Gus about Stuart. Jasper and Olivia announce they are leaving for England after being told they cannot rebuild the cannery, and Felix joins the Navy! But all these changes in Avonlea and in the lives of the Kings threaten to ruin the day everyone had been waiting for: Gus and Felicity's wedding. Sara returns to Avonlea. Guest Stars: Gema Zamprogna, R.H. Thomson, Sarah Polley, Michael Mahonen, Marilyn Lightstone, David Ferry

=== Special (1998) ===
Title	Original release date
"An Avonlea Christmas"	December 13, 1998
Felix is declared missing in action during the War. Janet King starts to estrange her family over the issue of wanting him back over duty. A Health concern with Hetty may be the deciding event before the holidays.

== Home releases ==
Season	Episodes	Discs	Release Date
1	13	4	November 20, 2002
2	13	4	November 21, 2003
3	13	4	November 22, 2004
4	13	4	November 22, 2004
5	13	4	June 7, 2005
6	13	4	May 2, 2006
7	13	4	November 20, 2007
