= Who Has Seen the Wind =

Who Has Seen the Wind may refer to:

- Who Has Seen the Wind (novel), 1947 novel by Canadian author W. O. Mitchell
- Who Has Seen the Wind?, a 1965 television film produced by the United Nations
- "Who Has Seen the Wind?" (song), by Yoko Ono
- Who Has Seen the Wind (1977 film), Canadian production based on W. O. Mitchell's novel
