= José Ferrer =

Puerto Rican actor and director (1912–1992)

- Ferrer in 1952
- Born: José Vicente Ferrer de Otero y Cintrón; January 8, 1912; San Juan, Puerto Rico
- Died: January 26, 1992 (aged 80); Coral Gables, Florida, U.S.
- Resting place: Santa María Magdalena de Pazzis Cemetery, San Juan
- Education: Princeton University (1933, B.Arch)
- Occupations: Actor; film director; theatre director
- Years active: 1935–1992
- Spouses: Uta Hagen (m. 1938; div. 1948); Phyllis Hill (m. 1948; div. 1953); Rosemary Clooney (m. 1953; div. 1961) (m. 1964; div. 1967); Stella Magee (m. 1977)
- Children: 6, including Miguel Ferrer
- Relatives: Debby Boone (daughter-in-law); Tessa Ferrer (granddaughter); George Clooney (nephew)
- Awards: National Medal of Arts (1985)

José Vicente Ferrer de Otero y Cintrón (January 8, 1912 – January 26, 1992) was a Puerto Rican actor and director of stage, film and television. He was one of the most celebrated and esteemed Hispanic American actors during his lifetime and after, with a career spanning nearly 60 years between 1935 and 1992. He achieved prominence for his portrayal of Cyrano de Bergerac in the play of the same name, which earned him the inaugural Tony Award for Best Actor in a Play in 1947. He reprised the role in a 1950 film version and won an Academy Award for Best Actor, making him both the first Hispanic and the first Puerto Rican–born actor to win an Academy Award.

His other notable film roles include Charles VII in Joan of Arc (1948), Henri de Toulouse-Lautrec in Moulin Rouge (1952), defense attorney Barney Greenwald in The Caine Mutiny (1954), Alfred Dreyfus in I Accuse! (1958), which he also directed; the Turkish Bey in Lawrence of Arabia (1962), Siegfried Rieber in Ship of Fools (1965), and Emperor Shaddam IV in Dune (1984). Ferrer also maintained a prolific acting and directing career on Broadway, winning a second Best Actor Tony for The Shrike, and Best Director for The Shrike, The Fourposter, and Stalag 17. Additionally, Ferrer appeared numerous times in the works of Shakespeare, notably as Iago in Othello.

Ferrer was the father of actor Miguel Ferrer, the brother of Rafael Ferrer, the grandfather of actress Tessa Ferrer, and the uncle of actor George Clooney. His contributions to American theatre were recognized in 1981 when he was inducted into the American Theater Hall of Fame. In 1985, he received the National Medal of Arts from President Reagan, becoming the first actor so honored.

== Early life ==
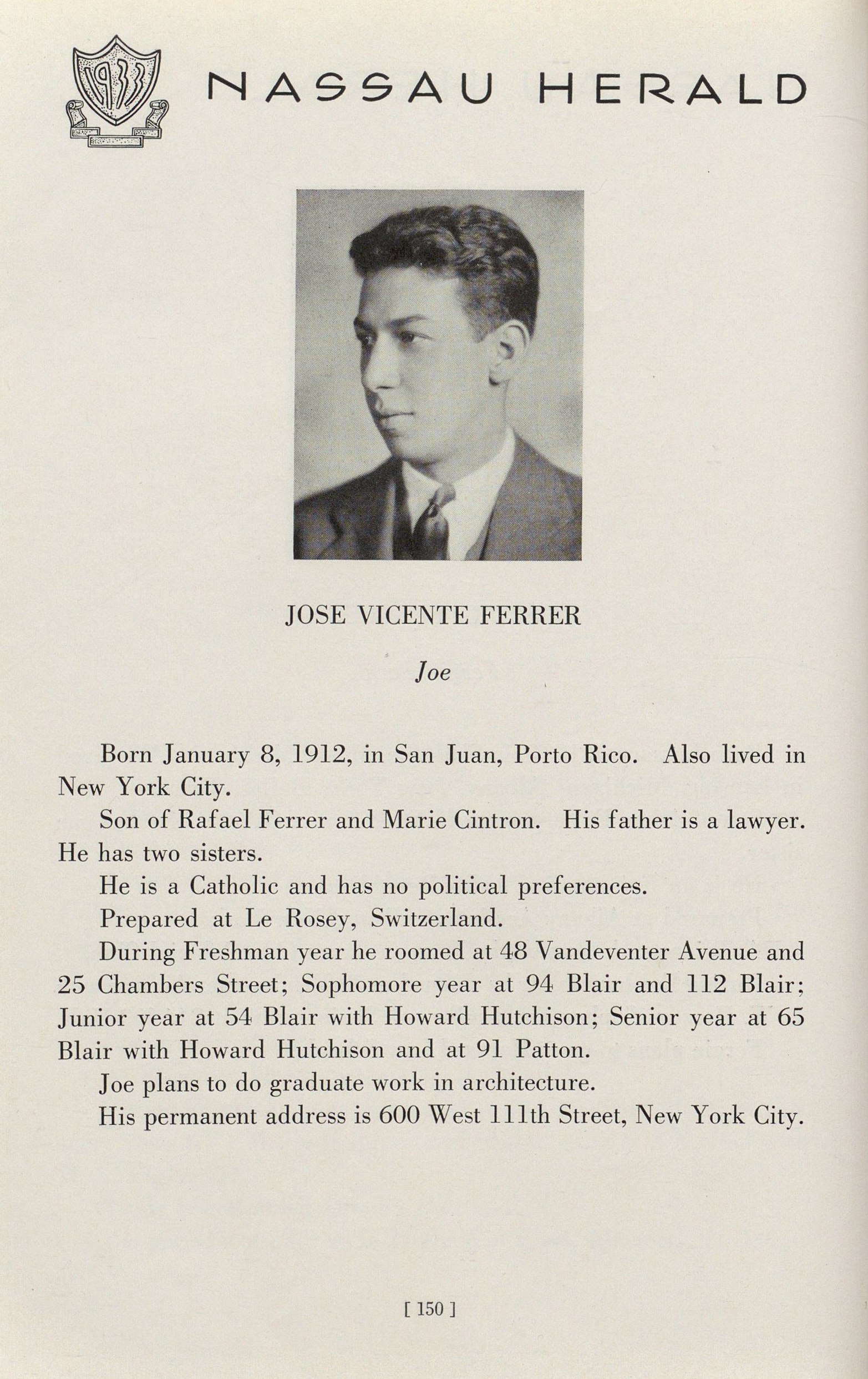
Ferrer in the Princeton University yearbook, 1933

Ferrer was born in San Juan, Puerto Rico, the son of Rafael Ferrer, a local attorney and writer, and María Providencia Cintrón, of Yabucoa. He was the grandson of Gabriel Ferrer Hernández, a doctor and advocate of Puerto Rican independence from Spain. He had two younger sisters, Elvira and Leticia. Born into a wealthy Criollo family, his upbringing was influenced by the arts, music and humanities.

The family moved to New York in 1914, when Ferrer was two years old, following the death of his mother. He studied part of his elemental education at Colegio San José in Río Piedras. From there, Ferrer was enrolled at the Swiss boarding school Institut Le Rosey. He was interested in literature, music and painting, but only the first of these was widespread there. Ferrer, who had speech issues early in his life, went on to learn five languages, including Spanish, English, French, and Italian.

In 1933, Ferrer completed his bachelor's degree in architecture at Princeton University, where he wrote his senior thesis on "French Naturalism and Pardo Bazán". Ferrer was also a member of the Princeton Triangle Club and played piano in a band, "José Ferrer and His Pied Pipers". At Princeton he took part in plays by James Stewart and Joshua Logan. His studies in architecture gave him insight on painting techniques. Bret Bush of the Triangle Club convinced him to participate in an audition that changed his life. Ferrer then studied Romance languages at Columbia University for 1934–35.

== Career ==
=== Theatre ===
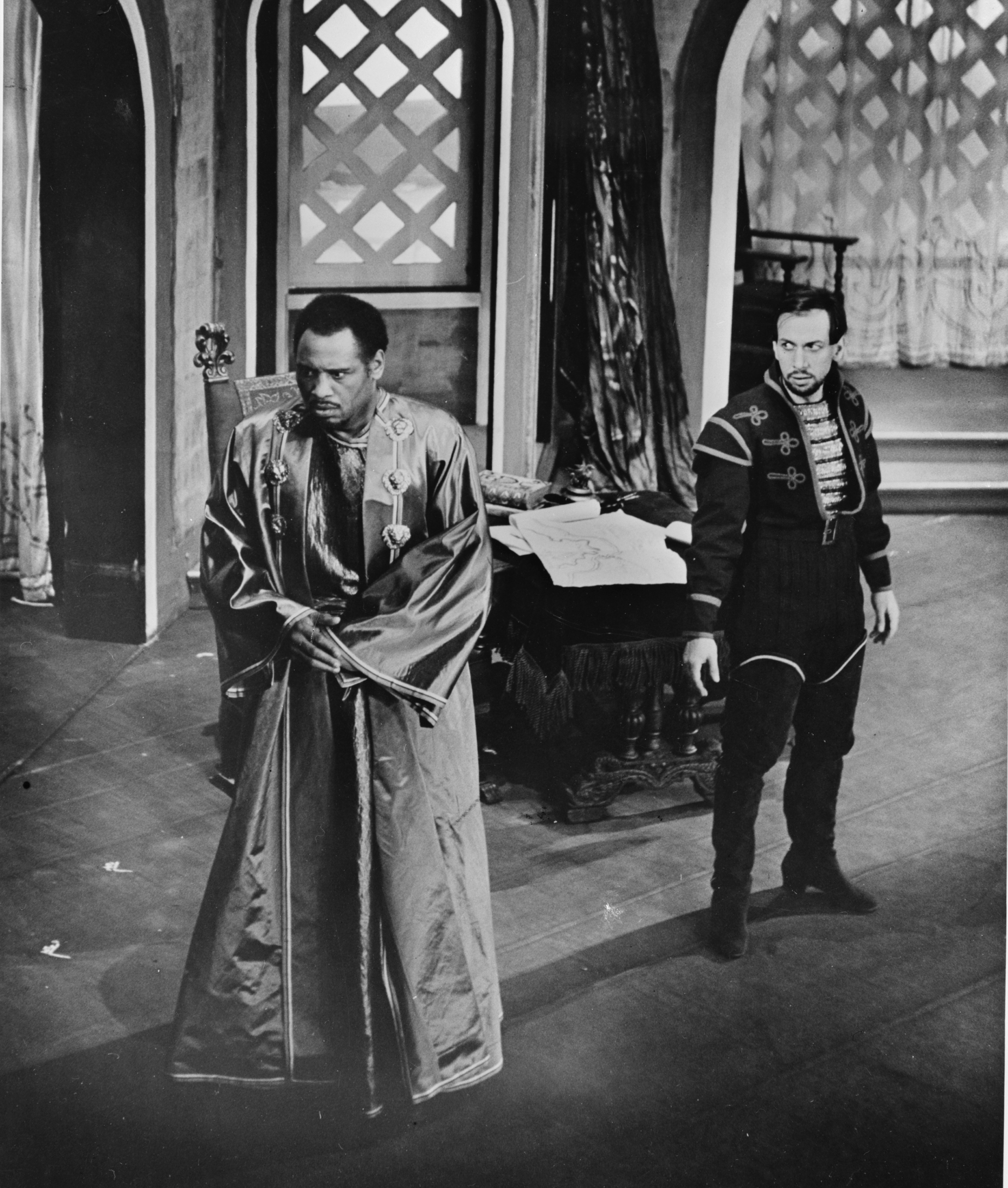
Paul Robeson (Othello) and Ferrer (Iago) in the 1943 Theatre Guild production of Othello

Ferrer's first professional appearance as an actor was at a "showboat" theater on Long Island in the summer of 1934.

In 1935, Ferrer was the stage manager at the Suffern Country Playhouse, operated by Joshua Logan, whom Ferrer had known at Princeton. Ruth Gordon and Helen Hayes recommended him to the theatrical producer Jed Harris.

Ferrer made his Broadway debut in 1935 in A Slight Case of Murder which ran for 69 performances.

He was also seen in Stick-in-the-Mud (1935) and Spring Dance (1936). Ferrer's first big success was in Brother Rat (1936–38) which ran for 577 performances. In Clover only ran for three performances. How to Get Tough About It (1938) also had a short run, as did Missouri Legend (1938).

Mamba's Daughters (1939) ran for 163 performances. Ferrer followed it with Key Largo (1939–40) with Paul Muni and directed by Guthrie McClintic, which went for 105 shows and was later turned into a film.

Ferrer had a huge personal success in the title role of Charley's Aunt (1940–41), partly in drag, under the direction of Joshua Logan. It went for 233 performances.

Ferrer then replaced Danny Kaye in the musical Let's Face It! (1943).

=== Theatre director and Cyrano ===
Ferrer made his debut on Broadway as director with Vickie (1942) in which he also starred. It only had a short run.

He played Iago in Margaret Webster's Broadway production of Othello (1943–44), which starred Paul Robeson in the title role, Webster as Emilia, and Ferrer's wife, Uta Hagen, as Desdemona. That production still holds the record for longest-running repeat performance of a Shakespearean play presented in the United States, going for 296 performances (it would be revived in 1945).

Ferrer produced and directed, but did not appear in, Strange Fruit (1945–46), starring Mel Ferrer (no relation).

Among other radio roles, Ferrer starred as detective Philo Vance in a 1945 series of the same name.

=== Cyrano de Bergerac ===
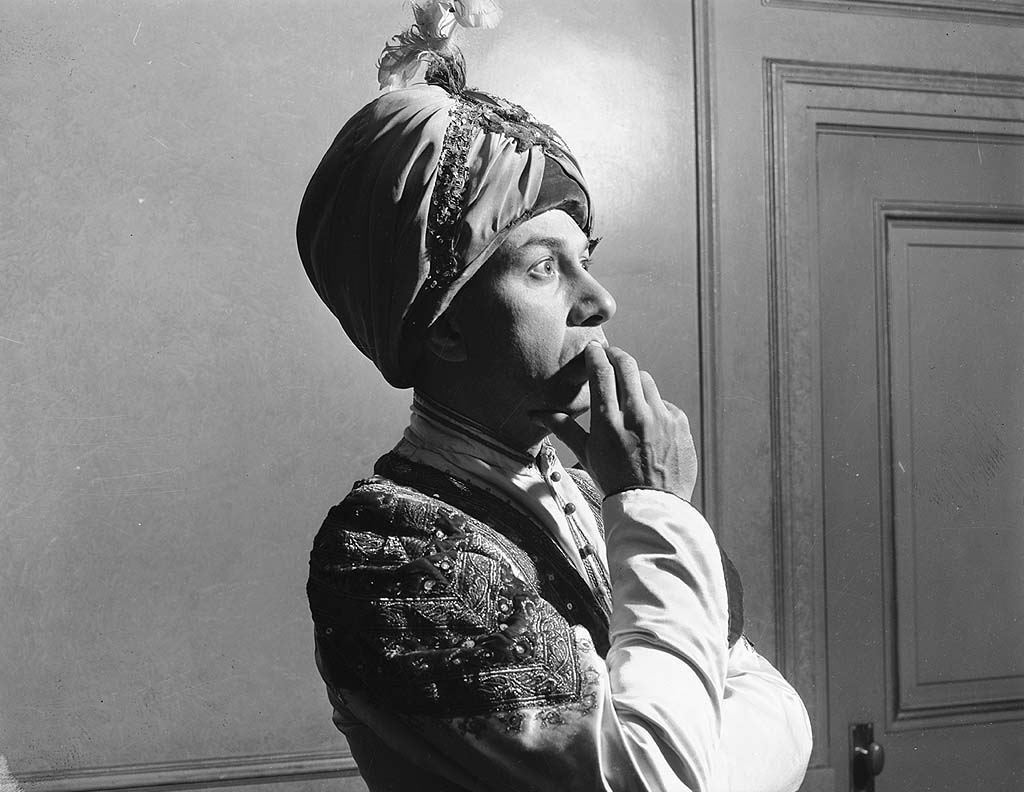
Ferrer in costume in an unnamed play at Maple Leaf Gardens

Ferrer may be best remembered for his performance in the title role of Cyrano de Bergerac, which he first played on Broadway in 1946. Ferrer feared that the production would be a failure in rehearsals, due to the open dislike for the play by director Mel Ferrer (no relation), so he called in Joshua Logan (who had directed his star-making performance in Charley's Aunt) to serve as "play doctor" for the production. Logan wrote that he simply had to eliminate pieces of business which director Ferrer had inserted in his staging; they presumably were intended to sabotage the more sentimental elements of the play that the director considered to be corny and in bad taste. The production became one of the hits of the 1946/47 Broadway season, winning Ferrer the first Best Actor Tony Award for his depiction of the long-nosed poet/swordsman.

On January 9, 1949, Ferrer made his television debut when he starred in The Philco Television Playhouse's one-hour adaptation of the play.

Ferrer directed, but did not appear in, As We Forgive Our Debtors (1947), which ran 5 performances. There was another short run for Volpone (1947) which Ferrer adapted and played the title role.

=== Early films ===
Ferrer made his film debut in the Technicolor epic Joan of Arc (1948) as the weak-willed Dauphin opposite Ingrid Bergman as Joan. Ferrer's performance earned him an Oscar nomination for Best Supporting Actor.

At the City Center, he acted in revivals of Angel Street (1948) and The Alchemist (1948) and directed S. S. Glencairn (1948) and The Insect Comedy (1948) (also appearing in the latter).

Ferrer had another Broadway hit with The Silver Whistle (1948–49) which ran for 219 performances. He performed two shows for The Philco-Goodyear Television Playhouse on TV in 1949: Cyrano, playing the title role, and an adaptation of What Makes Sammy Run?, playing Sammy Glick (adapted by Paddy Chayefsky).

Ferrer returned to Hollywood to appear in Otto Preminger's Whirlpool (1950), supporting Gene Tierney, and Richard Brooks' Crisis (1950), opposite Cary Grant.

=== Film stardom ===
Ferrer then played the title role in Cyrano de Bergerac (1950), directed by Michael Gordon and produced by Stanley Kramer. Ferrer won the Best Actor Oscar, becoming the first actor to win the Oscar for the same role which won him the Tony. The film was widely seen although it lost money. After winning the Oscar, Ferrer was received with fanfare in Puerto Rico which included the appearance of his friend and fellow actor Juano Hernández and was hosted by the governor. Ferrer donated the Oscar to the University of Puerto Rico (UPR), and it was subsequently stolen in 2000.

Ferrer returned to Broadway for a revival of Twentieth Century (1950–51) which he directed and starred in, opposite Gloria Swanson; it went for 233 performances. Immediately following, he produced and directed, but did not appear in, Stalag 17 (1951–52), a big hit running for 472 performances. Even more popular was The Fourposter (1951–53) in which he directed Hume Cronyn and Jessica Tandy; it ran for 632 performances.

Ferrer returned to cinema screens in the comedy Anything Can Happen (1952), directed by George Seaton, where Ferrer played an immigrant.

More popular was Moulin Rouge (1952) in which Ferrer played the role of Toulouse-Lautrec under John Huston's direction. Ferrer received 40% of the profits as well as his third and final Oscar nomination. Despite not being an activist and having been interviewed by the HUAC, Ferrer's stances placed him at odds with the American Legion, which disapproved the content of Moulin Rouge.

Back on Broadway, Ferrer directed and starred in The Shrike (1952), which ran for 161 performances.

His next two shows were as director only: Horton Foote's The Chase (1952) only had a short run but My Three Angels (1953–54), went for 344 performances.

Ferrer had another cinema hit with Miss Sadie Thompson (1953) starring Rita Hayworth. Ferrer briefly revived some of his shows at the City Centre in 1953: Cyrano, The Shrike, Richard III, Charley's Aunt.

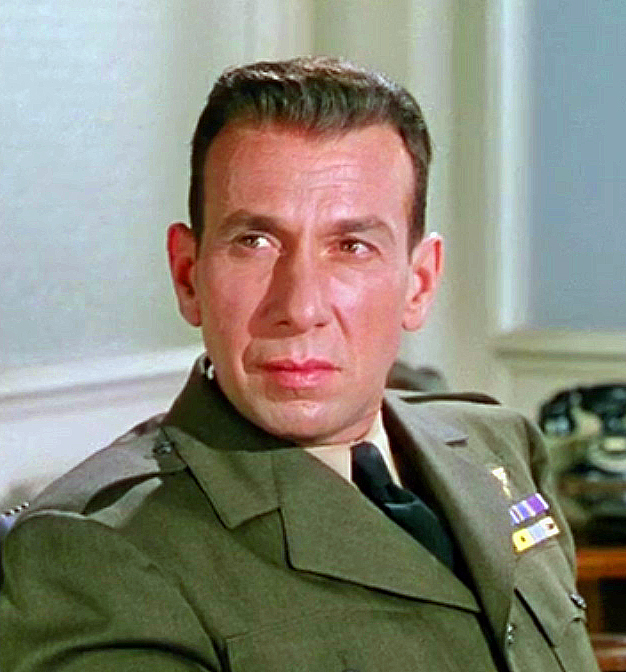
Ferrer as Lieutenant Barney Greenwald in The Caine Mutiny, released in 1954

He returned to films with The Caine Mutiny (1954) for Kramer, co-starring with Humphrey Bogart and Van Johnson, playing defense lawyer Barney Greenwald; the film was a huge hit. Greenwald's Jewish faith, so prominent in the novel that it informed his judgments of the U.S.S. Caine's officers, was downplayed in the film, as Ferrer, being Puerto Rican, was nominally Roman Catholic.

Also popular was Deep in My Heart (1955) where Ferrer played Sigmund Romberg, and which made a profit of over $1 million.

=== Film director ===
Ferrer made his debut as film director at Universal with an adaptation of The Shrike (1955), in which he also starred opposite June Allyson. He decided to work on this film after becoming frustrated that he was only being cast in stereotypical roles that degraded Latinos to the prejudices of the era.

Ferrer then performed Cyrano in an episode of Producers' Showcase on television, directed by Mel Ferrer and co-starring Claire Bloom.

He went to England to star in and direct a war film for Warwick Productions, The Cockleshell Heroes (1955), alongside Trevor Howard; it was a success at the British box office.

Ferrer co-wrote, directed and starred in the film The Great Man (1956), at Universal. He directed and starred in two films for MGM: I Accuse! (1958), where he played Captain Alfred Dreyfus, and The High Cost of Loving (1958) a comedy with Gena Rowlands. Both flopped at the box office.

Back on Broadway, Ferrer co-wrote and directed the stage musical Oh, Captain! (1958) with Tony Randall, which only had a short run. He directed and starred in Edwin Booth (1958), playing the title role; it was not a success.

In 1958, Ferrer narrated the children's album Tubby the Tuba, which was nominated for the Best Recording For Children at the 1st Annual Grammy Awards.

Ferrer took over the direction of the troubled musical Juno (1959) from Vincent J. Donehue, who had himself taken over from Tony Richardson. The show, which starred Shirley Booth, folded after 16 performances and mixed to extremely negative critical reaction.

However, he followed it directing the original stage production of Saul Levitt's The Andersonville Trial (1959–60), about the trial following the revelation of conditions at the infamous Civil War prison. It was a hit and featured George C. Scott, running for 179 performances.

Around this time, Ferrer also appeared in television in episodes of General Electric Theater and The United States Steel Hour.

=== 20th Century Fox ===
Ferrer signed a contract with 20th Century Fox to direct films. He made Return to Peyton Place (1961) and State Fair (1962), both of which were commercial disappointments.

Ferrer had a key support role in the film Lawrence of Arabia (1962) which was a huge success. Although Ferrer's performance was only small he said it was his best on screen.

At Fox, he played an investigating police officer in Nine Hours to Rama (1963). He also guest starred on The Greatest Show on Earth.

Ferrer returned to Broadway to star in Noël Coward's musical The Girl Who Came to Supper (1963–64) which ran for 112 performances.

He narrated the first episode of the popular 1964 sitcom Bewitched, in mock documentary style.

Ferrer went to Germany to make Stop Train 349 (1963) with Sean Flynn. He appeared in the 1964 French film Cyrano et d'Artagnan directed by Abel Gance.

Back in Hollywood, Ferrer played Herod Antipas in The Greatest Story Ever Told (1965) and was in Ship of Fools (1965) for Stanley Kramer.

A notable performance of his later stage career was as Miguel de Cervantes and his fictional creation Don Quixote in the hit musical Man of La Mancha. Ferrer took over the role from Richard Kiley in 1966 and subsequently went on tour with it in the first national company of the show. Tony Martinez continued in the role of Sancho Panza under Ferrer, as he had with Kiley.

Ferrer starred in Carl Reiner's Enter Laughing (1967) and did a production of Kismet (1967) on TV. He went to Europe to do Cervantes (1967) and appeared in A Case of Libel (1968) for US TV. He also provided the voice of the evil Ben Haramed in the 1968 Rankin/Bass Christmas TV special The Little Drummer Boy. In 1968 the IRS sent him a tax bill of $122,000 going back to 1962.

=== 1970s ===
Ferrer appeared in the television films The Aquarians (1970), Gideon (1971) and Crosscurrent (1971) and guest-starred on The Name of the Game and Banyon.

Ferrer directed The Web and the Rock (1972) on stage in New York and appeared in The Marcus-Nelson Murders (1973), Orson Welles Great Mysteries (1973), and Columbo.

Around 1973, he narrated A Touch of Royalty, a documentary on the life and death of Puerto Rico's baseball star Roberto Clemente. Ferrer voiced both versions, Spanish and English.

Ferrer voiced a highly truncated cartoon version of Cyrano for an episode of The ABC Afterschool Special in 1974.

Ferrer appeared in The Missing Are Deadly (1975), Forever Young, Forever Free (1975), Order to Assassinate (1975), Medical Story (1975), The Art of Crime (1975), Truman at Potsdam (1976) (playing Stalin), The Big Bus (1976), Paco (1976)., Voyage of the Damned (1976), Crash! (1976), The Sentinel (1977), Zoltan, Hound of Dracula (1977), Exo-Man (1977), Who Has Seen the Wind (1977), The Rhinemann Exchange, The Private Files of J. Edgar Hoover (1977), Fedora (1978) from Billy Wilder, The Amazing Captain Nemo (1978) (in the title role), and The Swarm. He guest starred on Starsky and Hutch and Tales of the Unexpected.

During the Bicentennial, Ferrer narrated the world premiere of Michael Jeffrey Shapiro's A Declaration of Independence, July 4, 1776 for narrator and orchestra with Martin Rich leading the Philharmonic Symphony of Westchester.

Ferrer was a replacement cast member in a production of David Mamet's A Life in the Theatre (1977–78). He produced and starred in White Pelicans (1978) and directed Carmelina (1979) on stage but it only ran 17 performances.

He was in The Fifth Musketeer (1979), The Concorde ... Airport '79 (1979), Natural Enemies (1979), The French Atlantic Affair (1979), A Life of Sin, a 1979 film by Puerto Rican director Efraín López Neris which also starred Raul Julia, Míriam Colón and Henry Darrow, and Battles: The Murder That Wouldn't Die (1980). He did The Merchant on stage in Canada.

=== 1980s ===
In 1980, he had a role as future Justice Abe Fortas in the made-for-television film version of Anthony Lewis' Gideon's Trumpet, opposite Henry Fonda in an Emmy-nominated performance as Clarence Earl Gideon.

He also appeared in Battle Creek Brawl (1980), Pleasure Palace (1980), The Dream Merchants (1980), Magnum, P.I., Evita Peron (1981), Berlin Tunnel 21 (1981), Peter and Paul (1981) with Anthony Hopkins, Bloody Birthday (1981), Woody Allen's A Midsummer Night's Sex Comedy (1982) (a classy yet somewhat antagonistic university professor/author whose booming voice both begins and ends the film), Blood Tide (1982), Blood Feud (1982), This Girl for Hire (1983), The Being (1983) and Mel Brooks's version of To Be or Not to Be (1983).

From 1982 to 1985, he was artistic director of the Coconut Grove Theatre in Miami.

He guest-starred on Quincy, M.E., Another World, Fantasy Island, Hotel, The Love Boat, Bridges to Cross, and Murder, She Wrote.

Ferrer was in The Evil That Men Do (1984), Samson and Delilah (1984), and George Washington (1984). He was the Emperor in Dune (1984) and was in Hitler's SS: Portrait in Evil (1985), Seduced (1985), The Covenant (1985), Blood & Orchids (1986), Young Harry Houdini, and The Wind in the Willows (1987).

Ferrer made his farewell to Cyrano by performing a short passage from the play for the 1986 Tony Awards telecast.

Although not the original actor to play the character, Ferrer, beginning in the third season, had a recurring role as Julia Duffy's WASPy father in the long-running television series Newhart in the 1980s.

In an interview given in the 1980s, he bemoaned the lack of good character parts for aging stars, and admitted that he now took on roles mostly for the money, such as his roles in the horror potboilers The Swarm, in which he played a doctor, and Dracula's Dog, in which he played a police inspector.

Ferrer's final performances include The Sun and the Moon (1987), American Playhouse ("Strange Interlude" with Kenneth Branagh), Mother's Day (1989), Matlock, Hired to Kill (1990), Old Explorers (1990) and The Perfect Tribute.

His final appearances in theater took place in The Best Man (1988) and All my sons (1990). He was cast in a Broadway play Conversations with My Father (1991) but withdrew due to poor health. Lam Gong juen ji fan fei jo fung wan (1992) was Ferrer's final film.

=== Legacy ===
- Ferrer was the first Hispanic actor to win an Academy Award.
- In 2005, the Hispanic Organization of Latin Actors (HOLA) renamed its Tespis Award to the HOLA José Ferrer Tespis Award.
- Ferrer was honored for his theatrical and cinematic works with an induction into the American Theatre Hall of Fame and a National Medal of Arts, becoming the first actor and Hispanic to be presented with the prestigious award.
- Ferrer's sons Rafael Ferrer and Miguel Ferrer, his daughter (Letty Ferrer), and his granddaughter Tessa Ferrer also became actors and actresses.
- Ferrer donated his Academy Award to the University of Puerto Rico. The award was stolen after being misplaced during the remodeling of the university's theater.
- On April 26, 2012, the United States Postal Service issued a stamp in Ferrer's honor in its Distinguished Americans series.

== Personal life ==
He had two sisters, Leticia García and Elvira Villafañe, and a half brother Rafael.

Ferrer was married five times and had six children:

- Uta Hagen (1938–1948): Ferrer and Hagen met while playing summer stock in Ridgefield, Connecticut in 1938. They had one child. They divorced in 1948, partly due to Hagen's long-concealed affair with Paul Robeson, with whom Hagen and Ferrer had co-starred in the Broadway production of Othello.
- Phyllis Hill (1948–1953): Ferrer and Hill wed on May 27, 1948, and they moved to Burlington, Vermont in 1950. Ferrer returned to Puerto Rico because his mother died. They divorced on January 12, 1953.
- Rosemary Clooney (1953–1961): Ferrer first married Clooney on July 13, 1953, in Durant, Oklahoma. They moved to Santa Monica, California, in 1954, and then to Los Angeles in 1958. Ferrer and Clooney had five children. They divorced for the first time in 1961.
- Rosemary Clooney (1964–1967): Ferrer and Clooney remarried on November 22, 1964, in Los Angeles; however, the marriage again crumbled because Ferrer was carrying on an affair with the woman who would become his last wife, Stella Magee. Clooney found out about the affair, and she and Ferrer divorced again in 1967.
- Stella Magee (1977–1992): They remained together until his death in 1992.

Through his marriage to Clooney, Ferrer was the uncle of actor George Clooney. Ferrer is the father-in-law to singer Debby Boone who is the daughter of singer Pat Boone, and to actress Leilani Sarelle, and the grandfather of actress Tessa Ferrer.

In October 1949, Ferrer received an honoris causa degree from the UPR. In his free time, he was an aficionado of the sport of boxing. Ferrer supported Miguel's decision to become an actor and both worked together in an episode of Magnum P.I.. Although he preferred that his son become a pianist, he allowed Miguel to play the battery as long as he practiced often. Ferrer is the topic of a poem, Señor Actor, which reflects on his accomplishments as an actor.

== Death ==
Ferrer died of colorectal cancer in Coral Gables, Florida, on January 26, 1992, 18 days after his 80th birthday, and was interred in Santa María Magdalena de Pazzis Cemetery in Old San Juan in his native Puerto Rico.

== Acting credits ==
=== Film ===
Year	Title	Role	Notes
1948	Joan of Arc	The Dauphin, Charles VII	Nominated – Academy Award for Best Supporting Actor
1950	Whirlpool	David Korvo	
1950	The Secret Fury	José	Uncredited
1950	Crisis	Raoul Farrago	
1950	Cyrano de Bergerac	Cyrano de Bergerac	Academy Award for Best Actor; Golden Globe Award for Best Actor in a Motion Picture – Drama; Nominated – New York Film Critics Circle Award for Best Actor
1952	Anything Can Happen	Giorgi Papashvily	
1952	Moulin Rouge	Henri de Toulouse-Lautrec	Nominated – Academy Award for Best Actor
1953	Miss Sadie Thompson	Alfred Davidson	
1954	The Caine Mutiny	Lt. Barney Greenwald	Nominated – BAFTA Award for Best Foreign Actor
1954	Deep in My Heart	Sigmund Romberg	
1955	The Shrike	Jim Downs	Also director
1955	The Cockleshell Heroes	Major Stringer	Also director
1956	The Great Man	Joe Harris	Also director
1957	Four Girls in Town	Director	Also director
1958	I Accuse!	Capt. Alfred Dreyfus	Also director
1958	The High Cost of Loving	Jim "Jimbo" Fry	Also director
1961	Return to Peyton Place	Voice of Mark Steele	Also director, uncredited
1962	State Fair		Director
1962	Lawrence of Arabia	Turkish Bey	
1963	Nine Hours to Rama	Supt. Gopal Das	
1963	Stop Train 349	Cowan the Reporter	
1964	Cyrano et d'Artagnan	Cyrano de Bergerac	
1965	The Greatest Story Ever Told	Herod Antipas	
1965	Ship of Fools	Siegfried Rieber	
1967	Enter Laughing	Mr. Harrison B. Marlowe	
1967	Cervantes	Hassan Bey	
1975	Forever Young, Forever Free	Father Alberto	Aka: e'Lollipop
1975	El clan de los immorales	Inspector Reed	
1976	Paco	Fermin Flores	
1976	The Big Bus	Ironman	
1976	Voyage of the Damned	Manuel Benitez	
1976	Crash!	Marc Denne	
1977	The Sentinel	Priest of the Brotherhood	
1977	Who Has Seen the Wind	The Ben	
1977	The Private Files of J. Edgar Hoover	Lionel McCoy	
1978	Dracula's Dog	Inspector Branco	
1978	Fedora	Doctor Vando	
1978	The Swarm	Dr. Andrews	
1979	The French Atlantic Affair		
1979	The Fifth Musketeer	Athos	
1979	The Concorde ... Airport '79	Chief Superintendent Morabito	(TV version), Uncredited
1979	Natural Enemies	Harry Rosenthal	
1980	The Dream Merchants		
1980	The Big Brawl	Domenici	
1981	Bloody Birthday	Doctor	
1982	A Midsummer Night's Sex Comedy	Leopold	
1982	Blood Tide	Nereus	
1982	And They Are Off	Martin Craig	
1983	The Being	Mayor Gordon Lane	
1983	To Be or Not to Be	Prof. Siletski	
1984	The Evil That Men Do	Dr. Hector Lomelin	
1984	Dune	Padishah Emperor Shaddam IV	
1987	The Sun and the Moon	Don Fulhencio	
1990	Hired to Kill	Rallis	
1990	Old Explorers	Warner Watney	

=== Television ===
Year	Title	Role	Notes
1953	Producers' Showcase:	Cyrano de Bergerac	Episode: "Cyrano de Bergerac" Nominated – Primetime Emmy Award for Best Actor – Single Performance
1964	Bewitched	Narrator	3 episodes
1967	Kismet	Hajj	TV Film
1968	The Little Drummer Boy	Ben Haramad	Voice, Television Special
1974	Columbo	Dr. Marshall Cahill	Episode: "Mind Over Mayhem"
1976–78	Starsky & Hutch	Crazy Joe Fortune	3 episodes
1977	The Rhinemann Exchange	Erich Rhinemann	Mini-series
1978	The Return of Captain Nemo	Captain Nemo	Mini-series
1979	Tales of the Unexpected	Carlos	Episode: "The Man from the South"
1979	The French Atlantic Affair	President Aristide Brouchard	Mini-series
1980	The Dream Merchants	George Pappas	Mini-series
1981	Peter and Paul	Gamaliel	Mini-series
1981	Magnum, P.I.	Robert Caine	Episode: "Lest We Forget"
1981-86	The Love Boat	Simon Beck/Deke Donnor	3 episodes
1982	Quincy, M.E.	Dr. Stanley Royce	Episode: "Ghost of a Chance"
1983	Fantasy Island	Nikolos Karavatos	Episode: "Random Choices/Mommy the Mood Swinger"
1983	Blood Feud	Edward Bennett Williams	Television film
1984	George Washington	Robert Dinwiddie	Mini-series
1985–87	Newhart	Arthur Vanderkellen	6 episodes
1985	Hitler's SS: Portrait in Evil	Ludwig Rosenberg	TV Film
1986–91	Matlock	Nicholas Baron	3 episodes
1987	The Wind in the Willows	Badger	Voice, TV Film
1988	Sesame Street	Tío José	2 episodes
1991	Maniac Mansion	Himself	Episode: "The Celebrity Visitor"

=== Theater ===
Date	Title	Role	Director	Producer	Playwright	Notes
September 11 – November 1935	A Slight Case of Murder	2nd Policeman	Damon Runyon and Howard Lindsay	Howard Lindsay	Damon Runyon and Howard Lindsay	Also Stage Manager
November 26 – December 1935	Stick-in-the-Mud	Chauffeur	Thomas Mitchell	Jack Curtis and Carleton Hoagland	Frederick Hazlitt Brennan	
August 25 – September 1936	Spring Dance	The Lippincot	Jed Harris	Jed Harris	Philip Barry	
December 16, 1936 – April 23, 1938	Brother Rat	Dan Crawford	George Abbott	George Abbott	John Monks Jr. and Fred F. Finklehoffe	
October 13–15, 1937	In Clover	Frederick L. Parsons	Bretaigne Windust	John Krimsky and Jerrold Krimsky	Allan Scott	
February 8 – February 1938	How to Get Tough About It	Vergez	Guthrie McClintic	Guthrie McClintic	Robert Ardrey	
September 19 – October 1938	Missouri Legend	Billy Gashade	Guthrie McClintic	Guthrie McClintic and Max Gordon	E.B. Ginty	
January 3 – May 1939	Mamba's Daughters	St. Julien DeC. Wentworth	Guthrie McClintic	Guthrie McClintic	DuBose Heyward and Dorothy Heyward	
November 27, 1939 – February 24, 1940	Key Largo	Victor D'Alcala	Guthrie McClintic	The Playwrights' Company	Maxwell Anderson	
October 17, 1940 – May 3, 1941	Charley's Aunt	Lord Fancourt Babberley	Joshua Logan	Day Tuttle and Richard Skinner	Brandon Thomas	
February 28 – March 20, 1943	Let's Face It!	Jerry Walker	Edgar MacGregor	Vinton Freedley	Music and Lyrics by Cole Porter; Book by Herbert Fields and Dorothy Fields	Replacement for Danny Kaye
September 22 – October 31, 1942	Vickie	George Roberts	José Ferrer and Frank Mandel	Frank Mandel	Sig Herzig	
October 19, 1943 – July 1, 1944	Othello	Iago	Margaret Webster	Theatre Guild	William Shakespeare, adapted by Margaret Webster	
May 22 – June 10, 1945	Othello	Iago	Margaret Webster	Theatre Guild	William Shakespeare, adapted by Margaret Webster	Revival
November 26, 1945 – January 16, 1946	Strange Fruit	N/A	José Ferrer	José Ferrer	Lillian Smith	
October 8, 1946 – March 22, 1947	Cyrano de Bergerac	Cyrano de Bergerac	Mel Ferrer	José Ferrer	Edmond Rostand, translated by Brian Hooker	Tony Award for Best Actor in a Play; Adapted for The Philco Television Playhouse in 1949 and as Cyrano de Bergerac in 1950
March 9–16, 1947	As We Forgive Our Debtors	N/A	José Ferrer	José Ferrer	Tillman Breiseth	
January 8–18, 1948	Volpone	Volpone	Richard Barr	New York City Theatre Company	Ben Jonson, adapted by José Ferrer, Richard Barr, and Richard Whorf	Co-adapter
January 22 – February 1, 1948	Angel Street	Mr. Manningham	Richard Barr	New York City Theatre Company	Patrick Hamilton	
May 6–16, 1948	The Alchemist	Jeremy/Face	Morton DaCosta	New York City Theatre Company	Ben Jonson	
May 20–30, 1948	S.S. Glencairn	N/A	José Ferrer	New York City Theatre Company	Eugene O'Neill	Collection of the one-act plays In the Zone, Bound East for Cardiff, The Long Voyage Home, and The Moon of the Caribbees
Jun 3–12, 1948	The Insect Comedy	Felix, Yellow Commander	José Ferrer	New York City Theatre Company	Karel Čapek and Josef Čapek, adapted by Owen Davis	
November 24, 1948 – May 28, 1949	The Silver Whistle	Oliver Erwinter	Paul Crabtree	Theatre Guild	Robert E. McEnroe	
December 24, 1950 – June 30, 1951	Twentieth Century	Oscar Jaffe	José Ferrer	José Ferrer	Ben Hecht and Charles MacArthur	Ferrer stepped down from the lead role on June 2 and was replaced by Robert Preston from June 4–30
May 8, 1951 – June 21, 1952	Stalag 17	N/A	José Ferrer	José Ferrer	Donald Bevan and Edmund Trzcinski	Tony Award for Best Director
October 24, 1951 – May 2, 1953	The Fourposter	N/A	José Ferrer	The Playwrights' Company	Jan de Hartog	Tony Award for Best Director
January 15 – May 31, 1952	The Shrike	Jim Downs	José Ferrer	José Ferrer	Joseph Kramm	Adapted as The Shrike in 1955; Tony Award for Best Director; Tony Award for Best Actor in a Play
April 15 – May 10, 1952	The Chase	N/A	José Ferrer	José Ferrer	Horton Foote	
March 11, 1953 – January 4, 1954	My Three Angels	N/A	José Ferrer	Saint Subber, Rita Allen, and Archie Thomson	Bella and Samuel Spewack	
November 11–22, 1953	Cyrano de Bergerac	Cyrano de Bergerac	José Ferrer	New York City Theatre Company	Edmond Rostand, translated by Brian Hooker	Adapted for Producers' Showcase in 1956
November 25 – December 6, 1953	The Shrike	Jim Downs	Joseph Kramm and José Ferrer	New York City Theatre Company	Joseph Kramm	
December 6–20, 1953	Richard III	Richard III of England	Margaret Webster	New York City Theatre Company	William Shakespeare	
December 22, 1953 – January 4, 1954	Charley's Aunt	Lord Fancourt Babberley	José Ferrer	New York City Theatre Company	Brandon Thomas	
January 5, 1954 – January 16, 1955	The Fourposter	N/A	José Ferrer	New York City Theatre Company	Jan de Hartog	
February 4 – July 19, 1958	Oh Captain!	N/A	José Ferrer	Howard Merrill and Theatre Corporation of America	Music and Lyrics by Jay Livingston and Ray Evans; Book by José Ferrer and Al Morgan	Adapted from The Captain's Paradise; Nominated – Tony Award for Best Musical
November 24 – December 13, 1958	Edwin Booth	Edwin Booth	José Ferrer	José Ferrer and The Playwrights' Company	Milton Geiger	Also understudied Ian Keith as Junius Brutus Booth
March 9–21, 1959	Juno	N/A	José Ferrer	The Playwrights' Company, Oliver Smith, and Oliver Rea	Music and Lyrics by Marc Blitzstein; Book by Joseph Stein	
December 29, 1959 – June 1, 1960	The Andersonville Trial	N/A	José Ferrer	William Darrid, Eleanore Saidenberg, and Daniel Hollywood	Saul Levitt	
December 8, 1963 – March 14, 1964	The Girl Who Came to Supper	Grand Duke Charles	Joe Layton	Herman Levin	Music and Lyrics by Noël Coward; Book by Harry Kurnitz	
November 22, 1965 – June 26, 1971	Man of La Mancha	Cervantes	Albert Marre	Albert W. Selden and Hal James	Music by Mitch Leigh; Lyrics by Joe Darion; Book by Dale Wasserman	Replacement for Richard Kiley on Broadway, May 28 – June 9, 1966; National Tour Sep 24, 1966 – Apr 09, 1967; Replacement for David Atkinson on Broadway, April 11 – July 13, 1967; Replacement for Richard Kiley on National Tour July 15 – August 7, 1967; Replacement for Richard Kiley on National Tour September 23, 1968 – September 13, 1969
March 9, 1975	A Gala Tribute to Joshua Logan	Himself	Donald Saddler	Friends of the Theatre & Music Collection of the Museum of the City of New York	N/A	
April 8–21, 1979	Carmelina	N/A	José Ferrer	Roger L. Stevens, J. W. Fisher, Joan Cullman, Jujamcyn Theaters, and Whitehead-Stevens	Music by Burton Lane; Lyrics by Alan Jay Lerner; Book by Alan Jay Lerner and Joseph Stein	
June 22, 1987	Happy Birthday, Mr. Abbott!	Himself	Fritz Holt	Barry Brown	N/A	

== Awards and nominations ==
Year	Award	Category	Nominated work	Results	Ref.
1948	Academy Awards	Best Supporting Actor	Joan of Arc	Nominated	
1950	Academy Awards	Best Actor	Cyrano de Bergerac	Won	
1952	Academy Awards	Best Actor	Moulin Rouge	Nominated	
1954	British Academy Film Awards	Best Foreign Actor	The Caine Mutiny	Nominated	
1957	Directors Guild of America Awards	Outstanding Directorial Achievement in Motion Pictures	The Great Man	Nominated	
1950	Golden Globe Awards	Best Actor in a Motion Picture – Drama	Cyrano de Bergerac	Won	
1958	Grammy Awards	Best Recording for Children	"Tubby the Tuba"	Nominated	
1950	New York Film Critics Circle Awards	Best Actor	Cyrano de Bergerac	Nominated	
1951	Primetime Emmy Awards	Best Actor		Nominated	
1956	Primetime Emmy Awards	Best Actor – Single Performance	Producers' Showcase	Nominated	
1947	Tony Awards	Best Actor in a Play	Cyrano de Bergerac	Won	
1952	Tony Awards	Best Actor in a Play	The Shrike	Won	
1952	Tony Awards	Best Director	The Fourposter / The Shrike / Stalag 17	Won	
1958	Tony Awards	Best Musical	Oh, Captain!	Nominated	

== See also ==
- List of Puerto Ricans
- French immigration to Puerto Rico
- List of Puerto Rican Academy Award winners and nominees
- Miguel Ferrer
