= The Climb (1986 film) =

1986 Canadian adventure film

- Directed by: Donald Shebib
- Written by: Donald Shebib
- Based on: Nanga Parbat Pilgrimage by Hermann Buhl
- Produced by: Colin Godman; Wendy Wacko
- Starring: Bruce Greenwood; Kenneth Welsh; Ken Pogue; Thomas Hauff
- Cinematography: Richard Leiterman
- Edited by: Ron Wiseman
- Music by: Peter Jermyn
- Production company: Wacko Productions
- Distributed by: Cineplex Odeon
- Release date: July 14, 1986
- Running time: 90 minutes
- Countries: Canada; United Kingdom
- Language: English

The Climb is a 1986 Canadian-British co-produced adventure drama film, directed by Donald Shebib. A dramatization of mountaineer Hermann Buhl's 1953 attempt to climb Nanga Parbat, the film stars Bruce Greenwood as Buhl alongside James Hurdle, Kenneth Welsh, Ken Pogue, Thomas Hauff, Guy Bannerman, David James Elliott and Tom Butler as members of his expedition.

== Release ==
The film was broadcast on British television in 1986 as part of Mountain Men, a series of three films dramatizing noteworthy historical climbing expeditions. In Canada, it was announced as screening in the Perspectives Canada program at both the 1986 Toronto International Film Festival and the 1987 Toronto International Film Festival, although it is not clear from currently available sources whether this is because the film actually screened in both years, or because the 1986 screening was cancelled and rescheduled for 1987. The film then received limited theatrical release in Canada and the United States in fall 1987.

== Awards ==
The film received two Genie Award nominations at the 9th Genie Awards in 1988, for Best Cinematography (Richard Leiterman) and Best Sound Editing (Robin Leigh, Richard Cadger, Jane Tattersall, Penny Hozy and Peter McBurnie). Leiterman received the Canadian Society of Cinematographers Feature Award for the film in 1988.
