= The Shrike (film) =

1955 film by José Ferrer

- Theatrical release poster
- Directed by: José Ferrer
- Screenplay by: Ketti Frings
- Based on: The Shrike by Joseph Kramm
- Produced by: Aaron Rosenberg
- Starring: José Ferrer; June Allyson
- Cinematography: William Daniels, A.S.C.
- Edited by: Frank Gross, A.C.E.
- Music by: Frank Skinner
- Production company: Universal International Pictures
- Distributed by: Universal Pictures
- Release date: June 16, 1955
- Running time: 88 minutes
- Country: United States
- Language: English

The Shrike is a 1955 American film noir drama film based on Joseph Kramm's play of the same name. José Ferrer directed and starred in Ketti Frings' screenplay adaptation.

== Plot ==
Successful stage director Jim Downs (Ferrer) is driven to a mental breakdown by his domineering wife Ann (June Allyson). Institutionalized, he confides in Dr. Bellman (Kendall Clark) and Dr. Barrow (Isabel Bonner), and he finds a kindred spirit in Charlotte Moore (Joy Page).

== Cast ==
- José Ferrer as Jim Downs
- June Allyson as Ann Downs
- Joy Page as Charlotte Moore
- Kendall Clark as Dr. Bellman
- Isabel Bonner as Dr. Barrow
- Will Kuluva as Ankoritis
- Joe Comadore as Major
- Billy M. Greene as Schloss
- Leigh Whipper as Mr. Carlisle
- Richard Benedict as Gregory
- Mary Bell as Miss Wingate
- Martin Newman as Carlos O'Brien
- Herbie Faye as Tager
- Somer Alberg as Dr. Schlesinger
- Jay Barney as Dr. Kramer
- Edward C. Platt as Harry Downs
- Fay Morley as Jennifer Logan
- Jacqueline de Wit as Katharine Meade

Uncredited (in order of appearance)

- Adrienne Marden as Miss Raymond
- Douglas Henderson as Burt Fielding
- Helen Beverly as Miss Thatcher
- Shawn Smith as Celia Johns
- Joanne Jordan as Miss Cardell
- Stafford Repp as Fleming
- Nancy Kulp as Mrs. Colman
- Dennis Moore as Spectator
- Tom Wilson as Actor in play
- Pauline Moore as Author's wife
- Kenneth Drake as Author
- Nicky Blair as Patient
- Sara Seegar as Mrs. Cory
- John Farrow as Englishman
- Jean Fenwick as Mrs. Ellison

== Production ==
In 1952 Ferrer announced Hal Wallis and Bill Pearlberg were both interested in filming the play.

Ferrer spent two years developing the script with Ketti Frings. For a time it seemed he might make it at RKO. In March 1953 Ferrer announced he had purchased the film rights himself.

He had discussions with Columbia. Then in February 1954 Ferrer signed a deal with Universal to finance.

"I'm terribly grateful to have been given the opportunity to star and direct", said Ferrer.

In April 1954 it was announced June Allyson would star alongside Ferrer. Allyson had never played this type of role before. "I was fed to the teeth being sweet", she said.

Filming started in September 1954. Much of the film was shot on location at Bellevue Hospital and around Times Square in New York City.

Ferrer had the film scheduled so the cast would rehearse, then shoot, then filming would stop while the cast would rehearse again, then shoot again. Frings was on set the whole time to assist Ferrer's direction.

The music score was by Frank Skinner. Ferrer composed "Conversation (The Shrike)", recorded by Pete Rugolo on his 1955 album New Sounds (Harmony HL7003). The opening title sequence was created by Saul Bass.

== Reception ==
Reviewing for The New York Times, A. H. Weiler wrote:

José Ferrer, the director and star of the play, again is portraying the Broadway director who struggles to be released from the confines of the psychiatric ward even though it means a return to a hateful marriage. And, in making his debut as a film director, Mr. Ferrer proves that he is as expert behind the camera as he is across the footlights. Since he obviously is no stranger to his source material, his performance is at once polished, powerful and moving. And many of his principals, who are re-enacting the roles they created on stage, forcefully enhance the stark vista of life in a mental ward... As our sorely beset hero relates in flashback to probing psychiatrists, it was a happy union at first, full of love and companionship. It deteriorated slowly but inexorably, as did his career, when her insatiable yearning for the life of an actress and her meddling in his affairs reached a point of no return... Backstage and hospital sequences have a documentary authenticity heightened in effect by Mr. Ferrer's portrayal. His scenes in the nightmarish world of the mental ward and his climactic session with the psychiatrists as he tearfully and desperately agrees to return to his wife, is acting of a rare order... Although The Shrike has changed its tune it still is an unusual and immensely interesting film drama.

Allyson later said her husband Dick Powell and all her advisers opposed her making the movie:

But it was a challenge I could not resist. For years I had been the Perfect... And now..., I would be far from the perfect wife. I would indeed be a monster of a wife, one of the least attractive in the history of the theater. As it turned out, the picture was a wonderful flop, but I do not regret deciding to play the vixen, Ann Downs. Other than my personal satisfaction in making my own decision, The Shrike was fun, and I even dreamed vaguely of an Academy Award.

== See also ==
- List of American films of 1955

== Sources ==
- Kramm, Joseph (1998). The Shrike (1st ed.). New York City: Dramatists Play Service. p. 3. ISBN 978-0822210269.
