= David Hovan =

Canadian artist, actor and filmmaker (born 1950)

- Born: 1950 (age 75–76); Beirut, Lebanon
- Other name: Ara Hovan
- Occupations: Artist, actor and filmmaker

David Hovan (born 1950) is a Canadian artist, actor and filmmaker.

== Biography ==
David Hovan was born in Beirut, Lebanon, in 1950, to an Armenian family. His interest for the arts led him to earn a Bachelor of Arts degree in Beirut, where he gained recognition through his participation in local theatrical productions. Thanks to a prestigious scholarship he came to the United States. In 1975 he completed his MFA in Theatre at Southern Methodist University, where he performed in leading roles for two seasons.

After moving to Vancouver, Canada, David expanded the scope of his artistic practice, achieving professional success as an actor, director, and filmmaker. His work in independent films garnered numerous accolades before he turned his attention to the fine arts. He honed his skills in abstract painting through independent study at the Emily Carr University of Art + Design and by working with private mentors.

== Stage ==
| Year | Title | Role | Theatre | Notes |
|---|---|---|---|---|
| 1976 | Hamlet | First player | Theatre Calgary, Calgary, Alberta | as Ara Hovanessian |
| 1976 | Rosencrantz & Guildenstern Are Dead | The player | Theatre Calgary, Calgary, Alberta | as Ara Hovanessian |
| 1976 | Beautiful Tigers | Pablo Picasso | Vancouver East Cultural Centre, Vancouver, British Columbia | as Ara Hovanessian |
| 1980 | The Lion and the Lark | Leo | Theatre 3, Edmonton, Alberta | as Ara Hovan |
| 1981 | Wild Oats | Lempke | Arts Club Theatre, Vancouver, British Columbia | as Ara Hovan |

== Filmography ==
=== Film ===
| Year | Title | Role | Notes |
|---|---|---|---|
| 1978 | I Miss You, Hugs and Kisses | Reporter | as Ara Hovanessian |
| 1980 | Virus | Maj. Giron | as Ara Hovanessian |
| 1981 | Threshold | Short O.R. Visitor | as Ara Hovan |
| 1984 | Hour of the Grey Horse | Vrej | as Ara Hovanessian |
| 2008 | Crime | Tula's Dad | |
| 2014 | Toastmaster | Uncle Kapriel | also associate producer |
| 2019 | Tipped | Curt Man | Short |
| 2024 | Are We Done Now? | Online Mediation Guide | |

=== Television ===
| Year | Title | Role | Notes |
|---|---|---|---|
| 1977 | The Magic Lie | | Episode: "Snatched" |
| 1977 | The New Avengers | Czibor | Episode: "Forward Base" |
| 1979 | The Littlest Hobo | | Episode: "The Defector" |
| 1979 | Spirit of Adventure | Fisherman | Episode: "Marooned in the Land God Gave to Cain" |
| 1989 | Wiseguy | Palato | Episode: "Le Lacrime D'Amore: Part 2 aka There's Plenty of Time" |
| 1989-90 | Booker | | 2 episodes |
| 1992 | The Commish | Randi | Episode: "True Believers" |
| 1992 | Lightning Force | Pilot | Episode: "Hijack" |
| 1992 | Dirty Work | Phil | Television film |
| 2012 | Alcatraz | Philharmonic Chairman | Episode: "Webb Porter" |
| 2012 | Love at the Thanksgiving Day Parade | Giano | Television film |
| 2013 | Motive | Building Super | Episode: "Pushover" |
| 2021 | Trigger Me | Meditation Guy | Episode #1.4 |
