= Who Has Seen the Wind (1977 film) =

- Directed by: Allan Winton King
- Written by: Patricia Watson
- Based on: Who Has Seen the Wind by W. O. Mitchell
- Produced by: Pierre Lamy; Allan Winton King
- Starring: Charmion King; David Gardner; Brian Painchaud; Douglas Junor; Patricia Hamilton; Gordon Pinsent; Helen Shaver; Thomas Hauff; José Ferrer
- Cinematography: Richard Leiterman
- Edited by: Arla Saare
- Music by: Eldon Rathburn
- Production companies: Allan King Associates; Souris River Films
- Distributed by: Astral Films (Canada); Janus Films (U.S.)
- Release date: October 20, 1977
- Running time: 100 minutes
- Country: Canada
- Language: English
- Budget: $1,120,000
- Box office: $1.2 million (Canada)

Who Has Seen the Wind is a 1977 Canadian drama film directed by Allan King and written by Patricia Watson. The film is an adaptation of W. O. Mitchell's influential novel Who Has Seen the Wind. It was the first narrative feature film ever directed by King, who was previously known primarily as a documentary filmmaker.

The film stars Brian Painchaud as Brian O'Connall, with a supporting cast including Douglas Junor, Patricia Hamilton, Gordon Pinsent, Helen Shaver, Chapelle Jaffe, Charmion King, Leslie Carlson, Hugh Webster and José Ferrer.

Although Painchaud received positive critical attention for his performance, it was the only film he ever made before his death in 1986.

== Synopsis ==
The story revolves around Brian (Brian Painchaud), a young boy who lives a magical life on the Canadian prairies catching prairie dogs and playing with friends. The magic ends when his father (Gordon Pinsent) falls ill, and he witnesses the harsh realities of adult life. This coming-of-age story provides a poignant look at life on the prairies during the Great Depression.

== Cast ==
- Brian Painchaud as Brian O'Connal
- Douglas Junor as The Young Ben
- Patricia Hamilton as Miss MacDonald
- Gordon Pinsent as Gerald O'Connal
- Chapelle Jaffe as Maggie O'Connal
- Nan Stewart as Mrs. MacMurray
- Helen Shaver as Ruth Thompson
- Cedric Smith as Dr. Svarich
- Lynda Laurence as Mariel (credited as Linda Leitch)
- Billy Hunter as Forbsie
- Chris Raum as Artie
- David Gardner as Reverend Powelly
- Charmion King as Mrs. Abercrombie
- Jose Ferrer as The Ben
- Ed McNamara as Saint Sammy
- Vern Brooks as Milt Palmer
- Thomas Hauff as Principal Jim Digby
- Leslie Carlson as Joe Pivott (credited as Les Carlson)
- Hugh Webster as Ab
- Sandy Webster as Judge Mortimer
- Ches Robertson as Mayor Neally
- Frank Scherr as Ed Harris
- Gerard Parkes as Uncle Sean
- J. Vernon Buller as Jake Harris
- Susan Wowk as Annie
- Ed Yee as Wong
- Litty Meikle as Mrs. Ben
- Cinthia Yee as Tang
- William Fung as Voole
- Michael Peters as Bobbie
- William Hubbard as Mr. Abercrombie

== Production ==
The film was in development from 1972 and was the first major Canadian classic book to be filmed.

W. O. Mitchell was paid $11,000 (equivalent to $53,756 in 2025) for the film rights to Who Has Seen the Wind. The film was shot in from 30 August to 15 October 1976, on a budget of $1,120,000 (equivalent to $5,913,312 in 2025) and $300,000 (equivalent to $1,583,923 in 2025) of the film's budget came from the Saskatchewan government. $300,000 of the budget also came from the Canadian Film Development Corporation and $100,000 from Famous Players theatres, with the remainder from private sources.

== Release ==
The film was released in Arcola, Saskatchewan, on 20 October 1977, and was distributed by Astral Films in Canada and Janus Films in the United States.

== Reception ==
The film was awarded the Academy of Canadian Cinema and Television's Golden Reel Award in 1978 as the top-grossing Canadian film of the previous year, with a gross of $1.2 million. It was nominated for a Gold Hugo (Best Feature) at the 1978 Chicago International Film Festival.

== Works cited ==
- Melnyk, George (2004). One Hundred Years of Canadian Cinema. University of Toronto Press. ISBN 080203568X.
- Turner, D. John, ed. (1987). Canadian Feature Film Index: 1913-1985. Canadian Film Institute. ISBN 0660533642.
