= Order to Kill =

1975 film by José Gutiérrez Maesso

- Italian film poster
- Directed by: José Gutiérrez Maesso
- Screenplay by: Massimo De Rita; Arduino Maiuri; Santiago Moncada; Eugenio Martín; José Gutiérrez Maesso
- Story by: Massimo De Rita; Arduino Maiuri; Santiago Moncada; Eugenio Martín; José Gutiérrez Maesso
- Produced by: José Gutiérrez Maesso
- Cinematography: Aiace Parolin
- Edited by: Angel Serrano
- Music by: Adolfo Waitzman
- Production companies: Tecisa; B.R.C. Produzione Film; FRAL
- Distributed by: Variety Distribution
- Release date: August 31, 1974 (Italy)
- Countries: Spain; Italy; Dominican Republic
- Box office: ₤360.6 million

Order to Kill (Spanish: El clan de los inmorales, Italian: La testa del serpente) is a 1974 Spanish-Italian crime-action film written and directed by José Gutiérrez Maesso. In the movie the police inspector (José Ferrer) offers passports to a hit man (Helmut Berger) and his girlfriend (Sydne Rome) if the hit man kills a mob boss.

== Cast ==
- Helmut Berger – Clyde Hart
- Sydne Rome – Anne
- Kevin McCarthy – Ed McLean
- José Ferrer – Detective Reed
- José María Caffarel – Richard
- Howard Ross – Richard
- Manuel Zarzo – Hugo
- Juan Luis Galiardo
- Álvaro de Luna – Daniel

== Production ==
Eugenio Martín minimized his contributions to the script in the film, stating that it was "It was Maesso's project, and Moncada and I were to write it. However, there was no way we could come up with a good plot, so we soon called ourselves out. Maesso did not give up, though, and he called and Italian screenwriter to do the job" When the film was finished, Maesso credited both Moncada and Martin for their work on the film, but Martin stated that he probably did not use much of it.

== Release ==
Order to Kill was released in Italy on August 31, 1974. In Italy, the film grossed a total of 360,601,000 lire.

== Reception ==
In his book Italian Crime Filmography 1968–1980, Roberto Curti referred to the film as a "tiresome variation on the classic theme of a lonely man's vengeance, notable mainly for a script that in the second part predates Enzo G Castellari's powerful The Big Racket" and that actor Helmut Berger "is given little to do with the clichéd character".

== Notes ==
=== References ===
- Curti, Roberto (2013). Italian Crime Filmography, 1968-1980. McFarland. ISBN 978-0786469765.
