= Brethren (film) =

- Directed by: Dennis Zahoruk
- Written by: Dennis Zahoruk
- Produced by: Chalmers Adams; Dennis Zahoruk
- Starring: Thomas Hauff; Kenneth Welsh
- Cinematography: David M. Ostriker
- Edited by: Dennis Zahoruk
- Release date: 1976
- Running time: 91 minutes
- Country: Canada
- Language: English

Brethren is a Canadian drama film, directed by Dennis Zahoruk and released in 1976. The film centres on three estranged adult brothers returning to their small hometown to attend the funeral of their abusive and unloving father.

The film stars Thomas Hauff, Kenneth Welsh, Richard Fitzpatrick, Candace O'Connor and Sandra Scott.

It was a Canadian Film Award nominee for Best Picture at the 27th Canadian Film Awards. Zahoruk was awarded a Special Jury Prize in recognition of directing his first feature film.

The film was subsequently broadcast on television in 1977.
