= A Married Couple (1969 film) =

1969 Canadian documentary film

- Directed by: Allan King
- Produced by: Allan King
- Cinematography: Richard Leiterman
- Edited by: Arla Saare
- Music by: Douglas Bush; Zal Yanofsky
- Production company: Allan King Associates
- Distributed by: Aquarius Films
- Release date: November 6, 1969
- Running time: 97 minutes
- Country: Canada
- Language: English
- Budget: $203,000

A Married Couple is a Canadian documentary film, directed by Allan King and released in 1969. The film is a cinema vérité portrait of Billy and Antoinette Edwards, a married couple living in Toronto, Ontario.

== Production ==
Billy Edwards, the son of Royal Canadian Air Force officer Harold Edwards, was an advertising executive who had helped to design the poster for King's 1967 film Warrendale. Sensing trouble in his friend's marriage and wanting to make a film about marital conflict, King convinced the Edwards to allow their home life to be filmed for ten weeks by cinematographer Richard Leiterman and sound technician Chris Wangler; however, to ensure that his presence did not accidentally distract Billy and Antoinette Edwards from behaving naturally, King himself did not enter their house at all and "directed" the film only when editing the footage after each day's shooting. The film had a budget of $203,000 (equivalent to $1,692,010 in 2025).

== Distribution ==
The film faced some difficulties with the Ontario Censor Board. The board unexpectedly permitted a skinny dipping scene to remain in the film, but insisted that four of the film's 32 uses of the word "fuck" had to be cut from the dialogue.

The film premiered in Toronto on November 6, 1969.

The film was selected as Canada's official submission to the 1970 Cannes Film Festival. It was not selected for competition, but was screened in the Directors' Fortnight program.

== Response ==
The film is considered a landmark documentary and one of King's most significant films, although it received a mixed response from critics at the time.

Vincent Canby of The New York Times wrote that "What King ultimately proves, I think, is that something that is neither fact nor fiction is less meta-truth than sophisticated sideshow. As I've never believed there is a novel in everybody, nor even a tape-recorded book, I now am convinced there are probably very few people worthy of being the subjects of an actuality drama. Better than any other instrument, perhaps, the documentary camera can capture the sense and feeling of events, of social climates, and even of people in public crisis, but meaningful private drama must always elude it since the camera is stopped by what Arthur Miller once called 'the wall of the skin'."

Time wrote that the film "in its utter nakedness, makes John Cassavetes’s Faces look like early Doris Day."

== Legacy ==
The film led Billy and Antoinette to decide to have a second child, although they divorced by 1972.

The film was screened at the 1984 Festival of Festivals as part of Front & Centre, a special retrospective program highlighting selected films from throughout the history of Canadian cinema. In 2017 it was included in Canada On Screen, a special program highlighting 150 landmarks from Canadian film history as part of Canada 150.

== Works cited ==
- Melnyk, George (2004). One Hundred Years of Canadian Cinema. University of Toronto Press. ISBN 0802084443.
