= Thomas Hauff =

Austrian-born Canadian actor

Thomas Hauff is an Austrian-born Canadian actor. He is most noted for his performance in the 1979 film Summer's Children, for which he received a Genie Award nomination for Best Actor at the 1st Genie Awards in 1980.

Predominantly a stage actor, his noted theatre roles have included Jack MacNeill in Margaret Hollingsworth's War Babies, Bram Shipley in James Nichol's stage adaptation of Margaret Laurence's The Stone Angel, MacDonald in Anne Chislett's Glengarry School Days, Matthew Cuthbert in Paul Ledoux's adaptation of Lucy Maud Montgomery's Anne of Green Gables, Lord Capulet in Romeo and Juliet, and Angus in Michael Healey's The Drawer Boy.

He also had roles in the films Brethren, Who Has Seen the Wind, Silence of the North, The Climb, Cowboys Don't Cry and Away from Her.

== Filmography ==
=== Film ===
Year	Title	Role	Notes
1974	Christina	Boy	
1977	Who Has Seen the Wind	Principal Jim Digby	
1979	Summer's Children	Steve	
1979	Dogpound Shuffle	Sailor	
1981	Silence of the North	Billy	
1982	Murder by Phone	Repairman	
1986	The Climb	Kuno Rainer	
1988	Cowboys Don't Cry	Roger Sutherland	
1989	Millennium	Ron Kennedy	
1990	Thick as Thieves	Billings	
1991	True Colors	Detective	
1994	April One	Jerry Brownstein	
1994	Spike of Love	Flloyd	
1996	Mother Night	SS Officer	
1997	Time to Say Goodbye?	Judge McKinistry	
2000	Left Behind: The Movie	Steve Plank	
2003	How to Deal	Minister	
2006	Away from Her	William Hart	
2008	Adoration	Nick	
2009	Amelia	Man at Opera House	
2012	Stories We Tell	Actor (The Caretaker)	
2012	Malody	Chef	
2013	I'll Follow You Down	Professor	
2017	Molly's Game	Mr. Sernovitz	
2019	Guest of Honour	Heinz	

=== Television ===
Year	Title	Role	Notes
1971	D.A.: Conspiracy to Kill	Walter Gibson	Television film
1971	The Deadly Hunt	Danny	Television film
1974	Dr. Simon Locke	Andy	Episode: "The Vanishing"
1977	Brethren	Jed	Television film
1979	The Great Detective	Dodge	2 episodes
1980	The Littlest Hobo	Dog Catcher #2	2 episodes
1983	As You Like It	1st Forest Lord	Television film
1985	My Father, My Rival	Phillip	Television film
1985–1986	The Edison Twins	Mr. Bulgar	3 episodes
1985–1988	Night Heat	Newscaster	14 episodes
1986	C.A.T. Squad	Nolan	Television film
1986	Unnatural Causes	Sloan	Television film
1987–1990	Friday the 13th: The Series	Various roles	3 episodes
1988	The Ann Jillian Story	Dr. William Edelman	Television film
1988	The Campbells	Mr. Bingham	Episode: "Bingham's Gold"
1988	9B	Hugo Palmer-Jones	5 episodes
1989	War of the Worlds	Colonel Manning	Episode: "The Raising of Lazarus"
1990	E.N.G.	Urich	Episode: "Traitors All"
1991	In the Nick of Time	Figgus	Television film
1992	To Catch a Killer	Foreman Hendricks	Miniseries
1992	Street Legal	Sparky Henderson	Episode: "Breach of Trust"
1992	The Good Fight	Emery	Television film
1993	Gregory K	Court Clerk	Television film
1993	Gross Misconduct: The Life of Brian Spencer	Pat's Coach	Television film
1995	TekWar	Ian	Episode: "Deep Cover"
1997	A Prayer in the Dark	Ray McGarth	Television film
1997	When Secrets Kill	Frank Emery	Television film
1998	Universal Soldier III: Unfinished Business	General Clancy / GR86	Television film
1999, 2000	Wind at My Back	Benjamin Kendrick	2 episodes
2000	Cheaters	Marconi Reporter #2	Television film
2002	A Season on the Brink	Ed Williams	Television film
2002	Trackers	Dr. Patterson	Episode: "Dark Road Home"
2002	Lucky Day	Mr. Igus	Television film
2002	Mutant X	Zander Delassandro	Episode: "Crossroads of the Soul"
2002, 2004	Queer as Folk	Mr. Brown	2 episodes
2003	Sue Thomas: F.B.Eye	Sue	Episode: "The Heist"
2003	Blue Murder	Reg Turner	Episode: "Full Disclosure"
2003	DC 9/11: Time of Crisis	John McCain	Television film
2010	Bloodletting & Miraculous Cures	Priest	Episode: "Complications"
2010	The Wild Girl	Mayor Cargill	Television film
2011	The Listener	Lutier	Episode: "Crime Seen"
2015	Rookie Blue	Bradley Billings	Episode: "Best Man"
2016, 2018	Air Crash Investigation	Pilot Reinwald	2 episodes
2017	Conviction	Man / Judge Shore	Episode: "Past, Prologue & What's to Come"
2017	The Handmaid's Tale	Judge	Episode: "Late"
2019	The Boys	Pastor	Episode: "Good for the Soul"
2022	Great Performances	Maurice	Episode: "Sarah"
