= Old Explorers =

- Directed by: Bill Pohlad
- Written by: Bill Pohlad
- Based on: Old Explorers by: James Cada; Mark Keller
- Produced by: David Herbert; Tom Jenz; Bill Pohlad
- Starring: José Ferrer; James Whitmore
- Cinematography: Jeffrey Laszlo
- Edited by: Miroslav Janek
- Music by: Billy Barber
- Production company: Old Explorers Limited Partnership
- Distributed by: Taurus Entertainment Company
- Release date: September 28, 1990 (Minneapolis)
- Running time: 100 minutes
- Country: United States
- Language: English

Old Explorers is a 1990 American drama film directed by Bill Pohlad and adapted from a stage play of the same name by James Cada and Mark Keller. It stars José Ferrer and James Whitmore as two seniors who dream up fantastical adventures. The film was Ferrer’s final film role.

== Plot ==
Warner Watney and Leinen Roth are two retired widowers and friends. Watney lives with his adult son Alex, daughter-in-law Leslie and their growing family, but may soon be going to live at an old-age home. Leinen lives alone in an apartment. The two friends cope with their old age and physical disabilities by getting together and imagining fantastical adventures in search of exotic locales such as Atlantis, the Shangri-La in the Himalayan Mountains, and the Bermuda Triangle. After Leinen survives a stroke, the pair set off on a real-life adventure, joining a tugboat sailing down the Mississippi River to New Orleans.

== Cast ==
- José Ferrer as Warner Watney
- James Whitmore as Leinen Roth
- Jeffrey Gadbois as Alex Watney
- Caroline Kaiser as Leslie Watney
- William Warfield as tugboat captain

== Reception ==
Kevin Thomas of the Los Angeles Times praised the performances of the two lead actors and said, "Individually and especially together, Ferrer and Whitmore are a treat, with the dry humor of Ferrer’s character contrasting amusingly with his more conservative friend." Thomas critiqued the film’s transition from stage to screen and said "the poignance Ferrer and Whitmore generate is undercut by the tedium of talky stretches of theatrical dialogue." He concluded, "There’s no denying, however, that 'Old Explorers' certainly drives home the plight of the aged in our society and that its heroes’ flights of fancy underline the true state of isolation, neglect and lack of respect so frequently accorded even to alert and affluent older Americans." TV Guide said, "Directed by William M. Pohlad, mostly as a two-character study, 'Old Explorers' says something touching about the quietly growing terror of old age and the use of childlike imagination to--if only momentarily--forestall it, but it gets lost in the listless, paper-thin adventure sequences, filmed in Arizona and Florida."
