= Isabel Bonner =

American stage actress

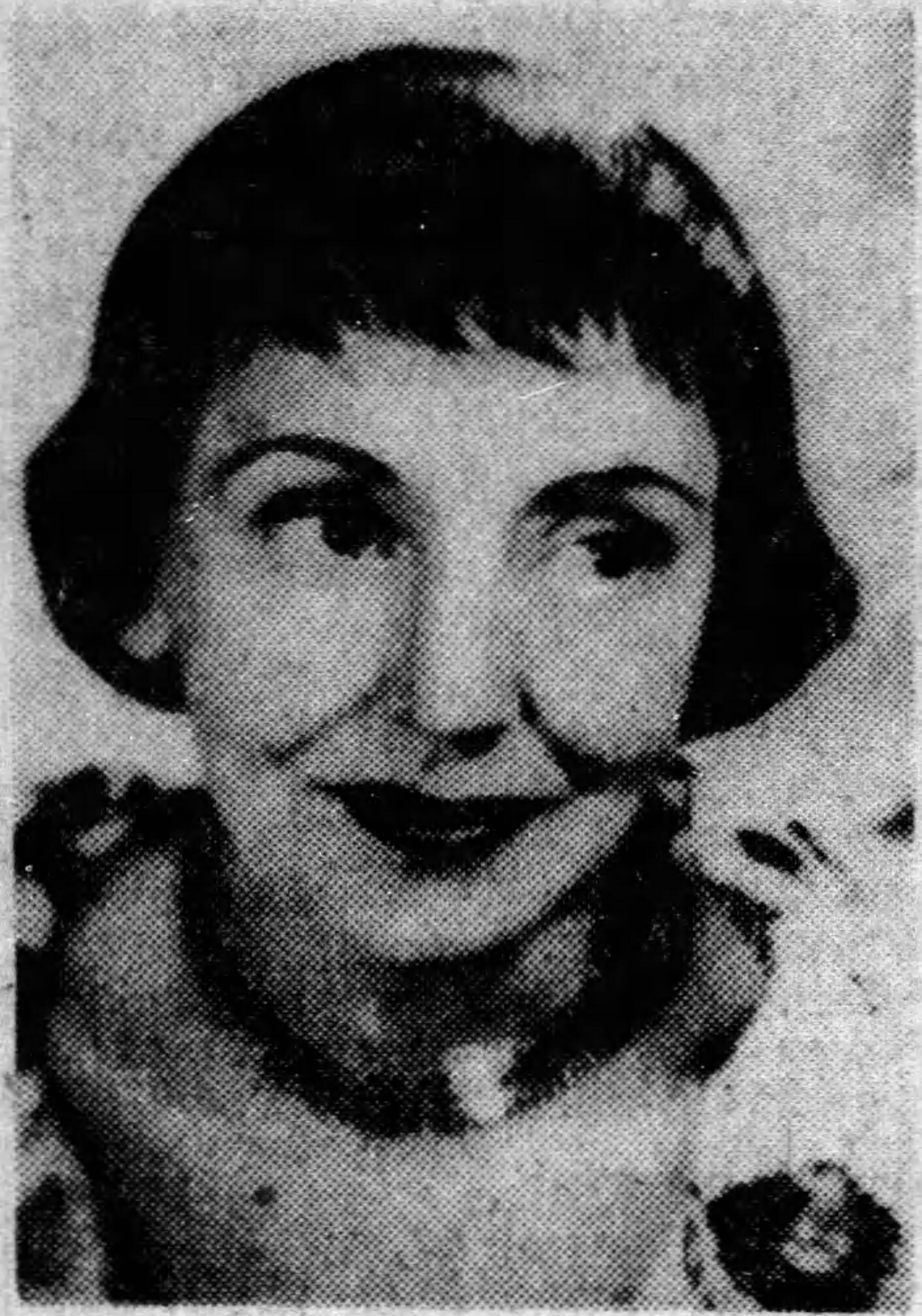
- Bonner in c. 1955
- Born: June 12, 1907; Pittsburgh, Pennsylvania, U.S.
- Died: July 1, 1955 (aged 48); Los Angeles, California, U.S.
- Occupation: Actress
- Years active: 1935–1955 (Broadway)
- Spouse: Joseph Kramm

Isabel Bonner (June 12, 1907 – July 1, 1955) was an American stage actress.

== Biography ==
Bonner was born on June 12, 1907, in Pittsburgh, Pennsylvania. As a child, she began her career in her father's stock company. She later studied in New York under Alex Koiransky and Maria Ouspenskaya, and made her Broadway debut as the ingénue in Let Freedom Ring. She had several later theatre roles, including parts in Processional, Trojan Incident, Uncle Harry, Liliom, Medicine Show, Laura, Foolish Nation, The Front Page, and The Biggest Thief in Town. She also had some roles in television productions, such as Suspense and The Philco Television Playhouse, and in the radio serials Nora Drake and The Right to Happiness.

She played roles multiple times in The Shrike, a drama play written by her husband, Joseph Kramm. She first portrayed Dr. Barrow, a psychiatrist, during its Broadway debut in 1952. Then, when the show went on an extended tour of the east, she played the wife of the male lead, who was portrayed by Dane Clark. In 1955, she took the role of the wife again in a four-week run at the Carthay Circle Theatre in Los Angeles, California.

On July 1, 1955, while performing a scene in the play that took place in a hospital, she collapsed on a bed, having died of a cerebral hemorrhage. Clark, ad-libbing, put his arm around Bonner and said "Ann, speak to me. Is something the matter? What's wrong, darling? I love you." Then, realizing something was wrong, he turned to the wings and said "Bring down the curtain." A film editor in the audience, Harold Cornsweet, later said of the ad-libbed scene: "It was so realistic that people in the audience were crying." Bonner's funeral service was held on July 7, 1955, at the Church of the Transfiguration, Episcopal in Manhattan, New York City. Bonner appeared in the 1955 film adaptation of The Shrike, released after her death, as Dr. Barrow.
