= The Shrike (play) =

1952 play written by Joseph Kramm

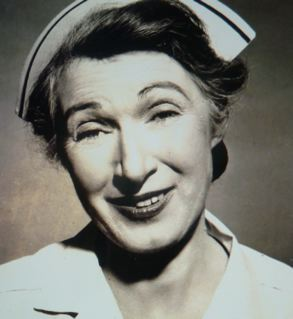
- Mary Bell as Nurse Wingate
- Original language: English
- Written by: Joseph Kramm
- Characters: Ann Downs; Jim Downs; Dr. Schlesinger; Perkins; Nurse Wingate; Dr. Barrow; Grossberg; Dr. Bellman; Joe Major
- Subject
- Genre: Drama
- Setting: a hospital

Premiere
- Date: January 15, 1952
- Place: Cort Theater; New York City

The Shrike is a play written by American dramatist Joseph Kramm. The play won the 1952 Pulitzer Prize for Drama.

== Plot ==
The play, set in the mental ward of a city hospital, revolves around a theatrical director named Jim Downs, who has been driven to the verge of insanity and suicide by his estranged wife Ann.

To outsiders, Ann seems to epitomize sweetness, kindness and graciousness. In reality, she is a bitter, manipulative shrew. Like the shrike, a small predatory bird that kills and impales its prey, Ann seems harmless but her coercion of Jim incapacitates his free will and traps him under her control.

Ann married Jim in hopes that he eventually would gain wealth and stardom, and so his lack of success galls her. Her mockery and nagging led Jim to a suicide attempt when he swallowed a bottle of sleeping pills. The play opens with Jim's being admitted to the hospital, where doctors manage to save his life. Upon waking, Jim discovers that he is legally trapped in the hospital because the psychiatrists deem him a threat to himself and others and are unwilling to release him.

Ann regularly visits Jim at the hospital, supposedly to provide comfort and love, but really to continue her hectoring and manipulation of him. She is able to charm the doctors, who usually accede to her wishes and follow her advice as to what is best for Jim.

Jim comes to realize that the only way to secure his freedom is by cooperating with Ann, who has exploited the situation to regain power over her husband. In the end, Jim is released into Ann's care, thus moving from one type of prison to another.

== Original production ==
It was Kramm's ninth play but his first professionally produced one.

José Ferrer was attached to the project in June 1950. It was going to be produced by Jed Harris, then Aldirch and Myers, and Ferrer decided to produce it.

The Shrike premiered on Broadway at the Cort Theater on January 15, 1952 and closed on May 31, 1952 after 161 performances. José Ferrer was the producer, director and star (as Jim Downs). The cast featured Judith Evelyn (Ann Downs), Somer Alberg (Dr. Schlesinger), James Hawthorne Bay (Perkins), and Mary Bell (Miss Wingate). Ferrer could only make a limited engagement because he was needed for Moulin Rouge.

The New York Times called it "a plausible melodrama that is likely to scare the living daylights out of you."

=== Awards ===
Kramm received the 1952 Pulitzer Prize for Drama.

José Ferrer won the 1952 Tony Award, Actor in a Play and Direction.

=== Revivals ===
The play was revived on Broadway at New York City Center, running from November 25, 1953 to December 6, 1953. Ferrer and Kramm directed, and Ferrer and Judith Evelyn starred.

Van Heflin toured in the play.

In a 1955 production starring Dane Clark, actress Isabel Bonner, who was married to the author, died during a performance on stage of a brain hemorrhage.

== Film adaptation ==
The play was adapted for a 1955 film starring José Ferrer and June Allyson.
