= Joseph Kramm =

American playwright, actor and director (1907–1992)

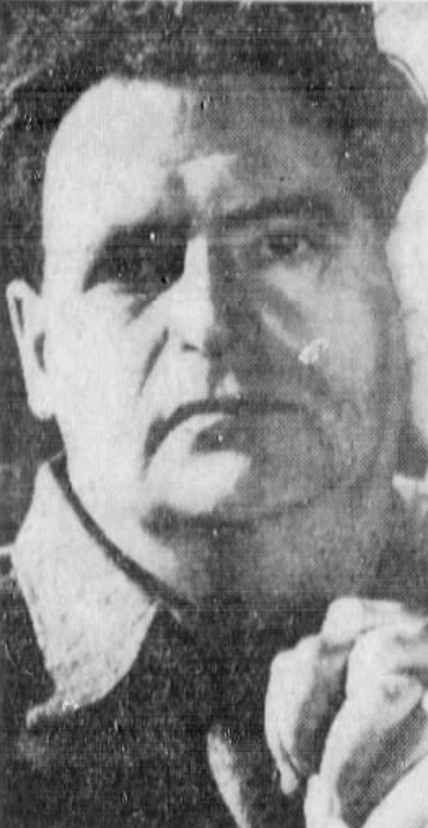
Joseph Kramm in 1952 AP wire photo

Joseph A. Kramm (September 30, 1907 – May 8, 1991) was an American playwright, actor, and director. He received the Pulitzer Prize for Drama in 1952 for his play The Shrike, later adapted into a motion picture of the same title in 1955. His wife, stage actress Isabel Bonner, died of a brain hemorrhage while performing his play in 1955.

== Works ==
=== Plays ===
- The Cry of the Watchman (1947)
- The Shrike (November 25, 1953 - December 6, 1953, revived January 15, 1952 - May 31, 1952)
- Build With One Hand (1956)
- Giants, Sons of Giants (Jan. 6–13, 1962)
