= Who Has Seen the Wind (novel) =

1947 novel by W.O. Mitchell

- Author: W. O. Mitchell
- Set in: Saskatchewan
- Published: 1947
- Publisher: Macmillan of Canada

Who Has Seen the Wind is a novel written by Canadian author W. O. Mitchell, who took the title from a famous poem by Christina Rossetti. It was first published in 1947 and has sold close to 1 million copies in Canada. Who Has Seen the Wind is considered to be Mitchell's best known work and is taught in a number of Canadian schools and universities. Quill & Quire listed Who Has Seen the Wind at number 7 on their list of the top 40 Canadian novels of the 20th century.

== Background ==
Who Has Seen the Wind tells the story of young Brian O'Connal growing up in the 1930s on the Saskatchewan prairies. Broken into four parts covering different times in young Brian's life, the novel shows Brian struggling to come to terms with issues of life and death on the Canadian prairies. In Mitchell's own preface he clearly explains the central theme of the book when he states, "I have tried to present sympathetically the struggle of a boy to understand...the ultimate meaning of the cycle of life. To him are revealed in moments of fleeting vision the realities of birth, hunger, satiety, eternity, death. They are moments when an inquiring heart seeks finality, and the chain of darkness is broken."

== Adaptations ==
A movie adaptation of the book was released in 1977 and starred Brian Painchaud, Gordon Pinsent and Helen Shaver. The book was also translated into French in 1974. Additionally, in the Opening Ceremony of the 2010 Winter Olympics in Vancouver a quote from this work was read by Donald Sutherland.

== Translation ==
- (in German) Abstract: Die Eule und die Bens. (The owl and the Ben's) transl. Walter E. Riedel, in: Kanadische Erzähler der Gegenwart. Manesse, Zurich 1967, pp 359 – 376
