= Patricia Watson =

Canadian filmmaker

- Born: March 12, 1930; Toronto, Ontario, Canada
- Died: February 13, 2015 (aged 84)
- Occupations: Director, screenwriter, producer

Patricia Watson (March 12, 1930 – February 13, 2015) was an award-winning Canadian filmmaker. She wrote, directed and produced numerous films and documentaries such as The Invention of the Adolescent (1967) and The Legacy of Mary McEwan (1987) which were her most well known and significant films.

== Background ==
Patricia Watson was born in Toronto, Ontario, Canada on March 12, 1930. She obtained a Bachelor of Arts in History and Modern Languages from the University of Toronto From 1970-1987 Watson was married to film director Allan King, during this time she worked alongside Allan King, directing, producing and writing films that were watched throughout North America. Watson had two children, Sasha and Maggie King and one step daughter, Anna King. On February 13, 2015, due to declining health, Watson died.

== Career ==
Watson began her career at The National Film Board in Montreal, starting in the 1950s as a screenwriter. In the late 70s, with the help of her friend and producer, Babs Church, Watson created many documentaries on controversial topics such as immigration and adoption. In the film industry, she was known for her unique use of symbolism which was first noticed in her film The invention of the Adolescent, as described by Brian J. Lowe, "In The Invention of the Adolescent (1967), [Patricia] Watson devised a clever argument based, in part, upon Philippe Ariès' popular history of the family, Centuries of Childhood (1962) and also upon her personal fascination with the chain-link fence surrounding school grounds as both a physical and metaphorical barrier -- a barrier that segregated children, adolescents in particular, from their historically 'normal' participation in adult social affairs." Her films also stood out through her incorporation of feminism in many of her documentaries and her interesting ways of portraying characters, for example The Legacy of Mary McEwan is described in a review by John Hasslett Cuff, "The most frustrating aspect of tonight's otherwise intriguing documentary about feminist psychiatrist Mary McEwan, is the absence of the woman herself. In the NFB production, The Legacy of Mary McEwan (Vision TV at 8 and 11), she appears only briefly at the beginning and near the end. This is not a criticism of producer/director Patricia Watson; the film is actually a testimonial to McEwan, who died in 1985. But the seven women interviewed, who were her patients and friends, speak with such emotion and affection and reveal so many tantalizing glimpses of this fascinating woman, that the viewer is curious to experience something of the paragon herself." Aside from films, Watson also wrote the short story, My Husbands Wedding, and had some of her art work featured at the Heliconian Club.

== Filmography ==
- The Purse (1966) - director, writer
- The Summer we Moved to Elm Street (1966) - director, writer
- The Invention of the Adolescent (1967) - director
- The Admittance (1968) - director, writer
- Who Has Seen the Wind (1977) - writer
- The Best Time of my Life: Portraits of Women in Mid-life (1985) - director, producer
- The Legacy of Mary McEwan (1987) - director, producer

== Awards ==
1969: International Children’s Film Festival, La Plata Argentina (For The Invention of the Adolescent)

1969: The American Film and Video Festival, New York (For The Invention of the Adolescent)

1970: International Educational Film Festival, Tehran, Iran (For The Invention of the Adolescent)

Golden Reel Award (For Who Has Seen the Wind)

Grand Prix at the Paris International Film Festival (For Who Has Seen the Wind)
