= The Magic Lie =

- Presented by: W. O. Mitchell
- Country of origin: Canada
- No. of seasons: 3

Production
- Running time: 30 minutes

Original release
- Network: CBC Television
- Release: January 26, 1977 – March 28, 1979

The Magic Lie is a CBC television anthology from 1977 to 1979. Host W. O. Mitchell gave a strange introduction promoting automatic writing.

The stories anthologized included The Infinite Worlds Of Maybe by Lester del Rey, A Horse For Running Buffalo, adapted by Frank Adamson from a story by Madeline Freeman; Boy On Defence, written by Scott Young; Snatched, from a book by Richard Parker; Aunt Mary's Visit, from Victoria Case's story; Tunnels Of Terror, adapted by Frank Moher from Patricia Clyne's novel; Mr. Noah And The Second Flood from the book by Sheila Burnford; No Way Of Telling, from a story by Emma Smith; Buckskin And Chapperos, based on Paddy Campbell's play, Shantymen Of Cache Lake by Bill Freeman, Starbuck Valley Winter by Roderick Langmere Haig-Brown, The Great Chief Maskepetoon by Kerry Wood, The Marrow of the World by Ruth Nichols, Emily of New Moon by Lucy Maud Montgomery, Trouble in the Jungle by J.R. Townsend, and A Bird in the House by Margaret Laurence.
