= Richard Leiterman =

Canadian cinematographer

- Born: March 7, 1935; South Porcupine, Ontario, Canada
- Died: July 14, 2005 (aged 70); Vancouver, British Columbia, Canada

Richard Leiterman (March 7, 1935 – July 14, 2005) was a Canadian cinematographer, best known for documentary and feature film work in the 1960s and 1970s. His cinéma vérité, or direct camera, style helped define Canadian cinema at the time.

== Biography ==
=== Early life ===
Leiterman was born in the small town of South Porcupine in northern Ontario in 1935; his brother was film producer Douglas Leiterman. He grew up in Vancouver, where he spent his young years working as a waste collector, beachcomber and truck driver. During his mid-20s, he was encouraged by his brother-in-law, Allan King, to take a camera technician course at the University of British Columbia.

=== Career ===
Leiterman took to the film camera like a natural. He sold his car to buy a 16mm camera, and proceeded to shoot stock footage, which he then sold to Canadian broadcasters like the CBC. Hired by Allan King as a second camera operator on a documentary, Leiterman went to London and, in 1962, co-founded Allan King Associates with him. The company focused on news-related filmmaking. In 1963, Leiterman went to the Southern U.S. to shoot One More River, a look at racism in America. Over the next few years, his documentary work took him around the world.

In 1969, Leiterman shot the Allan King-produced A Married Couple, which was featured at the Director's Fortnight at the 1970 Cannes Film Festival. Leiterman next began a series of collaborations with famed Canadian director Donald Shebib, starting with the Canadian classic Goin' Down the Road (1970), and followed by Between Friends (1973) and Wedding in White (1972). Leiterman used his documentary experience to provide a cinéma vérité look to his work.

Leiterman continued to shoot a variety of material over the following three decades, from Canadian features such as My American Cousin (1985) to American made-for-TV movies such as Stephen King's It (1990). His cinematography work earned him a Canadian Film Award (1975) a Genie Award, (1981), and the Kodak New Century Award (2000).

During the late 1990s, Leiterman shot the Canadian TV series Cold Squad. He taught cinematography for a brief time in the Advanced Television and Film program and Media Arts program at Sheridan College in Oakville, Ontario, then finally retired.

== Death ==
Leiterman died in Vancouver on July 14, 2005, at age 70 due to complications from a rare disease called amyloidosis.
