= Allan King =

Canadian film director (1930–2009)

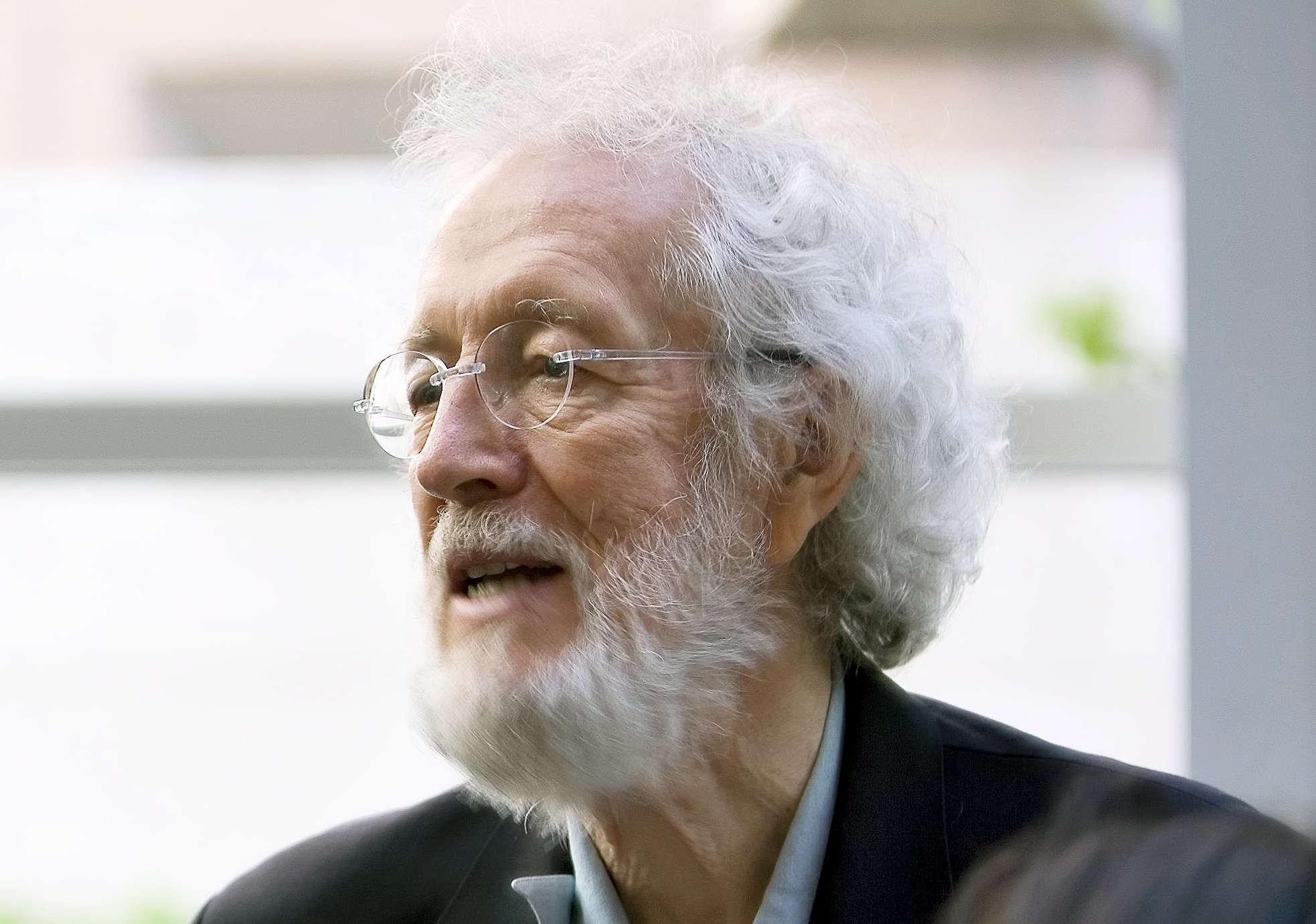
- Born: Allan Winton King; February 6, 1930; Vancouver, British Columbia, Canada
- Died: June 15, 2009 (aged 79); Toronto, Ontario, Canada
- Occupations: Film director Film producer
- Years active: 1956 – 2006
- Spouses: Phyllis Leiterman (1952-before 1970); Patricia Watson (1970-before 1987); Colleen Murphy (1987–2009)
- Awards: Order of Canada

Allan Winton King, OC (February 6, 1930 – June 15, 2009), was a Canadian film director.

== Life ==
Born in Vancouver, British Columbia, during the Great Depression, King attended Henry Hudson Elementary School, in Kitsilano.

With documentary filmmakers Don Haig and Beryl Fox, King was a partner in Film Arts, a Toronto-based post-production company that worked on their film projects and the television series This Hour Has Seven Days, The National Dream and W5.

In 2002, he was made an Officer of the Order of Canada. Ten of King's films were released as a collection representing various stages of his life. King's work was also the focus of a retrospective at the 2002 Toronto International Film Festival. In 2007 New York City's Museum of Modern Art hosted a retrospective of his work. In 2009, there were similar tributes to King's work at Vancouver's Pacific Cinematheque and the Vancouver International Film Centre.

King married three times: first to Phyllis Leiterman in 1952, then to screenwriter Patricia Watson in 1970, and finally to screenwriter Colleen Murphy in 1987. He collaborated with both Watson and Murphy on film projects. He wrote Who Has Seen the Wind with Watson in 1976 and directed Murphy's screenplay for Termini Station in 1989.

== Pre-eminent documentarian ==
For his films, King used the documentary technique cinema-verite. He ran Allan King Films Limited in Toronto. King described his style as "actuality drama – filming the drama of everyday life as it happens, spontaneously without direction, interviews or narrative." He said that he wanted to "serve the action as unobtrusively as possible" by becoming very familiar with both the environment and the people he filmed by paying particular attention to movement patterns, routines, and light quality.

== Warrendale ==
Warrendale was a film about emotionally-disturbed children who lived in a Toronto institution with the same name. Warrendale used an experimental "holding" technique of safely restraining children who lost control because of fear, rage, or grief. The therapy was designed to push children to verbalize their emotions so that they would learn to identify and deal with their emotions, and it was also supposed to replace drugs or other techniques. The film was not an exposé of holding and neither chastised nor applauded the school's approach, but it was instead an absorbing, empathetic glimpse of children in distress.

Unlike Frederick Wiseman, who spent only a short time exploring an institution before he began filming, King spent much time with subjects beforehand so that he would develop trust with his subjects. King spent four weeks at Warrendale with 12 children and another two weeks there with his camera crew before filming began.

The Canadian Broadcasting Corporation, which commissioned the film, refused to show it because the children often swore and uttered such words as "fuck" and "bullshit," which were not then permitted on Canadian television. Instead, it allowed King to show the film in cinemas. Shown in the Parallel Section at the Cannes Film Festival in 1967, the film won the Prix d'art et d'essai and also shared BAFTA's Best Foreign Film Award with Michaelangelo Antonioni's Blowup and the New York Critics' Circle Award (1968) with Luis Buñuel's Belle de Jour.

== A Married Couple ==
Despite censorship, King continued to push cultural taboos. In 1969, he directed A Married Couple, which explored a crisis in a real marriage and the issue of choice. The New York Times ' critic Clive Barnes described A Married Couple as "quite simply one of the best films I have ever seen." The film was issued by the Criterion Collection in a set titled Eclipse series 24: The Actuality Dramas of Allan King.

== Other genres ==
During more than 50 years of filmmaking, King worked in every film genre except animation, creating an enormous and diverse portfolio. To support his documentaries, King also directed episodic television and feature films. His first dramatic feature film, Who Has Seen the Wind (1976), based on the novel by W. O. Mitchell, won the Grand Prix at the Paris International Film Festival and the Golden Reel Award for the highest-grossing Canadian film of the year. Many television dramas that he directed won top awards.

In 2003, he produced Dying at Grace, a documentary about five people in their final days at the Palliative Care Unit of the Salvation Army Toronto Grace Health Centre as they came to terms with their deaths. It won awards at film festivals in Toronto and Berlin.

== Death ==
King died from brain cancer on June 15, 2009, at 79, in his home in Toronto.

== Filmography ==
=== Films and telefilms ===
- Skid Row (1956)
- The Pemberton Valley (1957)
- Rickshaw (1960) (TV)
- Interview with Orson Welles (1960) (TV)
- A Matter of Pride (1961) (TV)
- Dreams (1962) (TV)
- The Field Day (1963)
- Joshua: A Nigerian Portrait (1963) (TV)
- Running Away Backwards (1964)
- Children in Conflict: A Talk with Irene (1967)
- Warrendale (1967)
- A Married Couple (1969)
- Come on Children (1973)
- Red Emma (1974) (TV)
- Baptizing (1975) (TV)
- Maria (1977) (TV)
- Who Has Seen the Wind (1977)
- One Night Stand (1978) (TV)
- Silence of the North (1981)
- Tucker and the Horse Thief (1985) (TV)
- The Last Season (1986)
- Termini Station (1989)
- The Dragon's Egg (1998) (TV)
- Leonardo: A Dream of Flight (1998) (TV)
- Dying at Grace (2003)
- Memory for Max, Claire, Ida and Company (2005)
- EMPz 4 Life (2006)

=== Television series ===
- Philip Marlowe, Private Eye (1986 episode)
- Friday the 13th: The Series (1987)
- The Twilight Zone (1988 episode)
- Bordertown (1989 episode)
- Road to Avonlea (1989)
- Neon Rider (1990 episode)
- Dracula: The Series (1990, 1991 episodes)
- By Way of the Stars (1992)
- Madison (1993 episodes)
- Kung Fu: The Legend Continues (1993)
- Twice in a Lifetime (1999)

== See also ==
- The Allan King Memorial Fund at the Documentary Organization of Canada
