= W. O. Mitchell =

Canadian writer and radio personality (1914–1998)

The Honourable W. O. Mitchell PC OC
- Born: William Ormond Mitchell; March 13, 1914; Weyburn, Saskatchewan, Canada
- Died: February 25, 1998 (aged 83); Calgary, Alberta, Canada
- Occupation: Writer
- Spouse: Merna Hirth
- Writing career
- Notable works: Who Has Seen the Wind, Jake and the Kid

William Ormond Mitchell (March 13, 1914 – February 25, 1998) was a Canadian writer and broadcaster. His "best-loved" novel is Who Has Seen the Wind (1947), which portrays life on the Canadian Prairies from the point of view of a small boy and sold almost a million copies in Canada. As a broadcaster, he is known for his radio series Jake and the Kid, which aired on CBC Radio between 1950 and 1956 and was also about life on the Prairies.

== Early life and career ==
W. O. Mitchell was born in Weyburn, Saskatchewan. He studied psychology and philosophy at the University of Manitoba in Winnipeg and then completed his BA and a teaching certificate at the University of Alberta in 1943. While at the University of Alberta, Mitchell became a brother of the Delta Kappa Epsilon fraternity (Delta Phi chapter).

An author of novels, short stories, and plays, Mitchell is best known for his 1947 novel, Who Has Seen The Wind, which has sold close to a million copies in North America, and the radio series and later a collection of short stories 1961, Jake and the Kid, which subsequently won the Stephen Leacock Award. Both of these portray life on the Canadian Prairies where he grew up in the early part of the 20th century. He has often been called the Mark Twain of Canada for his vivid tales of young boys' adventures.

In 1942, while Mitchell was teaching high school, three of his short stories were published. In 1947, his first and trademark novel Who Has Seen the Wind was published to critical acclaim and commercial success. In 1948, Mitchell moved to Toronto, Ontario, to become the fiction editor for Maclean's magazine. While residing in Toronto, Mitchell created Jake and the Kid, a weekly radio series for the Canadian Broadcasting Corporation whose 320 episodes ran from 1950 to 1956. These productions were produced by Swedish immigrant CBC Radio head, Esse W. Ljungh.

In addition to producing a large body of work, Mitchell served as professor of creative writing and writer-in-residence at several Canadian universities and was the director of the Banff Centre's writing division. In 1974, he returned to Winnipeg, where he served a term as Writer in Residence at the Winnipeg School Division No.1 and was given an honorary doctorate by Brandon University. Mitchell spent his later years in Calgary, Alberta, dying there in 1998.

== Awards and honours ==
In 1973, Mitchell was made an officer of the Order of Canada. The list of other honours Mitchell has received includes honorary doctorates from five Canadian universities and being sworn in as a Member of the Queen's Privy Council for Canada on November 5, 1992. In 2000, Mitchell was honoured by the government of Canada with his image on a postage stamp.

Mitchell has had schools named after him in Calgary (W.O. Mitchell School) and Kanata, Ontario (W. O. Mitchell Elementary School).

The W.O. Mitchell Book Prize was also named for him.

== Quotation ==
Canadian actor Donald Sutherland quoted the following excerpt from Who Has Seen the Wind at the opening ceremony of the 2010 Winter Olympics in Vancouver, British Columbia, Canada.

I would walk to the end of the street and over the prairie with the clickety grasshoppers bunging in arcs ahead of me, and I could hear the hum and twang of wind in the great prairie harp of telephone wires. Standing there with the total thrust of prairie sun on my vulnerable head, I guess I learned—at a very young age—that I was mortal.

== List of works ==
=== Novels ===
- (1947) Who Has Seen the Wind (ISBN 978-0771034756)
- (1962) The Kite (ISBN 978-0770422981)
- (1973) The Vanishing Point (ISBN 978-0770510442)
- (1981) How I Spent My Summer Holidays (ISBN 978-0771061103)
- (1984) Since Daisy Creek (ISBN 978-0770420642)
- (1988) Ladybug, Ladybug (ISBN 978-0771060762)
- (1989) According to Jake and the Kid (ISBN 978-0771060731)
- (1990) Roses are Difficult Here (ISBN 978-0770425234)
- (1992) For Art's Sake (ISBN 978-0770425777)

=== Radio ===
- (1950–1956) Jake and the Kid - ran weekly on CBC Radio
- (1951, 1965 published, 1974 play, 1993 book) The Black Bonspiel of Wullie MacCrimmon

=== Stage ===
- (1978) Back to Beulah - won the Chalmers Award, 1976
- (1982) For Those in Peril on the Sea

=== Audio books ===
- (1997) An Evening with W.O. Mitchell - features Mitchell reading from his own work

=== Television ===
- (1977) The Magic Lie as host
- (1980) Canada Vignettes: Melvin Arbuckle, Famous Canadian as writer and narrator
- (1981) Titans as Stephen Leacock
- (1990) Road to Avonlea (1 episode - The Quarantine at Alexander Abraham's) as Alexander Abraham
