= List of Canadian films of 1977 =

This is a list of Canadian films which were released in 1977:

Title	Director	Cast	Genre	Notes
24 heures ou plus	Gilles Groulx		Political documentary	Completed in 1973; withheld from release until 1977
The Angel and the Woman (L'Ange et la femme)	Gilles Carle	Carole Laure, Lewis Furey	Fantasy	
Bead Game	Ishu Patel		NFB animated short	Nominated for an Academy Award for Best Animated Short Film at the 50th Academy Awards
Bernie and the Gang (Ti-mine, Bernie pis la gang...)	Marcel Carrière	Marcel Sabourin, Jean Lapointe, Rita Lafontaine, Guy L'Écuyer	Comedy	
Cathy's Curse	Eddy Matalon		Horror	
A Cosmic Christmas	Clive A. Smith	Martin Lavut, Duncan Regehr, Chris Wiggins	Animated	
Crash 'n Burn	Ross McLaren		Documentary	
Deadly Harvest	Timothy Bond	Clint Walker, Kim Cattrall	Science fiction	Bond's first film; Walker's last starring role
The Disappearance	Stuart Cooper	Donald Sutherland, Francine Racette, David Hemmings	Thriller	
Famille et variations	Mireille Dansereau		Documentary	
The Fighting Men	Don Shebib	Allan Royal, Robert Lalonde	Survival TV film	Released in theatres as Men of Steel (1988)
Full Circle	Richard Loncraine	Mia Farrow, Keir Dullea	Horror	
Games of the XXI Olympiad (Jeux de la XXIe olympiade)	Jean Beaudin, Marcel Carrière, Georges Dufaux, Jean-Claude Labrecque		Documentary	
Happiness Is Loving Your Teacher	John N. Smith	Martin Kevan, Marina Dimakopoulos	Short drama	
Henry Ford's America	Donald Brittain		Documentary	
Homage to Chagall: The Colours of Love	Harry Rasky	Narrated by James Mason	Documentary	Nominated for an Academy Award for Best Documentary Feature.
The Hottest Show on Earth	Terence Macartney-Filgate, Derek Lamb, Wolf Koenig	David Suzuki	Documentary	
I'll Find a Way	Beverly Shaffer		NFB short	Academy Award for Best Short Subject
Ilsa, the Tigress of Siberia	Jean LaFleur	Dyanne Thorne, Michel Morin, Jean-Guy Latour	Exploitation	
Ilsa the Wicked Warden	Jesús Franco	Dyanne Thorne	Exploitation	Swiss-Canadian co-production
The Inquiry Film: A Report on the Mackenzie Valley Pipeline	Jesse Nishihata		Documentary	
J.A. Martin Photographer (J.A. Martin photographe)	Jean Beaudin	Marcel Sabourin, Monique Mercure, Marthe Thiéry	Historical melodrama, romance	It was entered into the 1977 Cannes Film Festival, where Monique Mercure won the award for Best Actress; AV Preservation Trust Masterwork
The Late Blossom (Le soleil se lève en retard)	André Brassard	Rita Lafontaine, Yvon Deschamps, Denise Filiatrault	Drama	
The Machine Age (L'Âge de la machine)	Gilles Carle	Gabriel Arcand, Sylvie Lachance	Drama	
La Menace	Alain Corneau	Yves Montand, Carole Laure, Marie Dubois		France and Canada co-production
Metal Messiah	Tibor Takács	David Jensen, John Paul Young	Science fiction, musical	
The Metamorphosis of Mr. Samsa	Caroline Leaf		Animated	Ten international awards by 1981
The Old Country Where Rimbaud Died (La Vieux pays où Rimbaud est mort)	Jean Pierre Lefebvre	Marcel Sabourin, Anouk Ferjac, Myriam Boyer, Roger Blin	Drama	
One Man	Robin Spry	Len Cariou, Jayne Eastwood, Barry Morse, Carole Lazare, Jean Lapointe	Drama	Canadian Film Awards – Actor (Cariou), Supporting Actor (Lapointe), Supporting Actress (Lazare), Editing, Sound
Outrageous!	Richard Benner	Craig Russell, Hollis McLaren, Allan Moyle, David McIlwraith, Helen Shaver	Comedy	
Panic (Panique)	Jean-Claude Lord	Paule Baillargeon, Jean Coutu, Lise Thouin	Docudrama	
The Prophet from Pugwash	Carol Moore-Ede		Documentary	
Rabid	David Cronenberg	Marilyn Chambers, Frank Moore, Joe Silver	Horror	
Ragtime Summer	Alan Bridges	David Warner, Honor Blackman, Trudy Young, Cec Linder, Tim Henry	Romance	Canada-UK co-production
Rituals	Peter Carter	Hal Holbrook, Lawrence Dane, Robin Gammell	Horror	
The Rubber Gun	Allan Moyle	Stephen Lack, Allan Moyle	Drama	
The Sand Castle	Co Hoedeman		NFB animated short	Academy Award winner for animated short
Silver Blaze	John Davies	Christopher Plummer, Thorley Walters	Drama	
Skip Tracer	Zale Dalen	David Petersen, John Lazarus	Drama	
Spartree	Phillip Borsos		Documentary	Canadian Film Award – Theatrical Short, Non-Feature Cinematography, Non-Feature Sound
A Special Day	Ettore Scola	Sophia Loren, Marcello Mastroianni, John Vernon	Drama	Italy-Canada co-production; Academy Award nomination for Best Foreign-Language Film
Spinnolio	John Weldon	Henry Ramer, Peter MacNeill	Animated	
Starship Invasions	Ed Hunt	Robert Vaughn, Christopher Lee, Daniel Pilon	Science fiction	
The Uncanny	Denis Héroux	Peter Cushing, Alexandra Stewart, Ray Milland, Donald Pleasence	Horror	Canada-U.K. co-production
Welcome to Blood City	Peter Sasdy	Jack Palance, Keir Dullea, Samantha Eggar	Western, science fiction	Canada-U.K. co-production
Who Has Seen the Wind	Allan King	Brian Painchaud, Gordon Pinsent, Patricia Hamilton	Drama	Based on the novel by W.O. Mitchell
Why Shoot the Teacher?	Silvio Narizzano	Bud Cort, Samantha Eggar, Chris Wiggins	Drama	

== See also ==
- 1977 in Canada
- 1977 in Canadian television
