= List of LGBTQ-related films of 1977 =

This is a list of lesbian, gay, bisexual, transgender or queer-related films released in 1977. It contains theatrically released films that deal with important gay, lesbian, bisexual, transgender or queer characters or issues and may have same-sex romance or relationships as a plot device.

== Films ==
Title	Director	Country	Genre	Cast	Notes
Alexander: The Other Side of Dawn	John Erman	United States	Drama	Leigh McCloskey, Eve Plumb, Juliet Mills, Jean Hagen, Lonny Chapman, Earl Holliman, Alan Feinstein, Asher Brauner, Diana Douglas, Pat Corley, Frances Faye, Alice Hirson, Jonathan Banks, Fred Sadoff and Doria Cook-Nelson	
Beyond Good and Evil	Liliana Cavani	France; Italy; West Germany	Drama	Dominique Sanda, Erland Josephson, Robert Powell, Virna Lisi, Philippe Leroy, Elisa Cegani, Umberto Orsini, Michael Degen, Amedeo Amodio, Carmen Scarpitta and Clara Algranti	
Bilitis	David Hamilton	France; Italy	Drama, romance	Patti D'Arbanville, Mona Kristensen, Bernard Giraudeau, Gilles Kohler, Mathieu Carrière, Irka Bochenko, Jacqueline Fontaine, Marie-Thérèse Caumont, Germaine Delbat, Madeleine Damien, Camille Larivière and Catherine Leprince	
Desperate Living	John Waters	United States	Crime, comedy	Liz Renay, Mink Stole, Edith Massey, Susan Lowe, Mary Vivian Pearce, Jean Hill, Cookie Mueller, Channing Wilroy, Ed Peranio, Paul Swift, George Figgs, Sharon Niesp, George Stover, Turkey Joe, Al Strapelli, Brook Blake and Karen Gerwig	
Die Konsequenz	Wolfgang Petersen	West Germany	Drama	Jürgen Prochnow, Ernst Hannawald, Walo Lüönd, Edith Volkmann, Erwin Kohlund, Hans Irle, Erwin Parker, Alexander Ziegler, Werner Schwuchow, Hans-Michael Rehberg, Elisabeth Fricker, Hans Putz, Wolf Gaudlitz, Thomas Haerin, Carsten Neumann, Franz Kollasch, Alexis von Hagemeister, Jan Groth, Gerold Nölli and Franz Stiefel	
Gay USA	Arthur J. Bressan Jr.	United States	Documentary		About Gay Pride Marches.
The Goodbye Girl	Herbert Ross	United States	Comedy, drama, romance	Richard Dreyfuss, Marsha Mason, Quinn Cummings, Paul Benedict, Barbara Rhoades, Theresa Merritt, Michael Shawn, Patricia Pearcy, and Nicol Williamson	Features a performance of Richard III in which the title character is depicted as an exaggerated homosexual stereotype.
Looking for Mr. Goodbar	Richard Brooks	United States	Drama	Diane Keaton, Tuesday Weld, William Atherton, Richard Kiley, Richard Gere, Alan Feinstein, Tom Berenger, Priscilla Pointer, Laurie Prange, Joel Fabiani, Julius Harris, Richard Bright, LeVar Burton, Brian Dennehy, Richard Venture and Elizabeth Cheshire	
Me siento extraña	Enrique Martí Maqueda	Spain	Drama	Rocío Dúrcal, Bárbara Rey, Francisco Algora, Ricardo Tundidor, Eva León, Luis Marín, Rafael Navarro, José Antonio Ceinos, Francisco Nieto, Fernando Sánchez Polack, Juan A. De Los Santos (as Juan Antonio de Santos), Fabián López Tapia, Javier Sandoval, Fernando Baeza and Víctor Israel	aka I feel strange
Outrageous!	Richard Benner	Canada	Comedy	Craig Russell, Hollis McLaren, Richert Easley, Allan Moyle, David McIlwraith, Gerry Salsberg, Andrée Pelletier, Helen Shaver, Martha Gibson, Helen Hughes, Jonah Royston, Richard Moffatt, David Woito, Rusty Ryan, Trevor Bryan and Michael Ironside	
Los placeres ocultos	Eloy de la Iglesia	Spain	Drama	Simón Andreu, Tony Fuentes, Charo López, Beatriz Rossat, Antonio Corencia, Germán Cobos, Ana Farra, Ángel Pardo, Queta Claver, Antonio Iranzo, Antonio Gamero, Josele Román and Carmen Platero	aka Hidden Pleasures
Pourquoi pas!	Coline Serreau	France	Comedy, drama, romance	Sami Frey, Christine Murillo, Mario Gonzales, Nicole Jamet, Michel Aumont, Mathé Souverbie, Alain Salomon, Jacques Rispal, Florence Brière, Louise Chevalier, Bernard Crombey (as Bernard Crombé), Denise Dax, Dorothy Marchini and Geneviève Mnich	aka Why Not!
A Special Day	Ettore Scola	Italy	Drama, romance, war	Sophia Loren, Marcello Mastroianni, John Vernon, Françoise Berd, Patrizia Basso, Tiziano De Persio, Maurizio Di Paolantonio, Antonio Garibaldi, Vittorio Guerrieri, Alessandra Mussolini and Nicole Magny	
To an Unknown God	Jaime Chávarri	Spain	Drama	Héctor Alterio, Xabier Elorriaga as Miguel Maria Rosa Salgado, Rosa Valenty, Ángela Molina, Margarita Mas, Mercedes Sampietro and José Joaquin Boza	aka A un dios desconocido
El transexual	José Jara	Spain	Drama	Ágata Lys, Paul Naschy, José Nieto, Sandra Alberti, Eva Robin, Vicente Parra, Ernesto Martín, Alfonso Castizo, Ángela Reyno, Antonio Orengo, Pedro Romero, Manuel Pereiro, Yeda Brown, Pedro A. Cabrero and Nicolás Arroyo	
Valentino	Ken Russell	United States	Biographical Drama	Rudolf Nureyev, Leslie Caron	
Word Is Out	Mariposa Film Group (Peter Adair, Nancy Adair, Andrew Brown, Rob Epstein, Lucy Massie Phenix, Veronica Selver)	United States	Documentary	Writer Elsa Gidlow, professor Sally Gearhart, inventor John Burnside, civil rights leader Harry Hay, and avant-garde filmmaker Nathaniel Dorsky are among the interviewees.	
