= List of films shot in Montreal =

== Hollywood films set and shot in Montreal ==
- Wait Until Dark (1967), starring Audrey Hepburn, Alan Arkin, Richard Crenna
- La course du lièvre à travers les champs [And Hope to Die] (1972), Jean-Louis Trintignant, Aldo Ray, Robert Ryan
- The Apprenticeship of Duddy Kravitz (1974), Richard Dreyfuss, Jack Warden, Randy Quaid, Joseph Wiseman
- Tulips (1981) Gabe Kaplan, Bernadette Peters
- Afterglow (1997), starring Nick Nolte, Julie Christie, Lara Flynn Boyle
- The Jackal (1997), starring Bruce Willis, Richard Gere, Sidney Poitier
- The Whole Nine Yards (2000), starring Bruce Willis, Matthew Perry
- The Score (2001), starring Robert De Niro, Edward Norton, Marlon Brando
- Taking Lives (2004), starring Angelina Jolie, Ethan Hawke, Kiefer Sutherland
- Blades of Glory (2007), Will Ferrell, Jon Heder, Amy Poehler
- Away We Go (2009), John Krasinski, Maya Rudolph and Allison Janney
- Life of Pi (2012), Suraj Sharma, Irrfan Khan
- Come As You Are (2019), Grant Rosenmeyer, Hayden Szeto, Ravi Patel, Janeane Garofalo, Gabourey Sidibe
- The Voyeurs (2021), Sydney Sweeney, Justice Smith, Ben Hardy, and Natasha Liu Bordizzo
- Crisis (2021), Gary Oldman, Armie Hammer, Evangeline Lilly, Greg Kinnear, Michelle Rodriguez, Scott Mescudi

== Hollywood films shot in Montreal ==
- City on Fire (1979), starring Barry Newman, Susan Clark
- Quintet (1979), directed by Robert Altman; shot on the former Expo 67 site
- Once Upon a Time in America (1984), directed by Sergio Leone, starring Robert De Niro, James Woods, Joe Pesci
- The Freshman (1990), starring Marlon Brando, Matthew Broderick
- Love and Human Remains (1993), starring Thomas Gibson, Ruth Marshall
- Brainscan (1994), starring Edward Furlong, Frank Langella
- Mrs. Parker and the Vicious Circle (1994), starring Jennifer Jason Leigh, Campbell Scott
- 12 Monkeys (1995), Bruce Willis, Madeline Stowe
- Johnny Mnemonic (1995), starring Keanu Reeves, Dolph Lundgren, Dina Meyer
- Hollow Point (1996) starring Thomas Ian Griffith, Tia Carrere, John Lithgow, Donald Sutherland
- The Long Kiss Goodnight (1996), starring Geena Davis, Samuel L. Jackson
- Mother Night (1996), starring Nick Nolte, Sheryl Lee, John Goodman, Alan Arkin, Frankie Faison
- The Assignment (1997), starring Aidan Quinn, Donald Sutherland, Ben Kingsley
- Batman & Robin (1997), starring George Clooney, Chris O'Donnell, Uma Thurman
- Barney's Great Adventure (1998), starring Bob West, George Hearn, Shirley Douglas
- The Red Violin (1998), starring Samuel L. Jackson, Colm Feore
- Snake Eyes (1998), Starring Nicolas Cage, Gary Sinise, Carla Gugino
- A Walk on the Moon (1999), starring Diane Lane, Viggo Mortensen
- The Bone Collector (1999), starring Denzel Washington, Angelina Jolie, Queen Latifah
- 2001: A Space Travesty (2000), starring Leslie Nielsen
- The Art of War (2000), starring Wesley Snipes, Donald Sutherland, Anne Archer
- Battlefield Earth (2000), starring John Travolta, Barry Pepper, Forest Whitaker
- Isn't She Great (2000), starring Bette Midler, Nathan Lane
- Heist (2001), starring Gene Hackman, Danny DeVito
- Abandon (2002), starring Katie Holmes, Benjamin Bratt
- Catch Me If You Can (2002), starring Leonardo DiCaprio, Tom Hanks, Amy Adams
- Confessions of a Dangerous Mind (2002), starring Sam Rockwell, Drew Barrymore, George Clooney, Julia Roberts
- FeardotCom (2002); starring Stephen Dorff
- Gleason (2002); starring Brad Garrett, Saul Rubinek
- Lathe of Heaven (2002), starring James Caan, Lukas Haas, Lisa Bonet
- No Good Deed (2002), starring Samuel L. Jackson
- Bad Santa (2003), starring Billy Bob Thornton, Tony Cox, Bernie Mac, Lauren Graham, John Ritter
- Beyond Borders (2003), starring Angelina Jolie
- Gothika (2003), starring Halle Berry, Robert Downey Jr., Penélope Cruz
- The Human Stain (2003), starring Anthony Hopkins, Nicole Kidman
- Shattered Glass (2003), starring Hayden Christensen
- The Aviator (2004), starring Leonardo DiCaprio, Cate Blanchett, Kate Beckinsale
- Confessions of a Teenage Drama Queen (2004), starring Lindsay Lohan
- The Day After Tomorrow (2004), starring Dennis Quaid, Jake Gyllenhaal, Sela Ward and Ian Holm
- Head in the Clouds (2004), starring Charlize Theron, Penélope Cruz
- Noel (2004), starring Susan Sarandon, Paul Walker, Penélope Cruz
- The Notebook (2004), starring Ryan Gosling, Rachel McAdams
- The Terminal (2004), starring Tom Hanks, Catherine Zeta-Jones; parts were shot at Montréal-Mirabel International Airport for JFK Airport
- Wicker Park (2004), starring Josh Hartnett, Rose Byrne
- Human Trafficking (2005), starring Donald Sutherland, Mira Sorvino
- The Jacket (2005), starring Adrien Brody, Keira Knightley
- King's Ransom (2005), starring Anthony Anderson
- The Fountain (2006), starring Hugh Jackman, Rachel Weisz
- The Last Kiss (2006), starring Zach Braff, Blythe Danner
- The Covenant (2006), directed by Renny Harlin, starring Steven Strait, Sebastian Stan
- Lucky Number Slevin (2006), starring Josh Hartnett, Bruce Willis
- The Woods (2006), starring Agnes Bruckner, Patricia Clarkson
- I'm Not There (2007), starring Christian Bale, Cate Blanchett, Richard Gere, Heath Ledger
- Universal Groove (2007), starring Corey Haim
- The Curious Case of Benjamin Button (2008), starring Brad Pitt
- Death Race (2008), starring Jason Statham
- Get Smart (2008), starring Steve Carell, Anne Hathaway
- Journey to the Center of the Earth (2008), starring Brendan Fraser, Josh Hutcherson
- The Mummy: Tomb of the Dragon Emperor (2008), starring Brendan Fraser, Jet Li
- Picture This (2008), starring Ashley Tisdale, Robbie Amell, Lauren Collins, Shenae Grimes
- Punisher: War Zone (2008), starring Ray Stevenson
- Night at the Museum: Battle of the Smithsonian (2009), starring Ben Stiller, Amy Adams, Owen Wilson
- Orphan (2009), starring Vera Farmiga, Peter Sarsgaard, Isabelle Fuhrman
- Whiteout (2009), starring Kate Beckinsale, Gabriel Macht
- Beastly (2011), starring Alex Pettyfer, Vanessa Hudgens, Mary-Kate Olsen
- The Factory (2011), starring John Cusack
- Immortals (2011), starring Henry Cavill, Freida Pinto, Mickey Rourke
- On the Road (2011), starring Kristen Stewart, Sam Riley
- Source Code (2011), starring Jake Gyllenhaal, Michelle Monaghan, Vera Farmiga
- Erased (2012), starring Aaron Eckhart, Liana Liberato
- Upside Down (2011), starring Jim Sturgess, Kirsten Dunst
- Warm Bodies (2012), starring Nicholas Hoult, Teresa Palmer, Analeigh Tipton
- The Words (2011), starring Bradley Cooper, Olivia Wilde, Zoe Saldaña
- Riddick (2013), starring Vin Diesel
- Red 2 (2013), starring Bruce Willis, Helen Mirren, John Malkovich, Mary-Louise Parker, Catherine Zeta-Jones, and Sir Anthony Hopkins
- White House Down (2013), starring Channing Tatum
- X-Men: Days of Future Past (2014), starring Michael Fassbender, Jennifer Lawrence, Hugh Jackman, Ian McKellen, Patrick Stewart, Halle Berry Elliot Page, Nicholas Hoult, Evan Peters
- Brick Mansions (2014), starring Paul Walker, David Belle, RZA
- Race (2016 film) (2016), starring Stephan James (actor)
- John Wick: Chapter 2 (2017), starring Keanu Reeves, Common, Laurence Fishburne, Ian McShane, John Leguizamo
- Mother! (2017), starring Jennifer Lawrence, Javier Bardem, Ed Harris, Michelle Pfeiffer
- On the Basis of Sex (2018), starring Felicity Jones
- Scream VI (2023), starring Courteney Cox, Melissa Barrera, Jenna Ortega, Mason Gooding, Jasmin Savoy Brown, Hayden Panettiere, Samara Weaving

== Canadian films ==
- The Act of the Heart (1970), starring Genevieve Bujold and Donald Sutherland
- Shivers (1975), by David Cronenberg
- Rabid (1977), by David Cronenberg starring Marilyn Chambers
- Cathy's Curse (1977), starring Alan Scarfe
- Scanners (1981), by David Cronenberg starring Stephen Lack
- The Red Violin (1998), starring Samuel L. Jackson, Jason Flemyng, Greta Scacchi
- A Problem with Fear (2003), starring Paulo Costanzo
- End of the Line (2007), starring Ilona Elkin and Nicolas Wright
- Barney's Version (2010), starring Dustin Hoffman, Paul Giamatti
- Mile End Kicks (2025), starring Barbie Ferreira, Devon Bostick, Jay Baruchel, Isaiah Lehtinen
- Montreal, My Beautiful (2025), starring Joan Chen, Charlotte Aubin

== Québécois films in English ==
- The Luck of Ginger Coffey (1964), starring Robert Shaw
- The Pyx (1973), starring Karen Black
- City on Fire (1979), starring Barry Newman, Ava Gardner, Henry Fonda, Shelley Winters, James Franciscus, Leslie Nielsen, Susan Clark
- Mambo Italiano (2003), starring Paul Sorvino, Luke Kirby, Mary Walsh, Sophie Lorain, Ginette Reno
- Eternal (2004)
- The Trotsky (2009), by Jacob Tierney
- Good Neighbours (2010), by Jacob Tierney
- Boost (2017)

== Bilingual Québécois films ==
- Bon Cop, Bad Cop (2006)
- Funkytown (2011)
- Bon Cop, Bad Cop 2 (2017)

== Québécois films in French ==
- Le Déclin de l'empire américain (1986), by Denys Arcand
- Jésus de Montréal (1989), by Denys Arcand
- Léolo (1992), by Jean-Claude Lauzon
- August 32nd on Earth (Un 32 août sur terre) (1998), by Denis Villeneuve
- It's Your Turn, Laura Cadieux (1998), by Denise Filiatrault
- Maelström (2000), by Denis Villeneuve, starring Marie-Josée Croze, Jean-Nicolas Verreault; winner of 5 Genie Awards and 7 Jutra Awards
- The Barbarian Invasions (Les Invasions barbares) (2003), by Denys Arcand
- C.R.A.Z.Y. (2005), by Jean-Marc Vallée
- The Rocket (Maurice Richard) (2005)
- October 1970 (2006), story of the FLQ terrorist group and the October Crisis
- I Killed My Mother (J'ai tué ma mère) (2009), by Xavier Dolan
- Polytechnique (2009), by Denis Villeneuve
- Les amours imaginaires (2010), by Xavier Dolan
- Incendies (2010), by Denis Villeneuve
- Starbuck (2011), starring Patrick Huard, Julie Le Breton
- Laurence Anyways (2012), by Xavier Dolan
- Mommy (2014), by Xavier Dolan
- Red Rooms (2023), by Pascal Plante

== International films set and shot in Montreal ==
- Intent to Kill (1958), UK, Dir. Jack Cardiff
- Stateline Motel (1973), by Maurizio Lucidi, starring Ursula Andress, Eli Wallach, Barbara Bach
- Strange Shadows in an Empty Room (1976), also known as Blazing Magnums and Una magnum special per Tony Saitta
- Mr. Nobody (2009), by Jaco Van Dormael, starring Jared Leto, Diane Kruger
- A Trip With Your Wife (2019)
- Pieces of a Woman (2020)
