= Montreal Main =

1974 Canadian docufiction film by Frank Vitale

- Directed by: Frank Vitale
- Written by: Frank Vitale; Stephen Lack; Allan Moyle
- Starring: Frank Vitale; Stephen Lack; Allan Moyle
- Production company: ACPAV
- Release date: 1974
- Running time: 88 mins.
- Country: Canada
- Language: English

Montreal Main is a Canadian docufiction film, released in 1974. The film was directed by Frank Vitale, and written by Vitale, Allan Moyle and Stephen Lack.

The film centres on Frank (Vitale) and Bozo (Moyle), two friends of ambiguous sexuality living in the bohemian arts community of Montreal, Quebec. Frank develops a friendship with Johnny (John Sutherland), a 12-year-old boy, while Bozo is developing a new relationship with Jackie (Jackie Holden), a friend of Johnny's parents. Although Frank's relationship with Johnny is platonic and non-sexual, the common stereotype of gay men as pedophiles prone to sexually preying on underage boys begins to colour the community's and Johnny's parents' judgement of the friendship, driving a wedge between them as even Frank is increasingly driven to question his own motivations.

The film is also a philosophical exploration of the contrast between existentialism and essentialism.

The same core group of Vitale, Lack and Moyle also collaborated on the 1978 film The Rubber Gun.

The film was rereleased on DVD in 2009, and was the subject of a critical analysis by Thomas Waugh and Jason Garrison in 2011, as part of Arsenal Pulp Press' Queer Film Classics series.

== Cast ==
- Frank Vitale as Frank
- Stephen Lack as Steve
- Peter Brawley as Peter
- Allan Moyle as Bozo
- John Sutherland as Johnny
- Jackie Holden as Jackie
