= Rusty Ryan =

Rusty Ryan may refer to:

- Rusty Ryan (character), a character from the Ocean's film series
- Rusty Ryan (actor) (1947–2003), Canadian actor and drag queen
- Rusty Ryan (comics), a Quality Comics character
