= The Rubber Gun =

1977 Canadian comedy-drama film

- Film poster
- Directed by: Allan Moyle
- Written by: Stephen Lack; Allan Moyle
- Starring: Stephen Lack; Pierre Robert; Peter Brawley; Allan Moyle; Pam Holmes
- Cinematography: Frank Vitale
- Edited by: John Laing
- Music by: Lewis Furey
- Production company: St. Lawrence Film Productions
- Release date: 24 April 1977
- Running time: 86 minutes
- Country: Canada
- Language: English
- Budget: $90,000

The Rubber Gun is a 1977 Canadian comedy-drama film directed by Allan Moyle, in his directorial debut. The film stars Stephen Lack, Pierre Robert, Peter Brawley, Allan Moyle and Pam Holmes.

The film was released in April 1977 to generally positive reviews. The film received two Genie Award nominations at the 1st Genie Awards in 1980. The film is unique in that the characters names in the movie are the same as the actors portraying them.

== Plot ==
In a book store, smooth-talking hard drug dealer and user and local artist Steve meets Allan, a young sociology student at McGill. They become fast friends and Allan is invited to Steve's studio apartment on Montreal main to meet his commune and drug network.

Allan decides he wants to do a paper with the controversial position that drug use has positive effects using Steve's 'family' as a case study. Life with Steve and the gang isn't quite as rosy as it might appear to Allan at first but it isn't quite as sleazy as it might appear to others either.

Pierre, a bisexual, heroin addict and male prostitute with a wife and small daughter looks to displace Steve as the leader of the group when, compelled by his addiction he concocts a plan to steal drugs from a storage locker at the train station. Steve, having nearly followed through on the same plan, is certain it is a trap. Being indiscreetly watched and recorded by corrupt narcotics cops the tension rises.

== Cast ==
- Stephen Lack
- Pierre Robert
- Peter Brawley
- Allan Moyle
- Pam Holmes
- Joe Mattia
- Armand Monroe
- Bill Booth
- Curzon Olstrom
- Lily Glidden
- David Popoff
- Rainbow Robert
- Bobby Sontag
- Wolf Schwartz
- Steve Crawford
- Ron Snyder
- Marty McDonald

== Distribution ==
A restored version of the film was screened at the 2024 Fantasia Film Festival.

== Reception ==
The Canadian Film Encyclopedia said "combining improvisation, direct cinema and an intricate Pirandellian structure, director Allan Moyle's brilliant feature film debut is at once a moving portrait of the counterculture and a telling analysis of its breakup under pressure." Michael Bronkski of Gay Community News wrote it is "funny, wonderfully detailed, and amazingly non-judgmental and respectful of its characters and their lives."

Film critic Michael Talbot-Haynes wrote that "even with all of the wacko indie outlaw cinema I have seen, this is a very strange movie; it is also organically queer in many places in a natural and unguarded way, also unusual for the time; this is one of the rare ones that show how a lot of folks in the queer community back in the day were caught in hard drug distribution due to societal marginalization; the movie doesn't always shoot straight, but is more than worthy of rediscovery amongst the connoisseurs of cult artifacts."

David Mole of The Body Politic observed that in the movie "homosexuality is almost entirely absorbed into the immediacy of cinéma vérité; it is just there, moving in and out of the action without any splash; this is an incredible relief from plays and films that have to account for us, apologize for us, or fumble around for some fantasy, nice or nasty, to represent us; there is no agony in The Rubber Gun, just the ordinary business of a life that includes gayness."

The Boston Phoenix opined the film, "a pleasantly disorganized study of a family of arty, self-adoring Montreal drug-dealers, is something of a mess; promising subplots bob up only to submerge again; characters appear and disappear arbitrarily; new themes are announced with a fanfare and abandoned with a shrug; shot in a jerky, semidocumentary style and performed by actors whose names are the same as those of their characters – and whose characters are very like themselves – the film has a hipper-than-thou tone that's a bit of a pain."

== Awards ==
The film received two Genie Award nominations at the 1st Genie Awards in 1980, for Best Actor (Lack) and Best Original Screenplay (Moyle, Lack, John Laing).

== See also ==
- Cinema of Canada
- List of Canadian films of 1977
- List of LGBTQ-related films of 1977
- Montreal in films
