= Sudden Fury =

Sudden Fury may refer to:

- Sudden Fury (1975 film), a 1975 Canadian film directed by Brian Damude
- A Family Torn Apart (a/k/a Sudden Fury), a 1993 film directed by Craig R. Baxley
