= James L. Carter =

American cinematographer

- Born: Van Nuys, California
- Occupation: Cinematographer
- Years active: 1979–present

James L. Carter is an American film and television cinematographer.

== Filmography ==
- Ladder 49 (2004)
- Sleepover (2004)
- Tuck Everlasting (2002)
- Zig Zag (2002)
- The Shape of Things (2001)
- Grand Avenue (1996)
- Gunfighter's Moon (1995)
- Destiny Turns on the Radio (1995)
- Roadflower (1994)
- My Dog Skip (2000)
- Spaced Invaders (1990)
- Leatherface: Texas Chainsaw Massacre III (1990)
- Deadly Weapon (1989)
- Don't Answer the Phone! (1980)
- Home Movies (film) (1979)
