= Too Outrageous! =

- Directed by: Richard Benner
- Written by: Richard Benner; Margaret Gibson
- Produced by: Lee Gordon; Roy Krost
- Starring: Craig Russell; Hollis McLaren
- Cinematography: Manfred Guthe
- Edited by: George Appleby
- Music by: Russ Little
- Distributed by: International Spectrafilm
- Release date: 1987
- Running time: 105 minutes
- Country: Canada
- Language: English

Too Outrageous! is a 1987 Canadian comedy film directed and written by Richard Benner and starring Craig Russell as Robin Turner, a drag queen. It is based on a story by Margaret Gibson.

== Synopsis ==
A sequel to the 1977 film Outrageous!, Too Outrageous! is about the further adventures of Robin Turner, a gay hairdresser-turned-drag queen nightclub performer.

== Cast ==
- Craig Russell as Robin Turner
- Hollis McLaren as Liza Connors
- David McIlwraith as Bob
- Rusty Ryan as Jimmy
- Alan Fawcett as Les
- Cheryl MacInnes as Nurse Johnson
- Doug Annear as TV Host
- Kate Davis as The Receptionist
- Victor Redlick as The Bartender
- Norma Dell'Agnese as Homeless Lady (credited as Norma Dell Agnes)

== Recognition ==
- Nominated for Genie Award for Best Achievement in Overall Sound, 1988.
- Nominated for Canadian Society of Cinematographers Award, best cinematography in a feature film, 1987.
