= Brad Spurgeon =

Canadian journalist, author, and musician

- Spurgeon in 2012
- Born: 7 December 1957 (age 68); Toronto, Ontario, Canada
- Occupation: Motorsport journalist
- Years active: 1993–present
- Known for: Formula One reporting
- Relatives: Charles Spurgeon (descendant); Muriel Spurgeon Carder (aunt)
- Website: www.bradspurgeon.com

Bradford Carey Spurgeon (born 7 December 1957) is a Canadian-born journalist whose international career has spanned decades and disciplines. Best known for his long tenure covering Formula One racing for the International Herald Tribune and The New York Times. Spurgeon is also an author, musician, former actor and former circus performer.

== Early life and education ==
Spurgeon was born in Toronto, Ontario, to science journalist David Carey Spurgeon and Vicki Ann Jean Spurgeon. He is a descendant of the 19th-century Baptist preacher Charles Spurgeon and the nephew of Baptist minister Muriel Spurgeon Carder. His grandfather, Carey Bradford Spurgeon, was born in India to a missionary father. Spurgeon earned a diploma in broadcasting from the National Institute of Broadcasting in Canada. He later completed a degree in English and Literary Studies at the University of Toronto, followed by French language studies at the Sorbonne in Paris.

== Performing arts and television ==
In the 1970s and early 1980s, Spurgeon worked in television and film. He played a small role in the 1977 film Deadly Harvest. In 1976, he toured as a juggler and unicyclist with Puck’s Canadian Travelling Circus and performed covers of songs as well as his own material.

== Journalism career ==
Having first attended Formula One races in the late 1960s, from 1993 to 2016, he covered Formula One for the International Herald Tribune and The New York Times. Esquire UK described him as “one of the most respected voices in Formula 1 journalism.”' In 2008, he was voted Journalist of the Year in the annual Red Bulletin awards for the year's outstanding paddock people, from teams and drivers to caterers and journalists.

Spurgeon has also contributed to numerous other publications including the Los Angeles Times, The Village Voice, The Stage, and the British Medical Journal (BMJ). He also served as Formula 1 Guide for About.com for seven years. Spurgeon also was seen on television as an expert on Formula One on Al Jazeera, CNN, Eurosport and L’Équipe TV.

From 2022 to 2025, he worked as a speechwriter at the United Nations for Jean Todt, former Scuderia Ferrari team boss and UN Special Envoy for Road Safety.

== Writing and publishing ==
Spurgeon is the author of Colin Wilson: Philosopher of Optimism (Michael Butterworth Books, 2006), a non-fiction book on British author Colin Wilson.

He is also the author of Formula 1: The Impossible Collection published by New York-based publisher Assouline, with a second edition released in 2025. A compilation of his Formula 1 reporting from 1993 to 2016 is scheduled for publication in the UK in 2025.

Before covering motorsport, Spurgeon specialized in mystery fiction, especially French crime writing. He contributed to The Armchair Detective, Mystery Scene, and Crime Time. He was nominated for the Arthur Ellis Award for best mystery short story by the Crime Writers of Canada in 1997.

== Personal life ==
Spurgeon has two children and resides just outside of Paris. His wife died of breast cancer in April 2008.
