= George Appleby =

Canadian film, television editor (1939–1999)

George Appleby (1939–1999) was a Canadian film and television editor. He is most noted as a two-time winner of the Canadian Film Award for Best Editing, winning in 1968 for Isabel and in 1978 for The Silent Partner.

His other credits included the films The Reincarnate, The Far Shore, Partners, Outrageous!, Deadly Harvest, Wild Horse Hank and Too Outrageous!, and the television series The Forest Rangers, Adventures in Rainbow Country, The Ray Bradbury Theatre, Neon Rider and Cold Squad.

He served on the founding board of directors of the Academy of Canadian Cinema and Television.

In 2012, the Canadian Cinema Editors association posthumously recognized Appleby – a former member of its board of directors – with a Lifetime Achievement Award at the 2nd 2nd CCE Awards.
