= Partners (1976 film) =

- Directed by: Don Owen
- Written by: Don Owen; Norman Snider
- Produced by: Don Owen; Chalmers Adams
- Starring: Hollis McLaren; Michael Margotta; Denholm Elliott
- Cinematography: Marc Champion
- Edited by: George Appleby
- Music by: Murray McLauchlan
- Production company: Clearwater Films
- Release date: October 29, 1976
- Running time: 95 minutes
- Country: Canada
- Language: English

Partners is a Canadian thriller drama film, directed by Don Owen and released in 1976. The film stars Hollis McLaren as Heather Grey, the daughter of business magnate John Grey (Denholm Elliott); when she takes over leadership of the company after her father's death, she becomes a target for the romantic interests of Paul (Michael Margotta), a corporate spy for an American company eyeing a hostile takeover of the firm. It's also Delroy Lindo's debut.

The Ontario Censor Board forced Owen to cut 35 seconds of a sex scene from the film.

The film has most commonly been analyzed as an allegory for Canadian nationalism. It was not well received by critics, but was a Canadian Film Award nominee for Best Feature Film at the 27th Canadian Film Awards in 1976.
