= XChange (film) =

- Directed by: Allan Moyle
- Written by: Christopher Pelham
- Produced by: Jean Desormeaux; Marc S. Grenier; Stephen Ujlaki
- Starring: Stephen Baldwin; Kyle MacLachlan; Kim Coates; Pascale Bussières; Janet Kidder
- Cinematography: Pierre Gill
- Edited by: Dean Balser
- Music by: Andrew Lockington
- Distributed by: Trimark Pictures
- Release date: December 20, 2000
- Running time: 110 minutes
- Language: English

XChange (also spelled: Xchange and X Change) is a 2000 Canadian science fiction thriller film directed by Allan Moyle and starring Stephen Baldwin, Kyle MacLachlan, Kim Coates, Pascale Bussières, and Janet Kidder.

== Plot ==
Set in an alternate, undisclosed future, called 'tomorrow'.

In San Francisco, businessman Eisner Scott and his associate, Finerman, celebrate a successful quarter. Amid public fear of a notorious terrorist group, Scott is assassinated with a drone strike. In New York, elitist 'corpie' Stuart Toffler (Kim Coates) is reluctantly persuaded to attend a press conference in Scotts honor, by travelling with XChange; a biotechnology that allows people to swap their conscience and 'float' in each others bodies. He arrives in San Francisco, unknowingly having exchanged body with Scotts' assassin (Kyle MacLachlan).

At the conference, Toffler meets and clashes with his ex-girlfriend, Madeleine Renard (Pascale Bussières); a consumer advocate who is critical of XChange and the corporate class. Spending the night in San Francisco, he befriends Gloria Glowecki (Amy Sloan); a fellow floater from New York. The next day, XChange executive Allison De Waay (Janet Kidder) informs him that the assassin, a man named Fisk, has disappeared with his body. She orders him to be confined to a genetically engineered clone body (Stephen Baldwin) with a limited lifespan. He escapes, by hijacking a used worker body with a shorter and unpredictable time-limit, and returns to New York.

Toffler contacts FBI-agent Cornell Dickerson (Arnold Pinnock), who discovers that XChange has not reported the incident, and recognizes Fisk as a corporate terrorist. Wary, Toffler departs and uses his corporate pass to acquire some high-tech weapons and armor, before returning to his apartment. There, he and his AI-servant neutralize Fisks two partners. One of them, Rix, survives and murders two intervening police officers. The next morning, Rix launches a drone to assassinate Toffler, who at the last moment is able to shield his homing ID-tag. The drone remains airborne in solar-powered standby mode. Now wanted for murder, Stuart seeks out Madeleine, who agrees to help him. Remembering that Scotts son, Quayle (Charles Edwin Powell), recognized Fisks appearance in San Francisco, they deduce that he hired Fisk to assassinate his own father. Toffler tries to negotiate with Scott, but is attacked by Fisk. Unable to neutralize him without damaging his own body, he and Madeleine escapes. They try to warn Finerman, who reveals that he and Eisner opposed Quayles plans to buy XChange. Dickerson puts pressure on De Waay, who is colluding with Scott, and warns Madeleine that XChange is tracking them. With no one else to turn to, they seek shelter with Gloria (Lisa Bronwyn Moore); a promiscuous socialite who surreptitiously uses floating as party entertainment.

Expecting Fisk to strike the boardmeeting the next day, they wait for him, but are ambushed by Rix and taken to the terrorists' hideout. Stuart deliberately damages his clone body for them to escape. As the two neutralize Rix and Fisk, and warn Dickerson about the bomb they planted in Finermans boardroom, Scott appears and tries to detonate the bomb, but Stuart plants his ID-tag on him, and he is killed with the reactivated drone strike. Unable to reach XChange in time, they head for Glorias place, and use her machine to switch Toffler back into his own body. Surprisingly, Fisk does not die immediately, and takes Madeleine hostage, but succumbs as the clone belatedly expires.

Stuart and Madeleine reconcile, while De Waay angrily tries to reach Scott.

== Reception ==
Rotten Tomatoes aggregates five negative reviews of this film.
