= Michael Margotta =

American actor (born 1946)

- Born: September 1, 1946 (age 79); Pearl River, New York, U.S.
- Occupation: Actor

Michael Margotta (born September 1, 1946) is an American actor.

== Career ==
Margotta appeared in the film that was Jack Nicholson's directorial debut, Drive, He Said (1971). In the year of its release, the film caused a stir because of Margotta appearing fully nude in a mental breakdown scene. Censors at the time attempted to give the film an X rating.

On television, Margotta appeared in the 1968 I Dream of Jeannie episode "The Guru" as a strung-out hippie named Harold.

Margotta was nominated for an Emmy for his appearance on Kojak in 1976. In the same year, he acted in the Canadian thriller film Partners.

== Filmography ==
=== Film ===
Year	Title	Role	Notes
1968	Maryjane	Jerry Blackburn	
1968	Wild in the Streets	Jimmy Fergus	
1970	The Strawberry Statement	Swatch	
1970	Cover Me Babe	Steve Winston	
1971	Drive, He Said	Gabriel	Directed by Jack Nicholson
1976	Partners	Paul Howard	
1977	I Never Promised You a Rose Garden	Hallucinated Character	
1980	Times Square	JoJo	
1983	Can She Bake a Cherry Pie?	Larry	
1986	9½ Weeks	Michael	Directed by Adrian Lyne
1999	18 Shades of Dust	Petey	
2013	Third Person	Daniel	

=== Television ===
Year	Title	Role	Notes
1968	The Outcasts	Matt	Episode: "The Heroes"
1968	Shadow on the Land	Timothy Willing	Television film
1968	I Dream of Jeannie	Harold	Episode: "Jeannie, My Guru"
1969	Judd, for the Defense	Paul Miller	Episode: "Between the Dark and the Daylight"
1969–1970	Death Valley Days	Various roles	3 episodes
1969, 1970	The Mod Squad	Fred Dawson / Jerry Kane	2 episodes
1972	Hawaii Five-O	Niki	Episode: "Death Wish on Tantalus Mountain"
1972	The Streets of San Francisco	Thanos Kampacalas	Episode: "Bitter Wine"
1972	Young Dr. Kildare	Matt	Episode: "No More Than a Bad Cold"
1973	She Lives!	Al Reed	ABC Movie of the Week
1973	Needles and Pins	Jeff	Episode: "Do Your Own Thing"
1973	Toma	Paul Ziegler	Episode: "The Cain Connection"
1973	Kojak	Jack Donnelly	Episode: "Requiem for a Cop"
1974	Sorority Kill	Jackie	Television film
1974	Police Story	Cateman	Episode: "Chief"
1974	The Last Angry Man	Frankie Parelli	Television film
1975	The Blue Knight	Frank Zugarelli	Episode: "Pilot"
1976	Cannon	Allen Behr	Episode: "Snapshot"
1976	Serpico	Jerry	Episode: "Dawn of the Furies"
1977	Starsky & Hutch	Miller	Episode: "A Body Worth Guarding"
1978	Sam	Suspect	Episode #1.1
1985	Search for Tomorrow	Hardy	5 episodes
1985	Miami Vice	Tony Rivers	Episode: "Phil the Shill"
1986	Another World	Rolfe	2 episodes
1986	The Equalizer	Norrell	Episode: "Heartstrings"
1987, 1988	Max Headroom	Sully	3 episodes
1989	Something Is Out There	Jimmy	Episode: "A Hearse of Another Color"
1995	Law & Order	Mitchell	Episode: "Rebels"
2008	The Teacher (Italian series)	Actor	Episode: "Una sera troppo fredda"
2017	The Comedians	Giampaolo, Acting Coach	Episode #1.3
