= Margaret Gibson (writer) =

Canadian novelist and short story writer

- Born: June 4, 1948; Scarborough, Ontario, Canada
- Died: February 25, 2006 (aged 57); Toronto, Ontario, Canada
- Occupations: Short story writer, novelist
- Writing career
- Period: 1976–1998
- Genre: Fiction
- Notable works: The Butterfly Ward, Opium Dreams

Margaret Gibson (June 4, 1948 – February 25, 2006) was a Canadian novelist and short story writer who lived in Toronto, Ontario.

== Early life ==
Born and raised in the Toronto suburb of Scarborough, the middle child of Audrey and Dane Gibson, Margaret Gibson began writing in the early 1970s to document her struggle with mental illness. Initially diagnosed with paranoid schizophrenia, she learned only during her divorce from her first husband that she had been misdiagnosed and was in fact bipolar.

She was married in the early 1970s to Stuart Gilboord, with whom she had one son, Aaron. Following her divorce from Gilboord, Gibson moved in with her longtime friend, actor and drag performer Craig Russell. Gibson and Gilboord's custody battle for Aaron was portrayed in the 1994 television film For the Love of Aaron, in which Gibson was portrayed by actress Meredith Baxter.

== Writing career ==
Gibson published The Butterfly Ward, her debut short story collection, in 1976. The book included the story "Making It", based on her experiences living with Russell, which was later made into the feature film Outrageous! by director Richard Benner. Hollis McLaren played Liza Conners, the fictionalized version of Gibson, in that film. Benner also wrote and directed the sequel Too Outrageous! 10 years later.

"Ada", another story in the collection, was the basis of a CBC Television movie directed by Claude Jutra for the drama anthology series For the Record. It was Jutra's first English-language film production.

The Butterfly Ward was a winner of the City of Toronto Book Award in 1977, shared with Margaret Atwood's novel Lady Oracle.

Gibson's other short story collections include Considering Her Condition (1978), Sweet Poison (1993) and The Fear Room and Other Stories (1996). She published her first and only novel Opium Dreams in 1997. Opium Dreams was a winner of the Books in Canada First Novel Award, and Gibson published her final short story collection Desert Thirst in 1998.

== Later years ==
In later years, Gibson lived with Juris Rasa, her second husband. She died in 2006 of breast cancer at age 57.

== Works about Margaret Gibson ==
Her friends, Stephen Jon Postal and his wife Guia Dino Postal, chronicled Gibson's teenage life in the novel Of Margaret and Madness: A Novel Inspired by True Events (ISBN 9781434332752).

In 2011, Vassar College's Powerhouse Theater produced David Solomon's play Margaret and Craig in workshop. The play was based on the writing of Craig Russell and Margaret Gibson.

== Bibliography ==
- The Butterfly Ward, 1976
- Considering Her Condition, 1978
- Sweet Poison,1993
- The Fear Room and Other Stories, 1996
- Opium Dreams, 1997
- Desert Thirst, 1998
