= Jigsaw (1979 film) =

- French: L'Homme en colère
- Directed by: Claude Pinoteau
- Written by: Claude Pinoteau; Charles E. Israel; Jean-Claude Carrière
- Starring: Lino Ventura; Angie Dickinson
- Cinematography: Jean Boffety
- Edited by: Marie-Josèphe Yoyotte
- Music by: Claude Bolling
- Release date: March 14, 1979
- Countries: Canada; France
- Languages: French; English

Jigsaw (French: L'Homme en colère) is a 1979 Canadian-French drama film directed by Claude Pinoteau and starring Lino Ventura and Angie Dickinson.

Ventura later said of the film, "The story had problems. They were not worked out. It is easy to say, the story is everything, it must be good. But then you ask, 'What is a good story?' and I must say to you, that is one of the mysteries of the cinema."

The film's main topic is identity theft. A retired pilot is informed that his son was killed by the police. When called to examine the body, he realizes that a complete stranger was impersonating his son and using his son's passport. The father goes in search of his missing son.

== Plot ==
Romain Dupré (Lino Ventura), a retired and widowed French commercial pilot, arrives in Montreal from Paris. He has been summoned to identify the body of his estranged son, Julien (Laurent Malet), who was killed in a police shootout. But the body Dupré is presented with at the morgue is not of his son. The dead man, who was in possession of Julien's passport, is eventually identified as Luigi Lentini, a wanted criminal. Police superintendent MacKenzie (Chris Wiggins) informs Dupré that his son has overstayed his visa, and suggests he may have sold his passport for money.

Realising that Julien is probably in trouble and possibly in danger, Dupré embarks on a search for his son. On his way, he meets Karen (Angie Dickinson), a beautiful and voluble ex-convict...

== Cast ==
- Lino Ventura as Romain Dupré
- Angie Dickinson as Karen
- Laurent Malet as Julien
- Chris Wiggins as MacKenzie
- Hollis McLaren as Nancy
- R. H. Thomson as Borke
- Lisa Pelikan as Anne
- Donald Pleasence as Rumpelmayer

== Production ==
L'Homme en colère was Pinoteau's fourth film, and the third starring Lino Ventura. It was shot in Montreal and the Laurentian Mountains. It remains as the only film in which Lino Ventura, a man known for his moral values and who had been married for more than 35 years, ever kissed a woman on the mouth. According to director Claude Pinoteau, "It was like asking him to perform some frighteningly dangerous stunt".

== Reception ==
In Le Monde, Jean de Baroncelli praised Pinoteau for his direction, stating that the film "intrigues, captivates", but described the father-son relationship as "unconvincing".
