= Michelle DuBarry =

Canadian drag queen (1931–2026)

- DuBarry in 2016, with Guinness World Records certificate for being the world’s oldest drag queen
- Born: Russell Alldread; November 23, 1931; Bowmanville, Ontario, Canada
- Died: July 1, 2026 (aged 94); Toronto, Ontario, Canada
- Occupation: Drag queen
- Dancing career
- Former groups: Phase One, The Great Imposters

Russell Alldread (November 23, 1931 – July 1, 2026), better known by the stage name Michelle DuBarry, was a Canadian drag queen, who was awarded the title of the World's Oldest Performing Drag Queen by the Guinness World Records in 2015. However, the distinction was disputed by another performer, who was subsequently awarded the title in 2016.

== Background ==
Born in Bowmanville, Ontario in 1931, Alldread was a performer in childhood, winning an award for his singing at the Port Hope Music Festival in 1939. Around the same time, he had his first experience dressing in drag, when his cousins dressed him in a strapless gown for a photo shoot. He continued to be involved in theatre until moving to Toronto at age 18.

He worked for General Motors and began having relationships with men, although he met and married a woman in 1957.

== Performing career ==
After divorcing his wife in 1961, Alldread began performing in drag shows, initially under the name Anita Modé. He adopted the name Michelle DuBarry in 1969 upon joining the Phase One drag troupe, taking his new performing surname from the 1943 film Du Barry Was a Lady. When his colleagues in Phase One later moved to Vancouver, DuBarry formed a new trio, The Great Impostors, with Tammy Autumn and Rusty Ryan.

In his day job, Alldread worked as a women's shoe salesman.

As DuBarry, he was involved in the Trillium Monarchist Society and the Expressions Club, and held the title of Empress of Toronto in the Imperial Court System. He continued to perform as a drag queen in Toronto, including bar shows and charity fundraisers for causes such as HIV/AIDS awareness and Gilda's Club. DuBarry served as grand marshal of Toronto's Pride parade in 2007.

DuBarry's signature number as a performer was Nancy LaMott's "We Can Be Kind".

Following the announcement of DuBarry's Guinness distinction, some residents of Portland, Oregon argued that the title should instead be awarded to Darcelle XV, who is a year older than Alldread. Darcelle was awarded the title by Guinness on August 15, 2016.

In fall 2019, Egale Canada launched #GetHerOnEllen, a social media campaign to get her booked as an interview guest on The Ellen DeGeneres Show, both to celebrate her life story and to highlight issues around aging in the LGBTQ community.

In 2020 DuBarry appeared as a guest in the seventh episode of the first season of Canada's Drag Race, appearing as a judge in the Miss Loose Jaw Pageant, that week's maxi challenge.

In 2021, CBC Radio One's The Doc Project aired a documentary feature on DuBarry, suggesting that the COVID-19 pandemic, and the associated shutdown of nearly all drag-related venues and events in 2020, had dampened Alldread's enthusiasm for going out as Michelle anymore. In 2022, after beginning to show some symptoms of dementia, Alldread moved into a long-term care home, and a sale of some of his drag outfits and jewellery was staged at The 519 in April.

She died in Toronto on July 1, 2026 at the age of 94.
