= Head On (1980 film) =

1980 film

- Canadian theatrical film poster
- Directed by: Michael Grant
- Written by: James Sanderson; Paul Illidge
- Produced by: Michael Grant
- Starring: Sally Kellerman; Stephen Lack; Lawrence Dane; John Huston
- Cinematography: Anthony B. Richmond
- Edited by: Gary Oppenheimer
- Music by: Nathan Sassover
- Production companies: Canadian Film Development Corporation; Michael Grant Productions
- Distributed by: Astral Films (Canada); Summa Vista Pictures (United States)
- Release date: 7 September 1980
- Running time: 86 minutes
- Country: Canada
- Language: English

Head On is a 1980 Canadian drama film directed by Michael Grant. It was entered into the 31st Berlin International Film Festival. It was released on VHS home video by Vestron Video in 1985 in the USA and has not yet been released on DVD. It is also known in the USA as Fatal Attraction (not to be confused with the 1987 film of the same name).

== Plot ==
Michelle Keys and Peter Hill are two strangers in Toronto who meet by accident in a head-on traffic accident. Both of them receive only minor injuries but they bring legal action against each other. Soon their business relationship leads to romance as their mutual attraction to one another transforms into a bizarre game of sexual one-upmanship with each encounter becoming more perverse.

Michelle is a psychoanalyst married to inattentive businessman Frank, who is always traveling out of town on business trips. Peter is single and works an art professor at a local college while he keeps in close touch with his artist father, Clarke, which Peter attends art gallery showings of Clarke's paintings.

Michelle and Peter buy each other a car to replace their respective ones that were damaged by the accident, and soon set out play-acting various roles to stimulate their growing affair. Peter play-acts as Frank at one point as Michelle play-acts confessing to him about her extramarital tryst. Soon, the sexual games become more dark when Peter tells Michelle to go to a local restaurant and wait for him. Peter shows up play-acting as a robber arriving to rob the place and takes Michelle away as his hostage which leads to him having rough sex with her in a tunnel.

Michelle and Peter's games come to a halt when Peter tells Michelle to dress up like a streetwalker and wait for him to pick her up for another sexual game. But the game goes terribly wrong when Peter is delayed at work, and Michelle is arrested by undercover policeman Sonny who mistakes her for a prostitute. With Peter unreachable, Michelle is forced to call Frank to bail her out and is forced to come clean all about her affair and games with Peter. Frank moves out and Michelle ends her affair with Peter.

Some months later, Michelle and Peter meet again at Clarke's funeral where Peter wants to restart their sexual games now that Michelle is divorced. She instead forces Peter to prove his love to her by getting married. Peter agrees to marry Michelle, but backs out on her wedding day by not showing up out of his insecurity and fear of commitment.

The distraught Michelle shows up at Peter's house and resumes their games where both of them attempt to physically harm each other which becomes more dark and twisted. It leads to Michelle fleeing in her car and Peter chasing after her in his. In a final game, they both attempt to re-enact the car accident that led to them meeting in the first place and this time, both of them deliberately crash head-on into each other and the screen goes black – leaving it ambiguous if either of them will survive the impact.

== Cast ==
- Sally Kellerman as Michelle Keys
- Stephen Lack as Peter Hill
- Lawrence Dane as Frank Keys
- John-Peter Linton as Gad Bernstein
- John Huston as Clarke Hill
- Patrick Crean as Fencing Master
- Marty Galin as Male Student
- Joann McIntyre as Female Student
- Sheila Currie as Young Nurse
- Sandra Scott as Head Nurse
- Hadley Kay as Stanley
- Robert A. Silverman as Analyst
- James Kidnie as Sonny

== Awards ==
The film received two Genie Award nominations at the 3rd Genie Awards in 1982, for Best Original Screenplay (James Sanderson and Paul Illidge) and Best Editing (Gary Oppenheimer).
