= Gunfighter's Moon =

1995 film by Larry Ferguson

- Directed by: Larry Ferguson
- Written by: Larry Ferguson
- Produced by: Douglas Curtis
- Starring: Lance Henriksen; Kay Lenz; David McIlwraith
- Cinematography: James L. Carter
- Edited by: Jere Huggins
- Music by: Lee Holdridge
- Distributed by: Rysher Entertainment
- Release date: June 17, 1995
- Running time: 95 minutes
- Country: United States
- Language: English

Gunfighter's Moon is a 1995 American Western film starring Lance Henriksen, Kay Lenz and David McIlwraith. Also appearing are Nikki DeLoach, Ivan Sergei and James Victor. It was produced by Douglas Curtis and directed by Larry Ferguson.

== Plot ==
Frank Morgan, a veteran gunfighter, is summoned to Red Pine, Wyoming by former lover Linda Yarnell. She wants to protect her new husband Jordan, a store-keeper who is the temporary town sheriff, from a gang of outlaws who want to free Jack Morris, one of their number who is being held for killing Jordan's predecessor during a bank robbery. What Frank doesn't know is that he is the father of Linda's teenage daughter Kristen, who also is unaware.

== Cast ==
- Lance Henriksen as Frank Morgan
- Kay Lenz as Linda Yarnell
- David McIlwraith as Jordan Yarnell
- Nikki DeLoach as Kristen Yarnell
- Ivan Sergei as Spud Walker
- James Victor as Juan Acosta
- Yareli Arizmendi as Rosa
- Dave Ward as Jack Morris

== Production ==
The film had different titles in various countries; for instance: Das letzte Duell in Germany or Ostatnia misja in Poland. The film was shot in British Columbia, Canada.
