= Scanners =

1981 Canadian science fiction horror film

- Theatrical release poster
- Directed by: David Cronenberg
- Written by: David Cronenberg
- Produced by: Claude Héroux
- Starring: Jennifer O'Neill; Stephen Lack; Patrick McGoohan; Lawrence Dane; Michael Ironside
- Cinematography: Mark Irwin
- Edited by: Ronald Sanders
- Music by: Howard Shore
- Production company: Filmplan International
- Distributed by: New World-Mutual (Canada); Manson International (International)
- Release dates: January 14, 1981 (United States); January 16, 1981 (Canada)
- Running time: 103 minutes
- Country: Canada
- Language: English
- Budget: CAD$4.1 million
- Box office: $6.3 million / $14.2 million

Scanners is a 1981 Canadian science-fiction horror film written and directed by David Cronenberg. The film stars include Stephen Lack, Jennifer O'Neill, Michael Ironside, Lawrence Dane and Patrick McGoohan. In the film, "scanners" are psychics with telepathic and telekinetic powers. ConSec, a purveyor of weaponry and security systems, searches out scanners to use them for its own purposes. The film's plot concerns the attempt by a renegade scanner to wage a war against ConSec, while another scanner is dispatched by ConSec to stop him.

Scanners premiered in January 1981 to lukewarm reviews from critics but became one of the first films produced in Canada to successfully compete with American films at the international box office. It brought Cronenberg and his controversial style of body horror to the attention of mainstream film audiences for the first time and has since been reevaluated as a cult classic. It is particularly well known for a scene that depicts Revok psychically causing a rival scanner's head to graphically explode.

== Plot ==
Cameron Vale, a vagrant who apparently suffers from auditory hallucination in the form of hearing voices in his head, causes a rude woman in a mall food court to have a seizure by what appears to be purely psychic means. Vale is then hunted down by unknown assailants, who capture him and deliver him to Dr. Paul Ruth, a psychologist who works for the private military company ConSec.

Ruth explains to Vale that Vale is one of 237 persons known as scanners. These scanners possess supernatural powers, namely telepathy and a form of telekinesis capable of harming another human being, just as Vale did to the woman in the subway. Ruth tells Vale that the voices Vale hears are not hallucinations, but that Vale is in fact "reading" or scanning the streams of consciousness of the strangers around him, and that it is Vale's inability to recognize and control his scanning power that is causing his apparent mental illness.

Ruth injects Vale with a drug called ephemerol which temporarily inhibits scanning abilities. Ruth then teaches him to control his power so that he is not overcome by the unfiltered "voices" of other minds. Some deeper connection between scanners, Ruth's work, and the ConSec corporation is indicated.

ConSec holds a marketing demonstration of its scanning program in which a ConSec operative with scanning ability will read the thoughts of a normal (non-scanning) audience member. An attendee named Darryl Revok volunteers to be scanned.

Revok, however, is in fact himself a powerful scanner. Instead of being scanned, Revok wreaks havoc by counter-scanning the ConSec operative. He focuses his formidable abilities against the operative, causing the latter's head to explode. It is revealed that Revok has been driven insane by his uncontrollable scanning, and that he is seeking other scanners in a scheme to achieve domination over non-scanners. Revok aims to kill any scanners who refuse to join him.

Following the disastrous event, ConSec head of security Braedon Keller tells Ruth that the company's scanner program should be shut down. Ruth refuses, as he believes that scanners represent the next stage of human evolution and understands that a powerful, unknown scanner murdered the operative in the demonstration. Ruth then turns to Cameron Vale. Ruth argues that the assassination shows how dangerous Revok truly is, and convinces Vale to infiltrate Revok's group so that Revok can be neutralized and his plan thwarted. Vale begins to track down known scanners.

Unbeknownst to Ruth, Keller—a non-scanner—is working for Darryl Revok. Keller informs Revok of the doctor's plan to infiltrate his group. Revok has Vale surveilled and sends assassins to murder him as Vale visits an unaffiliated scanner, an artist named Benjamin Pierce. Revok's assassins murder Pierce, but Vale survives and is able to read Pierce's dying thoughts. Vale learns of a group of scanners who oppose Revok, led by a woman named Kim Obrist. Vale tracks down Obrist and attends a meeting of the group, but Revok's assassins strike again; only Vale and Obrist survive. In the aftermath of the attack, Vale and Obrist learn of a pharmaceutical company named Biocarbon Amalgamate which has some apparent connection to the ephemerol drug.

Vale infiltrates the Biocarbon Amalgamate factory, where he discovers that it is run by Darryl Revok and that it manufactures ephemerol. Vale learns that Revok is distributing the drug with a ConSec computer program codenamed "Ripe". Vale and Obrist visit Ruth at the ConSec headquarters to update him on their discoveries. The doctor admits that he himself founded Biocarbon Amalgamate but that he no longer has a direct connection to it, and claims ignorance both of Revok's involvement and of the Ripe program. Ruth encourages Vale to investigate further by hacking into the ConSec computer network with his scanning ability. Ruth explains that a cybernetic structure is analogous to the human neural network, which should allow Vale to access the ConSec telepathically.

Vale takes leave of Ruth while Obrist is held captive by Keller but uses her powers to escape him. On Revok's orders, Keller kills Ruth and attempts to have ConSec guards murder Vale and Obrist, however the two scanners use their telepathic powers to neutralize the guards and are able to flee ConSec. From a telephone booth, Vale succeeds at scanning into the ConSec network, and he "downloads" information about ephemerol shipments into his mind.

Keller is killed when the computer explodes during his attempt to intercept Vale. Vale and Obrist visit Dr. Frane, someone who is receiving the drug. Obrist encounters a pregnant woman and realizes the woman's fetus has scanned her. Vale confronts Dr. Frane and learns that Revok's plan is to prescribe ephemerol to pregnant women, turning their children into scanners. Revok's group captures Vale and Obrist and takes them to the Biocarbon Amalgamate plant.

Revok reveals to Vale that they are both sons of Dr. Ruth, who developed ephemerol as a sedative for pregnant women. Ruth learned about the drug's side effect during his wife's pregnancies, and he made them the most powerful scanners in the world by administering a prototype dosage prior to abandoning them. Revok plans to create and lead a new generation of scanners to take over the world, but Vale refuses to join him. Vale accuses Revok of acting like his father, which enrages Revok. The brothers engage in a telepathic duel, which incinerates Vale's body. However, when Obrist encounters Revok, she discovers that Vale somehow has managed to swap minds with Revok, the latter dying in the former's body during the duel.

== Cast ==
- Jennifer O'Neill as Kim Obrist
- Stephen Lack as Cameron Vale
- Patrick McGoohan as Dr. Paul Ruth
- Lawrence Dane as Braedon Keller
- Michael Ironside as Darryl Revok
- Robert Silverman as Benjamin Pierce
- Mavor Moore as Curtis Trevellyan
- Lee Broker as Security One
- Anthony Sherwood as Aiden
- Fred Doederlein as Dieder Tautz
- Victor Désy as Dr. Gatineau
- Louis Del Grande as First Scanner
- Alex Stevens as ConSec Programmer

William Hope, Christopher Britton, and Leon Herbert have uncredited appearances as Biocarbon Amalgamate employees. Neil Affleck has a minor role as a medical student.

== Production ==
=== Financing ===
Scanners was based on David Cronenberg's scripts The Sensitives and Telepathy 2000, which he planned to pitch to Roger Corman before beginning work on The Brood. Corman was shown the script, but did nothing with it. Cronenberg has called Scanners one of his most difficult films to make; most Canadian film productions of the 1970s and the early 1980s were funded through a 100-percent Capital Cost Allowance tax shield for investors passed by Prime Minister Pierre Trudeau in 1974, and the film was rushed into production without a finished script or constructed sets to claim the subsidies.

Victor Snolicki, Dick Schouten, and Pierre David of Vision 4, a company taking advantage of Canada's tax shelter policies, aided Cronenberg in the film's financing. Vision 4 dissolved after Schouten's death and reorganized into Filmplan International.

=== Filming ===
The film's first draft was not a script, but instead a series of ideas. The film was given two weeks of pre-production while a script was not yet written. According to Cronenberg, he would spend mornings prior to filming writing scenes. The film was initially titled The Sensitives, but it was altered as Cronenberg felt "it was too wimpy" while Scanners "was very strong". Cronenberg stated that the drug aspect of the film might have been influenced by Blue Sunshine. Star Jennifer O'Neill was given a script with all of the violence edited out and cried after seeing the uncensored script.

The film was shot in Montreal from October 30 to December 23, 1979, on a budget of $4.1 million (equivalent to $16,830,500 in 2025). Cronenberg stated that "the first day was the most disastrous shooting day I've ever had" as "there was nothing to shoot" and a distracted truck driver watching the film crew hit a car, killing two women inside it.

The "Future Complex" building in Vaudreuil-Dorion, erected in 1972 by the pharmaceutical company Roche Holding, provided the exterior of 'ConSec' headquarters. Although many sources state that the lecture scene was filmed at Concordia University, it was actually shot in the 158-seat auditorium of the "Future Complex" building. The head explosion portion of the scene was filmed in a warehouse on Montreal's waterfront.

The Charles J. Des Baillets Water Treatment Plant doubled as the 'Bicarbon Amalgamate' compound. The sequence of Revok (Michael Ironside) hijacking a car and causing another to crash were shot on Rue de la Commune. Additional scenes were filmed in the Yorkville neighborhood. However, since the United States dominated the film industry and Canadian films were being marketed for international audiences, the film downplays its Canadian origin in favor of a generic "North American" setting. The only indicators of its location are a scene of Revok and Keller meeting at the Yorkdale station of the Toronto subway and some visible bilingual signs.

Cronenberg stated that "Scanners had the longest post-production of any film I've ever done" due to its nine months of editing and reshoots.

=== Effects ===
Make-up artist Dick Smith (The Exorcist, Amadeus) provided prosthetics for the climactic scanner duel and the iconic exploding head effect. Chris Walas, working at Lucasfilm at the time and later providing effects work for The Fly and Naked Lunch, also worked on the exploding head effect. Cronenberg later said in 2006 that Scanners was his most difficult film to shoot due to its special effects and complex story.

Scene of the explosion of a ConSec scanner's head

The head explosion scene was produced by trial and error, with the producers eventually deciding on a gelatin-encased plaster skull packed with "leftover burgers" as well as "latex scraps, some wax, and just bits and bobs and a lot of stringy stuff that we figured would fly through the air a little better". When other explosive techniques failed to give the desired effect, special effects supervisor Gary Zeller told the crew to roll cameras and get inside their trucks with doors and windows closed; he then crouched down behind the dummy and shot it in the back of the head with a shotgun.

The exploding head scene was filmed four times, but Cronenberg accepted the first shot and did not remain to watch the three others, opting to instead take a nap in his Winnebago. The scene depicting the exploding head was trimmed down to allow for a R-rating from the MPAA. Cronenberg originally intended for the scene to be the film's opening, but placed it later in the film after test screenings.

== Release ==
The film was distributed by New World Pictures in Canada, Les Films Mutuels in Quebec, and Avco Embassy Pictures in the United States. Scanners was released in the United States on January 14, and in Canada on January 16, 1981.

A novelization by Leon Whiteson, David Cronenberg's Scanners, was also released in 1981. The film was released on VHS in 1982.

== Reception ==
=== Box office ===
The film grossed $2,758,147 from 387 theatres in its opening weekend. It grossed domestically a total of $14,225,876 at the box office. Cronenberg stated that it was his first film to be number one at the box office.

=== Critical response ===
On Rotten Tomatoes, the film holds an approval rating of 68% based on 44 reviews, with an average rating of 6.7/10. The site's critical consensus reads, "Scanners is a dark sci-fi story with special effects that'll make your head explode." On Metacritic it has a weighted average score of 60 out of 100 based on reviews from 8 critics, indicating "mixed or average reviews". Film professor Charles Derry, in his overview of the horror genre Dark Dreams, cited Scanners as "an especially important masterwork" and calling it the Psycho of its day. In a contemporary review for Ares magazine, Christopher John commented that "Scanners is top-notch entertainment. It is haunting, exciting, shocking and literate—an unusual combination to discover in a film these days."

Some reviews were less positive. Film critic Roger Ebert gave Scanners two out of four stars and wrote, "Scanners is so lockstep that we are basically reduced to watching the special effects, which are good but curiously abstract, because we don't much care about the people they're happening around". In his review for The New York Times, Vincent Canby wrote, "Had Mr. Cronenberg settled simply for horror, as John Carpenter did in his classic Halloween (though not in his not-so-classic The Fog), Scanners might have been a Grand Guignol treat. Instead he insists on turning the film into a mystery, and mystery demands eventual explanations that, when they come in Scanners, underline the movie's essential foolishness". John Simon of National Review described Scanners as trash.

A reassessment of Scanners in the 2012 issue of CineAction looks at the film in light of Cronenberg's use of allegory and parables in much of his work. The argument is made that Cronenberg uses iconic imagery that refers directly and indirectly to the thirty-something Scanners as 1960s political radicals, counterculture hippies, and as nascent Young Urban Professionals. As a result, the film can be seen "as an oblique reflection on what might happen when the counterculture becomes the dominant culture". Kim Newman noted in an essay for The Criterion Collection that at the same time the film rejects the conservative values of the 1980s and the nostalgia for the 1950s present in contemporary science-fiction films such as E.T. the Extra-Terrestrial and Back to the Future. The film's fictional drug ephemerol also mirrors the real-life thalidomide scandal, in which the popular West German medication thalidomide caused severe birth defects in children born to mothers prescribed the drug for morning sickness in Western Europe and Canada.

=== Accolades ===
Although Scanners was not nominated for any major awards, it did receive some recognition. The Academy of Science Fiction, Fantasy and Horror Films gave the film its Saturn Award in 1981 for "Best International Film", and, in addition, the "Best Make-Up" award went to Dick Smith in a tie with Altered States. The film had also been nominated for "Best Special Effects".

Scanners also won "Best International Fantasy Film" from Fantasporto in 1983, and was nominated for eight Genie Awards in 1982, but did not win any.

== Soundtrack ==
Mondo released the Howard Shore score for Scanners, alongside The Brood, on vinyl; it features cover art by Sam Wolfe Conelly.

== Franchise ==
Scanners spawned sequels and a series of spin-offs; a remake was announced in 2007, but as of 2022 had not gone into production. Cronenberg was not involved in the sequels as he was both uninterested and would not make money off the characters or story he wrote.

=== Canceled remake ===
In February 2007, Darren Lynn Bousman (director of Saw II, Saw III, and Saw IV) was announced as director of a remake of the film, to be released by The Weinstein Company and Dimension Films. David S. Goyer was assigned to script the film. The film was planned for release on October 17, 2008, but the date came and went without further announcements and all of the parties involved have since moved on to other projects because Cronenberg did not give his approval.

=== Television series ===
A television series adaptation was attempted by Dimension in 2011, Media Res and Bron Studios in 2017, and HBO, Media Res Studio, and Wayward Films in 2022.

== See also ==
- List of cult films

== Works cited ==
- Cronenberg, David (2006). David Cronenberg: Interviews with Serge Grünberg. Plexus Publishing. ISBN 0859653765.
- Mathijs, Ernest (2008). The Cinema of David Cronenberg: From Baron of Blood to Cultural Hero. Wallflower Press. ISBN 9781905674657.
- Rodley, Chris, ed. (1997). Cronenberg on Cronenberg. Faber and Faber. ISBN 0571191371.
- Turner, D. John, ed. (1987). Canadian Feature Film Index: 1913-1985. Canadian Film Institute. ISBN 0660533642.
