= Rusty Ryan (actor) =

Canadian actor

- Born: Robert Brian Timbrell; December 28, 1947; Kingston, Ontario
- Died: July 28, 2003 (aged 55); Liverpool, Nova Scotia
- Occupations: actor, drag queen
- Known for: The Great Impostors, Outrageous!

Rusty Ryan was the stage name of Robert Brian Timbrell (December 28, 1947 – July 28, 2003), a Canadian actor and drag queen. He was a founding member of The Great Impostors, a long-running drag troupe in Toronto, Ontario, whose members included Ryan, Tammy Autumn, Michelle DuBarry, Danny Love, Jackie Loren, Terri Stevens, Christian Jefferies and Dale Barnett at different times.

Timbrell was born in Kingston, Ontario, on December 28, 1947, the younger brother of politician Dennis Timbrell. He was working as a stockbroker when he first began performing in the 1970s, and was given his drag name by friend and fellow performer Craig Russell. With the Great Impostors, Ryan toured extensively across Canada, giving many smaller communities their first exposure to drag and LGBT culture; in the 1980s, he accompanied Frankie Goes to Hollywood on their North American tour. In 1992, he wrote and performed a one-man play, Driving to Tatamagouche, at the Toronto Fringe Festival.

He also had numerous minor roles in television and film. Best known to film audiences for his supporting role as Jimmy the bartender in Outrageous! and its sequel Too Outrageous, he also appeared in the television films The Sins of Dorian Gray and The Wharf Rat, the theatrical film 54, an episode of Queer as Folk and a music video by Platinum Blonde.

He died of a heart attack on July 28, 2003, in Liverpool, Nova Scotia, following a performance that was part of his first tour performing comedy out of drag. Following his death, writer Jeffrey Round prepared and released a documentary film, Driving with Rusty.
