= Sudden Fury (1975 film) =

- Directed by: Brian Damude
- Written by: Brian Damude
- Produced by: Lawrence J. (Ben) Caza
- Starring: Dominic Hogan; Gay Rowan; Dan Hennessey
- Cinematography: James B. Kelly
- Edited by: David Nicholson
- Music by: Matthew McCauley
- Production company: Film Can Productions
- Distributed by: Ambassador Film Distributors
- Release date: November 7, 1975
- Running time: 92 minutes
- Country: Canada
- Language: English

Sudden Fury is a Canadian thriller drama film directed by Brian Damude and released in 1975.

The film centres on Fred (Dominic Hogan) and Janet (Gay Rowan), an unhappily married couple who are taking a trip. Fred needs some of Janet's money to invest in a country inn, but after Janet both refuses and reveals that she has been having an extramarital affair, Fred drives the car into the ditch and leaves Janet to die; however, when Al (Dan Hennessey) stops to save her, Fred undertakes a scheme to frame Al for Janet's murder by also setting him up to kill the owners of the farm where Fred has taken refuge.

The film's cast also includes Hollis McLaren, David Yorston, Eric Clavering, Sean McCann, Robin Ward, Steve Weston and Gerry Huckstep.

The film was a Canadian Film Award nominee for Best Motion Picture at the 26th Canadian Film Awards in 1975.

== Critical response ==
Writing for Cinema Canada, Piers Handling wrote that "I started out by saying that Sudden Fury was somewhat of a formula film. It is very much an action film and it becomes more and more so throughout its length, as the visual passages begin to replace dialogue. One of its weaknesses, however, is its occasional wordiness. One of the signs of a true master is sensing when an image can be used to replace dialogue, or when dialogue is superfluous to the visuals. Damude has yet to learn this." He concluded that "there is a raw sense of cinema about Sudden Fury, so even with its lapses it manages to convey its ideas strongly though crudely."

Martin Knelman of The Globe and Mail reviewed the film negatively, writing that "On its own terms, the picture works, but what terms! Sudden Fury is efficient in the naive manner of drugstore mystery-book trash, so the fact that it sells doesn't exactly swell one's heart with pride at the accomplishments of the Canadian film industry." He further opined that "Damude isn't coasting, like the fallen great man Orson Welles, or trying to stretch himself, like the restless Louis Malle. Sudden Fury represents the limit of his aspirations. The fact that something like this could be regarded in some quarters as a breakthrough makes Sudden Fury the most depressing film of the lot."

In his 2003 book A Century of Canadian Cinema, Gerald Pratley called it an "effectively told and cleverly filmed low-budget picture", and a "straightforward but ingenious tale".

== Legacy ==
In October 2019, a restored print of the film was screened at the TIFF Bell Lightbox as part of the See the North film screening series, alongside a talk by Damude about the film. In the same year, Nicole Dorsey used the film as a plot point in her debut film Black Conflux, in a scene featuring the sociopathic lead character Dennis watching Sudden Fury on video.
