= Richard Benner =

American film director

- Born: 1943; Sterling, Illinois, United States
- Died: December 2, 1990 (aged 46–47); Toronto, Ontario, Canada
- Occupations: Film director Screenwriter
- Years active: 1977–1990

Richard Benner (1943 – December 2, 1990) was an American film director and screenwriter who worked predominantly in Canada. His 1977 film Outrageous! was entered into the 28th Berlin International Film Festival, where Craig Russell won the Silver Bear for Best Actor.

Benner grew up in Kentucky, studied drama in California and England, and moved to Toronto in the early 1970s. Writing for the Canadian Broadcasting Corporation, he pitched an idea for a film about a gay hairdresser with dreams of New York City success to the Canadian Film Development Corporation (now Telefilm Canada). Approved, he was able to secure financing with the help of Toronto producers, and Outrageous!, the first film to feature Craig Russell, an openly gay cabaret performer, went on to critical success at the 1977 Cannes Film Festival. Funny and sympathetic, Outrageous! is considered a landmark film in Canadian queer cinema. Ten years later, Benner talked Russell into doing a sequel (1987), which fared not nearly as well. Benner died from complications due to AIDS in 1990. In addition to his films, he directed several episodes of the Canadian television series 9B, Monsters, Street Legal and Road to Avonlea.

== Selected filmography ==
- Outrageous! (1977)
- Happy Birthday, Gemini (1980)
- Too Outrageous! (1987)
