= Deadly Harvest (1977 film) =

1977 Canadian "eco-thriller" film

- Theatrical poster
- Directed by: Timothy Bond
- Written by: Martin Lager
- Produced by: Anthony Kramreither; Len Herberman (executive)
- Starring: Clint Walker; Nehemiah Persoff; Kim Cattrall
- Cinematography: Robert Brooks
- Edited by: George Appleby
- Music by: John Mills-Cockell
- Production companies: Burg-Ambassador, Joebeck Production
- Distributed by: Ambassador Film Distributors
- Release date: 21 August 1977 (WFF)
- Running time: 86 minutes
- Country: Canada
- Language: English
- Budget: US$250,000

Deadly Harvest is a 1977 Canadian science-fiction "eco-thriller" film directed by Timothy Bond, about a farmer (Clint Walker) who struggles to keep food on the table and regain his son from a gang of marauding city-folk during a terrible worldwide famine, brought on by global cooling due to, among other named causes in a voice-over, overpopulation, urban sprawl, the energy crisis, pollution, and the high cost of transporting grain. The film was produced by Anthony Kramreither and Len Herberman, with a screenplay by Martin Lager, and features an score by John Mills-Cockell. The film is notable as Timothy Bond's first film, and as an early example of survivalism in film, having been compared to No Blade of Grass.

== Plot ==
The beginning of the end came in the late '70s. The climate changes... the energy crisis, the shortages, the high costs of growing and transporting grain, the lack of government support for research programs. The disappearance of arable land beneath the monoliths of reinforced concrete and steel as the urban centers continued their unchecked sprawl into the countryside. The industrial pollution that poisoned the earth, the water, and the air. And the continuing growth of population out of all bounds of reason. More and more people, less and less food. By the end of the '70s, the fabric of society was breaking down in most parts of the world... And then, the bubble burst.

— Deadly Harvest voice-over (quoted by Erwann Perchoc)

In an over-industrialized near future, climate change in the form of global cooling has shrunk available farmland and a worldwide famine has ensued. Government neither informs its citizens nor does anything to avert or even ameliorate the looming catastrophe.

In the countryside, cattle-thieving black marketeer Mort Logan (Nehemiah Persoff) raids at will, slaughtering scarce livestock. In response, some of the country folk act to protect their diminishing resources by forming a militia. Hydroponic farmer Grant Franklin (Clint Walker) and his family are among the few people with any food to spare, but the stoic farmer refuses to fight, avoiding trouble as he sees it. When his eldest daughter Susan (Kim Cattrall) loses their only cow to marauders from the city, he takes this, too, in his stride, though it would have fed the family for a long time. Michael, Grant's impetuous son (Geraint Wyn Davies), eager for action, joins the local militia.

Tensions rise in Toronto: there are food riots. Computer consultant Charles Ennis (David Brown) and his frail father (Tim Whelan) drive out from the city, begging for produce for his sickly sister (Nuala Fitzgerald): the shops in the city are empty. Suspicious at first, Grant yields after his daughter makes pleas on their behalf. The Franklins assemble a produce basket for the starving pair, off-handedly mentioning the wedding spread they are preparing for Susan the following day.

Ennis and his father are waylaid by militia men who accuse them of stealing the food, confiscating it. The elder Ennis, badly frightened, dies of a heart attack. His angry son goes back to Toronto and seeks out Logan, offering him a map to the Franklin wedding in exchange for a very small supply of food. Logan and his crew go to the wedding, unexpectedly exchanging gunfire with the militia. Grant's wife (Dawn Greenhalgh) and Susan's groom are both killed, galvanizing Grant. Michael fights off Logan, killing one of his thugs. Finding an address on the back of the discarded map, Franklin drives to Toronto seeking revenge on Ennis.

Logan delivers to Ennis a bag of food stolen from the wedding and vows to raid all of the surrounding farms before leaving. Franklin finds and begins to assault Ennis in his office until Ennis reveals that his father Tim was killed when Franklin's son Michael stole back the food Franklin had given them. Ennis shows Franklin data on his computer indicating that there are only 27 days of food reserves remaining for urban life support in North America.

Franklin races home; meanwhile, Logan and his crew return to the Franklin farm and a gun battle ensues.

It seems likely that this is not the end of the family's troubles - nor of the world's.

== Cast ==
- Clint Walker as Grant Franklin
- Geraint Wyn Davies (credited as Gary Davies) as Michael Franklin
- David Brown as Charles Ennis
- Jim Henshaw as John McCrae
- Dwayne McLean as Frank Wilcox
- Tami Tucker as Bobbie Franklin
- Kim Cattrall as Susan Franklin
- Dawn Greenhalgh as Leah Franklin
- John Stoneham as Sam
- Nehemiah Persoff as Mort Logan
- Timothy Whelan as James Ennis
- Les Carlson as The Minister
- Nuala Fitzgerald as Joyce Ennis
- Cec Linder as The Chairman (Henry)
- Sean Sullivan as Dr. Abbott (George)
- Leo Leyden as The Minister of Agriculture
- Michael Tait as Politician
- Jan Rubeš as Swenson
- Wally Crouter as Militia Man

In addition, the cast includes Rebecca Lager, Hoah Cowan, Brad Spurgeon, Stan Lesk, Richard Ayres, John-Peter Linton, Marcel Bérubé, and Terry Martin.

=== Notes ===
Deadly Harvest was Clint Walker's final lead role; after its theatrical release he went into semi-retirement, accepting only occasional acting roles. The feature also marked the film debut of Geraint Wyn Davies and of Dwayne McLean.

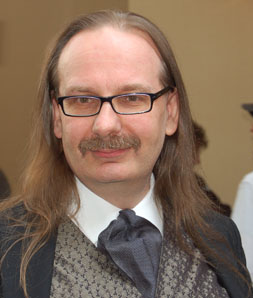
English critic Kim Newman

== Genres, themes, and analysis ==
Kim Newman places Deadly Harvest alongside other 1970s end of the world films frequently drawn from 1950s or 1960s science fiction novels, typically pitting ecology-conscious characters ("hippie communes") against "contaminated violence freaks". An organizer of the Stiff Legged Film Festival suggests that these kinds of films, concerned with environmental disaster, have this in common: "Whether we're already stuck in this future, as in No Blade of Grass, we time-travel to it, like Idaho Transfer, or we see it unfold in real-time, like Deadly Harvest, these films show that all hope is both lost and not lost, that the impulse to survive ... is always built into the human condition."

Andrew Burke calls Deadly Harvest a "key Canadian contribution to this genre". The film is an example of a contemporaneous "Canuxsploitation" trend, or "Canadian Tax Shelter exploitation movie". In an interview with Natalie Edwards shortly after principal photography was complete, producer Tony Kramreither played down the catastrophic aspect of Deadly Harvest, insisting the story was kept on "a human scale; little people, a small community".

Ezekiel Crago remarks how Deadly Harvest is a rare example in film of urban class struggle transposed to a rural setting, in which the alienated farmers live in the rural space "even though they can no longer grow anything as they attempt to hold onto what food they have", struggling against "agents of organized crime from the city who operate a black market (a threat from the urban upper-class coded as parasites on society), ultimately using their massive farm machinery itself to defeat their foes; in this rather populist film, the silent majority wins over the urban elite."

== Production ==
=== Background and financing ===
Tim Bond had previously only directed stage plays, while scriptwriter Martin Lager was similarly first a playwright when they took on Deadly Harvest, titled Doomsday prior to the beginning of production. Scientific consultation was provided by City Green Hydroponics.

Described by Kramreither as having a "big budget" (one source says US$250,000), investors included Ambassador, Famous Players and "private sources".

=== Filming ===
Principal photography took place at locations in Toronto and Pickering, Ontario over four weeks beginning in November 1976 and ending in early December, adapting the day for night technique to a "December-for-August approach" for the purposes of depicting a world having undergone global cooling.

=== Music ===
John Mills-Cockell's score consists of "largely synthesized drones", which Andrew Burke compares to the "electronic pulses and bleeps" of Michael Snow's La Région Centrale.

== Release ==
The film had its premiere at the first Montreal World Film Festival, on 21 August 1977.

=== Distribution ===
Kramreither, who emphasized "financing and sales, promotion and distribution" were the keys to Canadian success in the film industry, said the film would have good distribution, Ambassador itself. In a letter to the editor in response to this interview, Allan Eastman refers to a lawsuit over Deadly Harvest but reveals no details as to who sued whom nor over what aspect of the film.

Deadly Harvest was broadcast on CBC television on 14 June 1980.

=== Home media ===
Deadly Harvest was released on VHS in March 1986 (New World Video) and on 7 October 1991 (Anchor Bay).

The film was released on DVD on 1 June 2003 (Osiris Entertainment), and on 18 February 2012 (Desert Island Films). A digitally remastered edition was released on 14 April 2015 (Filmrise), available through Turner Classic Movies. On 30 July 2019, it was released as a bonus feature on a Deadtime Stories DVD by Frolic Pictures.

== Reception ==
=== Commercial performance ===
The film, like most of the B series Kramreither produced between 1974 and 1979, was a financial success.

=== Critical response ===
==== Contemporary ====
Writing for Maclean's after the premiere, Joan Fox summarily dismissed Deadly Harvest as a "bad" film:

Canadians are starving. The actors must have been starving too as they constantly fell to their knees, smote their breasts and rolled their eyes to heaven imploring one another for aid. Lillian Gish is still alive and well in Canada.

==== Retrospective ====
In a 2007 review, Dave Sindelar concedes that there are "plenty of flaws" (variable acting, an uneven score, and "on the obvious side") but its "premise is interesting" and the story "sturdy enough".

In a 2017 review, Erwann Perchoc calls Deadly Harvest an interesting B movie, though it is a bit of a pastiche of its American B movie precursors, and yet the presentation is distinct from them by substitutions for the usual Hollywood staples: chases take place in fields and the final demolition derby is a match between tractors. The script holds up well, with a particularly successful melancholy atmosphere created by the dull yellow and orange colours - almost sepia tone - and by the somewhat dated score, full of "half-detuned" synthesizers, comparing the film's pessimistic outlook to Philip Wylie's The End of the Dream: the film depicts the disintegration of social bonds, increasing levels of violence in human relations, and attempts at mutual aid as all doomed to bitter failure.

Peter Kenter calls the film's approach to the famine "almost quaintly Canadian"; a food riot consists of about "two dozen disappointed citizens scuffl[ing] weakly with each other in front of the local government food distribution centre," followed by "driving action--long, drawn-out travel sequences as characters ply the roads ... in monster Cadillacs and big ass pick-ups, despite repeated references to a critical fuel shortage," which Kenter attributes to Bond's and Lager's backgrounds in the theatre, "treating long commutes like scene changes on stage." As for the soundtrack, it "is downright creepy, switching between eerie synth, lumbering keyboards and maudlin piano themes with alarming impropriety."

While conceding that Deadly Harvest is "not a great film", being "poorly acted, clunkily directed, clumsily shot, and unimaginatively scripted", nevertheless Andrew Burke finds the film "completely fascinating" especially for its use of the Canadian winter landscape to evoke "ecological destruction and desperation." He agrees with Kenter that the artificial sound of the synthesizer is perceived as "unnatural" by some, and appreciates its use in the film "to give tonal form to the catastrophic consequences of humanity's alienation from the natural environment."

== Influence ==
A number of outlets, including music magazine The Quietus reported about or engaged in speculation by fans or music scholars interested in Scottish electronic music duo Boards of Canada that the title and sound of their fourth studio album, Tomorrow's Harvest (2013), was inspired by Deadly Harvest, noting that "this idea seems to be reflected by the song titles", in particular "Cold Earth", "Sick Times" and "New Seeds", and that "the album sleeve and the overall mood of the record" were thematically similar.

The album's dominant themes, environmental collapse and the degradation and decay of the landscape, fit closely with a strain of genre cinema from the 1970s and 1980s. Most significant perhaps ... Deadly Harvest released on VHS, an eco-thriller about dwindling resources that features an eerie synth score by John Mills-Cockell.

Erwann Perchoc suggests Mills-Cockell's score anticipates both the sound of the duo and common themes such as agricultural revolt and the end of the world. Boards of Canada have denied that Tomorrow's Harvest deals with post-apocalyptic themes, stating "it is about an inevitable stage that lies in front of us."

== See also ==
- No Blade of Grass (film)
