= David McIlwraith =

Canadian actor

- Born: Canada
- Occupation: Actor

David McIlwraith is a Canadian actor who has appeared in numerous television series and in several films since the 1970s.

He co-starred in the 1993 television series White Fang and also had a prominent role as Dr. Reginald Murdoch in the 2001 television series Vampire High. He portrayed politician Peter Lougheed in the 2002 mini-series Trudeau. He had a supporting role in the 2005 television film Living With the Enemy. In 2006, he appeared in the feature film Hollow Man II.

== Filmography ==
Year	Title	Role	Notes
1977	Outrageous!	Bob	
1980	Happy Birthday, Gemini	Sam Weinberger	
1980	Final Assignment	Richard	
1986	The Vindicator	Carl Lehman / Frankenstein	
1987	Too Outrageous!	Bob	
1989	Millennium	Tom Stanley	
1991	If Looks Could Kill	Agent Corben	Uncredited
1991	Il colore dei suoi occhi	Mr. Henderson	
1995	Gunfighter's Moon	Jordan Yarnell	
2000	Nuremberg	Colonel John Harlan Amen	2 episodes
2000	Cruel Intentions 2	Edward Valmont	
2002	Tom Stone	Stan Gordon	1 episode
2002	Trudeau	Peter Lougheed	TV movie
2001-02	Vampire High	Dr. Reginald Murdoch	26 episodes
