= Cathy's Curse =

1977 supernatural horror film directed by Eddy Matalon

- Theatrical poster
- Directed by: Eddy Matalon
- Written by: Eddy Matalon; Myra Clément; Alain Sens-Cazenave
- Produced by: Nicole Boisvert; Eddy Matalon
- Starring: Alan Scarfe; Beverly Murray; Randi Allen
- Cinematography: Jean-Jacques Tarbès
- Edited by: Laurent Quaglio; Pierre Rose; Micheline Thouin
- Music by: Didier Vasseur
- Production companies: Les Productions Agora; Maki Films
- Distributed by: Cinépix Film Properties
- Release dates: July 29, 1977 (Montreal); August 3, 1977 (France); November 11, 1977 (Vancouver)
- Running time: 88 minutes
- Countries: Canada; France
- Language: English
- Box office: $1.26 million

Cathy's Curse (French: Une si gentille petite fille, lit. 'Such a sweet little girl', released in Quebec as Cauchemares, 'Nightmares') is a 1977 supernatural horror film co-written, produced and directed by Eddy Matalon and starring Alan Scarfe, Beverly Murray, and Randi Allen. The film follows a young girl who is possessed by the spirit of her deceased aunt. A co-production between Canada and France, it was shot on location in Westmount and Montreal, Quebec.

Although the film was critically panned upon initial release, with many deriding it as being overly derivative of other supernatural horror films of the period including The Exorcist (1973), The Omen, and Carrie (both 1976), it has since become a cult classic, some calling the film "so bad it's good".

== Plot ==
In 1947, Robert Gimble flees with his young daughter, Laura, enraged to find that his wife has left with their son, George. Robert crashes their car into a snowbank, and he and Laura are burned alive in the car.

Thirty years later, George returns to his family home with his wife, Vivian, who is suffering from depression following a miscarriage, as well as the couple's eight-year-old daughter, Cathy. While exploring the home, Cathy uncovers an old doll along with a portrait of her aunt Laura in the attic. Meanwhile, Vivian becomes acquainted with the local neighbors, one of whom is a psychic medium who has a vision of Laura and her father's death while inside the home.

Cathy's behavior soon begins to change rapidly: She is cruel to the other neighborhood children, and exhibits destructive telekinetic powers. While home alone with Cathy, Mary, her nanny and housekeeper, dies after falling from a window. Cathy's violent and abusive behavior continues to alienate those around her, particularly her mother, who sinks deeper into a major depressive state. The psychic later visits the home, and finds Cathy in the attic. The psychic is confronted by a disturbing vision of herself, disfigured and burned. Later, Cathy tries to commit suicide by drowning herself in a river, but is saved by George.

George dismisses Vivian's fears that Cathy may be possessed or under the influence of supernatural forces connected to their house, dismissing the notions as delusions. One night, when George is away at work, a bedridden Vivian is left home alone with Cathy, who is watched by Paul, an elderly neighbor. Using her telekinetic powers, Cathy murders Paul, and Vivian subsequently discovers his disfigured corpse outside. Upstairs, she finds Cathy, covered in burn scars, who reveals herself to be Laura possessing Cathy's body. George, unable to contact Vivian or Paul by phone, returns to the house, where Cathy and Vivian are faced off in a confrontation. The three stare at one another, and Cathy grows tearful. Lying between them is the doll, impaled with a shard of glass.

== Cast ==
- Alan Scarfe as George Gimble
- Beverly Murray as Vivian Gimble
- Randi Allen as Cathy Gimble
- Dorothy Davis as Mary
- Mary Morter as Medium
- Roy Witham as Paul
- Sonny Forbes as Inspector O'Reilly
- Renée Girard as Ms. Burton
- Linda Koot as Laura
- Peter MacNeill as Robert Gimble
- Hubert Noël as The Doctor
- Bryce Allen and Lisa Nickelt as Cathy's friends

== Production ==
The film marked the first English-language feature by French director Eddy Matalon, who had previously directed music videos for Brigitte Bardot and several erotic films under the stage name 'Jack Angel'. It was filmed in on location in Westmount and Montreal, Quebec.

This was the sole acting role of child actress Randi Allen, who played the title character. In a 2015 interview with the blog Kindertraum, Allen stated she and her brother Bryce appeared in the movie to financially support their single mother.

== Release ==
=== Box office ===
The film was premiered in Montreal on July 29, 1977. A French-dubbed version was released in Quebec as Cauchemares ("Nightmares"). It was later given regional releases in Canada, opening in Vancouver, British Columbia on November 11, 1977, and opened in Ottawa, Ontario the following week, November 18, 1977. 21st Century Film Corporation acquired and distributed the film in the United States in 1980. Between Canada and the U.S., the film grossed a total of $1,261,228 in theatrical rentals.

=== Critical response ===
Barry Westgate of the Edmonton Journal derided the film for lacking cohesion, writing: "It doesn't have to make that much sense, done slickly. But Cathy's Curse squanders the licence, and its possibilities, with such insultingly careless abandon." The Ottawa Citizen's Noel Taylor deemed the film a "ho-hum shocker" and compared it negatively to The Omen (1976) and The Exorcist (1973), adding that, "it took three writers to come up with a screenplay in which the awfulness of the dialogue is only matched by the ineptness of the plotting."

The Calgary Albertan critic Louis B. Hobson noted that the film contained notable elements found in The Exorcist and The Bad Seed (1956), concluding that, "All this plagiarism might be forgivable if the acting were even remotely bearable."

TV Guide gave a negative review of the film, calling it a "dull Canadian Exorcist-inspired horror film .... [full of ] bloody mutilations, cheesy makeup, and inept special effects."

=== Home media ===
The film was released in April 2017 by Severin Films on Blu-ray with a restored print, and featuring both the 88-minute U.S. theatrical cut, as well as a 91-minute director's cut.

== Sources ==
- Aaros, Andrew A. (1986). A Title Guide to the Talkies, 1975 Through 1984. Lanham, Maryland: Scarecrow Press. ISBN 978-0-810-81868-2.
- Donahue, Suzanne Mary (1987). American Film Distribution: The Changing Marketplace. Ann Arbor, Michigan: UMI Research Press. ISBN 978-0-835-71776-2.
