= Hollis McLaren =

Canadian film and television actress

- Born: February 5, 1956 (age 70); Toronto, Ontario, Canada
- Education: University of Windsor (BA)
- Occupation: Actress
- Years active: 1972–present

Hollis McLaren (born February 5, 1956) is a Canadian film and television actress.

== Early life and education ==
McLaren was born in Toronto in 1956. She earned a Bachelor of Arts degree from the University of Windsor and studied drama at RADA in London.

== Career ==
McLaren is best known for her role in the 1977 cult film Outrageous! and its sequel Too Outrageous!, in which she played a character closely based on writer Margaret Gibson. She also had roles in the films Sudden Fury, Partners, Atlantic City, Jigsaw (L'Homme en colère) and Marion Bridge, as well as the television series Pit Pony and the television film Mom at Sixteen.

She was a Canadian Film Award nominee for Best Actress in 1977 for Outrageous!.

== Filmography ==
=== Film ===
Year	Title	Role	Notes
1974	Sunday in the Country	Lucy	
1975	Sudden Fury	Laura	
1976	Partners	Heather Grey	
1977	Welcome to Blood City	Martine	
1977	Outrageous!	Liza Connors	
1979	Jigsaw	Nancy	
1979	Lost and Found	Eden	
1980	Atlantic City	Chrissie	
1987	Too Outrageous!	Liza Connors	
2002	Marion Bridge	Chrissy	

=== Television ===
Year	Title	Role	Notes
1972, 1974	Dr. Simon Locke	Sally / Meter Maid	2 episodes
1978	Today I am a Fountain Pen	Annie	Television film
1980	The Littlest Hobo	Teri Wilcox	Episode: "The Hunt"
1981	Just Jessie	Jessie	Television film
1993	Life with Billy	Mami Burleigh	Television film
1994	Mary Silliman's War	Mrs. Jones	Television film
1998	Emily of New Moon	Alma McHugh	Episode: "The Tale of Duncan McHugh"
1999–2000	Pit Pony	Helen Borso	13 episodes
2003	Martha, Inc.: The Story of Martha Stewart	Big Martha	Television film
2003	The Elizabeth Smart Story	Wanda Barzee	Television film
2004	Gracie's Choice	Margaret	Television film
2004	Brave New Girl	Professor Roe	Television film
2004	Category 6: Day of Destruction	Helen Travers	Television film
2005	Vinegar Hill	Salome	Television film
2005	Mom at Sixteen	Marlene	Television film
2005	The Hunt for the BTK Killer	Helen	Television film
2008	The Circuit	Ms Simon	Television film
2022	Diggstown	Sister Mary Grace Locklin	Episode: "Donald Kitpu Christmas"
