= Allan Moyle =

Canadian film director (born 1947)

- Born: 1947 (age 78–79); Shawinigan, Quebec, Canada
- Occupations: Film director, actor, screenwriter
- Years active: 1974–present

Allan Moyle (born 1947) is a Canadian film director, writer, and actor. He is best known for directing the films Times Square (1980), Pump Up the Volume (1990), Empire Records (1995), and New Waterford Girl (1999) .

== Career ==
His first major film was Times Square (1980). During the editing of the film he clashed with producer Robert Stigwood who reportedly wanted dialogue scenes removed and replaced with more musical sequences, so that the accompanying soundtrack recording could be expanded to a double-album. Moyle refused to make the cuts so Stigwood fired him and made the cuts himself.

In the eighties he wrote a novel that was never published but became the basis for his screenplay of his movie Pump Up the Volume, which he also directed. It was released in 1990.

Moyle has since directed The Gun in Betty Lou's Handbag (1992), Empire Records (1995), New Waterford Girl (1999) - for which he won the Best Direction Canadian Comedy Award in 2001, XChange (2000), and the made-for-TV movies Jailbait (2000) and Man in the Mirror: The Michael Jackson Story (2004). His film, Weirdsville, debuted at and headlined the 2007 Slamdance Film Festival in January, the film's stars include Taryn Manning.

He is divorced from actress Dianna Miranda and currently married to Chiyoko Tanaka. He attended McGill University in Montreal and apprenticed at the New London Barn Theatre in New Hampshire.

== Filmography ==
- Montreal Main (1974, actor/writer)
- The Mourning Suit (1975, actor)
- East End Hustle (1976, actor/writer)
- Outrageous! (1977, actor)
- The Rubber Gun (1977) (director/co-writer, with Stephen Lack)
- Rabid (1977, actor)
- Times Square (1980) (director/story, with Leann Unger)
- Pump Up the Volume (1990) (director/writer)
- Red Blooded American Girl (1990) (writer)
- The Gun in Betty Lou's Handbag (1992) (director)
- Love Crimes (with Laurie Frank) (1992)
- The Thing Called Love (1993) (uncredited)
- Empire Records (1995) (director)
- Exhibit A: Secrets of Forensic Science (1997) (TV)
- New Waterford Girl (1999) (director)
- Jailbait (2000) (TV) (director)
- XChange (2000) (director)
- Say Nothing (2001) (director)
- Man in the Mirror: The Michael Jackson Story (2004) (TV) (director)
- Weirdsville (2007) (director)
