= Stephen Lack =

Canadian artist (born 1946)

- Born: January 1, 1946 (age 80); Montreal, Quebec, Canada
- Education: McGill University; Universidad de Guanajuato
- Occupations: Painter, sculptor, actor, screenwriter
- Years active: 1969–present
- Website: www.stephenlackart.com

Stephen Lack (born January 1, 1946) is a Canadian artist, actor and screenwriter. He is best known for his leading role in David Cronenberg's Scanners and Allan Moyle's The Rubber Gun, for which he was nominated for two Genie Awards.

== Early life and education ==
Lack was born in 1946 in Montreal, Quebec, Canada.

He earned a Bachelor of Arts in Psychology from McGill University in 1967, followed by a Master of Fine Arts in Sculpture at Universidad de Guanajuato, San Miguel de Allende, Mexico, in 1969.

== Career ==
Although he also produces drawings and sculpture, his primary medium is painting; he specializes in American scenes (urban, cultural, and landscapes) in a style that has been described as Neo-Expressionist. His art has won a number of awards and residencies.

He was artist in residence at Ancienne Manufacture Royale, Limoges, and Banff Institute of the Arts in 1988, Ford Motor Company, Dearborn, Michigan in 1989, and Connecticut College and Skidmore College in 1999. He received awards in the "Painting" category from the National Endowment for the Arts in 1987 and 1993, and the Canada Council for the Arts in 1991. In 2018, Xeno-Optic, with the assistance of the Research Services office at St. Thomas University in Canada, published There is a War, a 136-page text on the drawings of Stephen Lack, with an essay by Virgil Hammock and a foreword by Ronald Edsforth. The text reflects Lack's ability to see the world dominated by American conflicts as Goya saw his world in his work The Disasters of War, or Jacques Callot's Les Grandes Misères de la guerre (The Great Miseries of War).

The best-known films in which he appeared are Scanners in 1981 and Dead Ringers in 1988, but he has also appeared in cameo roles and independent films. Credits include Montreal Main (1974), The Rubber Gun (1978, which he also co-wrote with Allan Moyle, receiving nominations for Genie Awards for both Performance and Screenplay), Head On (a.k.a. Deadly Passion, 1980); Perfect Strangers (1984), and All the Vermeers in New York (1990).

== Awards ==
- National Endowment for the Arts "Painting" 1993; 1987
- Canada Council for the Arts; "Painting" 1991
- Print Magazine Regional Design Award 1985

== Personal life ==
He resides and works in New York City. He is the father of Asher Lack, front-man of the band Ravens & Chimes.

== Filmography ==
- Montreal Main (1974; also writer) – Steve
- The Angel and the Woman (1977) – Boss
- The Rubber Gun (1977; also writer) – Steve
- Head On (1980) – Peter Hill
- Scanners (1981) – Cameron Vale
- A 20th Century Chocolate Cake (1984)
- Perfect Strangers (1984) – Lt. Burns
- Dead Ringers (1988) – Anders Wolleck
- All the Vermeers in New York (1990) – Mark
- Ernstfall in Havanna (2002)
- Between the Temples (2024)

== Awards and nominations ==
- 1980 Genie Award for Best Performance by an Actor in a Leading Role: The Rubber Gun (nominated)
- 1980 Genie Award for Best Screenplay: The Rubber Gun (nominated)
