= Outrageous! =

- Promotional poster
- Directed by: Richard Benner
- Written by: Richard Benner
- Based on: "Making It" by Margaret Gibson
- Produced by: Bill Marshall; Peter O'Brian; Henk Van der Kolk
- Starring: Craig Russell; Hollis McLaren; Richert Easley
- Cinematography: James B. Kelly
- Edited by: George Appleby
- Music by: Paul Hoffert With Original Songs by Brenda Hoffert; Paul Hoffert
- Distributed by: Cinema 5 Distributing
- Release date: 1977
- Running time: 100 minutes
- Country: Canada
- Language: English
- Budget: $165,000

Outrageous! is a 1977 Canadian comedy-drama film written and directed by Richard Benner. The film stars Craig Russell as female impersonator Robin Turner, and Hollis McLaren as Turner's schizophrenic roommate Liza Conners. The plot begins in Toronto, with later scenes in New York City.

The film is based on "Making It", a short story by writer Margaret Gibson from her 1976 collection The Butterfly Ward; Russell and Gibson were roommates in real life.

Outrageous! was one of the first gay-themed films ever to receive widespread theatrical release in North America. The sequel Too Outrageous! was released in 1987. A stage musical that was adapted from the film was produced by Canadian Stage in 2000.

== Plot ==
Robin Turner is an inept hairdresser. He does hair and makeup for the local drag shows but longs to get up on stage himself. His best friend Liza is schizophrenic; she had been institutionalized but decided to leave the facility and be Robin's roommate.

Liza has a delusional episode in which she believes that "The Bonecrusher" from "The Other Place" is lying on top of her. Robin helps her push the Bonecrusher off and Liza tells him about the Other Place and her friend from there, Zara. Zara protects her from the Bonecrusher, who tells Liza that she is "the one born dead" and wants to take her to live in the Other Place forever.

A social worker visits Liza and they review Liza's lengthy list of medications. The social worker stresses that it would be very dangerous for Liza to become pregnant. When Robin comes home from work, Liza is excited that she was able to function with the social worker. Robin, however, is upset: a client had urged him to be adventurous with her hairstyle but then reacted badly when Robin styled her like Elizabeth Taylor in Cleopatra.

Robin and Liza meet Robin's friend Perry and Liza's friend from the institution, Martin. Martin seems to suffer from some form of paranoid delusions, believing that his eyes are turning Chinese and ranting about Mao Zedong. Perry and Robin discuss their costumes for an upcoming Halloween party. Perry decides to go as Karen Black as the flight attendant from Airport 1975. Liza suggests that Robin go as Tallulah Bankhead and agrees to make his dress.

Robin is a smash at the Halloween party, winning first prize in the costume contest, and offered the chance to perform regularly. His boss at the hair salon, a closet case who thinks women won't want to have their hair done by "fags", is at first reluctant to give Robin the time off to shop for fabric for new dresses but finally relents. Robin debuts at the club as Bette Davis, doing a routine mocking Joan Crawford's performances in Mildred Pierce, Autumn Leaves, and What Ever Happened to Baby Jane? while singing live rather than lip synching.

Meanwhile, Liza is continuing therapy. She keeps a journal of her thoughts and dreams and reads them for her psychiatrist, who suggests that she return to the institution. She adamantly refuses. Her doctor again cautions her to avoid pregnancy. Liza's lesbian editor friend Anne reads through Liza's journal and tells her that she might be able to sell some of her stories.

Robin continues to make appearances at the club, including a turn as Barbra Streisand, but loses his day job after a client complains to the salon owner. Liza, who is somewhat sexually promiscuous, has become pregnant. With bills piling up, Robin leaves Canada for New York City seeking success as a female impersonator. On his way to his first gig at the Jackrabbit Club, he meets Bob, a cab driver who was formerly a talent agent and agrees to allow Bob to represent him.

Robin performs "Diamonds Are a Girl's Best Friend" while rapidly changing drag personas, starting off as Carol Channing then transforming into Marlene Dietrich, Ethel Merman, Ella Fitzgerald, Pearl Bailey, and Bette Midler before concluding as Carol again. As an encore he performs "Give My Regards to Broadway" as Judy Garland. Robin is a triumph and books a regular slot at the club.

Liza enters the hospital to give birth; tragically, the baby is stillborn. She goes into a deep depression, calling Robin to tell him about the stillbirth and that she believes now that she is "the one born dead." Robin has Bob drive him to Canada to retrieve Liza. Together at his New York apartment, Liza remains completely withdrawn; Robin instructs Bob to get Liza ready for that night's show at the Jackrabbit.

At the club Robin performs as Peggy Lee, singing "It Ain't Easy" in this crazy world. Liza slowly begins to respond to her surroundings. Following the number, back in Robin's dressing room, Liza expresses how depressed and dead she feels. Robin assures her that she's alive, just crazy, and so is he, and that they need to embrace their madness. At first reluctant, she begins to smile and agree; Robin then pulls her out to the dance floor where they join the rest of the performers and patrons.

== Cast ==
- Craig Russell as Robin Turner
- Hollis McLaren as Liza Connors
- Richert Easley as Perry
- Allan Moyle as Martin
- David McIlwraith as Bob
- Gerry Salsberg as Jason
- Andrée Pelletier as Anne
- Helen Shaver as Jo
- Martha Gibson as Nurse Carr
- Helen Hughes as Mrs. Connors
- Jonah Royston as Dr. Beddoes
- Richard Moffatt as Stewart
- David Woito as Hustler
- Rusty Ryan as Jimmy
- Trevor Bryan as Miss Montego Bay
- Michael Ironside as Drunk

== Awards ==
The film was entered into the 28th Berlin International Film Festival, where Craig Russell won the Silver Bear for Best Actor. It received several Canadian Film Award nominations at the 28th Canadian Film Awards in 1977, including for Best Picture, Best Actor (Russell) and Best Actress (McLaren).

== Musical adaptation ==
Written by Brad Fraser and Joey Miller, the musical adaptation by Canadian Stage in 2000 cast Thom Allison as Robin Turner and Loretta Bailey as Liza Conners. One key change in the musical version was that Allison's multiracial heritage enabled Fraser and Miller to add Billie Holiday and Diana Ross to Robin Turner's repertoire of impersonations, thus allowing them to put a different spin on the character without entirely abandoning the original source material. The cast also included Tamara Bernier, Karen LeBlanc, Tim Howar and Ed Sahely.
