= Craig Russell (Canadian actor) =

Female impersonator, actor

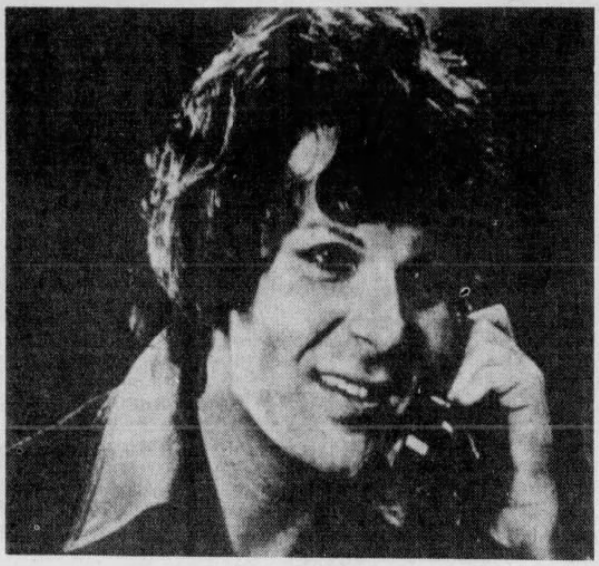
- Russell in 1977
- Born: Russell Craig Eadie; January 10, 1948; Toronto, Ontario, Canada
- Died: October 31, 1990 (aged 42); Toronto, Ontario, Canada
- Occupations: Female impersonator, actor
- Spouse: Lori Jenkins (m. 1982)

Russell Craig Eadie (January 10, 1948 – October 31, 1990), better known by his stage name Craig Russell, was a Canadian female impersonator and actor.

== Early life and career ==
Born in Toronto, Russell became president of Mae West's fan club as a teenager, and he briefly worked and lived in Los Angeles as her secretary. He returned to Toronto where he moved in with the writer Margaret Gibson. He worked as a hairdresser while pursuing his career as a stage entertainer. By 1971, he was a regular performer in Toronto gay clubs and had a burgeoning international following. He toured Las Vegas, Hollywood, San Francisco, Berlin, London, Paris, Amsterdam, Hamburg and Sydney.

His celebrity impersonations included Carol Channing, Bette Davis, Mae West, Barbra Streisand, Tallulah Bankhead, Marlene Dietrich, Bette Midler, Anita Bryant, Shirley Bassey, Peggy Lee and Judy Garland.

In 1977, Russell starred in the film Outrageous!, based on a short story written by Gibson about their time as roommates. The film was entered into the 28th Berlin International Film Festival, where Russell won the Silver Bear for Best Actor, and Russell was a Canadian Film Award nominee for Best Actor in 1977.

A decade later, in 1987, he starred in a sequel to Outrageous!, titled Too Outrageous!. Russell also released an album titled "Glamour Monster" in 1987 with the help of his manager and publicity agent Gino Empry, and multiple producers, so profits could contribute funds to AIDS research.

== Personal life ==
After struggling with the failure of several shows, mistakes, and mental health issues due to the commitment to the roles he played, Russell developed drug dependency and addiction issues involving cocaine, which eventually contributed to his downfall.

Russell fathered a daughter, Susan Allison ("Allison"). They developed a relationship in the years before his death. Although he publicly identified as gay rather than bisexual, Russell married his close friend Lori Jenkins in 1982. Before his marriage to Jenkins, he engaged in various serious relationships with both men and women.

Russell remained married to Lori until his death in 1990. A play titled Margaret and Craig, written by David Solomon, based on the writing of both Russell and Gibson, was in development. The play was produced in workshop at Vassar College's Powerhouse Theater in Summer 2011 with Mario Cantone as Russell and Jeni Verdon as Gibson.

In 2020, Brian Bradley published the biography Outrageous Misifts: Female Impersonator Craig Russell and His Wife, Lori Russell Eadie.

== Filmography ==
=== Film ===
Year	Title	Role	Notes
1977	Outrageous!	Robin Turner	
1980	Nothing Personal	Talk Show Guest	
1986	A Virus Knows No Morals	Barkeeper	
1987	Too Outrageous!	Robin Turner	

=== Television ===
Year	Title	Role	Notes
1974	The Streets of San Francisco	Performer	Episode: "Mask of Death"
1974	The Merv Griffin Show	Self; celebrity female impersonator	Episode: "Joan Rivers, Craig Russell, Tony Sheen"
1977	Emerald City	Self; celebrity female impersonator	Episode: "September, 1978"
1979	The Alan Hamel Show	Self; celebrity female impersonator	2 episodes
1981	Trapper John, M.D.	Judy	Episode: "Straight and Narrow"
1996	Life and Times	Himself	Episode: "The Life and Times of Craig Russell"
2020	American Masters	Himself	Episode: "Mae West: Dirty Blonde"; archival footage
