= Canadian Screen Award for Best Motion Picture =

Annual Canadian film award

- Awarded for: Excellence in cinema
- Country: Canada
- Presented by: Academy of Canadian Cinema & Television
- First award: 1949
- Currently held by: Nirvanna the Band the Show the Movie (2025)
- Website: academy.ca/awards

The Academy of Canadian Cinema and Television presents an annual award for Best Motion Picture to the best Canadian film of the year.

The award was first presented in 1949 by the Canadian Film Awards under the title Film of the Year. Due to the economics of Canadian film production, however, most Canadian films made in this era were documentaries or short films rather than full-length narrative feature films. In some years, a Film of the Year award was not formally presented, with the highest film award presented that year being in the Theatrical Short or Amateur Film categories.

In 1964, the Canadian Film Awards introduced an award for Best Feature Film. For the remainder of the 1960s, the two awards were presented alongside each other to different films, except in 1965 when a Feature Film was named and a Film of the Year was not, and in 1967 when the same film was named the winner of both categories. After 1970, however, the Film of the Year category was no longer used except in 1975, when due to the cancellation of the awards in 1974, it was presented alongside the Feature Film category as a de facto second Best Picture award, so that winners for both 1974 and 1975 could be named.

As of 1980, the award was taken over by the Academy of Canadian Cinema and Television and presented as part of the Genie Awards ceremony; as of 2013, it is presented as part of the Canadian Screen Awards.

== Film of the Year (1949–1975) ==
=== 1940s ===
Year	Film	Producers	Ref
1949; 1st Canadian Film Awards
1949; 1st Canadian Film Awards	The Loon's Necklace	F. R. Crawley	

=== 1950s ===
Year	Film	Producers	Ref
1950; 2nd Canadian Film Awards
1950; 2nd Canadian Film Awards	No award presented		
1951; 3rd Canadian Film Awards
1951; 3rd Canadian Film Awards	No award presented		
1952; 4th Canadian Film Awards
1952; 4th Canadian Film Awards	Newfoundland Scene	F. R. Crawley	
1953; 5th Canadian Film Awards
1953; 5th Canadian Film Awards	Tit-Coq	Gratien Gélinas	
1954; 6th Canadian Film Awards
1954; 6th Canadian Film Awards	The Seasons	Christopher Chapman	
1955; 7th Canadian Film Awards
1955; 7th Canadian Film Awards	The Stratford Adventure	Guy Glover	
1956; 8th Canadian Film Awards
1956; 8th Canadian Film Awards	No award presented		
1957; 9th Canadian Film Awards
1957; 9th Canadian Film Awards	No award presented		
1958; 10th Canadian Film Awards
1958; 10th Canadian Film Awards	City of Gold	Tom Daly, Colin Low, Wolf Koenig	
1959; 11th Canadian Film Awards
1959; 11th Canadian Film Awards	No award presented		

=== 1960s ===
Year	Film	Producers	Ref
1960; 12th Canadian Film Awards
1960; 12th Canadian Film Awards	No award presented		
1961; 13th Canadian Film Awards
1961; 13th Canadian Film Awards	Universe	Tom Daly, Colin Low, Roman Kroitor	
1962; 14th Canadian Film Awards
1962; 14th Canadian Film Awards	No award presented		
1963; 15th Canadian Film Awards
1963; 15th Canadian Film Awards	Lonely Boy	Roman Kroitor, Wolf Koenig	
1964; 16th Canadian Film Awards
1964; 16th Canadian Film Awards	Pour la suite du monde	Fernand Dansereau, Pierre Perrault, Jacques Bobet	
1965; 17th Canadian Film Awards
1965; 17th Canadian Film Awards	No award presented		
1966; 18th Canadian Film Awards
1966; 18th Canadian Film Awards	The Mills of the Gods: Viet Nam	Beryl Fox, Douglas Leiterman	
1967; 19th Canadian Film Awards
1967; 19th Canadian Film Awards	Warrendale	Allan King, Patrick Watson	
1968; 20th Canadian Film Awards
1968; 20th Canadian Film Awards	A Place to Stand	Christopher Chapman, David Mackay	
1969; 21st Canadian Film Awards
1969; 21st Canadian Film Awards	The Best Damn Fiddler from Calabogie to Kaladar	John Kemeny, Barrie Howells	

=== 1970s ===
Year	Film	Producers	Ref
1970; 22nd Canadian Film Awards
1970; 22nd Canadian Film Awards	To See Or Not to See (Psychocratie)	Robert Verral, Wolf Koenig	
1971; 23rd Canadian Film Awards
1971; 23rd Canadian Film Awards	No award presented		
1972; 24th Canadian Film Awards
1972; 24th Canadian Film Awards	No award presented		
1973; 25th Canadian Film Awards
1973; 25th Canadian Film Awards	No award presented		
1974; Award presented in 1975
1974; Award presented in 1975	The Apprenticeship of Duddy Kravitz	John Kemeny	
1975; 26th Canadian Film Awards
1975; 26th Canadian Film Awards	Orders (Les Ordres)	Gui Caron, Bernard Lalonde	

== Best Feature Film (1964–1978) ==
=== 1960s ===
Year	Film	Filmmaker/s	Ref
1964; 16th Canadian Film Awards
1964; 16th Canadian Film Awards	À tout prendre (aka All Things Considered aka Take it All)	Claude Jutra, Robert Hershorn	
1964; 16th Canadian Film Awards	Amanita Pestilens	F. R. Crawley, René Bonnière	
1964; 16th Canadian Film Awards	Trouble-Maker (Trouble fête)	Jean Roy, Roger Blais, Pierre Patry	
1965; 17th Canadian Film Awards
1965; 17th Canadian Film Awards	The Luck of Ginger Coffey	Leon Roth, Irvin Kershner	
1965; 17th Canadian Film Awards	The Cat in the Bag (Le Chat dans le sac)	Jacques Bobet	
1965; 17th Canadian Film Awards	Nobody Waved Good-bye	Roman Kroitor, Don Owen	
1965; 17th Canadian Film Awards	Sweet Substitute	Larry Kent	
1966; 18th Canadian Film Awards
1966; 18th Canadian Film Awards	Mission of Fear (Le Festin des morts)	André Belleau, Fernand Dansereau	
1967; 19th Canadian Film Awards
1967; 19th Canadian Film Awards	Warrendale	Allan King	
1968; 20th Canadian Film Awards
1968; 20th Canadian Film Awards	The Ernie Game	Robert Allen, Gordon Burwash	
1968; 20th Canadian Film Awards	It Isn't Jacques Cartier's Fault (C'est pas la faute à Jacques Cartier)	Georges Dufaux, Clément Perron	
1968; 20th Canadian Film Awards	Kid Sentiment	Clément Perron	
1968; 20th Canadian Film Awards	The Man Who Wanted Nothing	Mary Walker-Sawka, Paul Sawka	
1968; 20th Canadian Film Awards	The Paper People	David Gardner	
1968; 20th Canadian Film Awards	The Times That Are (Le Règne du jour)	Guy L. Coté, Jacques Bobet	
1968; 20th Canadian Film Awards	Waiting for Caroline	Walford Hewitson	
1969; 21st Canadian Film Awards
1969; 21st Canadian Film Awards	Not awarded		

=== 1970s ===
Year	Film	Producers	Ref
1970; 22nd Canadian Film Awards
1970; 22nd Canadian Film Awards	Goin' Down the Road	Donald Shebib	
1970; 22nd Canadian Film Awards	The Act of the Heart	Paul Almond, Jennings Lang	
1970; 22nd Canadian Film Awards	A Danger to Society (Danger pour la société)	Jean Martimbeau	
1970; 22nd Canadian Film Awards	Here and Now (L'Initiation)	John Dunning	
1970; 22nd Canadian Film Awards	Homer	Terence Dene, Steven North	
1970; 22nd Canadian Film Awards	The House of Light (La chambre blanche)	Marguerite Duparc	
1970; 22nd Canadian Film Awards	The Johari Window	Carleton University	
1970; 22nd Canadian Film Awards	The Last Act of Martin Weston	Michael Jacot	
1970; 22nd Canadian Film Awards	Love in a Four Letter World	Arthur Veronka, John Dunning, André Link	
1970; 22nd Canadian Film Awards	Prologue	Tom Daly, Robin Spry	
1970; 22nd Canadian Film Awards	Q-Bec My Love	Marguerite Duparc	
1970; 22nd Canadian Film Awards	Rainy Day Woman	John Roston	
1970; 22nd Canadian Film Awards	Red	Pierre Lamy	
1970; 22nd Canadian Film Awards	Wow	Claude Jutra, Robert Forget	
1971; 23rd Canadian Film Awards
1971; 23rd Canadian Film Awards	Mon oncle Antoine	Marc Beaudet	
1971; 23rd Canadian Film Awards	The Apprentice (Fleur bleue)	Donald Brittain	
1971; 23rd Canadian Film Awards	Fortune and Men's Eyes	Lewis M. Allen, Lester Persky	
1971; 23rd Canadian Film Awards	Foxy Lady	Ivan Reitman	
1971; 23rd Canadian Film Awards	I'm Going to Get You, Elliott Boy	Ron Slutker	
1971; 23rd Canadian Film Awards	The Life and Times of Chester-Angus Ramsgood	David Curnick	
1971; 23rd Canadian Film Awards	The Only Thing You Know	Clarke Mackey	
1971; 23rd Canadian Film Awards	The Proud Rider	George Fras	
1971; 23rd Canadian Film Awards	The Reincarnate	Seeleg Lester	
1971; 23rd Canadian Film Awards	Rip-Off	Donald Shebib, Bennett Fode	
1971; 23rd Canadian Film Awards	Tiki Tiki	Gerald Potterton	
1972; 24th Canadian Film Awards
1972; 24th Canadian Film Awards	Wedding in White	John Vidette	
1972; 24th Canadian Film Awards	The Conquest (La Conquête)	Jacques Gagné	
1972; 24th Canadian Film Awards	The Doves (Les Colombes)	Pierre David, Jean-Claude Lord	
1972; 24th Canadian Film Awards	Dream Life (La Vie rêvée)	Guy Bergeron	
1972; 24th Canadian Film Awards	Face-Off	John F. Bassett	
1972; 24th Canadian Film Awards	IXE-13	Pierre Gauvreau	
1972; 24th Canadian Film Awards	Journey	Paul Almond	
1972; 24th Canadian Film Awards	The Merry Wives of Tobias Rouke	John Board, Stan Feldman, Samuel C. Jephcott	
1972; 24th Canadian Film Awards	Montreal Blues	Jean Dansereau	
1972; 24th Canadian Film Awards	Proxyhawks	Jack Darcus	
1972; 24th Canadian Film Awards	The Rebels (Quelques arpents de neige)	Claude Héroux	
1972; 24th Canadian Film Awards	The Rowdyman	Lawrence Dane	
1972; 24th Canadian Film Awards	The Time of the Hunt (Le Temps d'une chasse)	Pierre Gauvreau	
1972; 24th Canadian Film Awards	The True Nature of Bernadette (La Vraie nature de Bernadette)	Gilles Carle, Pierre Lamy	
1972; 24th Canadian Film Awards	Voulez-vous coucher avec God?	Jack Christie, Michael Hirsh	
1972; 24th Canadian Film Awards	The Wise Guys (Les Smattes)	Pierre Lamy	
1973; 25th Canadian Film Awards
1973; 25th Canadian Film Awards	Slipstream	James Margellos	
1973; 25th Canadian Film Awards	Between Friends	Chalmers Adams	
1973; 25th Canadian Film Awards	Kamouraska	Mag Bodard, Pierre Lamy	
1973; 25th Canadian Film Awards	Paperback Hero	John F. Bassett, James Margellos	
1973; 25th Canadian Film Awards	Réjeanne Padovani	Marguerite Duparc	
1974
1974	Not awarded		
1975; 26th Canadian Film Awards
1975; 26th Canadian Film Awards	Orders (Les Ordres)	Gui Caron, Bernard Lalonde	
1975; 26th Canadian Film Awards	125 Rooms of Comfort	Don Haig	
1975; 26th Canadian Film Awards	The Apprenticeship of Duddy Kravitz	John Kemeny	
1975; 26th Canadian Film Awards	Black Christmas	Bob Clark	
1975; 26th Canadian Film Awards	Child Under a Leaf	Robert Baylis, Murray Shostak	
1975; 26th Canadian Film Awards	Eliza's Horoscope	Gordon Sheppard	
1975; 26th Canadian Film Awards	Lions for Breakfast	Anthony Kramreither	
1975; 26th Canadian Film Awards	Monkeys in the Attic	Morley Markson	
1975; 26th Canadian Film Awards	A Quiet Day in Belfast	Milad Bessada	
1975; 26th Canadian Film Awards	Sudden Fury	Lawrence J. Caza	
1975; 26th Canadian Film Awards	Why Rock the Boat?	William Weintraub	
1976; 27th Canadian Film Awards
1976; 27th Canadian Film Awards	Lies My Father Told Me	Anthony Bedrich, Harry Gulkin	
1976; 27th Canadian Film Awards	Before the Time Comes (Le Temps de l'avant)	Anne Claire Poirier	
1976; 27th Canadian Film Awards	Bound for Glory (Partis pour la gloire)	Marc Beaudet	
1976; 27th Canadian Film Awards	Brethren	Chalmers Adams, Dennis Zahoruk	
1976; 27th Canadian Film Awards	The Far Shore	Pierre Lamy, Judy Steed, Joyce Wieland	
1976; 27th Canadian Film Awards	Goldenrod	Gerry Arbeld, Lionel Chetwynd	
1976; 27th Canadian Film Awards	Normande (La tête de Normande St-Onge)	Gilles Carle	
1976; 27th Canadian Film Awards	Partners	Don Owen, Chalmers Adams	
1976; 27th Canadian Film Awards	Second Wind	James Margellos	
1977; 28th Canadian Film Awards
1977; 28th Canadian Film Awards	J.A. Martin Photographer (J.A. Martin photographe)	Jean-Marc Garand	
1977; 28th Canadian Film Awards	One Man	Tom Daly, Michael J. F. Scott	
1977; 28th Canadian Film Awards	Outrageous!	Bill Marshall, Peter O'Brian, Henk Van der Kolk	
1977; 28th Canadian Film Awards	Why Shoot the Teacher?	Lawrence T. Hertzog	
1978; 29th Canadian Film Awards
1978; 29th Canadian Film Awards	The Silent Partner	Joel B. Michaels, Stephen Young	
1978; 29th Canadian Film Awards	Blood and Guts	Peter O'Brian	
1978; 29th Canadian Film Awards	In Praise of Older Women	Robert Lantos, Claude Héroux	
1978; 29th Canadian Film Awards	Three Card Monte	Rob Iveson, Richard Gabourie	

== Best Motion Picture (1980–present) ==
=== 1980s ===
Year	Film	Producers	Ref
1980; 1st Genie Awards
1980; 1st Genie Awards	The Changeling	Garth Drabinsky, Joel B. Michaels	
1980; 1st Genie Awards	Cordélia	Jean-Marc Garand, Jacques Gagné, Roger Frappier	
1980; 1st Genie Awards	Klondike Fever	Gilbert W. Taylor, Peter Welbeck	
1980; 1st Genie Awards	Meatballs	Daniel Goldberg, John Dunning, André Link	
1980; 1st Genie Awards	Running	Robert M. Cooper, John M. Eckert, Ronald I. Cohen	
1981; 2nd Genie Awards
1981; 2nd Genie Awards	Good Riddance (Les Bons débarras)	Claude Godbout, Marcia Couelle	
1981; 2nd Genie Awards	The Handyman (L'Homme à tout faire)	René Malo	
1981; 2nd Genie Awards	The Hounds of Notre Dame	Fil Fraser	
1981; 2nd Genie Awards	The Lucky Star	André Fleury, Claude Léger	
1981; 2nd Genie Awards	Tribute	Joel B. Michaels, Garth Drabinsky	
1982; 3rd Genie Awards
1982; 3rd Genie Awards	Ticket to Heaven	Ronald I. Cohen, Vivienne Leebosh	
1982; 3rd Genie Awards	The Amateur	Garth Drabinsky, Joel B. Michaels	
1982; 3rd Genie Awards	Heartaches	David Patterson, Jerry Raibourn	
1982; 3rd Genie Awards	The Plouffe Family (Les Plouffe)	Justine Héroux, Denis Héroux	
1982; 3rd Genie Awards	Scanners	Victor Solnicki, Pierre David, Claude Héroux	
1983; 4th Genie Awards
1983; 4th Genie Awards	The Grey Fox	Peter O'Brian	
1983; 4th Genie Awards	A Day in a Taxi (Une journée en taxi)	Robert Ménard	
1983; 4th Genie Awards	Harry Tracy, Desperado	Ronald I. Cohen	
1983; 4th Genie Awards	Quest for Fire (La Guerre du feu)	Denis Héroux, John Kemeny	
1983; 4th Genie Awards	Threshold	Jon Slan, Michael Burns	
1984; 5th Genie Awards
1984; 5th Genie Awards	The Terry Fox Story	Robert M. Cooper	
1984; 5th Genie Awards	A Christmas Story	Bob Clark, René Dupont	
1984; 5th Genie Awards	Lucien Brouillard	René Gueissaz, Marc Daigle	
1984; 5th Genie Awards	Maria Chapdelaine	Murray Shostak, Robert Baylis	
1984; 5th Genie Awards	The Wars	Richard Neilson	
1985; 6th Genie Awards
1985; 6th Genie Awards	The Bay Boy	Denis Héroux, John Kemeny	
1985; 6th Genie Awards	The Dog Who Stopped the War (La Guerre des tuques)	Nicole Robert, Rock Demers	
1985; 6th Genie Awards	A Woman in Transit (La Femme de l'hôtel)	Bernadette Payeur	
1985; 6th Genie Awards	Mario	Jean Beaudin, Hélène Verrier	
1986; 7th Genie Awards
1986; 7th Genie Awards	My American Cousin	Peter O'Brian	
1986; 7th Genie Awards	The Alley Cat (Le Matou)	Justine Héroux	
1986; 7th Genie Awards	Joshua Then and Now	Robert Lantos, Stephen J. Roth	
1986; 7th Genie Awards	90 Days	David Wilson, Giles Walker	
1986; 7th Genie Awards	One Magic Christmas	Peter O'Brian	
1987; 8th Genie Awards
1987; 8th Genie Awards	The Decline of the American Empire (Le Déclin de l'empire américain)	Roger Frappier, René Malo	
1987; 8th Genie Awards	Dancing in the Dark	Anthony Kramreither	
1987; 8th Genie Awards	Intimate Power (Pouvoir intime)	Claude Bonin	
1987; 8th Genie Awards	John and the Missus	John Hunter, Peter O'Brian	
1987; 8th Genie Awards	Loyalties	Ronald Lillie, William Johnston	
1988; 9th Genie Awards
1988; 9th Genie Awards	Night Zoo (Un Zoo la nuit)	Roger Frappier, Pierre Gendron	
1988; 9th Genie Awards	Family Viewing	Atom Egoyan	
1988; 9th Genie Awards	I've Heard the Mermaids Singing	Patricia Rozema, Alexandra Raffe	
1988; 9th Genie Awards	Life Classes	Stephen Reynolds	
1988; 9th Genie Awards	Train of Dreams	Sam Grana	
1989; 10th Genie Awards
1989; 10th Genie Awards	Dead Ringers	David Cronenberg, Marc Boyman	
1989; 10th Genie Awards	The Outside Chance of Maximilian Glick	Stephen Foster	
1989; 10th Genie Awards	The Revolving Doors (Les Portes tournantes)	Francyne Morin, René Malo	
1989; 10th Genie Awards	Straight for the Heart (À corps perdu)	Robin Spry, Denise Robert	
1989; 10th Genie Awards	A Winter Tan	Aerlyn Weissman, John Frizzell, Louise Clark, Jackie Burroughs, John Walker	

=== 1990s ===
Year	Film	Producers	Ref
1990; 11th Genie Awards
1990; 11th Genie Awards	Jesus of Montreal (Jésus de Montréal)	Roger Frappier, Pierre Gendron	
1990; 11th Genie Awards	Bye Bye Blues	Arvi Liimatainen, Anne Wheeler	
1990; 11th Genie Awards	Cold Comfort	Ray Sager, Ilana Frank	
1990; 11th Genie Awards	Speaking Parts	Atom Egoyan	
1990; 11th Genie Awards	Termini Station	Allan King	
1991; 12th Genie Awards
1991; 12th Genie Awards	Black Robe	Robert Lantos, Sue Milliken, Stéphane Reichel	
1991; 12th Genie Awards	Chaindance	Richard Davis	
1991; 12th Genie Awards	The Company of Strangers	David Wilson	
1991; 12th Genie Awards	An Imaginary Tale (Une histoire inventée)	Claudio Luca, Robin Spry	
1991; 12th Genie Awards	Perfectly Normal	Michael Burns	
1992; 13th Genie Awards
1992; 13th Genie Awards	Naked Lunch	Gabriella Martinelli, Jeremy Thomas	
1992; 13th Genie Awards	Being at Home with Claude	Louise Gendron	
1992; 13th Genie Awards	Léolo	Aimée Danis, Lyse Lafontaine	
1992; 13th Genie Awards	Requiem for a Handsome Bastard (Requiem pour un beau sans-cœur)	Nicole Robert, Lorraine Dufour	
1992; 13th Genie Awards	The Saracen Woman (La Sarrasine)	Marc Daigle, Lise Abastado	
1993; 14th Genie Awards
1993; 14th Genie Awards	Thirty Two Short Films About Glenn Gould	Niv Fichman	
1993; 14th Genie Awards	La Florida	Pierre Sarrazin, Claude Bonin	
1993; 14th Genie Awards	Harmony Cats	Richard Davis, Alan Morinis	
1993; 14th Genie Awards	The Lotus Eaters	Sharon McGowan	
1993; 14th Genie Awards	The Sex of the Stars (Le Sexe des étoiles)	Pierre Gendron, Jean-Roch Marcotte	
1994; 15th Genie Awards
1994; 15th Genie Awards	Exotica	Atom Egoyan, Camelia Frieberg	
1994; 15th Genie Awards	Double Happiness	Rose Lam Waddell, Stephen Hegyes	
1994; 15th Genie Awards	Louis 19, King of the Airwaves (Louis 19, le roi des ondes)	Jacques Dorfmann, Richard Sadler	
1994; 15th Genie Awards	My Friend Max (Mon amie Max)	Aimée Danis, Danièle Bussy	
1994; 15th Genie Awards	Whale Music	Raymond Massey, Steven DeNure	
1995; 16th Genie Awards
1995; 16th Genie Awards	The Confessional (Le Confessionnal)	Denise Robert	
1995; 16th Genie Awards	Black List (Liste noire)	Marcel Giroux	
1995; 16th Genie Awards	Magic in the Water	Rick Stevenson, Matthew O'Connor	
1995; 16th Genie Awards	Margaret's Museum	Christopher Zimmer, Mort Ransen, Claudio Luca, Steve Clark-Hall	
1995; 16th Genie Awards	Rude	Damon D'Oliveira, Karen King	
1996; 17th Genie Awards
1996; 17th Genie Awards	Lilies (Les feluettes)	Robin Cass, Arnie Gelbart, Anna Stratton	
1996; 17th Genie Awards	Crash	David Cronenberg	
1996; 17th Genie Awards	Hard Core Logo	Brian Dennis, Christine Haebler	
1996; 17th Genie Awards	Long Day's Journey into Night	Niv Fichman, Daniel Iron	
1996; 17th Genie Awards	Polygraph (Le Polygraphe)	Philippe Carcassonne, Bruno Jobin, Jean-Pierre St-Michel, Ulrich Felsberg	
1997; 18th Genie Awards
1997; 18th Genie Awards	The Sweet Hereafter	Atom Egoyan, Camelia Frieberg	
1997; 18th Genie Awards	Cosmos	Roger Frappier	
1997; 18th Genie Awards	The Hanging Garden	Thom Fitzgerald, Louise Garfield, Arnie Gelbart	
1997; 18th Genie Awards	Karmina	Nicole Robert	
1997; 18th Genie Awards	Kissed	Dean English, Lynne Stopkewich	
1998; 19th Genie Awards
1998; 19th Genie Awards	The Red Violin (Le Violon rouge)	Niv Fichman	
1998; 19th Genie Awards	Last Night	Daniel Iron, Niv Fichman	
1998; 19th Genie Awards	Regeneration	Allan Scott, Peter R. Simpson	
1998; 19th Genie Awards	Rupert's Land	Bill Thumm, Scott Kennedy	
1998; 19th Genie Awards	Such a Long Journey	Paul Stephens, Simon MacCorkindale	
1999; 20th Genie Awards
1999; 20th Genie Awards	Sunshine	Robert Lantos, András Hámori	
1999; 20th Genie Awards	eXistenZ	Robert Lantos, David Cronenberg, András Hámori	
1999; 20th Genie Awards	Felicia's Journey	Bruce Davey	
1999; 20th Genie Awards	The Five Senses	Camelia Frieberg, Jeremy Podeswa	
1999; 20th Genie Awards	Winter Stories (Histoires d'hiver)	Claude Gagnon, Yuri Yoshimura-Gagnon	
1999; 20th Genie Awards	Post Mortem	Lorraine Dufour	

=== 2000s ===
Year	Film	Producers	Ref
2000; 21st Genie Awards
2000; 21st Genie Awards	Maelström	Roger Frappier, Luc Vandal	
2000; 21st Genie Awards	Love Come Down	Eric Jordan, Damon D'Oliveira, Clément Virgo	
2000; 21st Genie Awards	New Waterford Girl	Jennifer Kawaja, Julia Sereny	
2000; 21st Genie Awards	Possible Worlds	Sandra Cunningham, Bruno Jobin	
2000; 21st Genie Awards	Stardom	Denise Robert, Robert Lantos	
2000; 21st Genie Awards	To Walk with Lions	Pieter Kroonenburg, Julie Allan	
2001; 22nd Genie Awards
2001; 22nd Genie Awards	Atanarjuat: The Fast Runner	Norman Cohn, Paul Apak Angilirq, Zacharias Kunuk, Germaine Wong	
2001; 22nd Genie Awards	Eisenstein	Martin Paul-Hus, Regine Schmid	
2001; 22nd Genie Awards	Soft Shell Man (Un crabe dans la tête)	Joseph Hillel, Luc Déry	
2001; 22nd Genie Awards	Treed Murray	Helen Du Toit	
2001; 22nd Genie Awards	The War Bride	Alistair MacLean-Clark, Douglas Berquist	
2002; 23rd Genie Awards
2002; 23rd Genie Awards	Ararat	Robert Lantos, Atom Egoyan	
2002; 23rd Genie Awards	Bollywood/Hollywood	David Hamilton, Robert Wertheimer	
2002; 23rd Genie Awards	Québec-Montréal	Nicole Robert	
2002; 23rd Genie Awards	Rare Birds	Paul Pope, Janet York	
2002; 23rd Genie Awards	Suddenly Naked	Gavin Wilding	
2003; 24th Genie Awards
2003; 24th Genie Awards	The Barbarian Invasions (Les Invasions barbares)	Denise Robert, Daniel Louis, Fabienne Vonier	
2003; 24th Genie Awards	Far Side of the Moon (La Face cachée de la lune)	Bob Krupinski, Mario St-Laurent	
2003; 24th Genie Awards	Owning Mahowny	András Hámori, Alessandro Camon, Seaton McLean	
2003; 24th Genie Awards	Seducing Doctor Lewis (La Grande séduction)	Roger Frappier, Luc Vandal	
2003; 24th Genie Awards	The Snow Walker	Rob Merilees, William Vince	
2004; 25th Genie Awards
2004; 25th Genie Awards	The Triplets of Belleville (Les Triplettes de Belleville)	Paul Cadieux	
2004; 25th Genie Awards	Being Julia	Robert Lantos	
2004; 25th Genie Awards	Bittersweet Memories (Ma vie en cinémascope)	Denise Robert, Daniel Louis	
2004; 25th Genie Awards	Looking for Alexander (Mémoires affectives)	Barbara Shrier	
2004; 25th Genie Awards	Love, Sex and Eating the Bones	Jennifer Holness	
2005; 26th Genie Awards
2005; 26th Genie Awards	C.R.A.Z.Y.	Pierre Even, Jean-Marc Vallée	
2005; 26th Genie Awards	Familia	Luc Déry	
2005; 26th Genie Awards	It's All Gone Pete Tong	Elizabeth Yake, Allan Niblo, James Richardson	
2005; 26th Genie Awards	Saint Ralph	Michael Souther, Teza Lawrence, Andrea Mann, Seaton McLean	
2005; 26th Genie Awards	Water	David Hamilton	
2006; 27th Genie Awards
2006; 27th Genie Awards	Bon Cop, Bad Cop	Kevin Tierney	
2006; 27th Genie Awards	The Little Book of Revenge (Guide de la petit vengeance)	Roger Frappier, Luc Vandal	
2006; 27th Genie Awards	The Rocket (Maurice Richard)	Denise Robert, Daniel Louis	
2006; 27th Genie Awards	A Sunday in Kigali (Un dimanche à Kigali)	Lyse Lafontaine, Michael Mosca	
2006; 27th Genie Awards	Trailer Park Boys: The Movie	Barrie Dunn, Mike Clattenburg, Michael Volpe	
2007; 28th Genie Awards
2007; 28th Genie Awards	Away from Her	Daniel Iron, Simone Urdl, Jennifer Weiss	
2007; 28th Genie Awards	Continental, a Film Without Guns (Continental, un film sans fusil)	Luc Déry, Kim McCraw	
2007; 28th Genie Awards	Days of Darkness (L'Âge des ténèbres)	Denise Robert, Daniel Louis	
2007; 28th Genie Awards	Eastern Promises	Robert Lantos, Paul Webster	
2007; 28th Genie Awards	Shake Hands With the Devil	Laszlo Barna, Michael Donovan	
2008; 29th Genie Awards
2008; 29th Genie Awards	Passchendaele	Niv Fichman, Francis Damberger, Paul Gross, Frank Siracusa	
2008; 29th Genie Awards	Amal	David Miller, Steven Bray	
2008; 29th Genie Awards	Everything Is Fine (Tout est parfait)	Nicole Robert	
2008; 29th Genie Awards	The Necessities of Life (Ce qu'il faut pour vivre)	Bernadette Payeur, René Chénier	
2008; 29th Genie Awards	Normal	Andrew Boutilier, Carl Bessai	
2009; 30th Genie Awards
2009; 30th Genie Awards	Polytechnique	Maxime Rémillard, Don Carmody	
2009; 30th Genie Awards	Before Tomorrow (Le jour avant le lendemain)	Stéphane Rituit	
2009; 30th Genie Awards	Fifty Dead Men Walking	Shawn Williamson, Stephen Hegyes, Peter La Terriere, Kari Skogland	
2009; 30th Genie Awards	Nurse.Fighter.Boy	Ingrid Veninger	
2009; 30th Genie Awards	3 Seasons (3 saisons)	Maude Bouchard, Jim Donovan, Sandy Martinez, Bruno Rosato	

=== 2010s ===
Year	Film	Producers	Ref
2010; 31st Genie Awards
2010; 31st Genie Awards	Incendies	Luc Déry, Kim McCraw	
2010; 31st Genie Awards	Barney's Version	Robert Lantos	
2010; 31st Genie Awards	Heartbeats (Les Amours imaginaires)	Carole Mondello, Xavier Dolan, Daniel Morin	
2010; 31st Genie Awards	Splice	Steven Hoban	
2010; 31st Genie Awards	10½	Pierre Gendron	
2011; 32nd Genie Awards
2011; 32nd Genie Awards	Monsieur Lazhar	Luc Déry, Kim McCraw	
2011; 32nd Genie Awards	Café de Flore	Jean-Marc Vallée, Marie-Claude Poulin, Pierre Even	
2011; 32nd Genie Awards	A Dangerous Method	Jeremy Thomas, Marco Mehlitz, Martin Katz	
2011; 32nd Genie Awards	Starbuck	André Rouleau	
2011; 32nd Genie Awards	The Whistleblower	Celine Rattray, Christina Piovesan	
2012; 1st Canadian Screen Awards
2012; 1st Canadian Screen Awards	War Witch (Rebelle)	Pierre Even, Marie-Claude Poulin	
2012; 1st Canadian Screen Awards	L'Affaire Dumont	Nicole Robert	
2012; 1st Canadian Screen Awards	Inch'Allah	Luc Déry, Kim McCraw, Stephen Traynor	
2012; 1st Canadian Screen Awards	Laurence Anyways	Nathanaël Karmitz, Lyse Lafontaine	
2012; 1st Canadian Screen Awards	Midnight's Children	David Hamilton, Doug Mankoff, Steven Silver, Neil Tabatznik, Andrew Spaulding	
2012; 1st Canadian Screen Awards	Still Mine	Jody Colero, Avi Federgreen, Tamara Deverell	
2013; 2nd Canadian Screen Awards
2013; 2nd Canadian Screen Awards	Gabrielle	Kim McCraw, Luc Déry	
2013; 2nd Canadian Screen Awards	The Dismantling (Le Démantèlement)	Bernadette Payeur, Marc Daigle	
2013; 2nd Canadian Screen Awards	Empire of Dirt	Jennifer Podemski	
2013; 2nd Canadian Screen Awards	Enemy	Kim McCraw, Luc Déry, Miguel A. Faura, Niv Fichman, Sari Friedland	
2013; 2nd Canadian Screen Awards	The F Word	André Rouleau, David Gross, Macdara Kelleher	
2013; 2nd Canadian Screen Awards	The Grand Seduction	Roger Frappier, Barbara Doran	
2013; 2nd Canadian Screen Awards	Maïna	Karine Martin, Michel Poulette, Yves Fortin	
2013; 2nd Canadian Screen Awards	Tom at the Farm (Tom à la ferme)	Charles Gillibert, Nathanaël Karmitz, Xavier Dolan	
2014; 3rd Canadian Screen Awards
2014; 3rd Canadian Screen Awards	Mommy	Xavier Dolan, Nancy Grant	
2014; 3rd Canadian Screen Awards	Cast No Shadow	Chris Agoston, Christian Sparkes, Allison White	
2014; 3rd Canadian Screen Awards	Fall	Mehernaz Lentin	
2014; 3rd Canadian Screen Awards	In Her Place	Albert Shin, Igor Drljaca, Yoon Hyun Chan	
2014; 3rd Canadian Screen Awards	Maps to the Stars	Martin Katz, Michel Merkt, Saïd Ben Saïd	
2014; 3rd Canadian Screen Awards	You're Sleeping Nicole (Tu dors Nicole)	Luc Déry, Kim McCraw	
2015; 4th Canadian Screen Awards
2015; 4th Canadian Screen Awards	Room	Ed Guiney, David Gross	
2015; 4th Canadian Screen Awards	Brooklyn	Pierre Even, Marie-Claude Poulin, Finola Dwyer, Amanda Posey	
2015; 4th Canadian Screen Awards	Corbo	Félize Frappier	
2015; 4th Canadian Screen Awards	The Demons (Les Démons)	Philippe Lesage	
2015; 4th Canadian Screen Awards	Felix and Meira (Félix et Meira)	Sylvain Corbeil, Nancy Grant	
2015; 4th Canadian Screen Awards	The Forbidden Room	Phoebe Greenberg, Penny Mancuso, Phyllis Laing, David Christensen, Guy Maddin	
2015; 4th Canadian Screen Awards	My Internship in Canada (Guibord s'en va-t'en-guerre)	Luc Déry, Kim McCraw	
2015; 4th Canadian Screen Awards	Our Loved Ones (Les Êtres chers)	Sylvain Corbeil, Nancy Grant	
2015; 4th Canadian Screen Awards	Remember	Robert Lantos, Ari Lantos	
2015; 4th Canadian Screen Awards	Sleeping Giant	Karen Harnisch, Andrew Cividino, Marc Swenker, James Vandewater, Aaron Yeger	
2016; 5th Canadian Screen Awards
2016; 5th Canadian Screen Awards	It's Only the End of the World (Juste la fin du monde)	Nancy Grant, Sylvain Corbeil, Xavier Dolan	
2016; 5th Canadian Screen Awards	Bad Seeds (Les mauvaises herbes)	Luc Vandal, Lorraine Dufour	
2016; 5th Canadian Screen Awards	Before the Streets (Avant les rues)	Chloé Leriche	
2016; 5th Canadian Screen Awards	Hello Destroyer	Daniel Domachowski, Haydn Wazelle	
2016; 5th Canadian Screen Awards	Old Stone	Xianjian Wu, Chi-an Lin, Jing Wang, Sarah Stallard	
2016; 5th Canadian Screen Awards	Operation Avalanche	Matthew Miller, Lee Kim, Matt Johnson	
2016; 5th Canadian Screen Awards	Race	Louis-Philippe Rochon, Dominique Séguin, Jean-Charles Lévy, Luc Dayan	
2016; 5th Canadian Screen Awards	Searchers (Maliglutit)	Zacharias Kunuk	
2016; 5th Canadian Screen Awards	Those Who Make Revolution Halfway Only Dig Their Own Graves (Ceux qui font les révolutions à moitié n'ont fait que se creuser un tombeau)	Hany Ouichou	
2016; 5th Canadian Screen Awards	Weirdos	Marc Almon, Mike MacMillan, Bruce McDonald	
2017; 6th Canadian Screen Awards
2017; 6th Canadian Screen Awards	Maudie	Bob Cooper, Mary Young Leckie, Mary Sexton, Susan Mullen	
2017; 6th Canadian Screen Awards	Ava	Kiarash Anvari, Sadaf Foroughi	
2017; 6th Canadian Screen Awards	The Breadwinner	Andrew Rosen, Anthony Leo, Paul Young, Tomm Moore, Stéphan Roelants	
2017; 6th Canadian Screen Awards	It's the Heart That Dies Last (C'est le cœur qui meurt en dernier)	Richard Lalonde	
2017; 6th Canadian Screen Awards	The Little Girl Who Was Too Fond of Matches (La petite fille qui aimait trop les allumettes)	Marcel Giroux	
2017; 6th Canadian Screen Awards	Never Steady, Never Still	James Brown, Tyler Hagan	
2017; 6th Canadian Screen Awards	Ravenous (Les Affamés)	Stéphanie Morissette	
2018; 7th Canadian Screen Awards
2018; 7th Canadian Screen Awards	A Colony (Une colonie)	Fanny Drew, Sarah Mannering	
2018; 7th Canadian Screen Awards	Family First (Chien de garde)	Étienne Hansez	
2018; 7th Canadian Screen Awards	Genesis (Genèse)	Galilé Marion-Gauvin	
2018; 7th Canadian Screen Awards	The Great Darkened Days (La grande noirceur)	Sylvain Corbeil, Nancy Grant	
2018; 7th Canadian Screen Awards	Just a Breath Away (Dans la brume)	Christian Larouche, Guillaume Colboc, Nicolas Duval Adassovsky	
2019; 8th Canadian Screen Awards
2019; 8th Canadian Screen Awards	Antigone	Marc Daigle	
2019; 8th Canadian Screen Awards	Anne at 13,000 Ft.	Dan Montgomery, Kazik Radwanski	
2019; 8th Canadian Screen Awards	The Body Remembers When the World Broke Open	Tyler Hagan, Lori Lozinski	
2019; 8th Canadian Screen Awards	The Twentieth Century	Ménaïc Raoul, Gabrielle Tougas-Fréchette	
2019; 8th Canadian Screen Awards	White Lie	Karen Harnisch, Yonah Lewis, Calvin Thomas, Katie Bird Nolan, Lindsay Tapscott	

=== 2020s ===
Year	Film	Producers	Ref
2020; 9th Canadian Screen Awards
2020; 9th Canadian Screen Awards	Beans	Anne-Marie Gélinas	
2020; 9th Canadian Screen Awards	Funny Boy	David Hamilton, Hussain Amarshi	
2020; 9th Canadian Screen Awards	Nadia, Butterfly	Dominique Dussault	
2020; 9th Canadian Screen Awards	The Nest	Ed Guiney, Derrin Schlesinger, Rose Garnett, Sean Durkin	
2020; 9th Canadian Screen Awards	Underground (Souterrain)	Étienne Hansez	
2021; 10th Canadian Screen Awards
2021; 10th Canadian Screen Awards	Scarborough	Shasha Nakhai	
2021; 10th Canadian Screen Awards	Drunken Birds (Les oiseaux ivres)	Luc Déry, Kim McCraw	
2021; 10th Canadian Screen Awards	Night of the Kings (La Nuit des rois)	Yanick Létourneau	
2021; 10th Canadian Screen Awards	Night Raiders	Tara Woodbury, Paul Barkin, Ainsley Gardiner, Georgina Conder, Danis Goulet	
2021; 10th Canadian Screen Awards	Wildhood	Gharrett Patrick Paon, Julie Baldassi, Bretten Hannam	
2022; 11th Canadian Screen Awards
2022; 11th Canadian Screen Awards	Brother	Damon D'Oliveira, Sonya Di Rienzo, Aeschylus Poulos, Clement Virgo	
2022; 11th Canadian Screen Awards	Babysitter	Martin Paul-Hus, Fabrice Lambot, Catherine Léger, Pierre-Marcel Blanchot	
2022; 11th Canadian Screen Awards	Falcon Lake	Sylvain Corbeil, Nancy Grant	
2022; 11th Canadian Screen Awards	Riceboy Sleeps	Anthony Shim, Rebecca Steele, Bryan Demore	
2022; 11th Canadian Screen Awards	Summer with Hope	Christina Piovesan, Kiarash Anvari, Sadaf Foroughi	
2022; 11th Canadian Screen Awards	Viking	Luc Déry, Kim McCraw	
2023; 12th Canadian Screen Awards
2023; 12th Canadian Screen Awards	BlackBerry	Niv Fichman, Matthew Miller, Fraser Ash, Kevin Krikst	
2023; 12th Canadian Screen Awards	Humanist Vampire Seeking Consenting Suicidal Person (Vampire humaniste cherche suicidaire consentant)	Jeanne-Marie Poulain, Line Sander Egede	
2023; 12th Canadian Screen Awards	Infinity Pool	Karen Harnisch, Andrew Cividino, Christina Piovesan, Noah Segal, Rob Cotterill, Anita Juka, Daniel Kresmery, Jonathan Halperyn	
2023; 12th Canadian Screen Awards	Red Rooms (Les Chambres rouges)	Dominique Dussault	
2023; 12th Canadian Screen Awards	Richelieu	Geneviève Gosselin-G.	
2023; 12th Canadian Screen Awards	Solo	Étienne Hansez	
2024; 13th Canadian Screen Awards
2024; 13th Canadian Screen Awards	The Apprentice	Daniel Bekerman	
2024; 13th Canadian Screen Awards	Darkest Miriam	Brian Robertson, Julie Baldassi	
2024; 13th Canadian Screen Awards	Gamma Rays (Les Rayons gammma)	Henry Bernadet, Vuk Stojanovic, Jean-Martin Gagnon	
2024; 13th Canadian Screen Awards	Universal Language (Une langue universelle)	Sylvain Corbeil	
2024; 13th Canadian Screen Awards	Village Keeper	Enrique Miguel Baniqued, Karen Chapman	
2024; 13th Canadian Screen Awards	Who Do I Belong To	Annick Blanc, Maria Gracia Turgeon	
2025; 14th Canadian Screen Awards
2025; 14th Canadian Screen Awards	Nirvanna the Band the Show the Movie	Matthew Miller, Matt Greyson	
2025; 14th Canadian Screen Awards	40 Acres	Jennifer Holness	
2025; 14th Canadian Screen Awards	Blue Heron	Ryan Bobkin, Sara Wylie, Sophy Romvari	
2025; 14th Canadian Screen Awards	The Cost of Heaven (Gagne ton ciel)	Hany Ouichou	
2025; 14th Canadian Screen Awards	Follies (Folichonneries)	Laurie Pominville, Hany Ouichou, Éric K. Boulianne	
2025; 14th Canadian Screen Awards	Lovely Day (Mille secrets mille dangers)	Kim McCraw, Luc Déry	
2025; 14th Canadian Screen Awards	The Things You Kill	Alireza Khatami, Michael Solomon	
2025; 14th Canadian Screen Awards	Wrong Husband (Uiksaringitara)	Samuel Cohn-Cousineau, Jonathan Frantz	

== See also ==
- Prix Iris for Best Film
