= List of Canadian films of 1970 =

This is a list of Canadian films which were released in 1970:

Title	Director	Cast	Genre	Notes	Ref
The Act of the Heart	Paul Almond	Geneviève Bujold, Donald Sutherland, Monique Leyrac	Drama, romance		
The Awakening (L'amour humain)	Denis Héroux	Louise Marleau, Jacques Riberolles	Drama		
Crimes of the Future	David Cronenberg	Ronald Mlodzik	Horror, science fiction	Cronenberg's first medium-length feature.	
Don't Knock the Ox	Tony Ianzelo		Documentary		
Goin' Down the Road	Donald Shebib	Doug McGrath, Paul Bradley, Jayne Eastwood	Drama	Canadian Film Award – Feature Film, Actor (McGrath and Bradley); AV Preservation Trust Masterwork	
The Hart of London	Jack Chambers		Experimental		
Here and Now (L'Initiation)	Denis Héroux	Chantal Renaud, Danielle Ouimet, Jacques Riberolles, Céline Lomez	Exploitation		
Homer	John Trent	Don Scardino, Tisa Farrow, Alex Nicol	Drama		
The Johari Window	Collective		Docudrama	Created as a class project by Carleton University journalism students	
King of the Grizzlies	Ron Kelly	John Yesno, Chris Wiggins, Hugh Webster	Adventure		
The Last Act of Martin Weston	Michael Jacot	Jon Granik, Nuala Fitzgerald, Milena Dvorská, Al Waxman	Drama		
The Life and Times of Chester-Angus Ramsgood	David Curnick	Robert Mason, Mary-Beth McPhee, David Curnick, Ed Astley	Crime comedy		
A Little Fellow from Gambo	Julian Biggs	Joey Smallwood	Documentary		
Love in a Four Letter World	John Sone	Michael Kane, Helen Whyte, Candy Greene, Cayle Chernin, Monique Mercure	Pornography, sexploitation		
Prologue	Robin Spry	John Robb, Elaine Malus, Gary Rader, Peter Cullen	Drama		
Q-Bec My Love	Jean Pierre Lefebvre	Anne Lauriault	Satire		
Rainy Day Woman	Ron Hallis	Ashley Murray, Helen Keenan	Drama		
Red	Gilles Carle	Daniel Pilon, Geneviève Deloir, Gratien Gélinas, Fernande Giroux	Drama	Canadian Film Award – Supporting Actor (Gélinas), Supporting Actress (Giroux), Cinematography	
Sad Song of Yellow Skin	Michael Rubbo		NFB documentary	Canadian Film Award – Special Award; BAFTA – Robert Flaherty Documentary Award	
Surfacing on the Thames	David Rimmer		Experimental		
This Was the Time	Eugene Boyko	Robert Davidson	Documentary		
Two Women in Gold (Deux femmes en or)	Claude Fournier	Monique Mercure, Louise Turcot	Comedy		
Wild Africa	William Bantings, John Livingston		Documentary		

== See also ==
- 1970 in Canada
- 1970 in Canadian television
