= Carleton School of Journalism =

Department at Carleton University

Coordinates: 45.3824°N 75.6961°W

The School of Journalism and Communication is a department within the Faculty of Public Affairs at Carleton University in Ottawa, Ontario, Canada. It is the oldest four-year journalism program in Canada. The journalism program is recognized as one of North America's most well-respected centres for the study of journalism.

== Degrees and Programs ==
The School of Journalism and Communication is part of the Faculty of Public Affairs and has a distinct institutional status within the university, on account of its well-established history, higher admission requirements and distinct degree programs.

=== Undergraduate programs ===
The School of Journalism offers a four-year Bachelor of Journalism Honours program. Graduates of the undergraduate program receive an honours Bachelor of Journalism (BJ) degree.

In 2018, a Bachelor of Media Production and design degree was added to the program offerings.

=== Graduate Program ===
At the graduate level, the School of Journalism offers a two-year Master's program. Its graduates receive a Master of Journalism (MJ) degree. Applicants with professional journalism experience or degrees in journalism may be admitted directly into Year Two of the program, allowing them to complete the graduate program in one year.

==== Non-Degree Programs & Initiatives ====
===== Apprenticeships Program =====
The School of Journalism and Communication offers its students workplace experience through the Apprenticeship Program. Apprenticeships are unpaid work intended to provide hands-on experience to students outside of the classroom setting.

BJ students with third- and fourth-year standing have an apprenticeship/internship requirement and may use the Apprenticeship Program to meet this requirement.

MJ students must to complete four months of practical experience to their fulfill degree requirements and may use the Apprenticeships Program to meet program requirements.

===== Rwanda Initiative =====
From 2006 to 2011, the School of Journalism and Communication ran a teaching partnership and student internship exchange program called the Rwanda Initiative. The program sought to address the shortage of journalism educators in Rwanda and improve journalism standards through a teaching exchange between the Carleton University School of Journalism and Communication and the National University of Rwanda in Butare. The project involved curriculum development for the university programs and media-training workshops for working journalists in Rwanda presented by faculty from both universities.

The Initiative also included internship program for senior journalism students from Carleton. The journalism students would travel to Rwanda for two months, where they would intern at local media outlets. The Rwanda Initiative also facilitated travel for Rwandan journalists to study at Carleton or take up internships with Canadian news organizations.

The program was suspended in 2011 due to a lack of funding when a partnership agreement with the U.S. Government lapsed. The annual cost of the program was stated at $240,000 CAD.

===== The Future of Journalism Initiative =====
In 2020, the School of Journalism and Communication launched a research initiative called The Future of Journalism Initiative. The endeavor has designated funding, an emerging reporter bursary and a visiting research fellowship and works in service of "projects that serve a public interest and/or bolster the study of journalism in society."

== History ==
Founded in 1945, The School of Journalism and Communication celebrated its 75th anniversary in 2020. The first class was held on October 9, 1945 in downtown Ottawa.

Early classes at the school were taught by Henry Marshall Tory, who was also the president of the Carleton at the time. Tory is credited with personally spearheading the creation of the School of Journalism as a response to demands from returning World War II servicemen. The program began as an extension course and later became a four-year program.

The school granted the first degrees in journalism on October 23, 1946, all of which were conferred to women. They were also three of the first six degrees granted in the history of the University.

In 1970, a collective of students in the journalism program created the docudrama film The Johari Window.

== Alumni ==
The School of Journalism graduated approximately 5,000 alumni.

The school's notable alumni include Edward Greenspon, former editor-in-chief of The Globe and Mail, Paula Newton, International Affairs correspondent for the CNN, Nahlah Ayed, Middle East correspondent for the CBC, Rosemary Barton, chief political correspondent for the CBC, Arthur Kent, Emmy award–winning war correspondent, Dennis Gruending, former Member of Parliament, Paul Watson, Pulitzer Prize–winning photojournalist, Trina McQueen, founding president of the Discovery Channel, Claudia Mo, former Member of the Legislative Council of Hong Kong, Warren Kinsella, blogger, Toronto lawyer and political strategist for the Liberal Party of Canada and Peter Howell, movie critic for The Toronto Star.

Carleton University School of Journalism & Communication Graduates By Decade: 1940s
Name	Graduating Year	Degree	Publications & Work
Faith Avis	1945	BJ	First director of public relations at Kingston General Hospital, book reviewer for the Kingston Whig-Standard
Betty Cameron	1945	BJ	Ottawa Citizen reporter, BBC reporter
Wilfred H. Kesterton	1949	BJ	Scholar of Canadian journalism history and media law
Ellen Lennox	1945	BJ	Ottawa Citizen reporter

Carleton University School of Journalism & Communication Graduates By Decade: 1950s
Name	Graduating Year	Degree	Publications & Work
Carman Cumming	1955	BJ	Reporter at the United Nations and Parliament of Canada for the Canadian Press
Peter Worthington	1956	BJ	Founder of the Toronto Sun, Canadian News Hall of Fame inductee
Marguerite Hale	1954	BJ	Member of the Order of Canada

Carleton University School of Journalism & Communication Graduates By Decade: 1960s
Name	Graduating Year	Degree	Publications & Work
G. Stuart Adam	1963	BJ	Toronto Star reporter, Director of the School Journalism & Communication
David Eisenstadt	1967	BJ	PR professional
Joyce Fairbairn	1961	BJ	Communications coordinator for Pierre Trudeau, Senator
Eric Malling	1968	BJ	Regina Leader-Post and Toronto Star reporter, host of The Fifth Estate on the CBC, host of W5 on CTV
Trina McQueen	1964	BJ	Officer of the Order of Canada, Founding president of the Discovery Channel
Louise Rachlis	1968	BJ	Writer for Postmedia newspapers, advertising features editor at the Ottawa Citizen
Carol Lutes Racine	1962	BJ	Ottawa Citizen reporter, federal public servant
Gail Scott	1966	BJ	Host of W5 on CTV, host of Canada AM on CTV, commissioner of the CRTC
Linda Thom	1967	BJ	Olympic Gold Medallist, Member of the Order of Canada

Carleton University School of Journalism & Communication Graduates By Decade: 1970s
Name	Graduating Year	Degree	Publications & Work
Mark Bulgutch	1974	BJ	Senior Executive Producer at CBC News, Gemini Award winner
Michel Cormier	1979	BJ	Executive Director of News and Current Affairs at Société Radio-Canada
Edward Greenspon	1979	BJ	Editor-in-chief at The Globe and Mail
Arthur Kent	1975	BJ	War correspondent for NBC News, Emmy Award winner
Sheila MacVicar	1977	BJ	Foreign correspondent at CBC, ABC, CNN and CBS; Emmy Award, Edward R. Murrow Award and Peabody Award winner
Giselle Portenier	1978	BJ	Documentary filmmaker, Peabody Award winner
Michael Rose	1979	BJ	Author, journalist, broadcaster, communications consultant
Claudia Mo	1979	BJ	Journalist, former Member of the Legislative Council of Hong Kong, activist

Carleton University School of Journalism & Communication Graduates By Decade: 1980s
Name	Graduating Year	Degree	Publications & Work
Mike Blanchfield	1987, 2015	BJ ('87) MJ ('15)	War correspondent, reporter for the Ottawa Citizen, reporter for the Canadian Press
James Duthie	1989	BJ	Sportscaster with TSN, Olympic anchor with CTV
Joe Friday	1983	BJ	Public servant, Office of the Public Sector Integrity Commissioner
Paul Watson	1982	BJ	Photojournalist, Pulitzer Prize winner
Carl Hanlon	1981	BJ	Washington correspondent at Global Television, corporate communications for the World Bank
Greg Ip	1989	BJ	Economics journalist at The Vancouver Sun, The Economist, The Wall Street Journal
Jason Kay	1989	BJ	Editor in chief at The Hockey News
Warren Kinsella	1984	BJ	Lawyer, author, musician, political consultant, and commentator.
Laurie LeBlanc	1986	BJ	Deputy Minister at Ministry of Municipal Affairs and Housing for the Government of Ontario
Laura Lynch	1983	BJ	Host, foreign correspondent, parliamentary correspondent and senior reporter at CBC
Brian Maracle	1982	BJ	Writer at The Globe and Mail, host of Our Native Land on CBC, Mohawk language advocate and teacher
Susan Ormiston	1981	BJ	Senior correspondent at CBC News, Gemini Award winner, Foreign Press Association Award winner
Shelley Page	1986	BJ	Writer at the Ottawa Citizen, communications professional
André Picard	1987	BJ	Health reporter and columnist, the Globe and Mail
Miles Socha	1988	BJ	Editor in chief at Women's Wear Daily

Carleton University School of Journalism & Communication Graduates By Decade: 1990s
Name	Graduating Year	Degree	Publications & Work
Nahlah Ayed	1997	MJ	Foreign correspondent at CBC News
Kim Brunhuber	1995, 1997	BJ ('95) MJ ('97)	Foreign correspondent at CBC News, anchor of CNN Newsroom
Rita Celli	1991	BJ	Host of Ontario Today on CBC Radio
William Fox	1994	MJ	Ottawa bureau chief and Washington bureau chief for the Toronto Star, press secretary and director of communications for Prime Minister Brian Mulroney
Dennis Gruending	1996	MJ	Host at CBC Radio, Member of Parliament
Neil Herland	1997	BJ	Network news reader at CBC Radio, United Nations bureau chief for CBC/Radio-Canada
Alison Korn	1998	MJ	Olympic medallist, media relations advisor at the Senate of Canada
Andree Lau	1999	BJ	Editor in chief at HuffPost Canada
Sarah Lawley	1998	BJ	Assistant Deputy Minister for Consultations & Communications at the Department of Finance, World Health Organization board member for Canada
Mark MacKinnon	1997	BJ	Reporter at the Globe and Mail
Karen Mason		BJ	Reporter at CBC TV, non-profit co-founder
Paula Newton	1990	BJ	Correspondent at CNN, reporter at CTV News, Gemini Award winner
Nancy Payne		BJ, MJ	Producer at CBC Radio, editor at Kayak magazine
Nelofer Pazira	1997	BJ	Director, actress, journalist and author
Jacques Poitras	1990, 1991	BJ ('90), MJ ('91)	Writer at the Kingston Whig-Standard, New Brunswick Telegraph-Journal; reporter at CBC
Karyn Pugliese	1998	BJ	Parliamentary reporter for the Aboriginal Peoples Television Network, Gordon Sinclair Award winner, assistant professor at the Ryerson University School of Journalism
