= 1970 in Canada =

- Decades: 1950s; 1960s; 1970s; 1980s; 1990s
- See also: History of Canada; Timeline of Canadian history; List of years in Canada

Events from the 1970s of Canada.

== Incumbents ==
=== Crown ===
- Monarch – Elizabeth II

=== Federal government ===
- Governor General – Roland Michener
- Prime Minister – Pierre Trudeau
- Chief Justice – John Robert Cartwright (Ontario) (until 23 March) then Gérald Fauteux (Quebec)
- Parliament – 28th

=== Provincial governments ===
==== Lieutenant governors ====
- Lieutenant Governor of Alberta – Grant MacEwan
- Lieutenant Governor of British Columbia – John Robert Nicholson
- Lieutenant Governor of Manitoba – Richard Spink Bowles (until September 2) then William John McKeag
- Lieutenant Governor of New Brunswick – Wallace Samuel Bird
- Lieutenant Governor of Newfoundland – Ewart John Arlington Harnum
- Lieutenant Governor of Nova Scotia – Victor de Bedia Oland
- Lieutenant Governor of Ontario – William Ross Macdonald
- Lieutenant Governor of Prince Edward Island – John George MacKay
- Lieutenant Governor of Quebec – Hugues Lapointe
- Lieutenant Governor of Saskatchewan – Robert Hanbidge (until February 2) then Stephen Worobetz

==== Premiers ====
- Premier of Alberta – Harry Strom
- Premier of British Columbia – W.A.C. Bennett
- Premier of Manitoba – Edward Schreyer
- Premier of New Brunswick – Louis Robichaud (until November 12) then Richard Hatfield
- Premier of Newfoundland – Joey Smallwood
- Premier of Nova Scotia – G.I. Smith (until October 28) then Gerald Regan
- Premier of Ontario – John Robarts
- Premier of Prince Edward Island – Alexander B. Campbell
- Premier of Quebec – Jean-Jacques Bertrand (until May 12) then Robert Bourassa
- Premier of Saskatchewan – Ross Thatcher

=== Territorial governments ===
==== Commissioners ====
- Commissioner of Yukon – James Smith
- Commissioner of Northwest Territories – Stuart Milton Hodgson

== Events ==
=== January to June ===
- January 1 - The cities Fort William and Port Arthur are merged to create Thunder Bay, Ontario
- January 16 - The federal government announces plans to convert the nation to the metric system
- February 2 - Canada becomes an official observer at the Organization of American States
- February 5 - An oil tanker runs aground in Chedabucto Bay (Nova Scotia) causing a major oil spill
- February 17 - The use of phosphates in laundry detergent is banned
- March 2 - Keith Spicer is appointed as the first Official Languages Commissioner
- March 7 - A total solar eclipse affects the Maritimes
- March 20 - The Francophonie is established with Canada as a founding member
- April 27 - The Abortion Caravan leaves Vancouver
- May 1 - The Capitol Cinema, Ottawa's only movie palace, is closed and later demolished
- May 12 - Robert Bourassa becomes Premier of Quebec after his Liberals defeat the Union Nationale party
- May 22 - The Canadian Radio-television and Telecommunications Commission issues the first Canadian content rules for television and radio
- May 29 - The Hudson's Bay Company moves its headquarters from London to Winnipeg, Manitoba
- June 26 - The federal voting age is lowered from 21 to 18

=== July to December ===
- July 5 - 109 people are killed in the crash of an Air Canada DC-8.
- August 2 - Three Canadians are killed when a ferry collides with a Soviet freighter off British Columbia
- August 17 - Arthur Erickson is awarded at Expo '70 for his design of the Canadian pavilion
- August 20 - The Sudbury, Ontario tornado event, with winds up to 100 miles per hour, hits Sudbury and Field, Ontario. It was one of the worst tornadoes in Canadian history — killing six people, injuring 200, and causing C$17 million dollars in property damage.
- September 27 - TVOntario begins broadcasting
- October - Canada establishes formal relations with the People's Republic of China.
- October 5 - October Crisis: British Trade Commissioner James Cross is kidnapped by the FLQ.
- October 5 - Award-winning news & current affairs program, 24Hours starts on CBWT in Winnipeg.
- October 10 - October Crisis: Quebec Minister of Labour Pierre Laporte is kidnapped by FLQ.
- October 13 - Canada and the People's Republic of China establish diplomatic relations.
- October 16 - October Crisis: Pierre Trudeau introduces the War Measures Act to deal with the FLQ threat. Trudeau also addresses the nation in a televised speech explaining why he invoked the War Measures Act.
- October 17 - October Crisis: The body of Pierre Laporte is found in the trunk of a car.
- October 28 - Gerald Regan becomes Premier of Nova Scotia after his Liberals defeat George Smith's Conservatives in the 1970 election.
- November 6 - Police raid the hiding place of the FLQ's Chenier cell, arresting Bernard Lortie for the kidnapping and murder of Pierre Laporte.
- November 12 - Richard Hatfield becomes Premier of New Brunswick after his Conservatives defeat Louis Robichaud's Liberals in the 1970 election.
- December 3 - October Crisis: James Cross is released unharmed by FLQ
- December 28 - October Crisis: The FLQ kidnappers of Pierre Laporte are caught.

=== Full date unknown ===
- The Royal Commission on the Status of Women reports to Parliament
- INCO builds the world's tallest smokestack at Copper Cliff, Ontario
- The Pierre Laporte Bridge opens in Quebec City, at the time it is Canada's longest bridge
- The Don't Make a Wave Committee, the predecessor organization to Greenpeace, is founded in Vancouver
- The first ACTRA Awards are held
- Louis Cyr Monument

== Arts and literature ==
=== New books ===
- The Collected Works of Billy the Kid - Michael Ondaatje
- S th story I to: trew adventure - bill bissett
- Fifth Business - Robertson Davies
- The Journals of Susanna Moodie - Margaret Atwood
- Il est par là, le soleil - Roch Carrier
- The National Dream - Pierre Berton
- La Rivière sans repos - Gabrielle Roy
- Counterblast - Marshall McLuhan

=== New plays ===
- The Ecstasy of Rita Joe - George Ryga

=== Awards ===
- See 1970 Governor General's Awards for a complete list of winners and finalists for those awards.
- Stephen Leacock Award: Farley Mowat, The Boat Who Wouldn't Float
- Vicky Metcalf Award: Farley Mowat

=== Film ===
- Paul Almond's Act of the Heart opens

=== Music ===
- February 23 - The first Juno Awards for Canadian music are held.

== Sport ==
The Vancouver Canucks joined the National Hockey League on May 22

- February 16 - Police recover the Grey Cup after it was stolen the previous December.
- March 7 - Toronto Varsity Blues won their Fourth University Cup by defeating the Saint Mary's Huskies 3 to 2. The Final game was played in Charlottetown, Prince Edward Island
- April 5 - Bobby Orr becomes the first National Hockey League (NHL) defenceman to win the scoring title.
- May 2 - Montreal is awarded the 1976 Summer Olympics.
- May 10 - Parry Sound, Ontario's Bobby Orr is awarded the Conn Smythe Trophy
- May 12 - Ontario Hockey Association's Montreal Jr. Canadiens won their fourth and final Memorial Cup by defeating the Saskatchewan Junior Hockey League'sWeyburn Red Wings 4 games to 0. All games were played at the Montreal Forum
- May 22 - The National Hockey League adds a third Canadian team as the Vancouver Canucks are established.
- November 21 - Manitoba Bisons won their second consecutive Vanier Cup by defeating the Ottawa Gee-Gees 38–11 in the 6th Vanier Cup played at Varsity Stadium in Toronto
- November 28 - Montreal Alouettes won their Second Grey Cup by defeating the Calgary Stampeders 23–10 in the 58th Grey Cup played at Exhibition Stadium at Toronto.
- The first Arctic Winter Games commence in Yellowknife.

== Births ==
=== January to March ===
- January 6 - David Saint-Jacques, astronaut
- January 19 - Donald Haddow, swimmer
- January 24 - Lynn Coady, novelist and journalist
- February 18 - Raine Maida, singer and songwriter
- February 22 – Nicole Oliver, actress, voice actress, and singer
- February 23 - Marie-Josée Croze, actress
- March 5 - Paul Whelan, detainee in Russia
- March 18 - Ian Bird, field hockey player
- March 20 - Andrew Kishino, actor, voice actor, and rapper

=== April to June ===
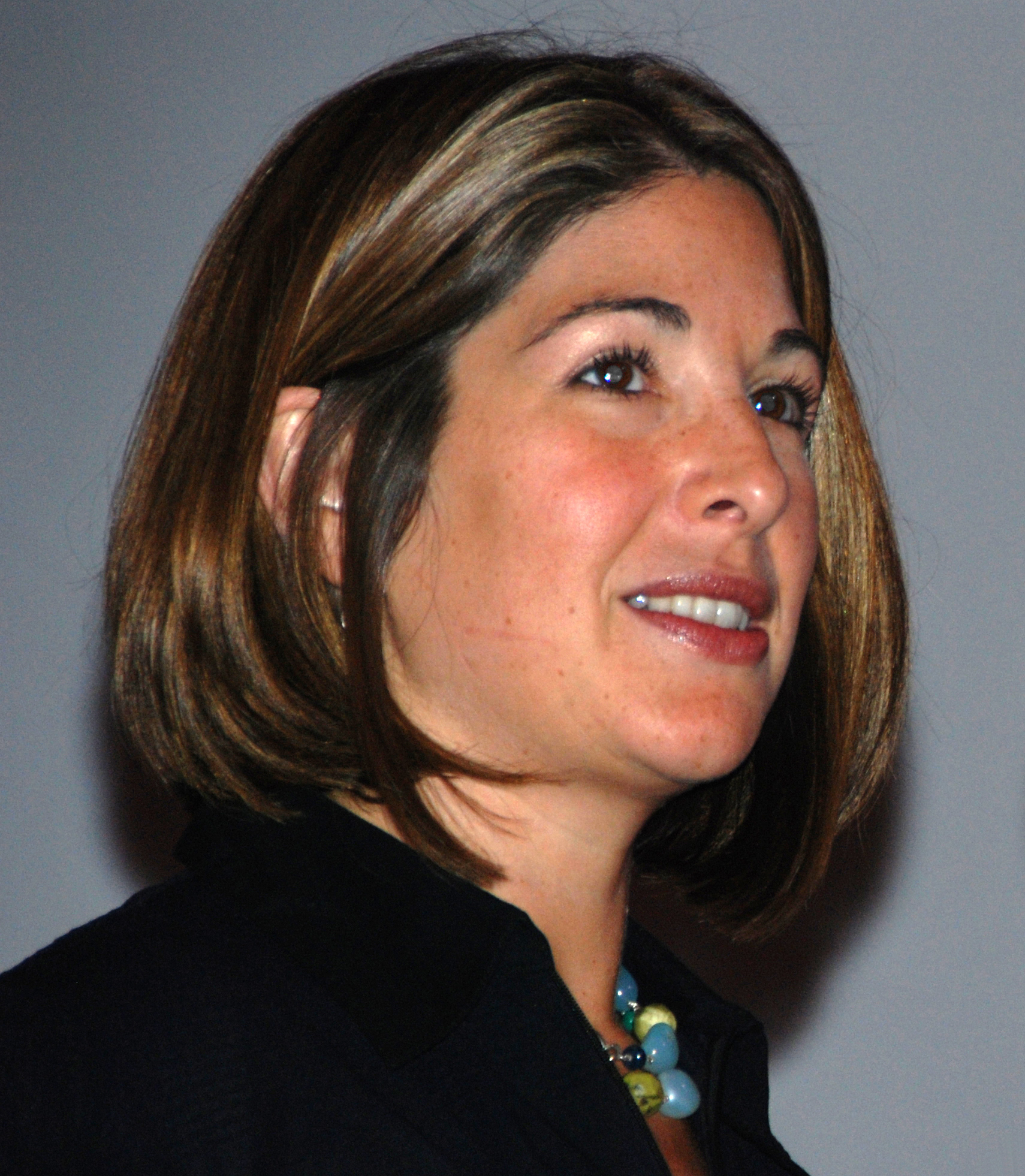
Naomi Klein

- April 4 - Barry Pepper, actor
- April 8 - J. R. Bourne, actor
- April 11 - Trevor Linden, ice hockey player
- May 3 - Marie-Soleil Tougas, Quebec actress and TV host (d. 1997)
- May 4
  - Will Arnett, actor
  - Karla Homolka, convicted murderer
- May 6 - Kavan Smith, actor
- May 8 - Naomi Klein, author and activist
- May 11 - Heather Stefanson, politician
- May 12 - Mike Weir, golfer
- May 19
  - Mario Dumont, politician
  - Jason Gray-Stanford, actor
- May 20 - Jason York, ice hockey player
- June 2
  - Ted Goveia, football executive (d. 2025)
  - Patricia Noall, swimmer and Olympic bronze medalist
- June 3 - Julie Masse, pop singer
- June 4 - Donald Farley, cross-country skier (d. 2016)
- June 12 - Gordon Michael Woolvett, actor
- June 23 - Kerri Buchberger, volleyball player

=== July to September ===
- July 14 - Michelle Sawatzky, volleyball player
- July 17 - Gavin McInnes, far right commentator
- July 28 - Isabelle Brasseur, pair skater
- July 31 - Amanda Stepto, actress
- August 6 - Michael Strange, boxer
- August 9 - Rod Brind'Amour, ice hockey player
- August 16
  - Tina Connelly, track and field athlete
  - Dean Del Mastro, politician
  - Daren Millard, sportscaster
- August 19 - James Rajotte, politician
- August 31 - Zack Ward, actor

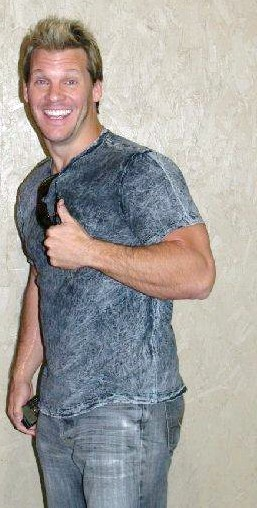
Chris Jericho

- September 1 - Mitsou, pop singer, businesswoman, television and radio host and actress
- September 7
  - Keltie Duggan, swimmer
  - Gino Odjick, ice hockey player (d. 2023)
- September 19 - Kathryn Humphreys, CityNews sports anchor
- September 24 - Isabelle Turcotte Baird, triathlete

=== October to December ===
- October 5 - Tina Poitras, race walker
- October 8 - Heather Jones, field hockey player
- November 9 - Chris Jericho, wrestler, actor, author, radio and television host and rock musician
- November 10 - Sue Reid, field hockey player
- November 12 - Sarah Harmer, singer-songwriter and activist
- November 15 - Jeff Adams, wheelchair athlete, multiple Paralympic medalist and World Champion
- December 15 - Michael Shanks, actor
- December 18 - Victoria Pratt, actress and model
- December 19 - Jonathan Cleveland, swimmer and Olympic bronze medalist
- December 20 - Nicole de Boer, actress
- December 22 - Ted Cruz, politician, and U.S. Senator from Texas since 2013
- December 23 - Catriona Le May Doan, speed skater, double Olympic gold medalist and World Champion
- December 25 - Stu Barnes, ice hockey player and coach

=== Full date unknown ===
- Maher Arar, engineer and rendition victim

== Deaths ==
- January 23 - Nell Shipman, actress, screenwriter, producer, and animal trainer (b.1892)
- January 29 - Lawren Harris, Group of Seven painter (b.1885)
- February 21 - Louis-René Beaudoin, politician and Speaker of the House of Commons of Canada (b.1912)
- February 27 - Marie Dionne, one of the Dionne quintuplets (b.1934)
- March 11 - William Stewart Wallace, historian
- April 6 - Émile Coderre, French-Canadian poet
- May 9 - Andrew Watson Myles, politician (b.1884)
- May 31 - Terry Sawchuk, ice hockey player (b.1929)
- June 12 - John Keiller MacKay, soldier, jurist and 19th Lieutenant Governor of Ontario (b.1888)
- June 22 - William Melville Martin, politician and Premier of Saskatchewan (b.1876)
- October 17 - Pierre Laporte, Quebec politician and Minister, kidnapped and murdered by Front de libération du Québec (FLQ) (b.1921)
- September 12 - Jacob Viner, economist (b.1892)

== See also ==
- 1970 in Canadian television
- List of Canadian films of 1970
