= Larry Crosley =

American-Canadian composer

Lawrence Crosley
- Born: May 19, 1932; Oaklandon, Indiana, U.S.
- Died: January 24, 1998
- Occupations: Composer; musician; educator
- Known for: Two-time Canadian Film Award winner; composer for over 200 films and TV programs
- Spouse: Michal Anne Crawley (m. 1965)

Lawrence Crosley (May 19, 1932 - January 24, 1998) was an American-Canadian composer. He was most noted as a two-time Canadian Film Award winner for his film scores, winning at the 23rd Canadian Film Awards in 1971 for Seasons in the Mind and at the 24th Canadian Film Awards in 1972 for Journey to Power.

A native of Oaklandon, Indiana, he was educated at the Eastman School of Music before moving to Ottawa, Ontario, as a staff composer for Crawley Films; in 1965 he married Michal Anne Crawley, the daughter of Crawley Films principals F. R. Crawley and Judith Crawley. He also later worked for the National Film Board of Canada, the Canadian Broadcasting Corporation and other companies, composing music for over 200 films and television shows over the course of his career.

He also composed jazz and chamber music pieces, played jazz clarinet, and taught music as a sessional instructor at Northern Arizona University and the University of Ottawa.

In addition to his Canadian Film Award wins he won the Bijou Award for Best Musical Score in 1981 for The Lost Pharaoh, and received a Gemini Award nomination for Best Original Music Score for a Program or Mini-Series at the 5th Gemini Awards in 1990 for The Teddy Bears' Picnic.

== Filmography ==
- St. Lawrence North - 1970
- Amanita Pestilens - 1963
- The Johari Window - 1970
- The Man Who Skied Down Everest - 1970
- The Tenth Decade - 1971
- Cry of the Wild - 1972
- Whistling Smith - 1975
- I'll Find a Way - 1977
- The Way It Is - 1985
- Aces: A Story of the First Air War - 1993
