= The Last Butterfly =

1991 Czech drama film

- Directed by: Karel Kachyňa
- Written by: Ota Hofman; Karel Kachyňa
- Based on: The Last Butterfly by Michael Jacot
- Produced by: Caroline Schweich; Boudjemaa Dahmane; Jacques Méthé
- Starring: Tom Courtenay; Brigitte Fossey; Ingrid Held
- Cinematography: Jiří Krejčík jr.
- Edited by: Jiří Brožek; Suzanne Lang-Willar
- Music by: Milan Svoboda; Alex North
- Production companies: Barrandov Studios; Cinema et Communication; Filmexport Praha; HTV International Ltd.
- Distributed by: Lucernafilm
- Release date: January 1, 1991
- Running time: 111 minutes
- Countries: Czechoslovakia; France
- Languages: Czech; English

The Last Butterfly (Czech: Poslední motýl; French: La dernier papillon) is a 1990 Czech–French holocaust drama film directed by Karel Kachyňa based on the book The Last Butterfly by Canadian author Michael Jacot.

== Cast ==
- Tom Courtenay as Antoine Moreau
- Brigitte Fossey as Věra
- Ingrid Held as Michèle
- Freddie Jones as Conductor Karl Rheinberg
- Milan Kňažko as Commandant Gruber
- Josef Kemr as Leo Stadler
- Drahomíra Fialková as Leo Stadler's wife
- Pavel Bobek as Silberstein
- Josef Laufer as Petersen
- Hana Hegerová as Singer
- Linda Jablonská as Stella

== Release ==
The movie had a premiere in Czechoslovakia in 1991 and on ITV in the United Kingdom on 11 May 1992. The film received generally positive reviews. Stephen Holden wrote in The New York Times: "The mood of calm despair that hangs over the film lends it a disquietingly surreal aura. But it also plays into the story, which describes an attempt to deliver a horrifying message without stating it in words." David Mills wrote in The Washington Post: "The Last Butterfly demonstrates the precious power of art to transmit emotional truths about history, if not the factual completeness of history."

== See also ==
- Theresienstadt Ghetto and the Red Cross
- Theresienstadt (1944 film)

== Bibliography ==
- Brownstein, Rich (2021). Holocaust Cinema Complete: A History and Analysis of 400 Films, with a Teaching Guide. Jefferson, North Carolina: McFarland & Company, Inc. ISBN 9781476641928. OCLC 1269508907.
