= Selling Out (film) =

1972 film

- Directed by: Tadeusz Jaworski
- Written by: Jack Winter; Tadeusz Jaworski
- Produced by: Tadeusz Jaworski
- Starring: Vernon Macgoughan, Bob Hogg, Frank McNutt, Pamela Winter
- Narrated by: Jon Granik
- Cinematography: Bruce Allen; Stanley Lipinski
- Edited by: Martin Pepler
- Music by: Peter Cornell
- Production company: Unit Productions
- Distributed by: Humber College
- Release date: 1972
- Running time: 32 minutes
- Country: Canada
- Language: English

Selling Out is a 1972 Canadian short film for cinema and TV produced and directed by Tadeusz Jaworski, and written by Jaworski and Jack Winter.

At the 45th Academy Awards in 1973, it was nominated for an Academy Award (Short Subject), and was named Best Documentary at the 24th Canadian Film Awards.

The film was sponsored by the Humber College of Applied Arts and Technology and is about a Prince Edward Island farmer who, because his children have moved away, must sell the farm that has been in his family for generations. It raises the question of whether government should prevent the sale of Canadian farms to non-Canadians.
