= Lawrence Township, Marion County, Indiana =

Lawrence Township Marion County
- Township
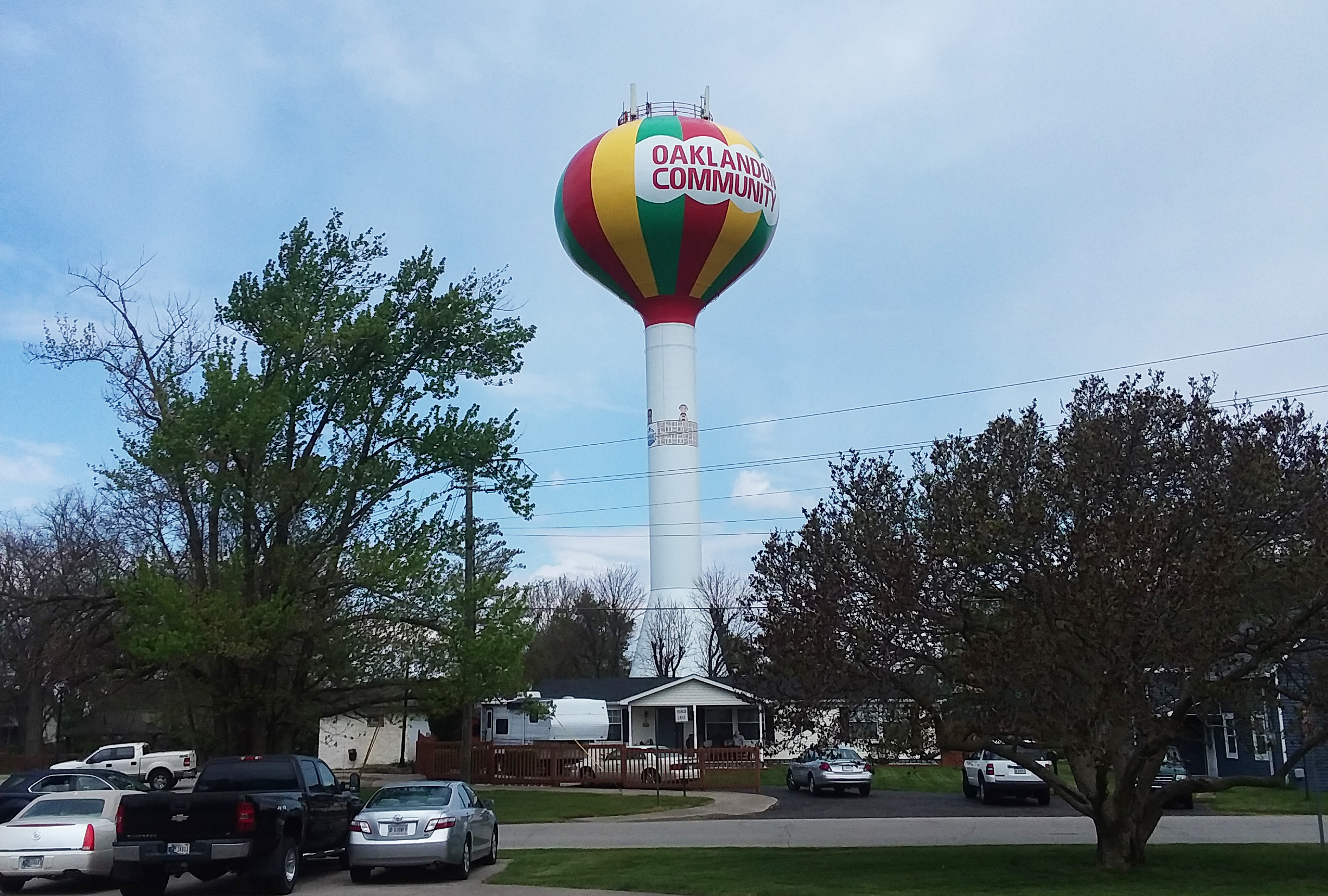
- Water tower in Oaklandon

- Coordinates: 39°52′48″N 86°00′37″W
- Country: United States
- State: Indiana
- County: Marion
- Created: 1822

Government
  - Type: Indiana township

Area
  - Total: 48.51 sq mi (125.6 km^{2})
  - Land: 46.92 sq mi (121.5 km^{2})
  - Water: 1.59 sq mi (4.1 km^{2})
- Elevation: 751 ft (229 m)

Population (2020)
  - Total: 122,321
  - Density: 2,524.4/sq mi (974.7/km^{2})
- Time zone: UTC-5 (Eastern)
  - Summer (DST): UTC-4 (Eastern)
- ZIP: 46235; 46236
- FIPS code: 18-42444
- GNIS feature ID: 453545

Lawrence Township is one of nine townships in Marion County, Indiana, United States. The population was 122,321 at the 2020 census, up from 118,447 at the 2010 United States census. Lawrence Township was organized in 1822.

The Metropolitan School District of Lawrence Township provides services to students in portions of Lawrence Township and the city of Lawrence.

Historical population
Census	Pop.	Note	%±
1890	2,367		—
1900	2,372		0.2%
1910	3,295		38.9%
1920	3,127		−5.1%
1930	5,747		83.8%
1940	7,183		25.0%
1950	8,577		19.4%
1960	34,405		301.1%
1970	66,296		92.7%
1980	75,860		14.4%
1990	94,548		24.6%
2000	111,961		18.4%
2010	118,447		5.8%
2020	122,321		3.3%
Source: US Decennial Census

== Oaklandon ==
The Oaklandon Historic District is located in the northeast corner of Lawrence Township in northeastern Marion County, and encompasses a portion of the mid-19th century settlement known as Oaklandon. Located approximately 14 miles (22.4 km) northeast of downtown Indianapolis, the Oaklandon area is currently a part of the city of Lawrence, which after a six-year court battle annexed it, Indian Lake, and other unincorporated parts of Lawrence Township in 1976.

When Oaklandon was established in 1849 along the route of the Indianapolis and Bellefontaine Railroad, it was surrounded by farms and vacant land; now it is enveloped by the urban sprawl of Indianapolis and Lawrence. Late 20th century housing developments, many of them planned using winding streets or cul de sacs, have now surrounded the early community.

Just north of the district is the railroad right-of-way established in the late 1840s, and currently used by CSX Transportation. To the south is Pendleton Pike, at one time a toll road that passed directly through Oaklandon, running north along present−day Oaklandon Road, and then west along present−day Broadway Street. Pendleton Pike was rerouted in the early 20th century to pass along the southern edge of the community, and is now a busy six−lane thoroughfare lined with commercial development. The area of the early community is marked by small and medium−size residences and outbuildings dating from the late 19th and early 20th centuries, along with two church buildings from the same era.

Oaklandon never incorporated, and therefore had no official town limits, but appears never to have developed south of present-day Pendleton Pike. Until its demolition in the early 1940s, the community's two−story brick schoolhouse stood at the northwest corner of Oaklandon Road and Pendleton Pike and would have alerted travelers of the community to the north. Today a retail development occupies the school's site, but that development's sign includes a panel reading “Oaklandon Community established 1849.” Upon passing that sign and heading into the historic district, one immediately notices that the area differs from the surrounding commercial and residential area. The feeling of a small town is engendered by the relative narrowness of the streets and the older housing stock. That atmosphere is reinforced by the small lots and modest setbacks that characterize the housing stock on Oaklandon Road, the older part of the district. This section of Oaklandon Road (from Pendleton Pike north to Broadway) is also the only street in the area with streetlights, curbs, and sidewalks; the latter were installed for the community's children who walked along Oaklandon Road to school.

== Geography ==
=== Municipalities ===
- Indianapolis (partial)
- Lawrence

=== Communities ===
- Castleton (mostly)
- Geist
- I-69 / Fall Creek
- Oaklandon
