= John and the Missus =

- Directed by: Gordon Pinsent
- Written by: Gordon Pinsent (writer and short)
- Produced by: John Hunter; Peter O'Brian; Gabriella Martinelli; S. Howard Rosen
- Starring: Gordon Pinsent; Jackie Burroughs
- Cinematography: Frank Tidy
- Edited by: Bruce Nyznik
- Music by: Michael Conway Baker
- Distributed by: Cinema Group
- Release dates: December 10, 1986 (Canada); October 23, 1987 (U.S.)
- Running time: 100 minutes
- Country: Canada
- Language: English

John and the Missus is a 1986 Canadian drama film. The film was directed by and starred Gordon Pinsent who wrote the screenplay from his 1974 novel of the same name.

== Plot ==
John Munn (Pinsent) is a miner from a small Newfoundland town who gets laid off when the mine closes. Rather than leave the town for work, as everyone else has done, John sets out to save the town along with his wife The Missus (Burroughs).

== Recognition ==
- 1987
  - Genie Award for Best Music Score - Michael Conway Baker - Won
  - Genie Award for Best Performance by an Actor in a Leading Role - Gordon Pinsent - Won
  - Genie Award for Best Motion Picture - John Hunter
    Peter O'Brian - Nominated
  - Genie Award for Best Performance by an Actor in a Supporting Role - Roland Hewgill - Nominated
  - Genie Award for Best Performance by an Actress in a Leading Role - Jackie Burroughs - Nominated
  - Genie Award for Best Adapted Screenplay - Gordon Pinsent - Nominated
