= 1970 in Canadian television =

The following is a list of events affecting Canadian television in 1970. Events listed include television show debuts, finales, cancellations, and channel launches.

== Events ==
| Date | Event |
|---|---|
| September 27 | OECA goes on the air. |
| October 3 | The 1970 Canadian Film Awards. |
| October 5 | Coverage of the October Crisis begins airing on all the main networks. |

=== Debuts ===
| Show | Station | Premiere Date |
|---|---|---|
| Here Come the Seventies | CTV | September 20 |
| The Trouble with Tracy | CTV | September 20 |
| The Hart and Lorne Terrific Hour | CBC Television | September 20 |
| Adventures in Rainbow Country | CBC Television | September 20 |
| This Land | CBC Television | September 23 |
| Drop-In | CBC Television | September 28 |
| Zut! | CBC Television | October 17 |

=== Ending this year ===
| Show | Station | Cancelled |
|---|---|---|
| People in Conflict | CTV | September 11 |
| Strange Paradise | CBC Television | Unknown |

== Television shows ==
=== 1950s ===
- Country Canada (1954–2007)
- CBC News Magazine (1952–1981)
- Chez Hélène (1959–1973)
- Circle 8 Ranch (1955–1978)
- The Friendly Giant (1958–1985)
- Hockey Night in Canada (1952–present)
- The National (1954–present)
- Front Page Challenge (1957–1995)
- Wayne and Shuster Show (1958–1989)

=== 1960s ===
- Audubon Wildlife Theatre (1968–1974)
- CTV National News (1961–present)
- Elwood Glover's Luncheon Date (1963–1975)
- The Galloping Gourmet (1968–1972)
- Land and Sea (1964–present)
- Man Alive (1967–2000)
- Mr. Dressup (1967–1996)
- Music Hop (1962–1972)
- The Nature of Things (1960–present, scientific documentary series)
- The Pierre Berton Show (1962–1973)
- The Pig and Whistle (1967–1977)
- Question Period (1967–present, news program)
- Reach for the Top (1961–1985)
- Singalong Jubilee (1961–1974)
- Take 30 (1962–1983)
- Telescope (1963–1973)
- The Tommy Hunter Show (1965–1992)
- University of the Air (1966–1983)
- W-FIVE (1966–present, newsmagazine program)

== TV movies ==
Countdown Canada (CBC; Rob Fothergill)

== Television stations ==
=== Debuts ===
| Date | Market | Station | Channel | Affiliation | Notes/References |
|---|---|---|---|---|---|
| March 1 | Edmonton, Alberta | CBXFT | 11 | Radio-Canada (O&O) | |
| September 27 | Toronto, Ontario | CICA-TV | 19 | TVOntario | |
| Unknown | Montreal, Quebec | VOX | 9 (cable-only) | Independent | This cable channel, now known as MATV, is a community channel serving the province of Quebec. |
| Unknown | Varied locations | Eastlink TV | (cable-only) | Independent | Cable channel serving the Maritime Provinces and portions of northern Ontario |

== See also ==
- 1970 in Canada
- List of Canadian films
