= The Trap (1966 film) =

1966 UK-Canadian film by Sidney Hayers

- Film poster by Arnaldo Putzu
- Directed by: Sidney Hayers
- Screenplay by: David D. Osborn
- Story by: David D. Osborn
- Produced by: George H. Brown
- Starring: Rita Tushingham; Oliver Reed
- Cinematography: Robert Krasker
- Edited by: Tristam Cones
- Music by: Ron Goodwin
- Color process: Eastmancolor
- Production company: George H. Brown Productions
- Distributed by: Rank Film Distributors
- Release date: 15 September 1966
- Running time: 106 minutes
- Countries: United Kingdom; Canada
- Language: English
- Budget: US$1,250,000 or $1.5 million

The Trap is a 1966 British-Canadian western adventure film directed by Sidney Hayers and starring Oliver Reed and Rita Tushingham. Shot in the wilderness of the Canadian province of British Columbia, the film is an unusual love story about a rough trapper and a mute orphan girl.

== Plot ==
French-Canadian fur trapper Jean La Bête paddles his canoe through wild water towards the settlement to sell furs. At the settlement, a steamboat is landing and the Trader and his mute foster-child Eve arrive at the seaport to fetch mail and consumer goods. The trader explains to Eve that the ship brings "Jailbirds ... from the east" and that "their husbands-to-be had bailed them out and paid their fines and their passages with a guarantee of marriage". Later, the captain is auctioning a woman because her husband-to-be has died in the meantime. Jean La Bête decides to take his chance to buy her but makes his bid too late.

Native Americans Yellow Dog and No Name have told the Trader that La Bête is dead. The Trader, heavily in debt, has spent money he owes La Bête so that when La Bête calls to collect his dues, the trader has to use his own savings. Next day, the trader's wife, to compensate for the loss of her savings, offers Eve for a thousand dollars to the simple-minded, rough-cut trapper. She explains that Eve's inability to speak is caused from the shock she suffered when she had to witness how her parents were murdered years before.

La Bête agrees to buy Eve and takes her against her will into the wilderness of British Columbia. Eve rejects La Bête's advances. La Bête takes her hunting and acquaints her with the wilderness but here, as well, he fails to win her trust. Eve defends herself from his advances with a knife.

One day, on checking his traps for caught animals, La Bête is threatened by a cougar. He shoots the cat but gets his foot into his own bear trap. Badly injured, he tries to drag himself back to his hut, hunted by wolves. Eve is waiting at the cabin and hears the howling of the wolves approaching the hut. She takes a gun and sets out in search for La Bête; together they get rid of the wolf pack. La Bête's lower left leg is broken, so he asks Eve to bring the medicine man from the next Indian village, a two days trip away. The winter has come, so Eve starts an arduous walk over snow-covered hilltops. She eventually reaches the village only to find it deserted.

Returning empty-handed, Eve finds La Bête already suffering from blood poisoning. He urges Eve to cut off his poisoned leg with an axe. After La Bête has tried to stun himself by gulping rum, Eve complies, and he passes out from pain. Eve nurses the trapper, is forced to learn to hunt on her own and becomes capable of providing for the couple. Eventually, after La Bête learns to say 'please' to her, thanks her for saving his life and declares that he could not live without her, they have sex.

The morning after, Eve seems to regret her decision and leaves the cabin, holding a rifle against La Bête who follows her to the river, angry and perplexed. Eve flees in his canoe. Her journey is fraught and she is thrown from the canoe in white-water rapids. The empty canoe is found by native Americans and Eve is rescued, and taken back to the settlement where she was taken from. Although welcome, she remains an outsider. She remains in bed for two months and loses the child she was carrying. Her family arranges a marriage for Eve to a man who previously flirted with her. Eve does not appear happy, however.

On the day of marriage, her foster-sister and foster mother dress her whilst the foster-sister demands to know how she lived in the wild, and if she killed La Bête. Eve runs away again to return to Jean La Bête. She arrives on the river beach, and La Bête welcomes her home by telling her to clean the house. Eve smiles. She later watches La Bête hobbling into the forest while singing. Eve chops wood and carries it into the cabin.

== Cast ==
- Rita Tushingham as Eve
- Oliver Reed as La Bete
- Rex Sevenoaks as The Trader
- Barbara Chilcott as trader's wife
- Linda Goranson as trader's daughter
- Blaine Fairman as clerk
- Walter Marsh as preacher
- Joseph Golland as Baptiste (as Jo Golland)
- Jon Granik as No Name
- Merv Campone as Yellow Dog
- Reg McReynolds as Captain (as Reginald McReynolds)

== Production ==
The film was based on an original script by David Osborn an ex-trapper.

Half the finance came from Rank half from Canada.

Filming started 11 October 1965 in Panorama Studios in West Vancouver. It resumed in 1966 in Scotland.

It was also known as Deep is the Forrest.

The soundtrack was composed by Ron Goodwin and the main theme ("Main Titles to The Trap") is used as the theme tune for the BBC's live coverage of the London Marathon, performed by the Bournemouth Symphony Orchestra.

== Release ==
The film opened at the Odeon in Kensington, London on 15 September 1966 paired with The Pad (and How to Use It) (1966). It had its official world premiere later in the evening at the Leicester Square Theatre.

== Critical reception ==
The Monthly Film Bulletin wrote: "Primitive saga of the pioneering backwoods, a simple story simply told. And this is where the film falls: simple folk the Canadian settlers may have been, but the script makes them crude to boot. Oliver Reed and Rita Tushingham (not required to speak) struggle to make their characters more than cardboard cut-outs, and some of their scenes together in the log cabin have a certain charm, but for the most part the script requires them to do little more than register an appropriate expression. Still, there is compensation in Robert Krasker's fine location photography (marred only by studio snow and some very obvious process shots) and in an excellently staged action sequence when the trapper is hunted by a pack of snarling wolves."

Filmink called it "an attempt by Rank to repeat the success of The Savage Innocents – it’s another savage-man-melted-by-love story... The movie looks gorgeous, has two charismatic stars, and was well directed by Sidney Hayers, perhaps the most under-rated British director of the 1960s. It has flaws, particularly the dubbing of Reed’s voice (why did they do this?)."

Leslie Halliwell said: "Primitive open air melodrama with good action sequences; well made but hardly endearing."

The Radio Times Guide to Films gave the film 4/5 stars, writing: "Made at the height of the Swinging Sixties, this surprisingly moving drama was a distinct change of pace for stars Oliver Reed and Rita Tushingham. Set in Canada in the 1880s, it traces the relationship of fur trapper Reed and the waif-like Tushingham, a mute he purchases at a wife auction. Acting almost solely with her enormous eyes, Tushingham gives a genuinely affecting performance and, as impatience turns to understanding and ultimately affection, Reed also demonstrates a mellow side that he too rarely allows us to see. Director Sidney Hayers makes their adventures believable."
