= Aces: A Story of the First Air War =

- VHS cover
- Directed by: Raoul Fox
- Written by: George Pearson
- Produced by: George Pearson
- Narrated by: Bill McNeil; George Pearson
- Cinematography: Savas Kalogeras
- Edited by: Raoul Fox
- Music by: Larry Crosley
- Production company: National Film Board of Canada
- Distributed by: National Film Board of Canada
- Release date: 1993
- Running time: 93 minutes
- Country: Canada
- Language: English

Aces: A Story of the First Air War (Les As du ciel - Chronique de la première guerre des airs for a French-language version) is a 92-minute 1993 Canadian historical drama film directed by Raoul Fox and produced by the National Film Board of Canada (NFB). The film chronicles the career of a fictional Canadian aviator during the First World War. From his commissioning in 1914, he becomes an observer and then wins his wings as a fighter pilot, and by 1918, is involved in the deadly air combat over the front lines.

== Plot ==
Recalling the stories of his late grandfather, a young man deliberates over the sale of a homebuilt replica of a S.E.5 fighter aircraft they had built together. His grandfather's voice comes back to him, relating his experiences, beginning with his enlistment in 1914 as a soldier in Canada. After a time in the trenches on the Western Front as an officer in the infantry, he applies to become an aviator and is assigned to a balloon corps as an air observer.

Spotting for gunners is his first task, but the job is dangerous, as balloons draw the attention of anti-aircraft batteries (called "archie") and enemy aircraft. A parachute saves him when his balloon is shot down. His second transfer request to an aircraft squadron is quickly approved, mainly because there is a pressing need for replacements during the "Fokker Scourge" in 1915–1916, when Allied flyers were being shot down in large numbers by superior German Fokker aircraft.

Flying aerial reconnaissance missions in a B.E.2C reconnaissance/bomber aircraft is just as harrowing. Although the air observers are armed and able to fight back, the crews call themselves "Fokker fodder". With the development of more capable Allied fighters, air superiority is slowly won back. On the ground, armies are no longer able to move without being observed from the air, leading to a blood-stained stalemate.

In the air, German ascendency in fighters reasserts itself, leading to "Bloody April", 1917. Until new Allied designs appear, the skies over the Western Front are ruled by German aces such as Baron Manfred von Richthofen, the "Red Baron". (Note: An "ace" scored five aerial victories over his opponents.) After being wounded, a final application to become a pilot is approved. The air war is still considered the realm of "knights of the air" by not only Canadians but also Americans signing up, even before their country enters the war. At the completion of his training in 1918, despite his background as an air observer, grandfather is a neophyte assigned to a fighter squadron at the front. Flying the new S.E.5, he takes part in air combat against seasoned German aces.

With his prospects grim, he beats "the odds" when the Armistice ends the conflict. The Canadian contribution to the air war has been remarkable: 10,000 aviators, including "Billy" Bishop and Raymond Collishaw, among the top aces in the war.

His grandson resolves to keep the replica S.E.5 as a tribute to his grandfather and all the others who fought in the first air war.

== Production ==
Technological advances during the First World War involved photography and wireless communications.

Aces: A Story of the First Air War is more of a docudrama than a traditional documentary, weaving a fictional story into a depiction of the air war on the Western Front. Canadian military aviation historians Philip Markham (technical coordinator and historical consultant) and Brereton Greenhous (historical consultant) provided historical context to the fictional account of a Canadian aviator. Group Captain (RCAF Ret'd) A.J. Bauer was the film's overall technical consultant.

The film utilized rarely seen archival footage from the National Archives of Canada, the Imperial War Museum, the Audiovisual Archives (The Hague) and the Fokker Aircraft Corporation (Amsterdam). Some aerial scenes were from the film Wings (1927). Footage was also shot of modern First World War replicas flown by owner-pilot Cole Palen at the Old Rhinebeck Aerodrome, in Red Hook, New York.

== Reception ==
Aces: A Story of the First Air War was primarily made-for-television and after broadcast on a number of different Canadian networks in 1993 was released to the home market on June 4, 1997. The film was made available as a VHS video to schools, libraries, film libraries operated by university and provincial authorities and other interested parties.

Reviews were generally favourable, with the Video Rating Guide for Libraries noting: "High school students to adults will find [Aces] offers an excellent use of documentary technique to capture the mood of World War I. The video's recollection of World War I brings a vivid contrast to current military air technology." Alex Leites, in a review for the History Journal, called the film "... this hidden gem." Library Journal stated "The film's producers have done a superb job of applying modern standards to rare archival footage."

The New York Times reviewer said, "This video combines rare film footage with interviews to re-create aspects of the real-life battles confronted by ~~America's~~<sic> World War I flying aces."

== Awards ==
Aces: A Story of the First Air War received a number of awards:

- People's Choice Award at the International Aviation Film/Video Festival, August 3–6, 1995, Red Deer, Alberta, Canada.
- Silver CINDY Award (Itinerant) at the International CINDY Competition, May 1, 1995, Spring Valley, California, United States.
- Bronze Plaque Award (Category: Social Issues) at the International Film and Video Festival, October 25–28, 1994, Columbus, Ohio United States.
