= Oaklandon Historic District =

Historic district in Indiana, United States

- U.S. National Register of Historic Places
- U.S. Historic district
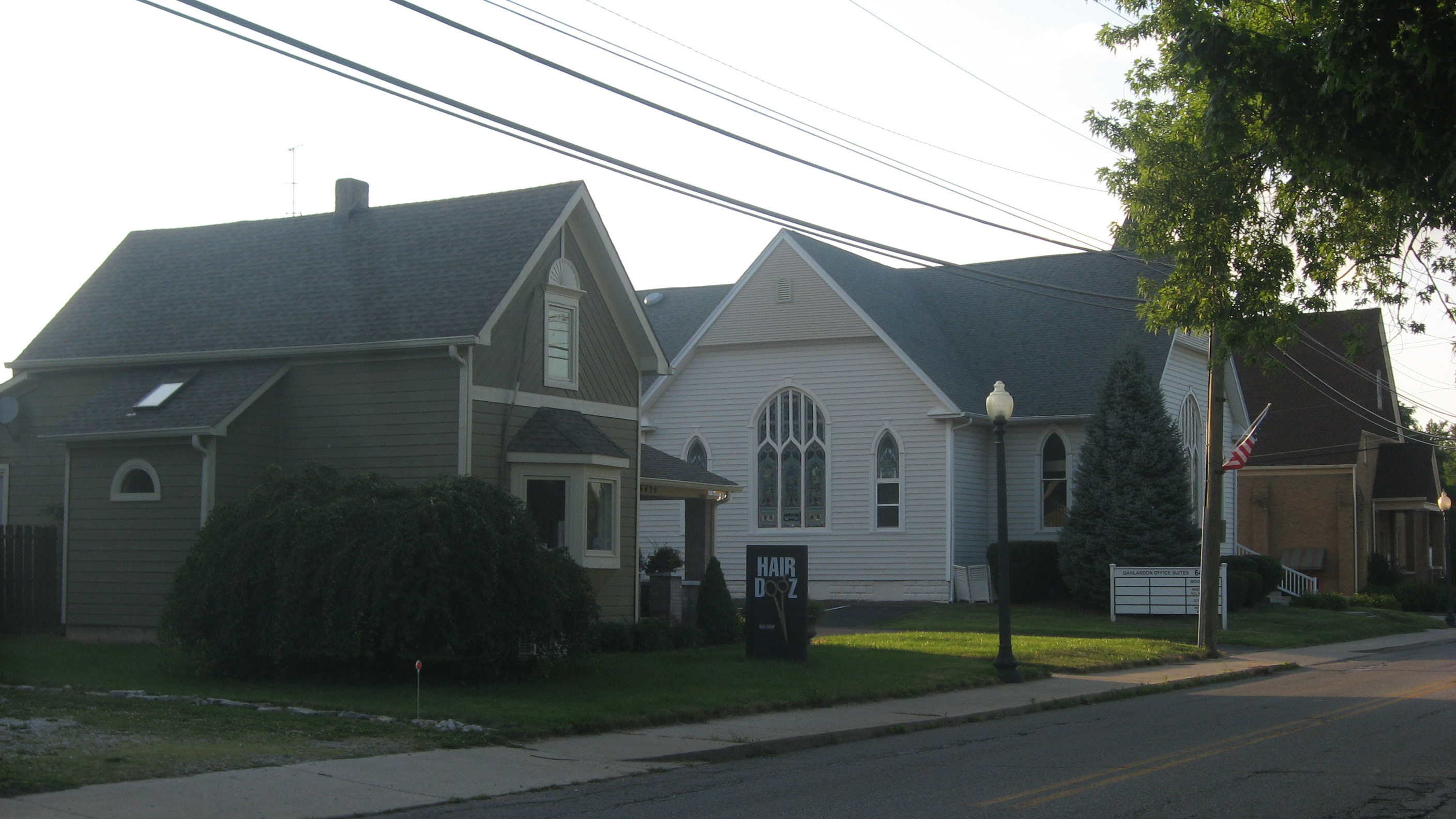
- North on Oaklandon from Nogales, July 2013

- Location within Indianapolis Location within Indiana Location within the United States
- Location: 6300 and 6400 blocks of Oaklandon Rd., the 6400 block of Maple St., and 11716 Oshawa St., Indianapolis, Indiana
- Coordinates: 39°52′30″N 85°57′26″W
- Area: 10 acres (4.0 ha)
- Architectural style: Classical Revival, Late Gothic Revival, Bungalow/craftsman
- NRHP reference No.: 13000724
- Added to NRHP: September 18, 2013

Oaklandon Historic District is a national historic district located at Indianapolis, Indiana. It encompasses 38 contributing buildings in the mid-19th century settlement of Oaklandon. The district developed between about 1908 and 1941, and includes representative examples of Classical Revival, Late Gothic Revival, and Bungalow / American Craftsman style architecture. Notable buildings include the Oaklandon Christian Church (1908), Oaklandon Universalist Church (1921), and Dr. Charles J. Kneer Residence (1923).

It was listed on the National Register of Historic Places in 2013.

== See also ==
- National Register of Historic Places listings in Marion County, Indiana
