= A Danger to Society =

1970 Canadian film

- French: Danger pour la société
- Directed by: Jean Martimbeau
- Written by: Jean Martimbeau
- Produced by: Jean Martimbeau
- Starring: Paolo Noël; Rita Bibeau; Carole Lemaire
- Cinematography: Théo Egsleder; Ros. Roworski
- Edited by: Manon Chrétien; Marie-Hélène Guillemin; Jean Martimbeau
- Music by: Pierre Boisvert; Niko
- Distributed by: France Film
- Release date: January 30, 1970
- Running time: 65 minutes
- Country: Canada
- Language: French

A Danger to Society (French: Danger pour la société) is a Canadian drama film, directed by Jean Martimbeau and released in 1970. The film stars Paolo Noël as Rosaire, a man who is trying to live life on the straight and narrow after spending time in prison, but is being tempted back toward a life of crime after finding his ability to support himself and his family complicated by social prejudices against reformed criminals.

The cast also includes Rita Bibeau as Rosaire's wife Hélène and Carole Lemaire as his daughter Nicole, as well as Rolland d'Amour, Claudette Delorimier and Jacques Bilodeau in supporting roles.

The film was shot in 1969, and released to theatres in January 1970.

The film was entered into competition at the 22nd Canadian Film Awards.
