= Trina McQueen =

Canadian journalist and broadcasting executive

- Born: Catherine Margaret Janitch; 1943 (age 82–83); Belleville, Ontario
- Spouse: Don McQueen(m. 1970; d. 2015)

Catherine Margaret "Trina" McQueen, OC (born 1943) is a Canadian journalist and broadcasting executive.

She was born Catherine Margaret Janitch in Belleville, Ontario and was educated at Belleville Collegiate, going on to receive a BJ from Carleton University. She also studied at the University of British Columbia. McQueen worked as a journalist for the Ottawa Journal. She then worked for CFTO television in Toronto. McQueen was one of the two anchors for the first year of CTV News' W5. In 1967, she became an editor for CBC News in Toronto. In 1976, McQueen was named executive producer for The National. She became CBC's network program director in 1980.

In 1988, McQueen became director (later vice-president) for news, current affairs and Newsworld. In 1993, she left CBC to join Netstar Communications to work on its application for a Canadian broadcast license for a Discovery Channel, subsequently becoming president for the new channel. When CTV bought Netstar in 1999, McQueen became executive vice-president for CTV. She became president and chief operating officer the following year. McQueen retired in August 2002. In 2016, she was named vice-chair for TVOntario's board of directors.

She served as chair for the television board of the Canadian Association of Broadcasters and the Banff Television Foundation Board, also serving on the board of Telefilm Canada and the Canadian Television Fund.

McQueen is adjunct professor in the Arts and Media department of the Schulich School of Business at York University. She also served on the board of governors for the University of Waterloo. She has also served on the board of directors for various organizations, including the CBC, the Canadian Opera Company, PEN Canada, the Canadian Institute for Advanced Research, Historica Canada and the Academy of Canadian Cinema & Television.

She married Don McQueen in 1970; the couple had one daughter. He died in 2015.

In 2002, she was named to the Canadian Association of Broadcasters Hall of Fame. McQueen was named an officer in the Order of Canada in 2005.

In 2018, she was inducted into the CBC News Hall of Fame.
