= Jon Granik =

Jon Granik (December 10, 1930 - October 29, 2003) was a Canadian actor. Although he had radio, film, television and stage roles throughout his career, he ultimately became best known as a narrator of documentary films.

Born and raised in the small rural hamlet of Pakan, Alberta, he moved to Edmonton in 1947 to attend the University of Alberta, studying modern languages while pursuing acting with community theatres due to the lack of a drama department at the university in that era. He moved to Toronto in 1954, beginning his career with stage roles for Theatre '49 and the Stratford Festival, and soon appearing in episodes of television series such as Playbill, Hawkeye and the Last of the Mohicans, Cannonball and Hudson's Bay.

In 1966 he had his first role in a film, playing an Indigenous Canadian warrior in The Trap. In 1970 he had his first leading role in a film, as the title character in The Last Act of Martin Weston.

Through the 1970s and 1980s he had principally supporting rather than lead roles in film and television, but continued to work extensively in radio and as a documentary narrator, and was a regular performer of commercial voice-overs.

With Colin Fox, he was a narrator of Islam, a 1972 CBC Television documentary series about Islam. For his work on the series, he received a nomination for the Earle Grey Award at the 2nd ACTRA Awards in 1973.

In the 1980s he hosted Verdict, a Global Television Network true crime anthology series. In the early 1990s he hosted Music from Castles and Chateaux, a documentary series on classical music for VisionTV.

He died on October 29, 2003, in Toronto.

== Filmography ==
=== Film ===
- The Trap - 1966
- The Best Damn Fiddler from Calabogie to Kaladar - 1968
- Good Times, Bad Times - 1969
- The Last Act of Martin Weston - 1970
- Fortune and Men's Eyes - 1971
- Selling Out - 1972
- Ragtime Summer - 1977
- Power Play - 1978
- In Praise of Older Women - 1978
- Virus - 1980
- Final Assignment - 1980
- Escape from Iran: The Canadian Caper - 1981
- Hot Money - 1986
- Keeping Track - 1986
- The Beer Drinker's Guide to Fitness and Filmmaking - 1987

=== Television ===
- Playbill - 1955, one episode
- Hawkeye and the Last of the Mohicans - 1957, three episodes
- On Camera - 1955-58, two episodes
- Folio - 1955-58, three episodes
- General Motors Theatre - 1955-60, six episodes
- Cannonball - 1958, one episode
- Hudson's Bay - 1959, three episodes
- The Unforeseen - 1959-60, six episodes
- The Littlest Hobo - 1964, one episode
- The Forest Rangers - 1964, one episode
- Seaway - 1966, one episode
- Wojeck - 1968, two episodes
- Quentin Durgens, M.P. - 1969, one episode
- The Cube - 1969
- Strange Paradise - 1969-70, 29 episodes
- Very Special Shoes - 1970
- McQueen - 1970, one episode
- Program X - 1970-72, two episodes
- The Tenth Decade - 1971
- The Megantic Outlaw - 1971
- Islam - 1972
- Follow the North Star - 1972
- Dr. Simon Locke - 1972-74, three episodes
- To See Ourselves - 1973, one episode
- Salty - 1974, one episode
- Canadian Film Makers - 1974
- The Heatwave Lasted Four Days - 1975
- Sidestreet - 1975, one episode
- The Littlest Hobo - 1981, one episode
- 33 Brompton Place - 1982
- Night Heat - 1985, one episode
- Evergreen - 1985, one episode
- Adderly - 1987, one episode
- Street Legal - 1990, one episode
- Divided Loyalties - 1990
- E.N.G. - 1990, one episode
- T. and T. - 1990, one episode
- To Catch a Killer - 1992
- Peacekeepers - 1997
- Chasing Cain - 2001
- Veritas: The Quest - 2003, one episode
