= Heather Jones =

Canadian field hockey player

Personal information
- Full name: Heather D. E. Jones
- Born: October 8, 1970 (age 55) Edmonton, Alberta, Canada

Sport
- Sport: Field hockey
Medal record
Women's field hockey
Representing Canada
Pan American Games
Silver medal – second place	1991 Havana	Team competition

Heather D. E. Jones (born October 8, 1970) is a former field hockey player from Canada, who represented her native country at the 1992 Summer Olympics in Barcelona, Spain. There she ended up in seventh place with the Canadian National Women's Team.

Born in Edmonton, Alberta, Jones attended the University of Alberta, competing for the Pandas Field Hockey team from 1988 to 1994.
