= Greg Ip =

Canadian-American journalist (born 1964)

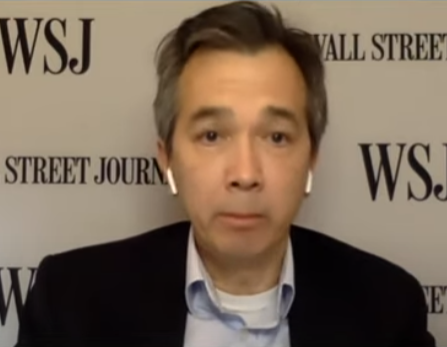
- At the 2021 World Economic Forum
- Born: June 18, 1964 (age 62); Canada
- Education: Carleton University
- Occupation: Journalist

Greg Ip (born June 18, 1964) is a Canadian-American journalist, currently the chief economics commentator for The Wall Street Journal. A native of Canada, Ip received a bachelor's degree in economics and journalism from Carleton University in Ottawa, Ontario. He lives in Bethesda, Maryland.

== Career ==
After graduating from Carleton, Ip began his journalism career as a reporter for The Vancouver Sun from May to December 1989. He then joined the Financial Post as an economics and financial reporter covering Canada in January 1990 and later transferred to Washington, D.C., as a correspondent. In September 1995, he became a business and economics reporter for The Globe and Mail in Toronto.

Ip joined The Wall Street Journal in 1996, first as a reporter covering financial markets in New York and then as chief economics correspondent in Washington, D.C., where he created Real Time Economics. He left the Journal in 2008 to become the U.S. economics editor of The Economist and returned as chief economics commentator in January 2015.

He is the author of The Little Book of Economics: How the Economy Works in the Real World. Reviewers praised the book for its accessibility to non-economists and for demonstrating the relevance of economic theory to current events. Ip has studied the probabilities of various regions suffering economic crises. In 2002, an article coauthored with John D. McKinnon was part of a set of ten articles that resulted in the Wall Street Journal staff being awarded a Pulitzer Prize for Breaking News Reporting.

== Awards ==
- 2008 - William Brewster Styles Award

== Books ==
- The Little Book of Economics: How the Economy Works in the Real World (2010)
- No Way Out?: Government Intervention and the Financial Crisis (2013)
- Foolproof: Why Safety Can Be Dangerous and How Danger Makes Us Safe (2015)
