= Paul Watson (journalist) =

Canadian photojournalist

Paul Richard Watson
- Born: 13 July 1959 (age 67); Weston, Ontario, Canada
- Education: Carleton University, Master's degree in international affairs from Columbia University
- Occupation: Journalist
- Spouse: Shum Sai Hung
- Children: 1
- Website: www.arcticstarcreativity.com

Paul Richard Watson (born July 13, 1959) is a Canadian photojournalist, Pulitzer Prize-winner, and author of three books: Where War Lives, Magnum Revolution: 65 Years of Fighting for Freedom, and Ice Ghosts: The Epic Hunt for the Lost Franklin Expedition (2017). The Guardian newspaper named ICE GHOSTS one of the best science books of 2017. The CBC, Canada’s national broadcaster, put Ice Ghosts at the top of its 2017 "Holiday Gift Guide: 12 Books for the Science and Nature Enthusiast on Your List."

== Biography ==
Watson was born in Weston, Ontario. He was awarded the 1994 Pulitzer Prize for Spot News Photography for his photograph, taken in 1993 while covering the civil war in Somalia for the Toronto Star newspaper. The photograph depicted US Army 160th SOAR, Super 64 crew chief Staff Sgt. William Cleveland's body being dragged by Somalis through the streets of Mogadishu.

His reporting and photography spans almost three decades and includes conflicts in more than a dozen countries on several continents. Among those are: Eritrea, Somalia, southern Sudan, Angola, Mozambique, South Africa, Romania, Serbia, and Kosovo, as well as Afghanistan, Pakistan, Kashmir, Iraq, and Syria.

While at the Toronto Star, Watson earned four Canadian National Newspaper Awards for photography and stories on the child sex trade in Asia, anarchy in Somalia following the 1991 overthrow of dictator Mohammed Siad Barre, and the torture and murder of a Somali teen by Canadian soldiers after a U.S.-led force intervened to end a famine in 1992.

He received the Drummer General’s Award in 2007 for his book Where War Lives, based on his experiences as a war journalist. The Globe and Mail of Toronto named it one of the "year’s 100 most notable books".

His second book, Magnum Revolution: 65 Years of Fighting for Freedom, showcases the legendary agency's photographers' images of, and personal insights into uprisings spanning almost seven decades. It was co-written with The New Yorker's Jon Lee Anderson and published by Prestel in Europe, the U.S., and Canada in 2012.

Watson was featured in director Martyn Burke's 2012 documentary Under Fire: Journalists in Combat, which was shortlisted for an Academy Award. The film won a prestigious Peabody Award in 2013.

His work is on permanent display at the Newseum, in Washington, D.C., in the journalism museum's Pulitzer Prize Photographs Gallery.

Watson is also the subject of the Kennedy Award-winning play by Dan O'Brien entitled The Body of an American, staged in London in 2014. The collaboration led to O'Brien's book of poetry War Reporter, published in the U.S. and Europe in 2013.

Paul Watson holds a Master's Degree from Columbia University's School of International and Public Affairs in New York. He was the South Asia bureau chief for the Los Angeles Times, where his coverage area included Afghanistan, Pakistan, India, and Iraq. He was Southeast Asia bureau chief, based in Jakarta when he left the Los Angeles Times to return to The Toronto Star in July 2009. He also served as Balkans bureau chief for the LA Times during his decade as a foreign correspondent with the newspaper.

In 2015, Watson resigned from the Toronto Star, where he was a multi-media reporter covering the Arctic and Aboriginal beat. He also did foreign assignments in Afghanistan, Syria, Russia, and India in his second stint at The Toronto Star, which is Canada's largest circulation daily newspaper. He wrote that his resignation followed The Star's decision to kill an investigative story into the then Conservative government of Prime Minister Stephen Harper, which planned to use the historic 2014 discovery of the wreck of Sir John Franklin's flagship, HMS Erebus, for political propaganda. The story was then published by BuzzFeed and won a silver Canadian National Magazine Award for investigative reporting, as well as a silver Digital Publishing Award for long-form storytelling.

Watson was the only journalist aboard CCGS Sir Wilfrid Laurier, a Canadian Coast Guard icebreaker, the lead vessel in the 2014 Victoria Strait Expedition, when archeologists aboard found Erebus in eastern Queen Maud Gulf, in the same area where Inuit had said for generations a large ship went down. Watson tells the story of the hunt for the lost Franklin Expedition in his 2017 book Ice Ghosts. In 2018, Ice Ghosts was a finalist for the Hubert Evans Non-Fiction Prize.

== Awards ==
- Pulitzer Prize for Spot News Photography, 1994
- National Magazine Award (Silver), 2016
- Digital Publishing Award (Silver), 2016
- Robert Capa Gold Medal, Overseas Press Club of America.
- George Polk Award, foreign reporting
- Freedom of the Press Award, National Press Club (USA), Washington, D.C.
- Hal Boyle Award, foreign reporting, Overseas Press Club of America
- South Asian Journalists Association’s Daniel Pearl Award, honouring the best print reporting from the region, for coverage of Afghanistan
- Canadian National Newspaper Awards
