= Isabelle Turcotte Baird =

Canadian triathlete

Personal information
- Born: September 24, 1970 (age 54); Quebec City, Quebec, Canada

Sport
- Sport: Triathlon

Isabelle Turcotte Baird (born September 24, 1970 in Quebec City, Quebec) is an athlete from Canada. She competes in the triathlon.

Baird competed at the first Olympic triathlon at the 2000 Summer Olympics. She took thirty-first place with a total time of 2:08:29.49.
