= Stephen Reynolds (artist) =

Australian artist

Stephen Sarre Reynolds
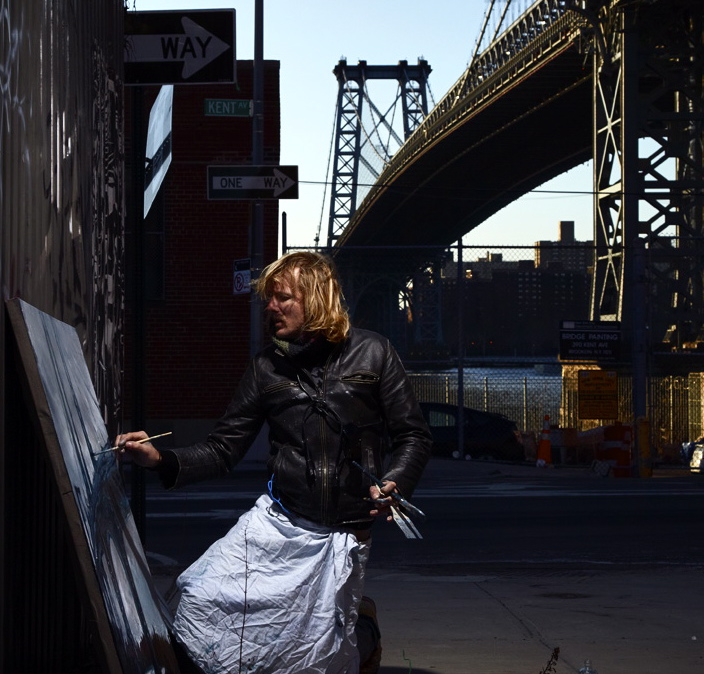
- Reynolds paints En plein air at the East River, New York
- Born: 3 February 1974 (age 52); Melbourne, Victoria, Australia
- Spouse: Sarah Chuldenko
- Children: 2

Stephen Sarre Reynolds (born 3 February 1974), is an Australia-born artist, currently residing in Los Angeles.

== Biography ==
Reynolds was born to Richard and Coralie Reynolds of Melbourne. Educated at Xavier College Melbourne, he was both Prefect and House President, graduating in 1991.

Completing tertiary education at Melbourne University and Sydney University, he graduated with a Bachelor of Arts (History/Political Science) in 1996.

Reynolds is married to Sarah Chuldenko Reynolds, step granddaughter of former United States president Jimmy Carter.

== Music ==
From 1998 to 2004, Reynolds was guitarist, songwriter and founding member of Australian punk/rock act The Surrogate. EP releases in 2002 ("Gentleman's Hardcore") and 2004 ("Quell Dommage") garnered significant airplay on the Australian national broadcaster TripleJ. The second EP was released after signing to Universal Music Publishing Group in the same year. Reynolds left the group soon after and relocated to the United States after travelling in Europe and Asia.

== Artistic work ==
Reynolds' first solo exhibition was at the Patrizia Autore Gallery in Melbourne in 2001. He has subsequently been in over two dozen group exhibitions in Melbourne, Los Angeles and New York, including 'Endurance' at the Abington Art Center in Philadelphia, PA, 2009, 3docUmenT (42nd St, New York), with ChaShaMa and Tension/Release at Caren Golden Fine Art, Chelsea, New York.

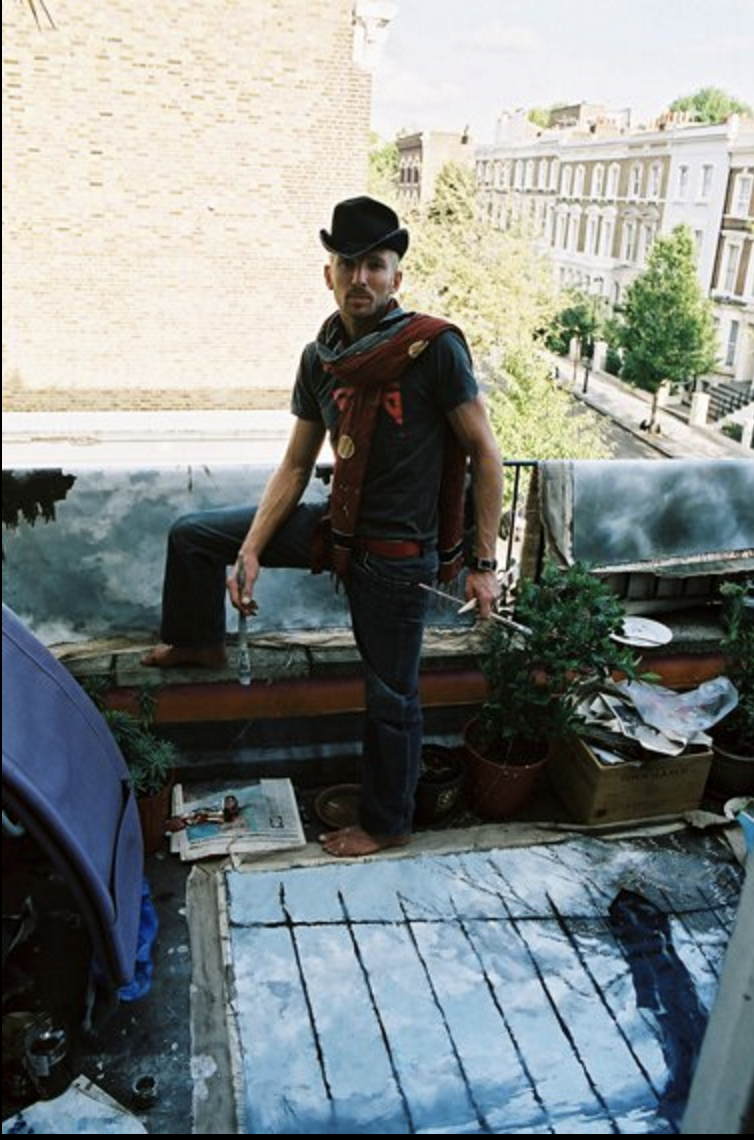
Reynolds at his studio in London

Solo exhibitions include 'Secret and Whisper' (Melbourne, 2004) 'Come In From the River' at New York's La Maison d'Art, (New York, 2010), 'Where After the Valley?' (Los Angeles River, 2014, with support from the US Army Corps of Engineers

Reynolds was co-founder of the underground New York art collective x+rey, active from 2004 to 2008.

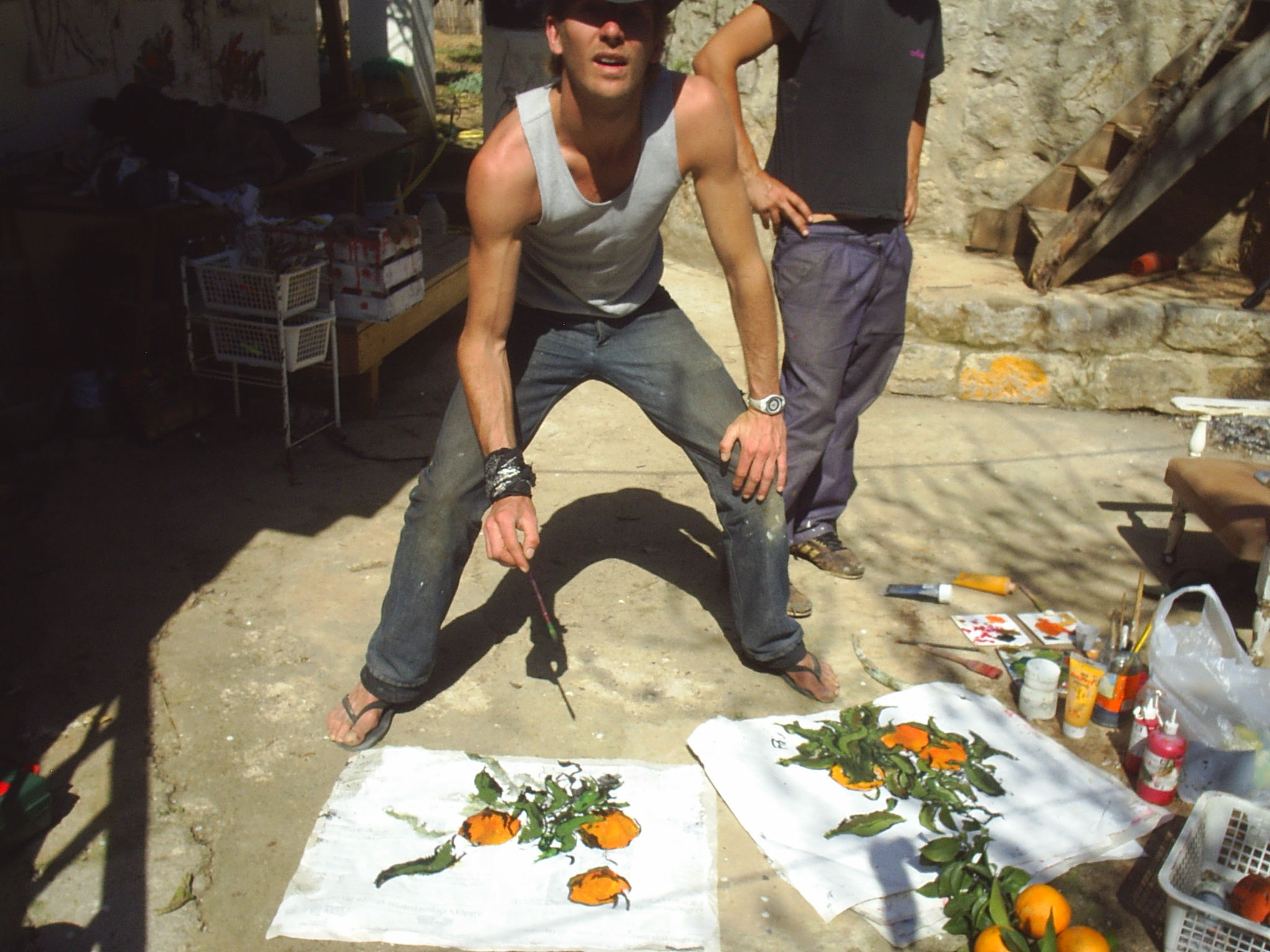
A photograph of Reynolds at his studio in Ibiza, Spain

During this time, Reynolds began working as a director and freelance photographer for Getty Images, contributing work to the Obama 2008 campaign. He has directed, photographed and edited over 150 music videos, shorts and commercials including over 40 videos for Australian retail giant Cotton On Group. In 2006, he wrote and directed the television advertising campaign for the Democratic Nominee for US Senate (NV), and for Jason Carter, the Democratic Gubernatorial candidate for Georgia in 2014.

He has worked building sculptures for various Disneyland theme parks (LA, Orlando, Tokyo) and garnered international acclaim for his installation for Cara Delevingne (the #vaginatunnel) which ranked as the third most widely covered artwork in global media in 2021. Notable outlets include Architectural Digest, an editorial inThe Guardian, and a segment on The Late Show with Stephen Colbert.

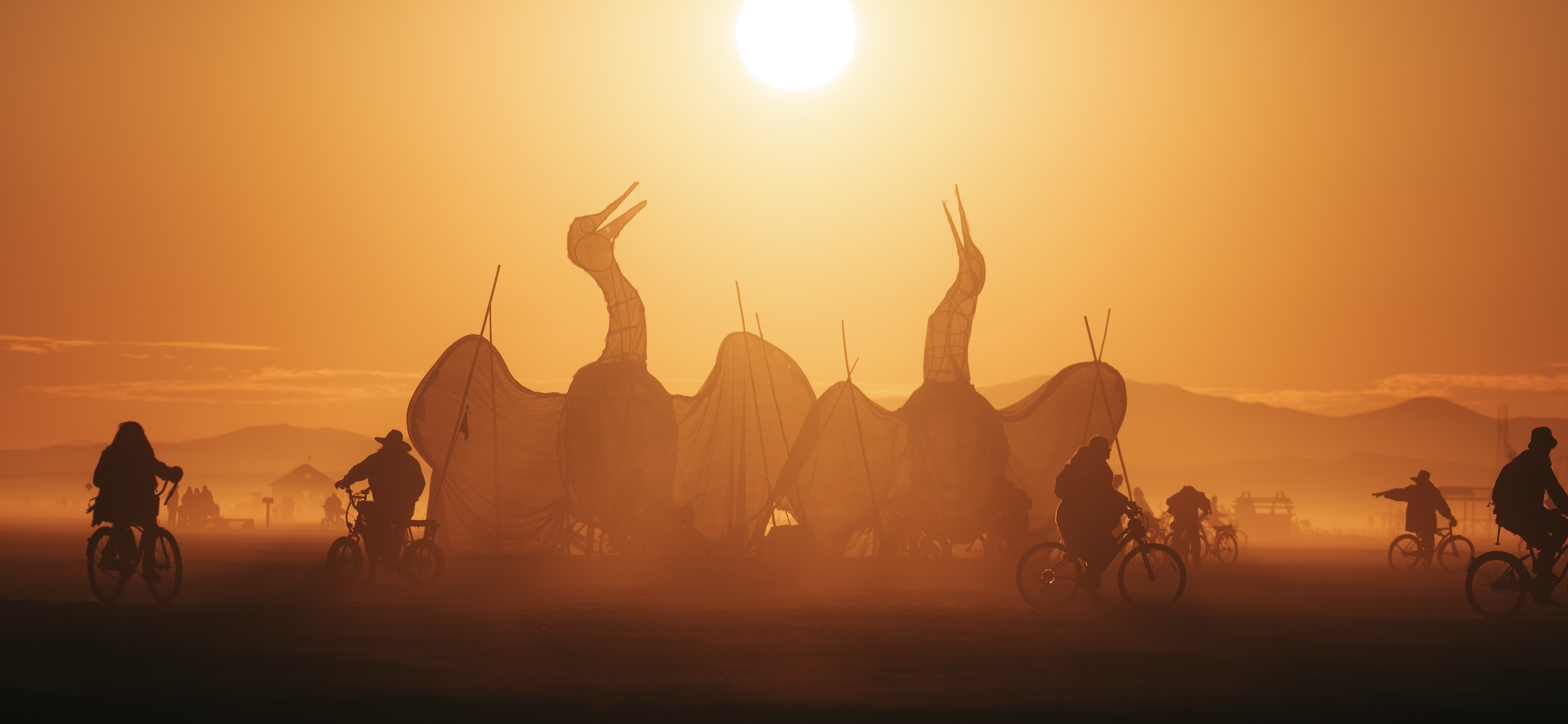
"Nested Heart", by Mayan Warrior, 2025

In December 2024, Reynolds presented Desecration: The Poetry of Rebellion', a site-specific painting exhibition in Hollywood, California, exploring themes of protest, violence, fine art and survival in urban environments.

In 2025, Reynolds was awarded a Burning Man Honorarium grant for his large scale installation Nested Heart:

Originally conceived as a work about vulnerability and reflection before embarking on new challenges, the piece took on new meaning during the event. Subjected to record-breaking winds and severe desert storms, Nested Heart endured intact, becoming a visceral symbol of resistance and defiance in the face of unprecedented challenges.

In 2026 Reynolds founded MonumentuM - an artist-led project focussed on curating and installing large-scale installations at luxury destinations worldwide.

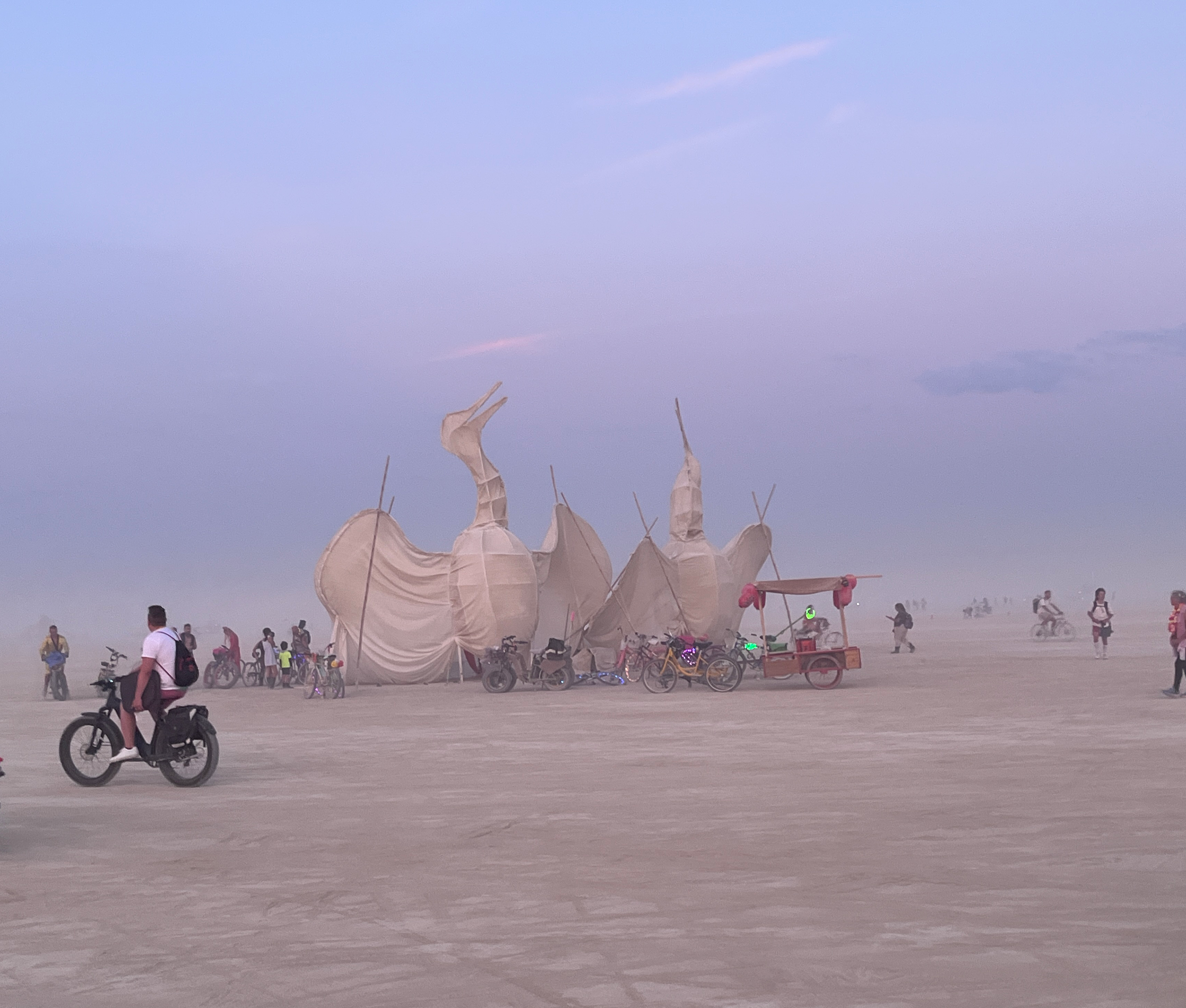
"Nested Heart", Burning Man 2025

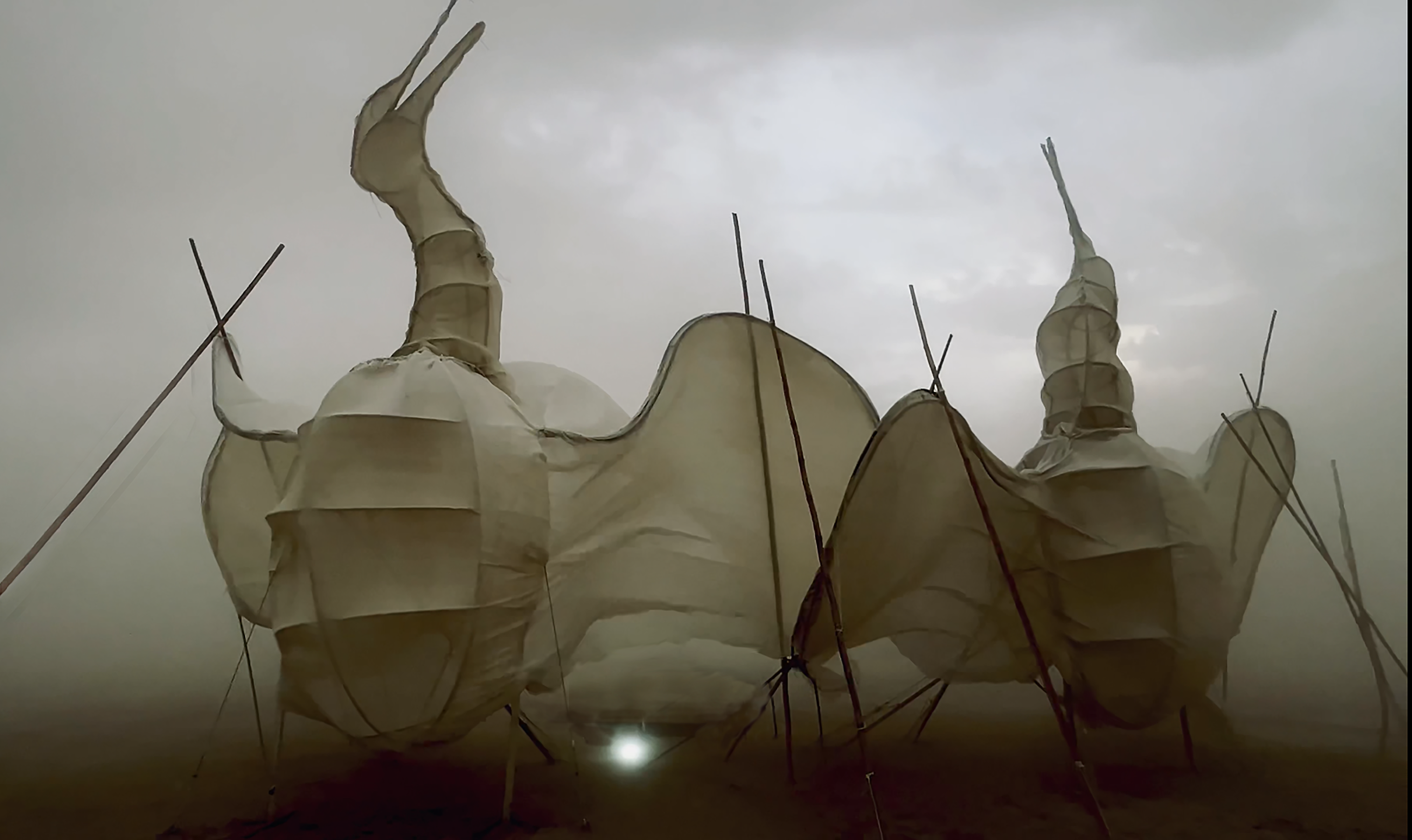
"Nested Heart", Burning Man 2025
