= Countdown Canada =

1970 made-for television film

Countdown Canada is a 1970 made-for television film directed by Rob Fothergill and was broadcast on CBC Television.

== Summary ==
A dramatized documentary commenting on the last days of Canada's independence before becoming part of the United States.

== See also ==
- The War Game
- Ghostwatch
- The War of the Worlds (Orson Welles's 1938 radio broadcast)
