= Peter O'Brian (film producer) =

Canadian film producer and broadcast executive

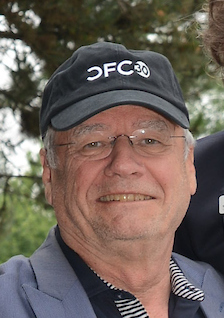
- Peter O'Brian at the 2018 CFC Annual Garden Party
- Born: 1947 (age 78–79); Toronto, Ontario
- Occupation: film producer
- Known for: Genie Award winner
- Spouse: Hon. Carolyn Bennett

Peter O'Brian (born 1947) is a Canadian film producer and writer.

Born in Toronto, he was educated at the University of Toronto and Emerson College, Boston, graduating in 1969 with a B.A. in English Literature and Film Studies. He returned to Toronto and began working in film production.

In 1975, he produced Rex Bromfield's ‘Love at First Sight’, then Associate Producer on Richard Benner's ‘Outrageous!’ in 1976. In 1977, he founded Independent Pictures Inc, which has won nineteen Canadian Academy Genie Awards.

Subsequent credits include Paul Lynch's ‘Blood And Guts’, David Cronenberg's ‘Fast Company’, Phillip Borsos’ ‘The Grey Fox’ (Golden Globe nominee, Best Foreign Film, 1983), ‘One Magic Christmas’, and ‘Far From Home’, Sandy Wilson's ‘My American Cousin’, Gordon Pinsent's ‘John and the Missus.’

He took time away from producing in the early 1990s to serve as Executive Director of the Canadian Film Centre and later as Executive Producer of its Feature Film Project, and also as its Producer-in-Residence. He joined the Board of the Toronto International Film Festival (TIFF) from 1983 to 1996.

In 2002, he directed ‘Hollywood North’, a backstage comedy about making movies in Canada during the tax break era.

In 2005, he was appointed chair of the Board of TVO, the province of Ontario's public educational television network and media organization, until 2018.

In 2015, he produced Daniel Roher's ‘Survivors Rowe’, about sex abuse in the fly-in communities of Northwest Ontario, which was nominated as Best Documentary Programme at the 2016 Canadian Screen Awards.

O’Brian is an Honorary Life Member of the Directors Guild of Canada and a recipient of the Queen Elizabeth Diamond Jubilee Medal.

Peter O’Brian lives in Toronto and Copenhagen. He is married to Canadian Ambassador to Denmark and former federal Cabinet Minister, Hon. Dr. Carolyn Bennett. They have two sons.

Preceded by Isabel Bassett	Chair of TVOntario; 2005-	Succeeded by
