= The Johari Window (film) =

1970 Canadian film

- Music by: Larry Crosley
- Production company: Carleton University School of Journalism
- Release date: March 20, 1970
- Country: Canada
- Language: English

The Johari Window is a Canadian experimental docudrama film, created by a collective of Carleton University School of Journalism students and released in 1970. The film blends various vignettes about university student life with segments in which the students are participating in seminars on the Johari window framework of personality assessment.

The film was made in 1968 and 1969, with technical post-production work on the film done by various professional film crew in the Ottawa area, including music by composer Larry Crosley.

It premiered in March 1970 at Carleton, and was later screened in Toronto at Gerald Pratley's Ontario Film Institute.

The film was entered into competition at the 22nd Canadian Film Awards.
