= The Life and Times of Chester-Angus Ramsgood =

1970 film by David Curnick

- Directed by: David Curnick
- Written by: David Curnick
- Produced by: Don Wilson
- Starring: Robert Mason; Mary-Beth McGuffin; David Curnick; Ed Astley
- Cinematography: David Curnick
- Edited by: David Curnick
- Release date: April 26, 1970 (Vancouver)
- Running time: 93 minutes
- Country: Canada
- Language: English

The Life and Times of Chester-Angus Ramsgood is a Canadian crime comedy film, directed by David Curnick and released in 1970. The film stars Robert Mason as Chester-Angus Ramsgood, a university student whose date with Mary McPhee (Mary-Beth McGuffin) goes awry and ends up with her parents banning her from ever seeing him again, resulting in his friends Ray (Curnick) and Morris (Ed Astley) concocting a plan to help him win her back by kidnapping her younger brother so that Chester-Angus can rescue him.

Curnick made the film entirely independently, on a budget of just $17,000. The film was originally released in April 1970 as a 93-minute film, but after receiving feedback about the strongest and weakest aspects of the film, Curnick edited it down to a shorter 61-minute version before distributing it on a tour of college campuses.

Critics generally labelled the film as flawed but passable, with Michael Walsh of The Province stating that the most remarkable thing about it was that Curnick had managed to make it at all without studio backing. Walsh also praised Curnick's cinematography as the strongest aspect of the film.

The film was submitted to the 23rd Canadian Film Awards in 1971.
