= Michael Jacot =

Canadian filmmaker (1924–2006)

- Born: July 8, 1924; London, England
- Died: October 5, 2006 (aged 82); Guelph, Ontario, Canada
- Occupations: filmmaker, writer, playwright

Michael Jacot (July 8, 1924 – October 5, 2006) was a British-born Canadian filmmaker and writer. He was most noted for his 1970 film The Last Act of Martin Weston, which premiered in competition at the 22nd Canadian Film Awards, and his 1973 novel The Last Butterfly, which was adapted into the Czech drama film The Last Butterfly in 1991.

Born in England, Jacot worked as a codebreaker for the British military during World War II, and moved to Toronto, Ontario, soon after the end of the war. Through his firm Michael Jacot Productions, he wrote, directed and produced dramatic and documentary films for the Canadian Broadcasting Corporation in the 1960s, most notably the Dieppe Raid docudrama Rehearsal for Invasion in 1960. His play Honour Thy Father was performed by Toronto's Crest Theatre in 1960.

Jacot had planned for The Last Act of Martin Weston, his debut feature film, to be set and shot in Canada; however, after he failed to secure funding from the Canadian Film Development Corporation, he instead reached a deal with the Czech production firm Barrandov Studios to shoot the film in Prague. He had several other film scripts planned for development around the same time, including Eyes of the Night and The Draft Dodger, although there is no record of any of the other films going into production.

He published the novel The Last Butterfly in 1973. He later published other books, including Honour Thy Father and Wind from Across the Water.

He died in 2006 in Guelph, Ontario.
