= The Last Act of Martin Weston =

1970 film by Martin Jacot

- Directed by: Michael Jacot
- Written by: Michael Jacot
- Starring: Jon Granik; Nuala Fitzgerald; Milena Dvorská; Al Waxman
- Cinematography: Jiří Tarantík
- Edited by: Anthony Bower
- Music by: Milan Kymlicka
- Production companies: Michael Jacot Productions; Barrandov Studios
- Distributed by: Michael Jacot Productions
- Release date: October 2, 1970
- Running time: 98 minutes
- Country: Canada
- Language: English

The Last Act of Martin Weston is a Canadian-Czech drama film, directed by Michael Jacot and released in 1970. The film stars Jon Granik as Martin Weston, an American businessman working in Prague who is dissatisfied with his life and planning his suicide.

The cast also includes Nuala Fitzgerald, Milena Dvorská and Al Waxman.

The film had originally been planned to be set and shot in Canada; however, after Jacot failed to secure funding from the Canadian Film Development Corporation, he instead reached a deal with the Czech production firm Barrandov Studios to shoot the film in Prague.

The film premiered in competition at the 22nd Canadian Film Awards. It was also later screened at the 1971 Cannes Film Festival as part of Cinema Canada, a non-competitive lineup of Canadian films.
