= Rainy Day Woman (film) =

1970 Canadian film

- Directed by: Ron Hallis
- Written by: Ron Hallis
- Produced by: John Roston
- Starring: Ashley Murray; Helen Keenan
- Cinematography: Ron Hallis
- Edited by: Ron Hallis
- Music by: Leon Aronson
- Production company: Roha Motion Pictures
- Release date: April 5, 1970
- Running time: 84 minutes
- Country: Canada
- Language: English

Rainy Day Woman is a Canadian drama film, directed by Ron Hallis and released in 1970. The film stars Ashley Murray and Helen Keenan as an unhappily married couple whose relationship is tested when the husband begins having an affair with a younger woman.

The cast also includes Linda Henry, Beverly Light, Julie Wildman and Sven Jurshevski.

According to producer John Roston, the film "strikes a peculiar balance between seriousness and comedy. It's not heavy romance but it's not really light fare either. There's a lot of sex in it, but it's not a sexploitation film. Most films made in Canada are either sex films or 'art' films. This one is a marriage of the two."

The film was entered in competition at the 22nd Canadian Film Awards in 1970.
