= List of Canadian films of 1971 =

This is a list of Canadian films which were released in 1971:

Title	Director	Cast	Genre	Notes
Acadia, Acadia (L'Acadie, L'Acadie?!?)	Michel Brault, Pierre Perrault	Documentary		
The Apprentice (Fleur bleue)	Larry Kent	Steve Fiset, Susan Sarandon, Céline Bernier	Crime, drama	
Breathing Together: Revolution of the Electric Family	Morley Markson		Documentary	
The Christmas Martian (Le Martien de Noël)	Bernard Gosselin	Marcel Sabourin, Catherine Leduc	Children's film	Later incorporated into the Tales for All series.
The Crowd Inside	Al Waxman	Geneviève Robert, Alan Dean, Patricia Collins	Drama	
Death of a Legend	Bill Mason		NFB documentary	
Evolution	Michael Mills		NFB animated short	Academy Award nominee
Face-Off	George McCowan	Trudy Young, Art Hindle, John Vernon	Drama	
Fortune and Men's Eyes	Harvey Hart	Wendell Burton, Michael Greer, Danny Freedman	Drama	Canadian Film Award – Supporting Actor (Freedman), Editing
Foxy Lady	Ivan Reitman	Alan Gordon, Eugene Levy, Nicole Morin	Comedy, romance	
The Great Ordinary Movie (Le Grand Film ordinaire)	Roger Frappier	Raymond Cloutier, Paule Baillargeon, Claude Laroche	Experimental feature	
Heads or Tails (Pile ou face)	Roger Fournier	Nathalie Naubert, Diane Arcand, Jean Coutu, Patricia Foster	Comedy	
Hold on to Daddy's Ears (Tiens-toi bien après les oreilles à papa)	Jean Bissonnette	Dominique Michel, Yvon Deschamps, Dabe Broadfoot	Comedy	
Hot Stuff	Zlatko Grgic		NFB animated short	
How Death Came to Earth	Ishu Patel		NFB animated short	
I'm Going to Get You, Elliott Boy	Ed Forsyth	Ross Stephanson, Maureen McGill, Abdullah the Butcher	Prison drama	
IXE-13	Jacques Godbout	André Dubois, Louise Forestier, Serge Grenier, Marc Laurendeau	Musical comedy	
Madeleine Is...	Sylvia Spring	Nicola Lipman, John Juliani	Drama	First Canadian feature directed by a woman
The Master Cats (Les chats bottés)	Claude Fournier			
A Matter of Life (Question de vie)	André Théberge	Josée Beauregard, Frédérique Collin, Valda Dalton	Drama	
The Megantic Outlaw	Ron Kelly	Gary McKeehan, Sydney Brown, Jane Mallett, Carole Lazare, Lloyd Bochner	Drama	
The Men (Les Mâles)	Gilles Carle	Donald Pilon, René Blouin, Andrée Pelletier	Comedy	
Mon oncle Antoine	Claude Jutra	Jean Duceppe, Olivette Thibault, Claude Jutra, Monique Mercure	National Film Board drama	AV Preservation Trust Masterwork
My Eye (Mon œil)	Jean Pierre Lefebvre	Raôul Duguay	Drama	
The Neon Palace	Peter Rowe	Judy Soroka, Sweet Daddy Siki	Experimental feature	Canadian Film Award – Special Award
North of Superior	Graeme Ferguson		Documentary	First IMAX short made for Ontario Place, the first purpose-built IMAX theatre in the world.
The Only Thing You Know	Clarke Mackey	Ann Knox, John Denos, Allan Royal	Drama	Canadian Film Awards – Actress (Knox), Special Award
Les Philharmonistes	Yves Leduc		NFB documentary	
Propaganda Message	Barrie Nelson		NFB animated short	
The Proud Rider	Walter Baczynsky	Michael Bell, Scott Colomby, Art Hindle	Drama	
Proxyhawks	Jack Darcus	Jack Darcus, Susan Spencer, Edward Hutchings	Drama	
La Région Centrale	Michael Snow		Structural film	
The Reincarnate	Don Haldane	Jack Creley, Jay Reynolds, Trudy Young	Horror	
Rip-Off	Donald Shebib	Don Scardino, Ralph Endersby, Michael Kukulewich	Drama	
Sex in the Snow (Après-ski)	Roger Cardinal	Daniel Pilon, Céline Lomez	Sex comedy	
Stop	Jean Beaudin	Raymond Bouchard, Danielle Naud, Marie Tifo	Drama	
Synchromy	Norman McLaren		NFB animated short	
This Is a Photograph	Albert Kish		Documentary	
Those Damned Savages (Les Maudits sauvages)	Jean Pierre Lefebvre		Drama	
Tiki Tiki	Gerald Potterton		Comedy	Original animation intercut with recontextualized footage from the 1966 Russian live action film Aybolit-66.
Water, Water Everywhere... (Heureux comme un poisson dans l'eau...)	Gilles Blais		Documentary	
We Are Far from the Sun (On est loin du soleil)	Jacques Leduc	Marthe Nadeau, J.-Léo Gagnon	Docudrama	A film about the life of Brother André

== See also ==
- 1971 in Canada
- 1971 in Canadian television
