= 23rd Canadian Film Awards =

Canadian film awards ceremony

- Date: October 1, 1971
- Location: Royal York Hotel, Toronto, Ontario
- Hosted by: Leslie Nielsen; Charlotte Gobeil

Highlights
- Most awards: Mon oncle Antoine
- Best Picture: Mon oncle Antoine

The 23rd Canadian Film Awards were held on October 1, 1971 to honour achievements in Canadian film. The ceremony, which had been returned to banquet format, was hosted by actor Leslie Nielsen and broadcaster Charlotte Gobeil.

For this year's competition, 149 films were entered, but Quebec independent filmmakers refused to submit their films, citing "lack of interest" and taking issue with the insufficient representation of Montreal in the awards committee. The result was that, with the exception of films from the National Film Board of Canada, all awarded films were English-language.

== Winners ==
=== Films ===
- Film of the Year: not awarded
- Best Picture: Mon oncle Antoine (My Uncle Antoine) — National Film Board of Canada, Marc Beaudet producer, Claude Jutra director
- Documentary Under 30 Minutes: The Sea — National Film Board of Canada, Bill Brind, Tom Daly and Colin Low producers, Bané Jovanovic director
- Documentary Over 30 Minutes: Les Philharmonistes — National Film Board of Canada, François Séguillon producer, Yves Leduc director
- Theatrical Short: Don't Knock the Ox — National Film Board of Canada, William Canning producer, Tony Ianzelo director
- Animated: Evolution — National Film Board of Canada, Michael Mills producer and director
- Arts and Experimental:
  - Essai à la mille (Test to the Thousand) — Jean-Claude Labrecque
  - Found Sculpture: Victor Tinkl — ETV, Christopher Homer
- TV Drama: The Megantic Outlaw — Canadian Broadcasting Corporation, Ron Kelly producer and director
- TV Information: The Human Journey: The Early Years — Films Incorporated and CTV Television Network, Jerry Lawton producer and director
- Nature and Wildlife: Temples of Time — National Film Board of Canada, William Canning producer and director
- Travel and Recreation:
  - Alberta: Under the Sun — Chinook Films, C. N. Ross and Eric Jensen producers
  - Ski de Fond (Cross-Country Skiing) — National Film Board of Canada, François Séguillon producer, Roger Rochat director
- Public Relations: Shebandowan: A Summer Place — Westminster Films, Lee Gordon and Don Haldane producers
- Sales Promotion: Containerization — Canawest Films, Brant E. Ducey producer
- Training and Instruction: It Starts at the Top — Chetwynd Films, Arthur Chetwynd and Ross McConnell producers, Ross McConnell director

=== Feature Film Craft Awards ===
- Performance by a Lead Actor: Jean Duceppe - Mon oncle Antoine (NFB)
- Performance by a Lead Actress: Ann Knox - The Only Thing You Know (Clarke Mackey Films)
- Supporting Actor: Danny Freedman - Fortune and Men's Eyes (Cinemex/MGM)
- Supporting Actress: Olivette Thibault - Mon oncle Antoine (NFB)
- Art Direction: Aleksandr Kuznetsov - Tiki Tiki (Potterton Productions)
- Cinematography: Michel Brault - Mon oncle Antoine (NFB)
- Direction: Claude Jutra - Mon oncle Antoine (NFB)
- Film Editing: Douglas Robertson - Fortune and Men's Eyes (Cinemex/MGM)
- Sound Editing: not awarded
- Music Score: Jean Cousineau - Mon oncle Antoine (NFB)
- Original Screenplay: Clément Perron - Mon oncle Antoine (NFB)
- Overall Sound: Roger Lamoureux - Mon oncle Antoine (NFB)

=== Non-Feature Craft Awards ===
- Performance by a Lead Actor: Colin Fox - Durham and the Two Nations
- Performance by a Lead Actress: Carole Lazare - The Megantic Outlaw (CBC)
- Art Direction: Richard Lambert - The Magnificent Gift
- Black-and-White Cinematography: Ron Hallis and Henry Zemel - Toni, Randi and Marie
- Colour Cinematography: Bill Mason - Death of a Legend (NFB)
- Direction: Michael McKennirey - Atonement (NFB)
- Film Editing: John Sannen - Genetics: Man the Creator
- Sound Editing: Serge Beauchemin - Les Philharmonistes (NFB)
- Music Score: Larry Crosley - Seasons in the Mind (Milne-Pearson Productions)
- Screenplay: Don Arioli - Hot Stuff and Propaganda Message (NFB)
- Non-Dramatic Script: Claude Péloquin - L'Homme nouveau (NFB)
- Sound Recording: Dan Gibson - Solitudes - Sounds of Nature (Dan Gibson Productions)
- Sound Re-Recording: Film House - North of Superior (IMAX)

=== Special awards ===
- Multiscreen Corporation "for outstanding technical achievement with respect to the IMAX system".
- Clarke Mackey "for outstanding achievement in making his first feature film, The Only Thing You Know".
- John Drainie Award: Lister Sinclair "for outstanding contributions to broadcasting".
