= David Rothenberg (disambiguation) =

David Rothenberg may refer to:

- David Rothenberg, American professor of philosophy and music
- David Rothenberg (activist) (born 1933), American theatrical producer and prisoners' rights activist
- Dave Dave (1976–2018), American artist and burn victim, born David Rothenberg
