= 1971 in Canadian television =

The following is a list of events affecting Canadian television in 1971. Events listed include television show debuts, finales, cancellations, and channel launches.

== Events ==
Date	Event
February 22	Juno Awards of 1971.
July 30	Animation company Nelvana is founded. It specializes in making cartoons in film and TV for both children and adults.
September 12	TVA goes on the air with 3 affiliates.
October 1	23rd Canadian Film Awards.

=== Debuts ===
Show	Station	Premiere Date
The Hilarious House of Frightenstein	CHCH-TV	unknown
This Is the Law	CBC Television	June 21
All About Faces	CTV	August 30
Anything You Can Do	CTV	September 13
Dr. Simon Locke	CTV	September 13
Alphabet Soup	CBC Television	October 5
Polka Dot Door	TVOntario	March 30

=== Ending this year ===
Show	Station	Cancelled
Adventures in Rainbow Country	CBC Television	March 28
The Hart and Lorne Terrific Hour	CBC Television	Unknown
Zut!	CBC Television	Unknown
The Trouble with Tracy	CTV	Unknown

=== Births ===
Date	Name	Notability
March 10	Jen Gould	Voice actress
March 24	Graham Abbey	Actor
July 19	Alan Marriott	Voice actor, writer, improv comedian/instructor

== Television shows ==
=== 1950s ===
- Country Canada (1954–2007)
- CBC News Magazine (1952–1981)
- Chez Hélène (1959–1973)
- Circle 8 Ranch (1955–1978)
- The Friendly Giant (1958–1985)
- Hockey Night in Canada (1952–present)
- The National (1954–present)
- Front Page Challenge (1957–1995)
- Wayne and Shuster Show (1958–1989)

=== 1960s ===
- Audubon Wildlife Theatre (1968–1974)
- CTV National News (1961–present)
- Elwood Glover's Luncheon Date (1963–1975)
- The Galloping Gourmet (1968–1972)
- Land and Sea (1964–present)
- Man Alive (1967–2000)
- Mr. Dressup (1967–1996)
- Music Hop (1962–1972)
- The Nature of Things (1960–present, scientific documentary series)
- The Pierre Berton Show (1962–1973)
- The Pig and Whistle (1967–1977)
- Question Period (1967–present, news program)
- Reach for the Top (1961–1985)
- Singalong Jubilee (1961–1974)
- Take 30 (1962–1983)
- Telescope (1963–1973)
- The Tommy Hunter Show (1965–1992)
- University of the Air (1966–1983)
- W-FIVE (1966–present, newsmagazine program)

=== 1970s ===
- Drop-In (1970-1974)
- Here Come the Seventies (1970-1973)
- This Land (1970–1982)

== TV movies ==
- The Megantic Outlaw

== Television stations ==
=== Debuts ===
Date	Market	Station	Channel	Affiliation	Notes/References
April 1	Timmins, Ontario	CKSO-TV-2	3	CTV	Originally a rebroadcaster of CKSO-TV in Sudbury until 1980.
October 17	Saskatoon, Saskatchewan	CBKST	11	CBC Television (O&O)	Semi-satellite of CBKT/Regina; Shut down July 31, 2012
Unknown	Edmonton, Alberta	Channel 10 CCTV	10 (cable-only)	Independent/Community channel	
Unknown	Yorkton, Saskatchewan	CICC-TV	10	CTV	

== See also ==
- 1971 in Canada
- List of Canadian films
