= Fortune Society =

Nonprofit supporting former prisoners

- Official logo
- Formation: 1967
- Type: Nonprofit
- Purpose: Prisoner's rights
- Location: New York City, United States
- Website: fortunesociety.org

The Fortune Society is a New York City-based non-profit organization that provides support to the formerly incarcerated. Some of the services offered include help with finding housing and jobs, adjusting to civilian life, and educational opportunities. It was founded by David Rothenberg in 1967 as a result of his experience at Riker's Island while researching for the play Fortune and Men's Eyes.

== History ==
John Herbert, the author of Fortune and Men's Eyes, had been incarcerated as an altercation had caused a mass roundup by police. The judge sentenced him to prison due to his ambiguous gender presentation. Inspired by the play and Herbert's experience at Rikers, Rothenberg channeled a passion for activism into a non-profit advocacy organization and called it the Fortune Society in honor of the play. By the time the play premiered in Canada, the Fortune Society had been created. Initially, the organization began as discussion forums at the Actor's Playhouse featuring a diverse set of participants including parole officers, elected officials, and the formerly incarcerated among others. Pat McGarry and Clarence Cooper, author of The Farm, agreed on an organization called the Fortune Society, from the play's title, which had been taken from a Shakespearian sonnet, "When in disgrace with fortune and men’s eyes, I all alone beweep my outcast state."

Rothenberg's office on West 46th Street in New York City became the de facto headquarters of the organization and the group began fundraising at Tuesday night discussions. In an effort to raise awareness, four men from the society went on The David Susskind Show. Clarence Cooper, Frank Sandiford, Eddie Morris, and Rob Freeley were panelists on the show, leveraging their social status and celebrity. Susskind informed the audience that the men were all part of a new organization and to connect to them at the Fortune Society at their office address.

The next day 250 former convicts were lined up outside Rothenberg's small theater office, anticipating an organization that could help them with employment and housing. Mel Rivers also came that day to see what the organization was all about, resulting in Rivers, Jackson, McGarry, and Cooper starting as the core of the Fortune Society.

Rothenberg began arranging for the formerly incarcerated to come to the Fortune Society to attend Broadway plays. He recruited his close friend and colleague Alvin Ailey to join the organization, and provide tickets for those the society was trying to help. Kenny Jackson joked that when you get out of prison in New York, “you get $40, a baloney sandwich, and two tickets to Alvin Ailey.”

=== Attica Prison riot ===
Around this time, the Attica Prison riot broke out. Rothenberg was included on the prisoners' shortlist for civilian observers. This prompted Arthur Eve's office to call on him and recruit him for that role. He was among the three dozen men called in to Attica as observers. The group unanimously agreed to send a smaller delegation to represent observers. The delegation included William Kunstler, Tom Wicker of The New York Times, congressman Herman Badillo and state senator John R. Dunne, who returned to New York to plead with Governor Nelson Rockefeller, only to find he had ordered troops to take over the prison. The takeover was violent and there were many casualties. After the dust settled, four prisoners' bodies remained unclaimed. The Fortune Society made arrangements for these men to receive proper funerals.

The Attica Prison riot raised awareness of the conditions prisoners faced during incarceration. These events spurred Rothenberg's many friends and colleagues to work with other theater professionals to host additional fundraising events. Notables including Arlene Francis, Melba Moore, Zoe Caldwell, and Christopher Reeve supported the organization and raised funds. In addition, Attica prison publicized the Fortune Society to its prisoner population.

Many volunteers offered to help after Attica, providing tutoring and secretarial services. The model tutoring program that still runs today was created at this time, offering classes for illiteracy, general educational development testing and college preparation, as well as career services. The society grew in office space and participants with the collaboration of educational institutions.

=== HIV/AIDS care ===
At the start of the AIDS epidemic, the society received letters from inmates with tales of men dying of strange diseases. Rothenberg sent literature from the Gay Men's Health Crisis to Deputy Commissioner Marty Horn, who said they could not allow literature with the word gay in it. After discussion with Gay Men's Health Crisis, the word was never spelled out and the wardens permitted the brochures to enter. Thus, the New York City Department of Corrections took its first step in recognizing the epidemic's effect on the inmate population.

A 2001 study described how the Fortune Society prepares HIV-positive people to leave incarceration and take care of their health upon release.

== Operations ==
The Fortune Society provides a series of counseling services and seeks to accept clients who want to participate. Attending the services, both with trained professionals and peer to peer activities, is essential to the program. Former employees include Sam Rivera.

In 2005 the organization's annual budget was $13-14 million. This budget supported 200 staff who provided services to 3000-3500 formerly incarcerated persons each year. The cost of service per client was $3,265.

A 2005 evaluation of the Fortune Society attempted to determine the efficacy of the programs. The study praised the work of the Fortune Society as being focused on its mission, but also noted that many of its clients later are arrested again. The study discussed various effects of rehabilitation programs and framed the Fortune Society as a net good.
