= David Rothenberg (activist) =

Broadway producer and prisoners' rights activist (born 1933)

- Born: August 19, 1933 (age 92)
- Occupations: Theatrical agent and producer, radio host, prisoners' rights activist
- Years active: 1960–2016
- Known for: Prisoners' rights activist, Broadway producer, Civil rights activist, radio host
- Notable work: Fortune in my Eyes, Fortune Society

David Rothenberg (born August 19, 1933) is an American Broadway producer and prisoners' rights activist. After reading the script for Fortune and Men's Eyes by former prisoner and playwright John Herbert, he was instrumental in producing the play for an off-Broadway production. Later, he was a civilian observer during the Attica Prison riot, which left a deep impression on him and spurred his lifelong activism for prisoner's rights. This inspired him to found the Fortune Society organization, which advocates for prisoner's rights and works with former inmates to aid them in adjusting to life after prison. Rothenberg is an agnostic and lives in the West Village in New York City.

== Early life ==
Rothenberg was born in Teaneck, New Jersey to parents Leo and Leonore Rothenberg. His parents were both born in New York City. He graduated in 1951 from Teaneck High School. His childhood dream was to pursue sportswriting. His parents were the first Jewish family in northern New Jersey, while one of his grandmothers converted to become a devout Christian Scientist. He attended the University of Denver, where he was part of the Freshman Honor Society. He later became campus president of Students for Democratic Action. His first political hero was Jackie Robinson. Building on his dream to pursue writing, he became the editorial page columnist for the undergraduate newspaper, Clarion. Eventually, Rothenberg became editor in chief in the student academic years '54 and '55, even though a petition was circulated alleging he was a communist, likely as a result of his participation in social and political protests. While at the paper, he exposed the rape of fraternity boys at the university by Francis Van Derbur, the father of former Miss Colorado and Miss America, Marilyn Van Derbur who exposed her father's sexual abuse decades later. This story was suppressed by Francis Van Derbur due to his high standing in the business community and his position on the Alumni Association at the university

== Broadway career ==
Rothenberg arrived in NYC in 1958 after release from the US Army. He was inspired to pursue acting after seeing Joseph Mankiewicz's dialogue in the movie All About Eve. Initially, he worked with ad agencies and book publishers as a typist to make ends meet while simultaneously sending out introduction letters to theatrical producers, agents, and press agents listed in the Manhattan directory. He also answered ads listed in the New York Times related to show business. Rothenberg was eventually hired by Bob Larken to cover interviews with actors, directors and producers by TV and radio stations. Through his press coverage of the hit musical Jamaica he met Alvin Ailey. Their acquaintance grew into a friendship and through it Rothenberg was invited to various rehearsals that helped him grow his professional network. As a result, he attained a theatrical apprenticeship with the help of Bob Ullman, who sponsored him for it with ATPAM and arranged a summer job for him as a press rep. Rothenberg spent the summer of 1960 at Lakewood Theatre in Skowhega, Maine. The theatre saw the likes of Joan Fontaine, Shirley Booth and Henry Morgan perform there and gave Rothenberg great access and networking opportunities. In 1962, David Rothenberg joined Alex Cohen's office, continuing as a press rep. This position allowed him access to the pantheon of American theatre. Through his work he met and befriended titans of American theatre such as John Gielgud, Richard Burton, Alfred Drake, Charles Boyer, Ralph Richardson, and Elizabeth Taylor. Rothenberg was Taylor's date to the opening of Hamlet on Broadway, for which he did press. His first Broadway production was Beyond the Fringe, which emerged to be one of the biggest hits of the decade. It ran for years and many of the cast went on to have distinguished careers. Notably, the production opened at the Golden Theatre on the first day of the Cuban Missile Crisis. Following his success, Rothenberg began representing plays by Pulitzer Prize winning playwrights Edward Albee, Tennessee Williams and England's Harold Pinter, as well as more than 200 Broadway shows over the course of his career. In 1966 Rothenberg was invited by Jordan Charney and Nancy Cooperstein to workshop Megan Terry's Viet Rock, which gave him the opportunity to participate in escalating antiwar protests. Viet Rock was staged at the Sheridan Square Playhouse. By the time Viet Rock opened in New York, Rothenberg had already begun working with Fortune and Men's Eyes, his second standalone production.

His friend and drama critic at the Toronto Star, Nathan Cohen, informed Rothenberg of the play, which needed New York before it could make it in Toronto. After his first reading, he drafted a letter to the playwright, stating, "I felt that I was locked in a room of four cobras."

Rothenberg took out a loan to finance the play and it opened in February 1967 at the Actor's Playhouse in Greenwich Village. Four of the young actors in the play were Terry Kiser, Vic Arnold, Bob Christian, and Bill Moore. Holy Face starred as well.

As part of his research for the play, Rothenberg visited Rikers Island prison in New York, which was his first trip to such an institution. When inmates were in the dayroom, each of the visitors was placed in a cell and locked for a few minutes.

Critical reception was initially mixed with the New York Times critic Dan Sullivan being dismissive and unmoved by it. Dance critic Clive Barnes thought it exciting and three years later raved about the play's revival after becoming a theatre reviewer for the New York Times. Norman Nadel of New York World joined the Telegram and the Sun reviewers in criticizing the play. In contrast, Jerry Tallnem from the New York Post compared it to The Bicycle Thief and Marat/Sade. Michael Smith from the Village Voice raved about it, contributing to its 13-month initial run. Eventually, the play was the most successful drama in Canadian history, even playing internationally in more than 40 countries, including Turkey.

== Fortune Society and activism ==
Rothenberg disclosed his sexual orientation on national television as the leader of The Fortune Society in 1973.

John Herbert, the author of Fortune and Men's Eyes, had been incarcerated previously after an altercation by some thugs had caused a mass roundup by police. The judge sentenced him to prison due to his epicene appearance. Being deeply moved by the play, his experience at Rikers, and Herbert's plight, Rothenberg channeled his passion for activism into a non-profit advocacy organization called Fortune Society, borrowing from the play's own name. By the time the play premiered in Canada, the Fortune Society had been created. Initially, the organization began as discussion forums at the Actor's Playhouse featuring a diverse set of interlocutors including parole officers, elected officials, and the formerly incarcerated, among others. Pat McGarry and Clarence Cooper, author of The Farm, agreed on an organization called the Fortune Society, from the play's title, which had been taken from a Shakespearian sonnet, "When in disgrace with fortune and men's eyes, I all alone beweep my outcast state".

Rothenberg's office on West 46th Street became the de facto headquarters of the organization, and the group began fundraising at Tuesday night discussions. In an effort to raise awareness, four men from the society went on The David Susskind Show. Clarence Cooper, Frank Sandiford, Eddie Morris, and Rob Freeley were panelists on the show, leveraging their social status and celebrity. Susskind informed the audience that the men were all part of a new organization, and urged them to connect with them at the Fortune Society at their office address.

The next day two hundred fifty former convicts were lined up outside Rothenberg's small theater office, anticipating an organization that could help them with employment and housing. Mel Rivers also came that day to see what the organization was all about, resulting in Rivers, Jackson, McGarry, and Cooper starting as the core of Fortune Society.

Rothenberg began arranging for ex-cons coming to the Fortune Society to attend Broadway plays, and conscripted his close friend and colleague Alvin Ailey to join the organization and provide tickets for the formerly incarcerated whom the society was trying to help. Kenny Jackson joked that when somebody gets out of prison in New York, "you get $40, a baloney sandwich, and two tickets to Alvin Ailey".

Around this time, the Attica Prison riot broke out, and Rothenberg was included on the prisoners' shortlist for civilian observers. This prompted Arthur Eve's office to call on him and recruit him for that role. He was among the three dozen men called in to Attica as observers. The group unanimously agreed to send a smaller delegation to represent observers. The delegation included William Kunstler, Tom Wicker of the New York Times, congressman Herman Badillo, and state senator John Dunne, who returned to New York to plead with governor Nelson Rockefeller, only to find he had ordered troops to take over the prison. The takeover was violent, and there were casualties. After the dust settled, four prisoners' bodies remained unclaimed. Fortune Society made arrangements for these men to receive proper funerals.

The Attica Prison riot raised a lot of awareness about the conditions prisoners faced during their incarceration. These events spurred Rothenberg's many friends and colleagues to work with other theater professionals to host fundraising events. Notables like Arlene Francis, Melba Moore, Zoe Caldwell, and Christopher Reeve supported the organization and fundraised for its cause. Even Attica prison publicized Fortune Society to its prisoner population.

Many volunteers offered to help after Attica, providing tutoring and secretarial services. The model tutoring program that still runs today was created at this time, offering classes for illiteracy, GED and college preparation, as well as career services. The society grew in office space and participants with the welcome collaboration of educational institutions

During the infancy of AIDS, the society received letters from inmates with tales of men dying of a strange epidemic. Rothenberg sent literature from the Gay Men's Health Crisis to Deputy Commissioner Marty Horn, who said they could not allow literature with the word gay in it. After discussion with Gay Men's Health Crisis, the word was never spelled out and the wardens permitted the brochures to enter. Thus, the Department of Corrections took its first step in recognizing the epidemic's effect on the inmate population.

== Political aspirations ==
Rothenberg ran for city councilman in 1985 in Manhattan to raise awareness about AIDS, which at the time was seen as a "gay epidemic." He ran as an openly gay candidate, which prompted significant media attention. He was profiled in the Sunday Daily News and in New York magazine. Dave Fleischer was recruited as his campaign manager and under his direction the campaign raised over $250,000, a record for the city council race. Rothenberg was widely endorsed, including by the Daily News, the Village Voice, and the Amsterdam News, among others. Rothenberg garnered 46% of the vote, collecting the third largest number of votes of any candidate in the city's 38 council race. Unfortunately, his opponent had the second greatest number of votes, thus winning the race.

== Bibliography ==
- Rothenberg, David (2012). Fortune in my eyes : a memoir of Broadway glamour, social justice, and political passion. New York: Applause Theatre Books. ISBN 978-1-557-83926-8.
