= Archibald McKillop =

Scottish-born Canadian poet and orator known as the Blind Bard of Megantic

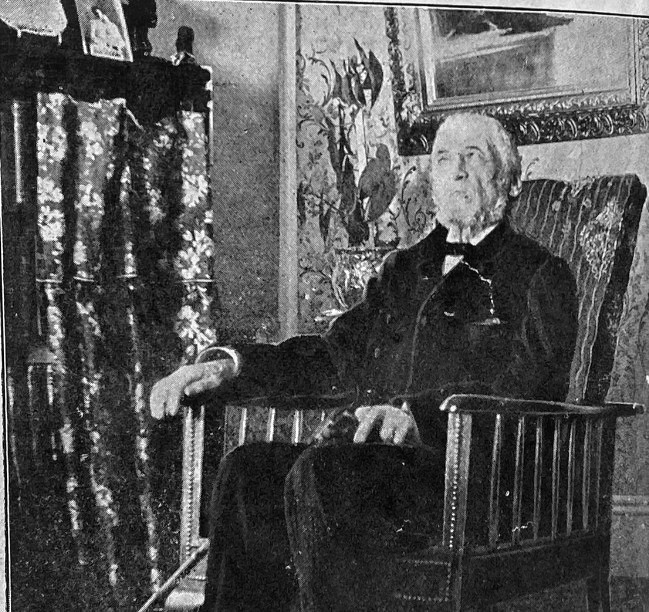
- Born: 1 August 1825; Lochranza, Isle of Arran, Scotland.
- Died: 26 September 1904 (aged 79); Kingston, Ontario
- Resting place: Congregational Church Cemetery, Inverness, Quebec; 46.22614°N 71.55387°W
- Education: University of Toronto
- Notable work: The malt that lay in the house that Jack built. To Royalty.
- Movement: Temperance movement

Archibald McKillop (1 August 1825 – 26 September 1904), commonly referred to as the Blind Bard of Megantic, was a Scottish-born Canadian poet and orator known for his contributions to the temperance cause and for his literary work celebrating Scottish heritage, Canadian landscapes, and civic values.

== Early life and education ==
McKillop was born on July 4, 1824 in Lochranza on the Isle of Arran, Scotland. In 1829, at the age of five, he emigrated to Lower Canada with a group of settlers from Arran led by his father, also named Archibald McKillop. The family settled in the Eastern Townships region, near Inverness, in what became known as the Arran settlement.

Archibald McKillop’s father played a prominent role in the early Inverness settlement. In 1837, he was appointed Commissioner for the Summary Trial of Small Causes in Inverness, Megantic County. Archibald McKillop’s father played a central role in leading the original 1829 Scottish settlement at Inverness in Lower Canada. In a letter dated October 1839, he described the hardships faced by settlers, particularly the lack of promised infrastructure like the Gosford Road, and the economic isolation this caused. He also expressed frustration over land allocation issues and the migration of younger settlers to the United States due to limited opportunities.

Raised on a farm in Inverness, McKillop showed early promise in writing. He received formal education in Lachine and later studied at the University of Toronto. His academic development was strongly encouraged by his father, who had attended the University of Edenborough and placed a high value on education.

== Loss of sight and public life ==
McKillop lost his sight gradually following an injury to one of his eyes sustained during a visit home for Christmas. Despite the disability, he became a respected public speaker and was especially active in the temperance movement. He gave many speeches throughout Canada and became well known for his moral convictions and his clear speaking style.

McKillop also took part in political and religious debates and was recognized for his strong and sometimes firm opinions. His writing often expressed loyalty to his Scottish roots, admiration for Canada, and a deep love for nature. He was closely involved with the Scottish Society of Canada, who considered him their Celtic bard.

== Literary contributions ==
His poems reflected themes like nature, religion, national pride, and temperance. One of his best known works, Thoughts on Megantic, Past, Present and Future, was read publicly in 1896 at a Temperance Society event in Inverness. The poem shows his emotional connection to the Megantic region and his continued support for social reform.

== Later life ==
In 1886, McKillop placed a newspaper ad offering a 200-acre farm for sale in Sainte-Julie de Somerset, describing it as fertile and well built, just two miles from the church. The ad reflects his role as a local landowner involved in agricultural affairs.

In 1890, McKillop visited Donald Morrison, the "Megantic outlaw," at the St. Vincent de Paul Penitentiary. The two conversed in Gaelic, and McKillop offered Morrison moral and spiritual encouragement, advising him to seek comfort in the Bible. The visit was marked by tension with prison officials, particularly the warden, whose treatment of McKillop was described in contemporary reports as brusque and dismissive.

== Legacy and death ==
In the 1970s, a collection of McKillop’s poetry titled Collected Verse: The Blind Bard of Megantic was published with the support of his nephew, Neil McKillop. The book includes several poems celebrating Megantic County, as well as works reflecting his strong support for temperance and loyalty to the Crown.

One poem, The Drunken Bear, offers a humorous take on the dangers of alcohol, using rural storytelling and rhyme to make its point. The collection helped renew interest in McKillop’s work among descendants of Eastern Townships settlers across Canada.

McKillop died in Kingston Ontario in 1904 at the home of his nephew, Donald McKillop Solandt. He was buried in the Congregationalist Cemetery near Inverness, close to his father. Today he is remembered as a notable figure of the Scottish Canadian settler experience and as a rare example of a blind poet living and writing in rural 19th century Canada.

== Selected works ==
Malt that lay in the house that Jack built. The flood of death, or, The malt that lay in the house that Jack built - 1875.

One of McKillop’s notable royal-themed poems, To Royalty, was written in 1878 to mark the arrival in Canada of Princess Louise, daughter of Queen Victoria, and her husband John Campbell, the Marquess of Lorne. The poem was composed in Inverness, Quebec, and reflects McKillop’s loyalty to the Crown and his skill in capturing natural and national sentiments in verse.

To Royalty

When the woodlands wide had laid aside

Their mantle of green and gold;

When the songsters sang their sweetest lays

Ere they fled before the cold.

When the great old leafless maples stood

Where the floods and fountains freeze;

When the evergreens in their rich attire

Held forth to the bracing breeze,

’Twas then we raised our hearts to Him

Whose blessings are rich and free;

When the nation's anxious, longing look

Was turned to the sounding sea.

Then a sudden burst, like an echo, fell

Upon every listening ear,

And a thousand ringing wires proclaimed

The great “Sarmartion” near.

They have safely come, the noblest pair

That ever crossed the tide,—

The Marquis of Lorne, a Royal Scot,

With a Royal English bride.

—Inverness, 1878

The poem was reprinted in Thetford Thoughts in 1957 to coincide with the Canadian visit of Queen Elizabeth II and Prince Philip, highlighting the enduring relevance of McKillop’s writing in royal commemorations.

== See also ==
- Eastern townships
- English-speaking Quebecers
- List of Canadian poets
- Prohibition in Canada
- Scots-Quebecers
- The Commonwealth
