= Donald Morrison (outlaw) =

Canadian outlaw

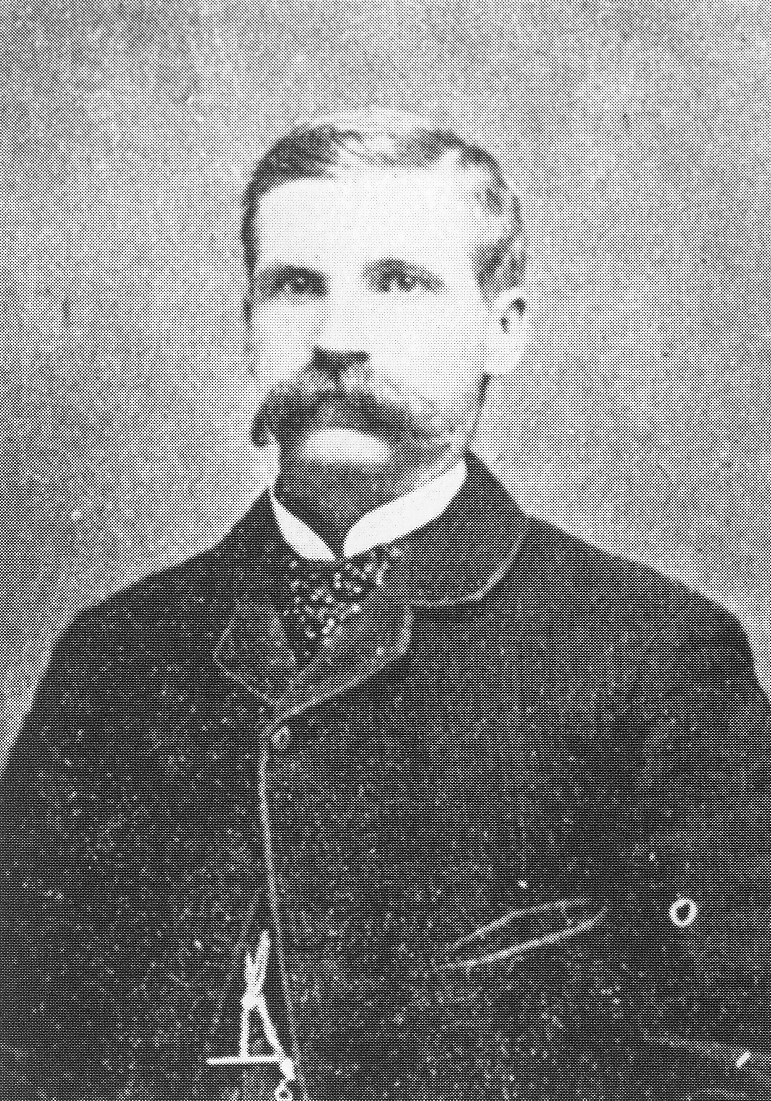
- Donald Morrison, before 1892.
- Born: March 15, 1858
- Died: June 19, 1894 (aged 36); Montreal
- Resting place: The Gisla Cemetery, Milan, Quebec; 45.6337°N 71.1452°W
- Conviction: Manslaughter
- Criminal charges: Murder
- Penalty: Hard labour, 18 years
- Time at large: 10 months

Details
- Location: Lac-Mégantic, Quebec
- Killed: 1
- Date apprehended: 21 April 1889

Donald Morrison (15 March 1858 – 19 June 1894) was a Canadian outlaw, convicted of manslaughter, who became a folk hero.

== Early life ==
Morrison was the son of Scottish immigrants to Canada from the Isle of Lewis. He was born in the Canadian Gaelic-speaking immigrant community near Lac-Mégantic in Canada East. At the age of 20, Morrison moved to Western Canada and the United States where he learned the cowboy trade, and became skilled both with guns and horses. The money he earned was sent home to help pay for the family farm.

== Criminal activity ==
A newspaper article from 1889 details the complicated dispute that led to Morrison’s downfall. His father, Murdo Morrison, had mortgaged the family farm to Malcolm MacAulay, who allegedly exploited Murdo’s illiteracy by substituting a higher debt obligation than intended. When repayment failed, the land was seized and sold to a buyer named Duquette. Donald Morrison refused to accept settlement terms that would have left the mortgage in place and contested the transaction in court, but he ultimately lost. Duquette’s barn and later his house were burned, and Morrison was openly suspected of the arson. He is also reported to have threatened Duquette directly, warning him to abandon the property.

An unsavory American special constable and whiskey smuggler named Lucius F. Warren was called in to capture Morrison, bragging that he could outshoot him; he paid with his life on 22 June 1888, while attempting to apprehend Morrison. Morrison drew his revolver and fatally shot Warren, severing the constable’s carotid artery. The killing confirmed Morrison’s reputation as an outlaw and prompted the government to intensify efforts to capture him.

The longest manhunt in Canadian history then followed. In October 1888, Quebec’s Attorney General Arthur Turcotte issued a proclamation offering a reward of $1,200 for Morrison’s capture. The document, signed by Lieutenant Governor Auguste-Réal Angers, formally declared Morrison responsible for the shooting death of constable Lucius F. Warren and called on the public to aid in his arrest.

In February 1889, Quebec’s Attorney General Arthur Turcotte issued another proclamation increasing the reward to $3,000 (roughly $CAD 100,000 in 2025) for Morrison’s capture.

Morrison was hunted in the wilds of Lac-Mégantic from June 1888 until April 1889; for 10 months he evaded lawmen. He was captured on 21 April 1889, he fired a shot at the arresting officers. Much of the time he was hidden by sympathetic supporters in the Scotstown community. At times he passed by detectives with such cool reserve that they did not suspect him, unwittingly having him inches within their grasp.

== Capture, prison, & death ==
A truce was finally arranged, but Morrison was ambushed and shot. He was arrested and tried in Sherbrooke, Quebec, and although he had acted in self-defense, was convicted of manslaughter and sentenced to 18 years hard labour. He was sent to Bordeaux Prison, his mustache shaved off, and he was given the roll number 2329.

In 1890, while imprisoned at the St. Vincent de Paul Penitentiary, Morrison was visited by Archibald McKillop, the Blind Bard of Megantic, who offered him spiritual counsel and left him a book.

In April 1890, Morrison was described as haggard and melancholy, suffering from pain in his wounded leg, poor health, and a sense of hopelessness. Prison officials noted he had once nearly lost his sanity but was stabilized with the help of the prison chaplain and deputy warden.

In May 1894, Morrison decides to commit suicide through starvation. There is a petition for his release from prison, which is signed by the Justice Minister on 16 June 1894. He contracted "consumption", an outdated term for tuberculosis. He died at 4pm on 19 June 1894 at Royal Victoria Hospital, Montreal on the same day after being released from prison (pardoned on clemency).

Morrison is buried in The Gisla Cemetery in present-day Milan, QC.

== Legacy ==
A yearly festival is held in the Donald Morrison domaine to commemorate Donald Morrison and the Scottish Gaelic-speaking pioneers of the Megantic area. His story was romanticized in poem-form in the book The Canadian Outlaw (1892) by Oscar Dhu (Angus Mackay), Donald Morrison 'The Megantic Outlaw' (1948) by Henry G. Kidd, Ron Kelly's 1971 television film The Megantic Outlaw, and in The Outlaw of Megantic (1973) by Bernard Epps. His life is the subject of a Gaelic-language concept album The Megantic Outlaw (2007) by Calum Martin. The 78th Fraser Highlanders Pipe Band has issued a CD entitled, "The Megantic Outlaw Concert." A Gaelic novel by Calum MacLeòid was published in 2020: "Fon Choill."

In 2016, the municipality of Milan opened The Donald Morrison Interpretation Center at 891 chemin Gisla, about 4 kilometers from The Gisla Cemetery on the same road. The Interpretation Center houses artifacts from Donald Morrison himself and his family. The Interpretation Center is open only on Saturdays from June to September.

== Gallery ==
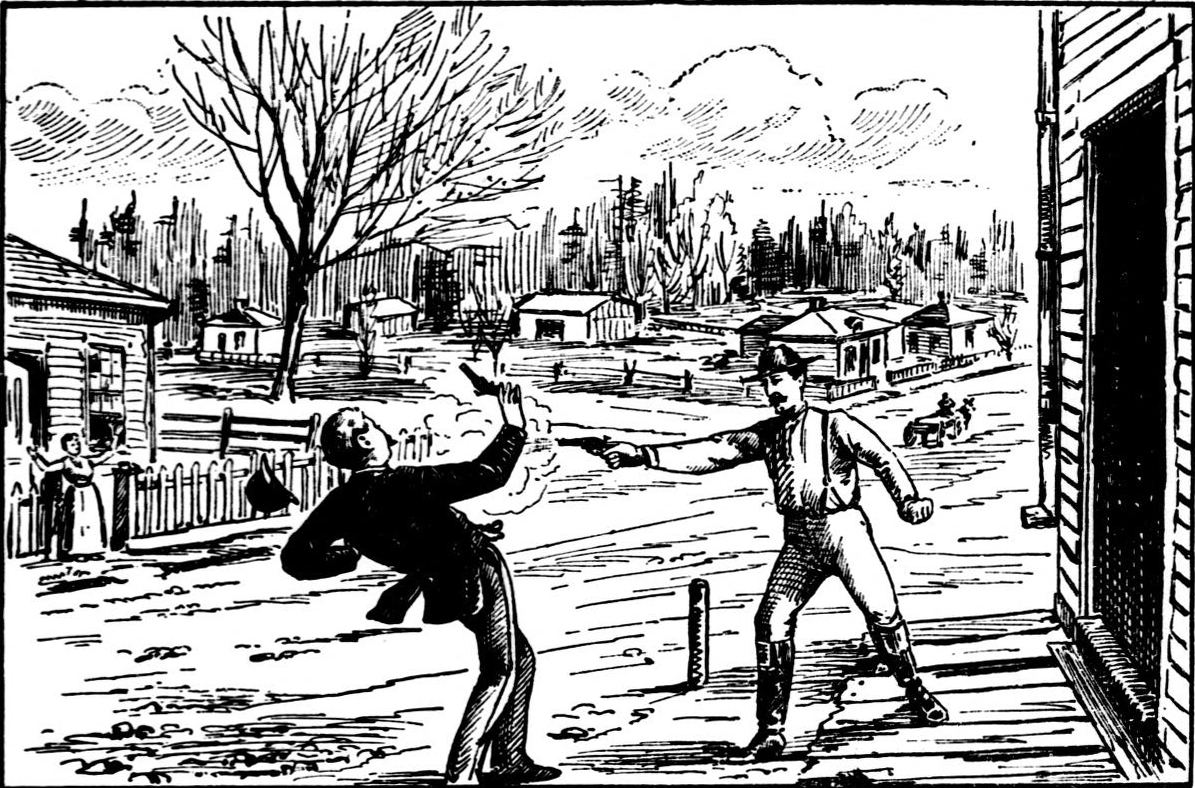
Morrison killing special constable Warren.

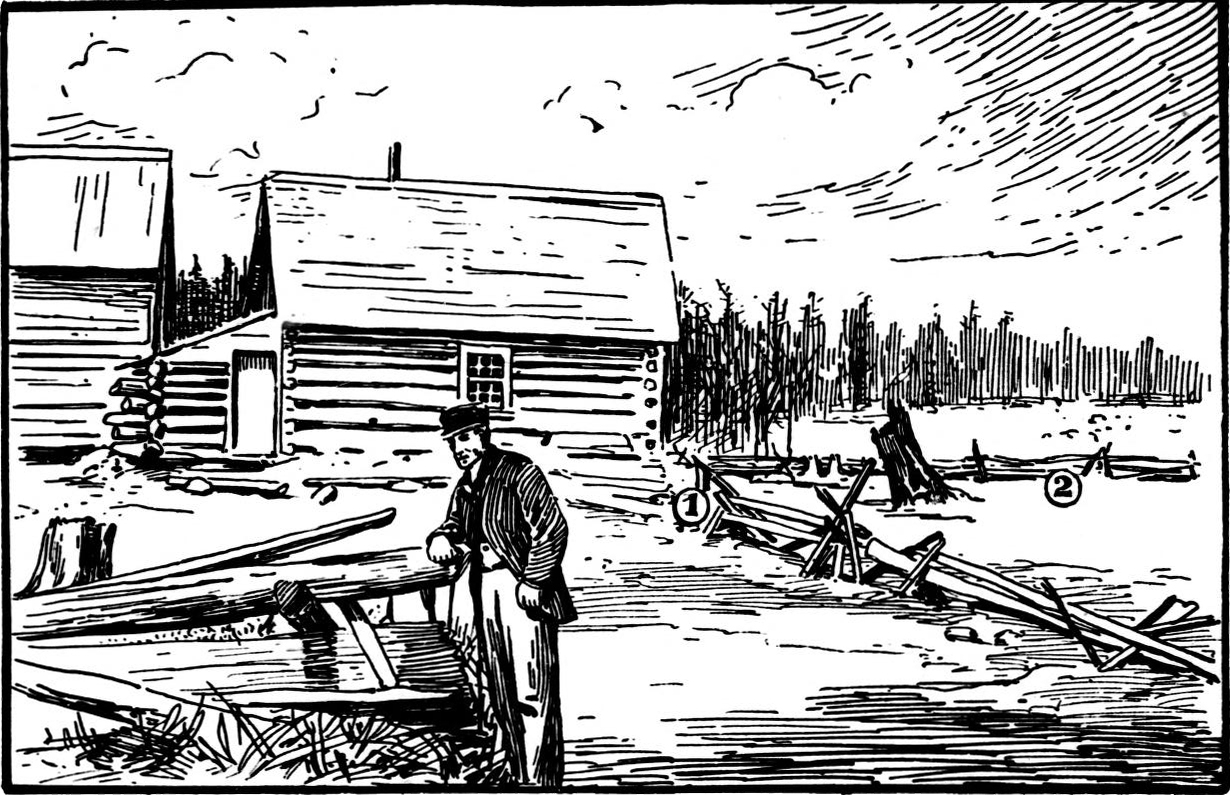
Scene of Morrison's capture.

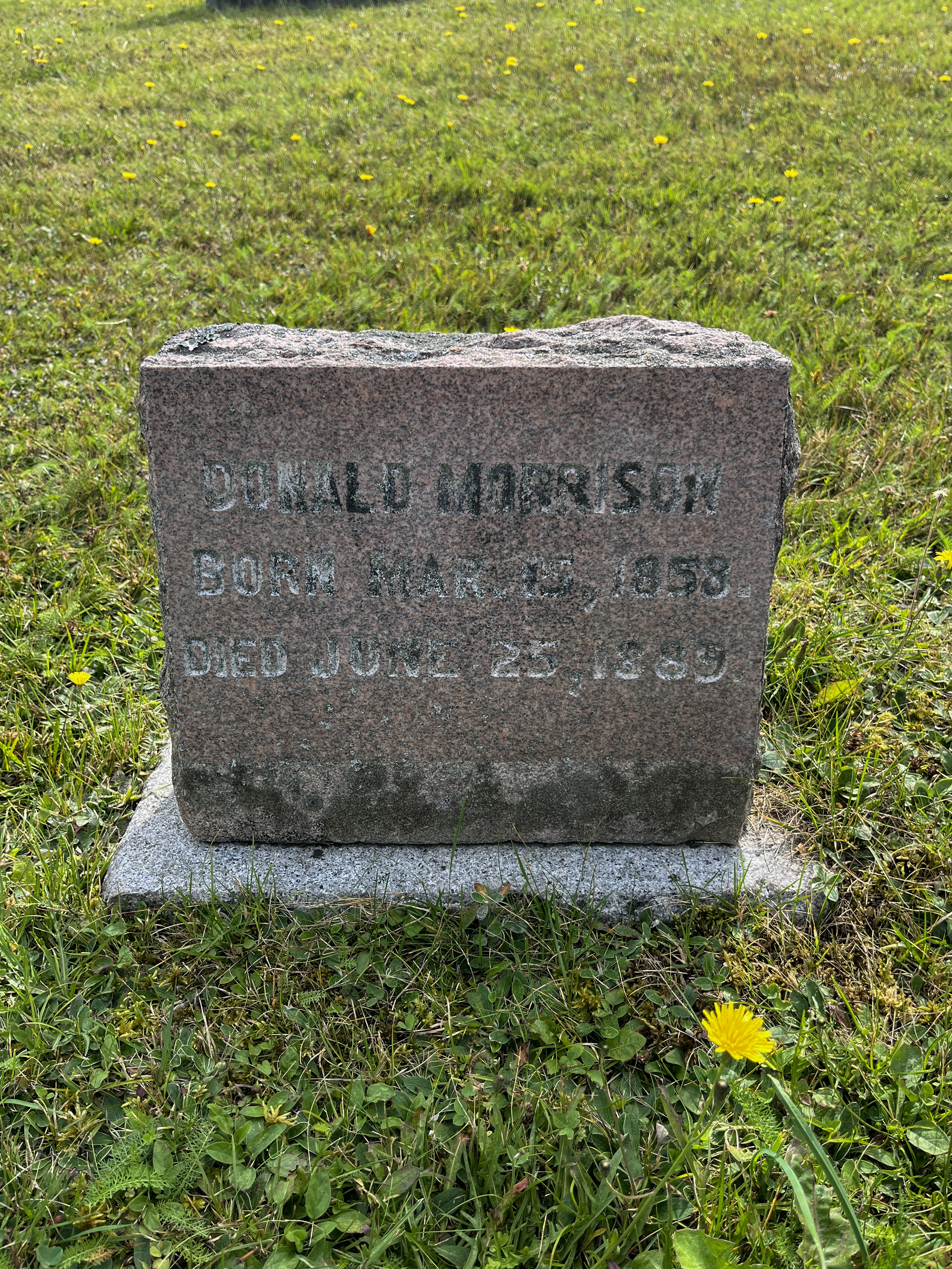
The original headstone of Donald Morrison. Incorrectly states death date as June 25.

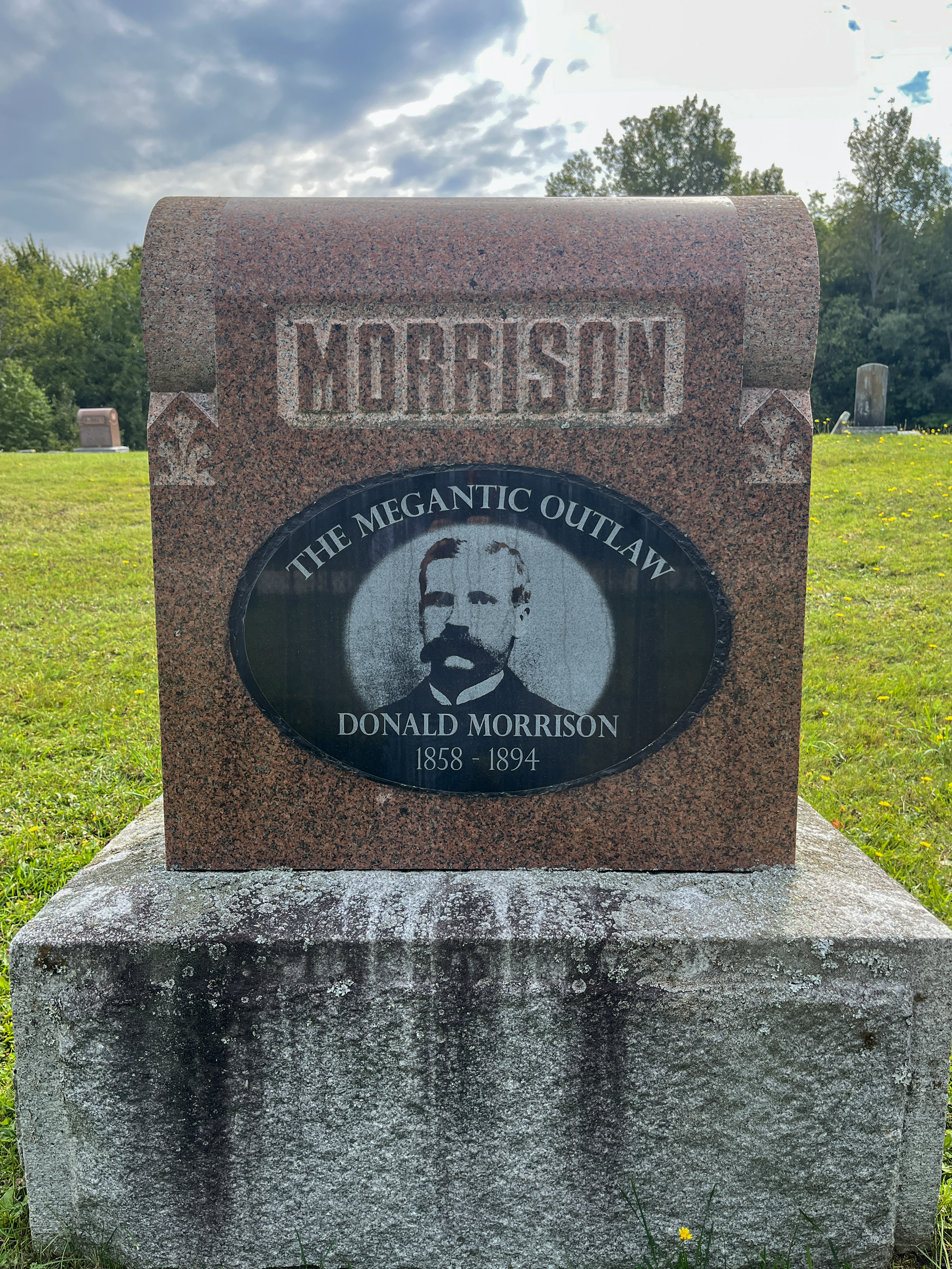
Morrison family tombstone.

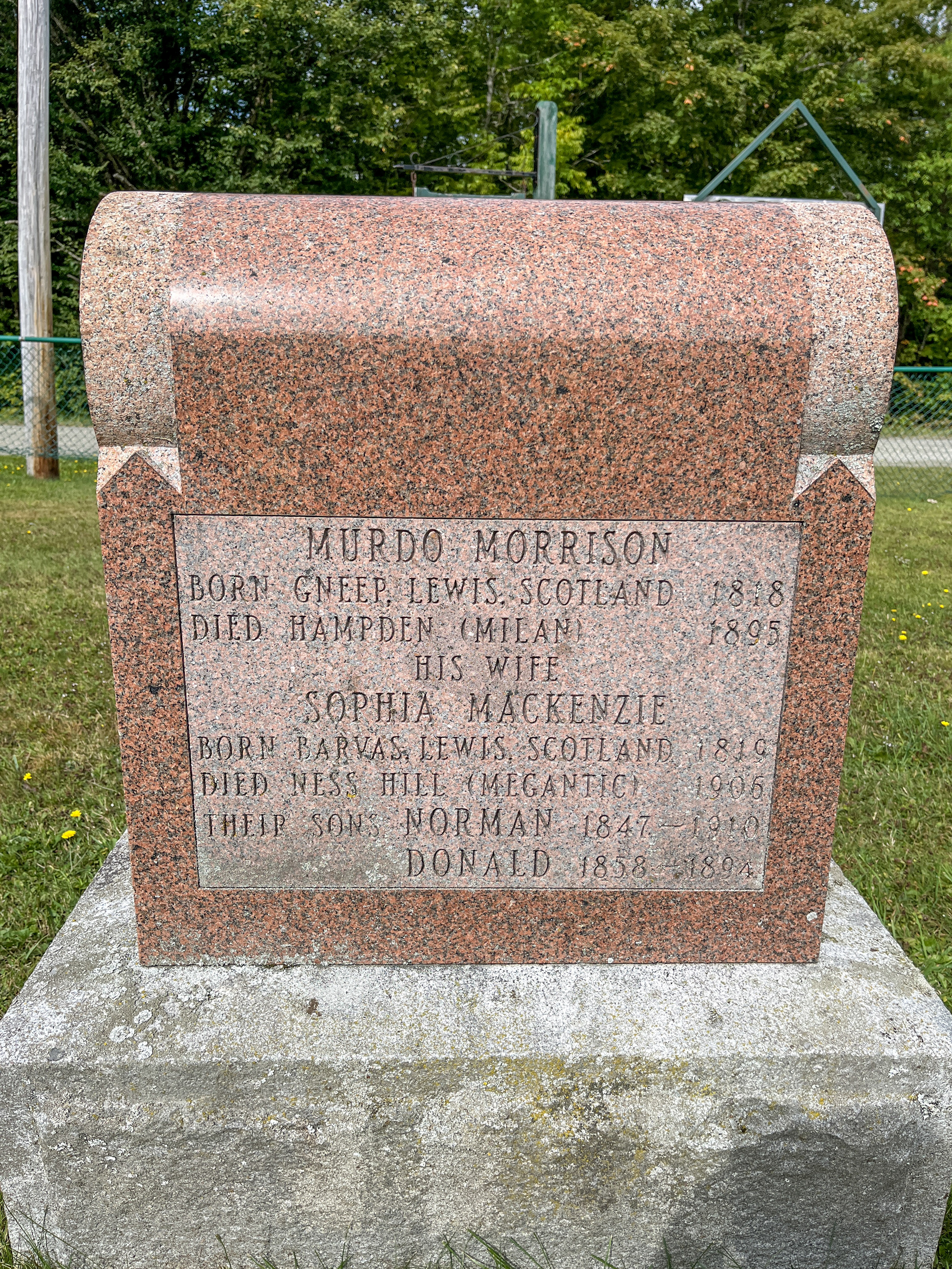
The back of the Morrison family tombstone.

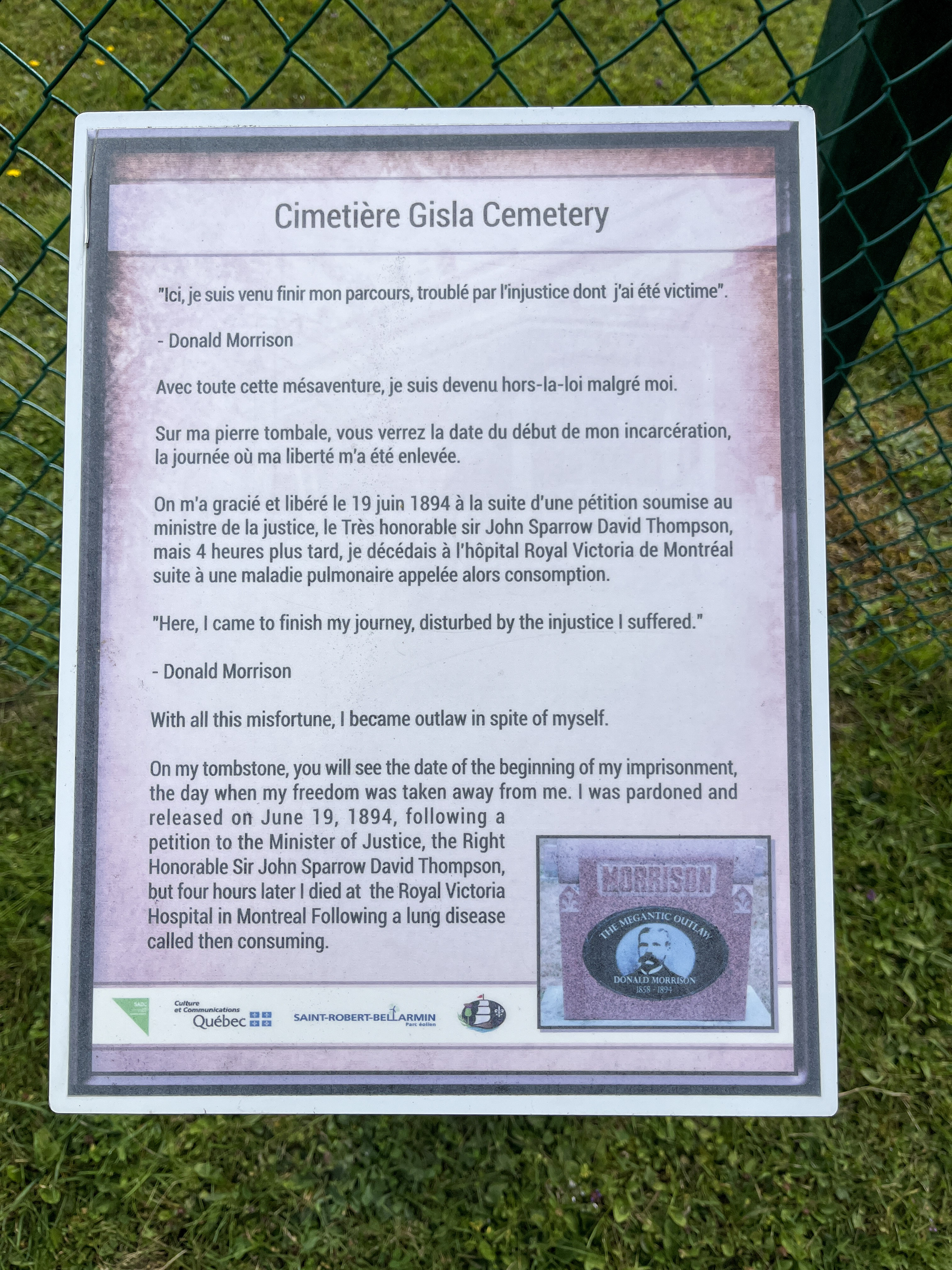
Sign at the Gisla Cemetery.

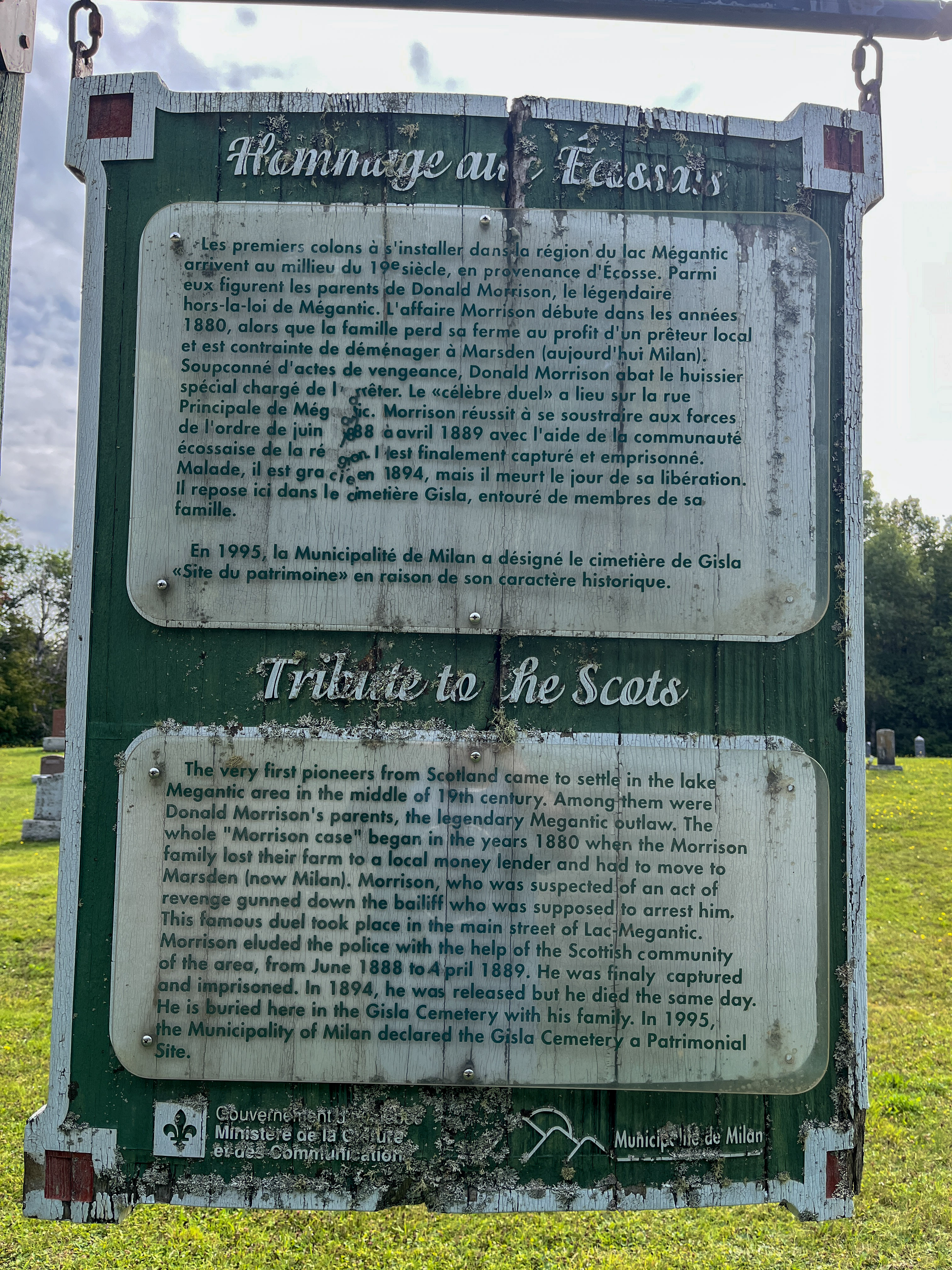
"Tribute to the Scots" at the Gisla Cemetery.

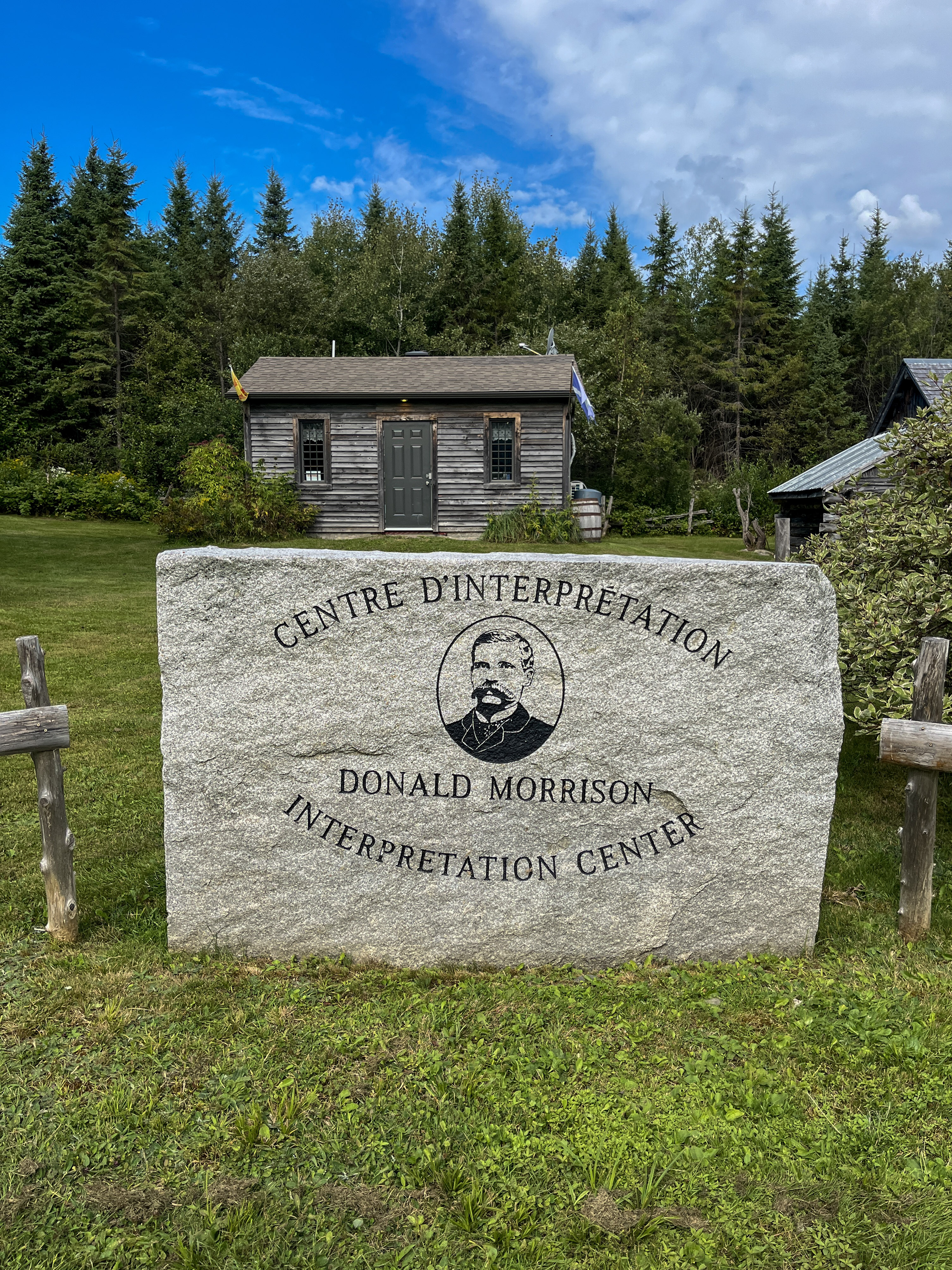
Donald Morrison Interpretation Center.

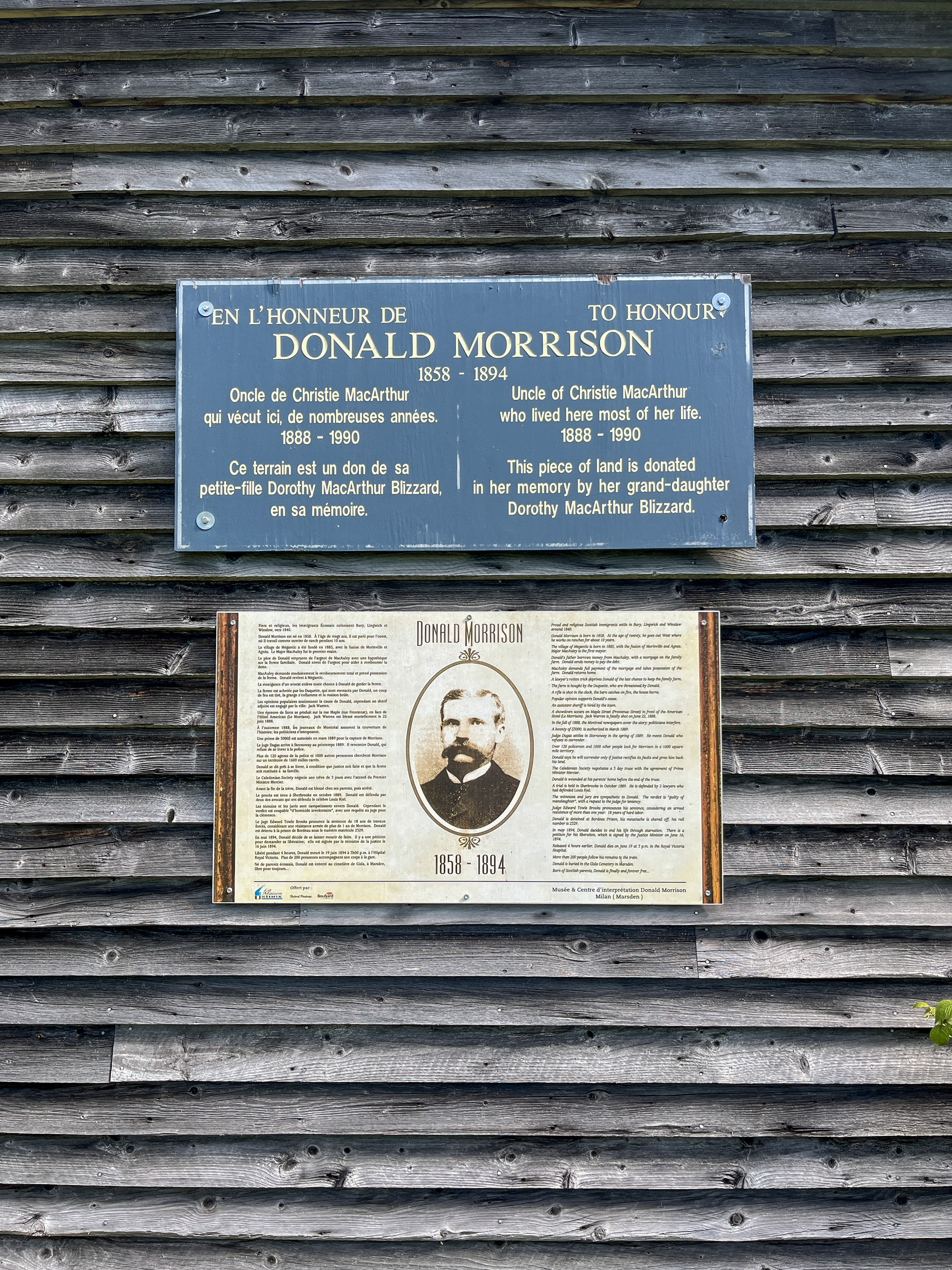
Dedication sign at the Interpretation Center.

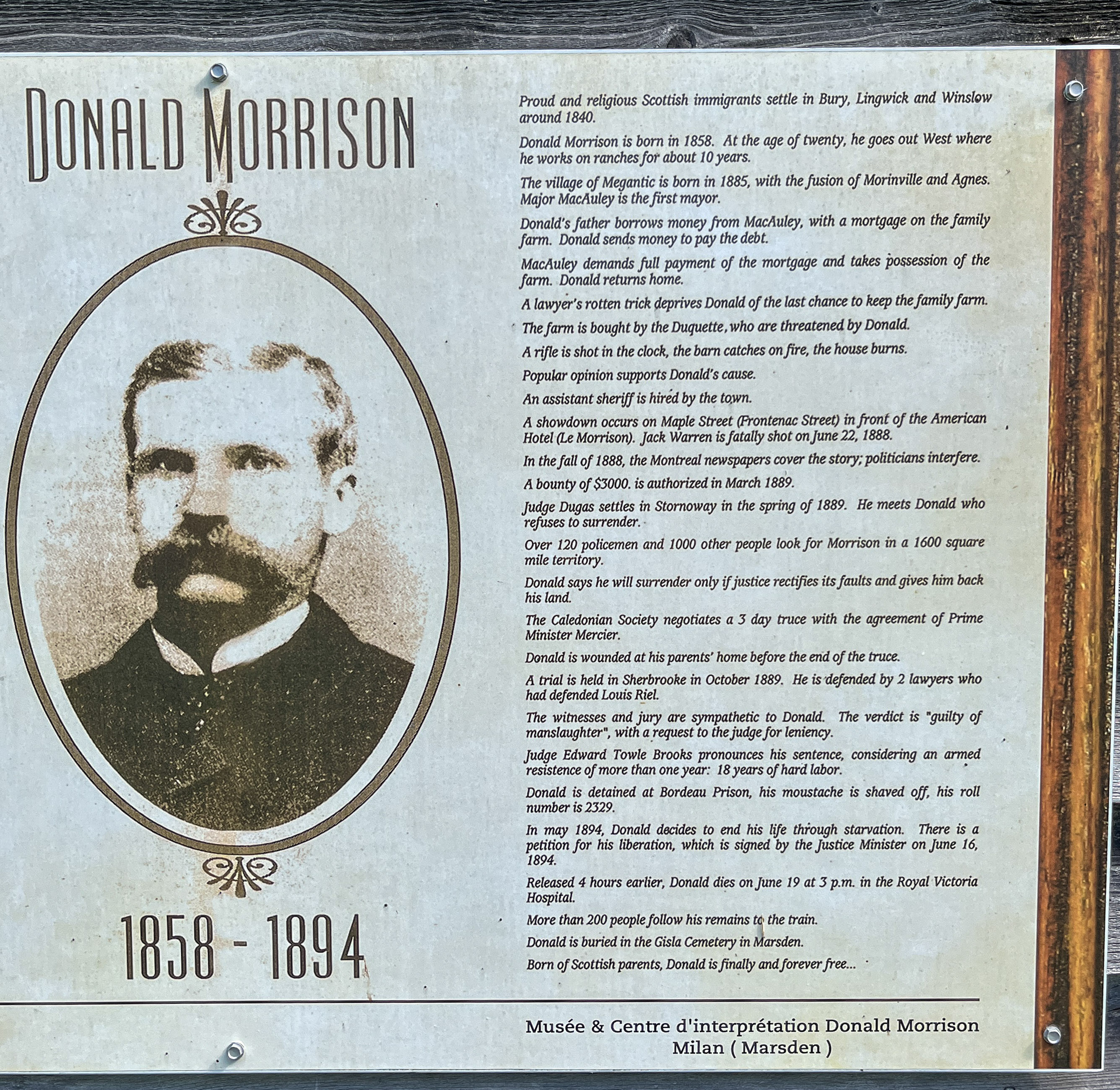
Zoomed-in version of dedication sign.

== See also ==
- Eastern townships
- English-speaking Quebecers
- Scots-Quebecers
- The Commonwealth
