= Aleksandr Kuznetsov (designer) =

Russian production designer and art director

Aleksandr Kuznetsov (March 31, 1930 - March 1, 1998) was a Russian production designer and art director in film, most noted for his work on the 1966 film Aybolit-66.

After Canadian filmmaker Gerald Potterton recontextualized the original film into the live action-animation hybrid film Tiki Tiki, Kuznetsov was named the winner of the Canadian Film Award for Best Art Direction/Production Design at the 23rd Canadian Film Awards in 1971.
