= Aybolit-66 =

- Directed by: Rolan Bykov
- Written by: Rolan Bykov; Vadim Korostylyov; Kornei Chukovsky (story)
- Cinematography: Gennadi Tsekavyj; Viktor Yakushev
- Edited by: Irma Tsekavaya
- Music by: Boris Tchaikovsky
- Production company: Mosfilm
- Release date: 19 April 1967
- Running time: 92 minutes
- Country: Soviet Union
- Language: Russian

Aybolit-66 (Russian: Айболит-66) is a 1967 Soviet family comedy film directed by Rolan Bykov. It is based on a story by Kornei Chukovsky. The film features Oleg Yefremov as the good Aibolit and Rolan Bykov as the evil Barmalei.

== Plot ==
In Africa, an epidemic of various diseases breaks out, affecting all the monkeys. This news is brought to Doctor Aybolit by Chichi the monkey, who has escaped from the bandit Barmaley.

Aybolit, along with his assistants—Chichi and Avva the dog—sets off for Africa to save the monkeys. However, their journey is hindered by Barmaley and his two bandit accomplices. First, they seize Aybolit’s ship at sea, throwing him, Avva, and Chichi overboard along with their medicines. The trio manages to reach the African shore on an improvised raft.

Once on land, the bandits capture the group again and imprison them in a cave, planning to deal with them later. Deceived by Barmaley, Chichi almost jumps into a fire out of despair, but Aybolit persuades her otherwise. The bandits untie Aybolit, demanding he hand over all his medicines so they can be immune to illness forever. While freeing his friends, Aybolit refuses to give Barmaley the "best medicine." The bandits forcibly take the medicine and drink it, but it causes severe stomach pain. Taking advantage of the chaos, Aybolit and his friends escape.

In the finale, Barmaley orders his henchmen to gather all the local pirates by the riverbank, where they tie Aybolit and his companions to an old boat. In a mockery of Aybolit, Barmaley dons the doctor’s outfit and parodies him in front of the pirates. However, the pirates misunderstand the joke and tie Barmaley to the boat as well.

The Tragedians and Comedians from Mosfilm intervene, battling the pirates and rescuing Aybolit, Chichi, and Avva. The trio resumes their mission to heal the monkeys. Though Barmaley attempts to thwart them one last time, he arrives too late—the monkeys are already cured.

== Cast ==
- Oleg Yefremov as Doctor Aybolit
- Lidiya Knyazeva as Chi-Chi the Monkey
- Yevgeni Vasilyev as Avva the Dog
- Rolan Bykov as Barmalei / Author
- Aleksei Smirnov as Jolly pirate
- Frunzik Mkrtchyan as Sad pirate
- Leonid Yengibarov as cheerful clown #1
- Konstantin Khudyakov as pirate
- Igor Yasulovich as white clown
- Ilya Rutberg as orchestra conductor
- Vadim Grachyov as cheerful clown #2
- Gurgen Janibekyan as old pirate

== Influence ==
In 1971, Canadian filmmaker Gerald Potterton released the film Tiki Tiki, which intercut footage from Aybolit-66 with original animated sequences to recontextualize it in the style of Woody Allen's 1966 film What's Up, Tiger Lily?. Aleksandr Kuznetsov, the original production designer of Aybolit-66, was named the winner of the Canadian Film Award for Best Art Direction/Production Design at the 23rd Canadian Film Awards.
