= The Gay Deceivers =

1969 American comedy film

- Original release poster
- Directed by: Bruce Kessler
- Written by: Jerome Wish
- Story by: Gil Lasky; Abe Polsky
- Produced by: Joe Solomon
- Starring: Kevin Coughlin; Brooke Bundy; Lawrence P. Casey; Jo Ann Harris; Michael Greer
- Cinematography: Richard C. Glouner
- Edited by: Reg Browne; Renn Reynolds
- Music by: Stu Phillips
- Production company: Fanfare Films Inc.
- Distributed by: American International Pictures
- Release date: July 2, 1969
- Running time: 97 minutes
- Country: United States
- Language: English
- Budget: $400,000

The Gay Deceivers is a 1969 American comedy film written by Jerome Wish and directed by Bruce Kessler. The film stars Kevin Coughlin, Lawrence P. Casey, Brooke Bundy, Jo Ann Harris and Michael Greer.

The film opened in Atlanta and San Francisco on July 2, 1969. The film received mixed reviews, and was subject to a protest when it was shown in San Francisco.

== Plot ==
Danny and Elliot are two friends who try to get out of the draft by pretending to be gay. They are placed under surveillance by the Army and have to keep up the pretense. They move into a gay apartment building and try to blend in with the residents, all the while trying to maintain their romantic relationships with women and not get caught by the Army.

At the apartment building they meet their landlord Malcolm and his husband Craig. Throughout the story, Malcolm and Craig attempt to give advice to Danny and Elliot as they remember when they were a young couple. At first Danny and Elliot dismiss Malcolm and Craig as "two fruits" and try to play along to keep up their ruse. But they begin to see Malcolm and Craig as good people and question what they were taught about homosexuals.

Tension rises between Danny and Elliot as Danny insists Elliot cannot have any relations with women for the duration of their ruse, while he himself keeps going on dates with his girlfriend Karen. After having a fight with Danny, Elliot knowingly enters a gay bar and allows a man to buy him drinks and flirt with him. After the man attempts to get sexual, Elliot punches the man and then leaves in a confused rage, not sure what he is feeling.

Karen breaks up with Danny, believing him and Elliot to be a couple. Trying to prove her brother is not gay, Danny's sister Leslie seduces Elliot, but he suffers erectile dysfunction further confirming the girls' suspicions. Later at a gay party hosted by Malcolm and Craig, Elliot attempts to sleep with a drag queen before being discovered by the Army investigator who was following him.

Even after the pair are caught, they are not inducted into the military: the Army investigators assigned to watch them are themselves gay and are trying to keep straight people out of the Army.

== Cast ==
- Kevin Coughlin - Danny Devlin
- Brooke Bundy - Karen
- Larry Casey - Elliot Crane
- Jo Ann Harris - Leslie Devlin
- Michael Greer - Malcolm
- Sebastian Brook - Craig
- Jack Starrett - Colonel Dixon
- Richard Webb - Mr. Devlin
- Eloise Hardt - Mrs. Devlin
- Jeanne Baird - Mrs. Conway
- Michael Kopcha - Psychiatrist
- Joe Tornatore - Sergeant Kravits
- Robert Reese - Real Estate Agent
- Christopher Riordan - Duane
- Douglas Hume - Corporal
- David Osterhout - Stern
- Marilyn Wirt - Sybil
- Ron Gans - Freddie
- Rachel Romen - Dorothy
- Tom Grubbs - Paul
- Louise Williams - Bunny
- Randee Lynne Jensen - Sheryl
- Meridith Williams - Phil
- Harry Sodoni - Georgette
- Leonore Stevens - Laverne
- Trigg Kelly - Jacki
- Tony Epper - Vince
- Anthony De Longis
- Candice Rialson

== Background and production ==
In 1968, Fanfare Film acquired the original story from Gil Lasky and Abe Polsky. They were initially given the assignment to write the screenplay, but that job ended up going to Jerome Wish. Principal photography began on the film on March 3, 1969. Film historian Vito Russo noted that Michael Greer not only wrote his own role, he also rewrote the screenplay in places, making it "funnier and less homophobic than was intended". Greer's role as the "nelly landlord" was so popular with film critics, that after its first week in theaters, the film's distributor changed the ad campaign, billing him as the star of the movie. Larry Casey later complained that even though he was married with children, he had trouble finding work after the movie, due to his having appeared in "a homosexual picture." The film was also the debut of Candice Rialson as the "Girl In Bikini".

== Release and home media ==
The film was originally scheduled for general release on June 25, 1969, but it was moved to July 2, 1969, opening in Atlanta and San Francisco. It then opened on July 16 in Los Angeles, and on July 30 in New York City. Variety Magazine listed the film among the top fifty highest-grossing releases between July 30, 1969, and December 17, 1969.

The film was initially banned in Australia due to depictions of homosexuality. It was not until censorship laws were reformed in November 1971, that the movie was allowed to be shown with a R rating. The film had its cable premiere on Turner Classic Movies in 2002. It was released on DVD in May 2000.

== Protest ==
When the film was shown at St. Francis Theatre in San Francisco, the Committee for the Freedom of Homosexuals picketed the film, protesting that it was disrespectful to the gay community in the way it "equated homosexual men with effeminacy, cowardice, and the elevation of self-interest over patriotic duty to one's country." Variety Magazine reported on the picket in their July 1969 issue with an embellished headline stating: "Pansies Picket Opening Of Gay Film In Frisco". One of the protesters told the San Francisco Chronicle:

The producers of such rot should take note that this film is not only an insult to the proud and 'manly' gay persons of this community, but to millions of homosexuals who conceal their identity to fight bravely and die proudly for their country which rejects them.

== Reception ==
Film critic Parker Tyler said he doubted if the film made any real money, and thought the film was "too lightly tossed aside by moviegoers." He opined that "it is an authentic work of the gay canon, high in homo echelons." He went on to say that the gay community "should take legitimate joy in it, regretting only that more beaver nudity is not present." Author Richard Barrios wrote "this was a tacky, R-rated romp, the kind made for drive-ins as soon as it was okay to show breasts and say a few dirty words." He also observed that "you don't dig for diamonds in a salt mine, and you don't expect class or insight with something like this film."

David-Alex Nahmod wrote in the Bay Area Reporter, "this awful film is a prime example of how far we've come; a cheaply produced, poorly written and directed farce, this movie makes us the butt of some truly tasteless jokes." He also questioned who this movie was "intended for; it's offensive to gays, and surely wouldn't interest straights; just who were the producers trying to reach?" Author Emily Hobson argued that the "majority of those who declared themselves homosexual before draft boards were indeed gay or bisexual, so this film misrepresented 'homosexual draft resistance' to play it for laughs." She further commented that "nonetheless, the film hinted at mainstream awareness of a more radical truth: activists were remaking gay identity by coming out against the war."

The New York Times film critic A. H. Weiler said the movie "which struggles with the comparatively new movie twist of feigned homosexuality as a draft dodging gimmick, is, unfortunately, neither gay nor deceptive." He further criticized the movie by commenting that it is a "decidedly juvenile caper" ... and it is "neither funny nor serious." Film critic Kevin Thomas said the film "is a hilarious yet surprisingly inoffensive comedy." He also observed that there are plenty of mishaps with the fake gay couple, "yet never once is the humor cruel; indeed, the picture has been so shrewdly and amiably written that not only homosexuals but also hawks are not likely to be turned off."

Richard Simon of The Sacramento Union had harsh words for the movie, saying; "there are not many films that are so painful that I am unable to sit through them, but Gay Deceivers is one of them." Likewise, Stanley Eichelbaum of The San Francisco Examiner was not impressed with the film either, writing; "it's poorly made and ineptly written; the humor is crude and strained, and the one joke plot is so fagged out after 15 minutes that the viewer suffers more embarrassment than the phony faggots."

== See also ==
- Streamers
- List of American films of 1969
- List of LGBTQ-related films of 1969
