= Michael Greer =

American actor (1938–2002)

- Born: James Robert Malley; April 20, 1938; Galesburg, Illinois, U.S.
- Died: September 14, 2002 (aged 64); Riverside, California, U.S.
- Occupations: Actor, comedian, cabaret performer
- Years active: Mid-1960s through 1990s

Michael Greer (born James Robert Malley; April 20, 1938 — September 14, 2002) was an American actor, comedian and cabaret performer. He is known for his appearances in the films The Gay Deceivers and Fortune and Men's Eyes, and for being one of the first openly gay actors to appear in major Hollywood films.

== Early life ==
Greer was born James Robert Malley in Galesburg, Illinois, to parents Charles and Elizabeth (née Koetter) Malley. Although his birth date has been given as April 20, 1943, his birth year was probably 1938, based on 1940 U.S. census records listing a 2-year-old "Jimmie Malley" and obituaries stating Greer's age as 64 when he died in 2002. He grew up in Galesburg, residing first with his parents and later with his aunt and uncle, and had two sisters and two half-brothers. Greer later said that his parents had divorced and each had married three times, and described his childhood as unhappy. He began performing at a young age, singing during intermissions at the local movie theater.

Greer left Galesburg in the mid-1950s. Despite being underage at 16, he enlisted in the U.S. Air Force and served three years in Japan and Korea. While in the service he formed a pop vocal group that performed in the style of The Four Aces.

After finishing his service, he moved to Boston and then to New York City in the early 1960s, where he worked as a furniture salesman while competing in "talent night" contests against other aspiring entertainers, including Tiny Tim and Barbra Streisand. Greer later worked as a floor captain at Arthur, the NYC discothèque opened by Sybil Burton, where he met celebrities such as Margot Fonteyn, Rudolf Nureyev, and Jacqueline Kennedy. He disliked his birth name, and in the mid-1960s he legally changed his name to "Michael Greer", choosing "Michael" because he liked the name and "Greer" after the actress Jane Greer.

== Career ==
=== Comedy and cabaret ===
In the fall of 1965, Greer relocated to Los Angeles, where he formed a comedy troupe called "Jack and the Giants" with Roy Gaynor and then-unknown Jim Bailey. While playing the Redwood Room club in L.A., the act was discovered and popularized by Judy Garland, leading to a 16-month engagement, after which the group broke up. Greer, who was by that time openly gay, continued to perform solo at San Francisco clubs such as The Fantasy and The Purple Onion. Greer's act included music, comedy and female impersonations of actresses such as Bette Davis and Tallulah Bankhead. Greer also developed a signature routine that he performed, with variations, for the rest of his career, in which he appeared as the Mona Lisa, speaking through a large picture frame held on his lap and making art-related jokes.

Due to Greer's difficulties obtaining film roles after the early 1970s, he concentrated on his cabaret act for most of his career, touring and playing clubs nationwide. He was a frequent and popular performer on the gay nightclub circuit for three decades. Greer was a featured performer on the "All-Gay Cruise", an ocean cruise for 300 gay men and lesbians documented by Cliff Jahr in a highly controversial 1975 New York Times travel feature, in which Jahr referred to Greer as "the gay world's Jonathan Winters" and likened him to "George Burns at a Friars' Roast." Greer's impersonation of Bette Davis was so perfect that, when she became unavailable, Greer was called upon to dub some of her lines in the TV miniseries The Dark Secret of Harvest Home (1978) and again in Wicked Stepmother (1989), her last film.

Two recordings of Greer's comedy routines were released: Tallulah in Heaven (1972, RipRap Records), an LP featuring his Tallulah Bankhead impersonation, and Don't Mess With Mona (2005, Gatorlegs Records), a posthumously released recording of a 1979 performance of his Mona Lisa routine. In addition to writing his own material, Greer also wrote comedy material for several well-known performers, including Phyllis Diller, Debbie Reynolds, Rip Taylor, and Larry Storch.

=== Stage ===
In 1968, Sal Mineo saw Greer's comic nightclub act in San Francisco and cast him as "Queenie", a gay prison inmate and drag queen, in Mineo's 1969 Los Angeles production of the John Herbert play Fortune and Men's Eyes. Greer played "Queenie" in both the Los Angeles and subsequent New York stage productions, logging over 400 performances in the role. Greer became close friends with both Mineo and Don Johnson, who was cast in the lead role of "Smitty".

Greer occasionally appeared in other stage plays over the years. In 1983 he appeared in New York City in an off-off-Broadway revival of Terrence McNally's The Ritz, a farce set in a gay Manhattan bathhouse, starring Warhol superstar Holly Woodlawn. He played an old-guard activist professor in a 1998 Santa Monica production of Mark Savage's coming-out musical, The Ballad of Little Mikey.

With composer Wayne Moore, Greer collaborated on the book for a 1992 musical, Freeway Dreams, about commuters stuck in traffic in Los Angeles. Greer also directed the Los Angeles production which ran for four months, and appeared on the original cast album (released in 1997 on Moore's Ducy Lee label) as the voice of "the car radio announcer on station KDUL in the Valley."

=== Film ===
Greer made his feature film debut in 1969 in the hit comedy The Gay Deceivers as "Malcolm", the flamboyant gay landlord of two heterosexual young men who pretend to be gay in an attempt to dodge the draft. In an effort to reduce the homophobia of the original script and present a more realistic and positive portrayal of the gay characters, Greer rewrote much of the dialogue and worked with the director. Upon release, the film was protested by gays for propagating stereotypes of gay men as "swishy", effeminate draft dodgers. However, the film was progressive for its time in featuring an openly gay actor playing an openly gay character in a happy long-term gay relationship, rather than having gay characters suffer loneliness, anguish or tragedy. Greer's performance drew good reviews. He received star billing and was featured in advertising for the film.

The following year Greer co-starred (with Don Johnson) as an underground rock musician in MGM's 1970 box office flop The Magic Garden of Stanley Sweetheart, for which he also co-wrote and sang the song "Water". He appeared in two softcore pornography films, the erotic sci-fi film The Curious Female, in which he played the operator of a computer dating service in the year 2177, and Diamond Stud.

In 1971, Greer reprised his stage role as "Queenie" in MGM's film version of Fortune and Men's Eyes, a film role he had previously turned down. Once again, Greer rewrote most of his lines to better fit his conception of the character. He composed the song "It's Free", which he performed in drag in the film. Despite the filmmakers' controversial changes to the original stage play, including exploiting the camp and drag-queen elements portrayed by the Queenie character, Greer's performance received positive reviews and has been viewed as a strong statement of gay assertiveness. Greer felt that his film performance of "Queenie" was the definitive one, and was proud of it.

Greer aspired to play a diverse range of movie roles, at one point optioning and writing a screenplay about mass murderer Richard Speck in which he hoped to star. However, his ability to get parts was limited by homophobia and typecasting. Although most media in the late 1960s and early 1970s avoided directly stating that Greer was homosexual (and frequently implied that he was interested in women), he refused to marry a woman or otherwise pretend to be heterosexual for the sake of his acting career, despite his agent's advice to do so. His last major film role was "Thom," the "dark stranger" in the 1973 horror film Messiah of Evil (also known as Dead People). Thereafter, his film career was limited to occasional small roles in movies such as Summer School Teachers (1974) (in which he played a heterosexual celebrity with a food fetish) and The Rose (1979) (in which he again played a drag performer).

=== Television ===
During the late 1960s and 1970s, Greer appeared on television episodes of Mannix, Ironside, The Streets of San Francisco, Rowan and Martin's Laugh-In, and Sunshine. He was a regular performer on the short-lived Bobbie Gentry Happiness Hour in 1974. In the 1980s and 1990s, he provided the voice of several television cartoon characters, most notably as both Mayor Oscar Bulloney and Sadie Wowcow on the ABC cartoon series Wild West C.O.W.-Boys of Moo Mesa (1992–1993).

== Personal life ==
Greer was a longtime resident of Los Angeles and an active member of the Beaux Arts Society, Inc. (USA), which named him a Distinguished Artist in 1996.

A heavy smoker, Greer died of lung cancer in Riverside, California, on September 14, 2002.

== Quotations ==
- "I have an unnatural act."
- "How can I be 'in' and 'out' at the same time? It's too exhausting!"

== Filmography ==
=== Film ===
- The Gay Deceivers (1969) .... Malcolm
- Diamond Stud (1970) .... Jim's Betting Friend
- The Magic Garden of Stanley Sweetheart (1970) .... Danny
- The Curious Female (1970) .... Bixby
- Fortune and Men's Eyes (1971) .... Queenie
- Messiah of Evil (alternate title: Dead People) (1973) .... Thom
- Summer School Teachers (1974) .... John John Lacey
- The Rose (1979) .... Emcee
- The Lonely Guy (1984) .... Counterman
- Spree (1996) .... TV Store Clerk (final film role)

=== Television ===
- Mannix - Season 3, Episode 12, "Missing: Sun and Sky" (1969) .... Second Boy
- Ironside - Season 4, Episode 2, "No Game For Amateurs" (1970) .... Phil
- The Streets of San Francisco - Season 1, Episode 13, "A Trout in the Milk" (1973) .... Omar (uncredited)
- Rowan and Martin's Laugh-In - Season 6, Episode 19 (1973) .... Himself (cameo appearance)
- The Bobbie Gentry Happiness Hour - Various episodes (1974) .... Himself (regular performer)
- Sunshine - Season 1, Episode 1, "Sweet Misery" (1975) .... Big Mama
- Dinah! - Season 2, Episode 168 (1976) .... Himself
- Darkwing Duck - Season 2, Episode 12, "A Brush With Oblivion" (1991) .... Museum Curator (voice)
- Camp Candy - Season 3, Episode 6, "When It Rains...It Snows" (1992) .... Unknown character (voice)
- Wild West C.O.W.-Boys of Moo Mesa - Various episodes (1992–1993) .... Mayor Oscar Bulloney, Sadie Wowcow (voice)
