= One Man (1977 film) =

- Directed by: Robin Spry
- Written by: Robin Spry; Peter Pearson; Peter Madden
- Produced by: Tom Daly; Michael J. F. Scott; Vladimir Valenta; James de Beaujeu Domville; Roman Kroitor (exec.)
- Starring: Len Cariou; Jayne Eastwood; Barry Morse; Jean Lapointe; Carole Lazare; August Schellenberg; Danny Freedman; Jacques Godin; Vlasta Vrána; Sean Sullivan; Gilles Renaud; Peter MacNeill
- Cinematography: Douglas Kiefer
- Edited by: John Kramer; Les Halman (sound); Ken Page (sound)
- Music by: Ben Low
- Distributed by: National Film Board
- Release date: August 25, 1977 (Montreal)
- Running time: 77 minutes
- Country: Canada
- Language: English
- Budget: $615,283

One Man is a Canadian drama film, released in 1977. It was directed by Robin Spry and stars Len Cariou.

== Plot ==
Jason Brady is a television journalist in Montreal, who is investigating a chemical leak from a local factory which has poisoned a number of children.

== Production ==
The film, made on a budget of $615,283 (equivalent to $3,006,829 in 2025)., had relatively limited theatrical distribution, screening only in Toronto and Ottawa before airing on CBC Television in 1979. It also had a brief theatrical run in New York City, following Cariou's Tony Award-winning performance in Sweeney Todd: The Demon Barber of Fleet Street.

== Awards ==
- ACTRA Awards, Montreal: Film of the Year, 1978
- Film Festival Antwerpen, Antwerp: Second Best Film of the Festival, 1978
- Film Festival Antwerpen, Antwerp: Honorable Mention by the Press Jury, 1978
- 28th Canadian Film Awards: Best Original Screenplay - Robin Spry, Peter Pearson & Peter Madden, 1977
- 28th Canadian Film Awards: Best Actor - Len Cariou, 1977
- 28th Canadian Film Awards: Best Supporting Actor - Jean Lapointe, 1977
- 28th Canadian Film Awards: Best Supporting Actress - Carole Lazare, 1977
- 28th Canadian Film Awards: Best Overall Sound - Claude Hazanavicius, 1977
- 28th Canadian Film Awards: Best Sound Editing - Les Halman and Ken Page, 1977

It was also nominated, but did not win, for Best Picture, Best Director (Spry), Best Actress (Eastwood) and Best Cinematography (Douglas Kiefer).

== Works cited ==
- Evans, Gary (1991). In the National Interest: A Chronicle of the National Film Board of Canada from 1949 to 1989. University of Toronto Press. ISBN 0802027849.
