= Les Philharmonistes =

1971 Canadian documentary film

- Directed by: Yves Leduc
- Produced by: François Séguillon
- Cinematography: Bernard Gosselin
- Edited by: Yves Leduc
- Production company: National Film Board of Canada
- Release date: 1971
- Running time: 57 minutes
- Country: Canada
- Language: French

Les Philharmonistes is a Canadian documentary film, directed by Yves Leduc and released in 1971. The film centres on a group of workers at the Casavant Frères organ factory in Saint-Hyacinthe, Quebec, who are also active as an amateur orchestra.

The film won the Canadian Film Award for Best Theatrical Documentary at the 23rd Canadian Film Awards.
