= Danny Freedman =

Canadian actor

Danny Freedman was a Canadian actor. He was best known for his performance as Mona in the film Fortune and Men's Eyes, for which he won the Canadian Film Award for Best Supporting Actor at the 23rd Canadian Film Awards in 1971. He was born in Montreal.

Freedman had no other major film roles, although he had minor supporting appearances in the films One Man and U-Turn. He was primarily a stage actor, whose performances included Paul Foster's Tom Paine, John Palmer's Memories of My Brother, Fabian Jennings' Charles Manson a.k.a. Jesus Christ and Diane Grant's Broom Hilda. He was a roommate of the three artists associated with the General Idea arts collective in the late 1960s and early 1970s.

Freedman had a small part on the American soap opera The Guiding Light.
