= Tiki Tiki =

- Directed by: Gerald Potterton
- Written by: Jerome Chodorov; Donald Brittain; Gerald Potterton
- Produced by: Gerald Potterton
- Starring: Barry Baldaro; Gay Claitman; Patrick Conlon; Peter Cullen; Jean Shepherd; Joan Stuart; Ted Zeigler
- Cinematography: Gennadi Tsekavyj; Viktor Yakushev
- Edited by: Peter Hearn
- Music by: Jerry Blatt; L. Burnstein
- Production company: Potterton Productions
- Release date: September 25, 1971
- Running time: 71 minutes
- Country: Canada
- Language: English

Tiki Tiki is a Canadian comedy film, directed by Gerald Potterton and released in 1971.

== Summary ==
Created by intercutting animated sequences with live-action footage from the Russian children's film Aybolit-66, the animated sequences tell the story of a group of monkeys who are working to produce a film, while the Aybolit-66 footage represents the film they are making in this psychedelic satire of 1970s Hollywood counterculture.

== Production ==
The film was inspired in part by Woody Allen's 1966 film What's Up, Tiger Lily?, which used original dialogue to recontextualize a foreign-language film.

The film's voice cast included Barry Baldaro, Gay Claitman, Patrick Conlon, Peter Cullen, Jean Shepherd, Joan Stuart and Ted Zeigler.

During the film's promotion, Potterton acknowledged that it was a challenging film to market, as his production company wasn't sure whether to aim it at "kids or stoned teenagers or whatever", and has referred to the finished product as "a cross between a whacked out animated version of Easy Rider and the Olsen and Johnson musical Hellzapoppin'".

== Reception and legacy ==
Aleksandr Kuznetsov, the production designer of Aybolit-66, was named the winner of the Canadian Film Award for Best Art Direction/Production Design at the 23rd Canadian Film Awards.

In 2023, Telefilm Canada announced that Tiki Tiki was one of 23 titles that would be digitally restored under its new Canadian Cinema Reignited program to preserve classic Canadian films.

The film was released on Blu-ray by Vinegar Syndrome under the Canadian International Pictures label on August 25, 2026.
