= Allan Royal =

Canadian actor (born 1944)

Allan Royal (born August 17, 1944) is a Canadian actor, who is also sometimes credited as Allan G. Royal and Alan Royal. He is known for playing the crime reporter Tom Kirkwood on the hit Canadian police drama Night Heat from 1985 to 1989. He is also known for his recurring role on such programs as the American TV drama Falcon Crest as well as roles in numerous other TV shows, movies, and plays.

== Early career ==
Royal grew up in a bilingual home. His father was a French Canadian and his mother was of British ancestry. He grew up in Montreal's West End. Royal began performing while still in high school, and ultimately left Montreal to study acting in New York with Lee Strasberg. He returned to Canada, performing on stage in Toronto beginning in the mid-1960s. He joined the Toronto Arts Production theater company, where he played a wide range of roles throughout the 1970s, in new plays as well as productions of Shakespeare and Molière.

== Career ==
In 1985, Royal joined the cast of a new television production, Night Heat, which aired on both Canadian and American television. Prior to the end of Night Heat, he had moved to Los Angeles, where he hoped to appear in more films. He instead portrayed novelist R.D. Young on Falcon Crest. After playing the role for a year, he appeared in They Came from Outer Space from 1990 to 1991, and another TV series, Foreign Affairs, in 1992 and 1993.

Throughout the late 1980s well into the 2010s, Royal has worked steadily, appearing in productions that were made in the US and several that were made in Canada, such as the 1988 film Switching Channels, a remake of the 1931 movie classic Front Page, which was filmed in Toronto. In addition, he was in several made-for-television films, including a role as John Sculley in the 1999 production Pirates of Silicon Valley, and the role of Mark Roberts in the 1999 production of "Crime in Connecticut: The Story of Alex Kelly" (later renamed "Cry Rape"). Royal also appeared in guest roles in Star Trek: Voyager, Amerika, Forever Knight, Mutant X, Relic Hunter, The Practice, JAG, and The Border. He played Chief Constable Stockton in the Canadian detective show Murdoch Mysteries and Judge Phillip Hopkins in three episodes of Suits.

In 2011, he returned to the stage in Toronto, where he had not performed live since the early-1980s, to star in a one-man play, The Disappearing Act, which he also wrote.

== Filmography ==
=== Film ===
Year	Title	Role
1971	The Only Thing You Know	Scott
1977	Welcome to Blood City	Peter
1979	Fish Hawk	Will Fellows
1979	Title Shot	Dunlop
1982	Trapped	Leonard
1987	Tomorrow's a Killer	Conley Reid
1987	Taking Care	Dr. Barton
1988	Switching Channels	Obregon
2006	One Way	Edgar Rasky
2024	Hot Frosty	Mortimer

=== Television ===
Year	Title	Role	Notes
1973–75	Police Surgeon	Chick, Les, Tony	3 episodes
1977	The Man Inside	Nelson	Television film
1977	The Fighting Men	Wayne Archer	Television film
1980–85	The Littlest Hobo	Fanagan, Olivier, unnamed	6 episodes
1982	Hangin' In	Roland, Mr. Glade	2 episodes
1983	Vanderberg	Ryan Evans	Television film
1983	Moving Targets	Lew Parker	Television film
1985–89	Night Heat	Tom "Tommy" Kirkwood	Main cast
1986	Philip Marlowe, Private Eye	Lucky Landrey	Episode: "Blackmailers Don't Shoot"
1986	Hot Shots	Kirkwood	Episode: "All in the Game"
1986	Christmas Eve	Grodin	Television film
1987	Amerika	President	Miniseries, 2 episodes
1988–89	Falcon Crest	Daniel Cabot	8 episodes
1990	Dragnet	Lt. Hyde	Episode: "Requiem"
1990–91	They Came from Outer Space	Lt. Col. Tom Barker	Main cast
1991	Matlock	Howard Boggs	Episode: "The Parents"
1991	Street Legal	Captain McDonnell	Episode: "On Women and Independence"
1992	Jake and the Fatman	Mitchell Lazarus	Episode: "Last Dance"
1992	Foreign Affairs	Andrew Copeland	unknown episodes
1992	Life Goes On	Ben	Episode: "Consenting Adults"
1993	Beyond Reality	Bobby's Father	Episode: "Face-Off"
1993	Bakersfield P.D.	President Childs	Episode: "Cable Does Not Pay"
1993	E.N.G.	Mark Ulster	Episode: "And the Winner Is.."
1994	Mary Silliman's War	Judge	Television film
1994	Forever Knight	Ronald Gault	Episode: "Undue Process"
1994–95	Dr. Quinn, Medicine Woman	Jackson Tait	2 episodes
1995	Kung Fu: The Legend Continues	Dante Carmel	Episode: "Citizen Caine"
1995	Bloodknot	Arthur / Father	Television film
1996	Star Trek: Voyager	Captain Braxton	Episodes: "Future's End" Part I, Part II
1997	Any Mother's Son	Ben	Television film
1998	JAG	Skipper	Episode: "Yesterday's Heroes"
1999	Party of Five	Andrew	Episode: "Fam-i-ly"
1999	Cry Rape	Mark Roberts	Television film
1999	Pirates of Silicon Valley	John Sculley	Television film
2000	Psi Factor	Dale Wilson	Episode: "GeoCore"
2000	The Avengers: United They Stand	Grim Reaper (voice)	Episode: "The Sorceress's Apprentice"
2000	The Practice	Dr. Bernard White, Dr. Dennis Murphy	2 episodes
2000	Code Name: Eternity	Dr. George Keating	2 episodes
2001	Relic Hunter	Dr. Alistair Newell	Episode: "Sydney at Ten"
2002	Doc	Ben	Episode: "Second Time Around"
2002	The Brady Bunch in the White House	Chief Justice	Television film
2003	Mutant X	Dr. Nigel Rigas	Episode: "Hard Time"
2003	Soul Food	Professor Lecki	Episode: "Life 101"
2003	DC 9/11: Time of Crisis	Karl Rove	Television film
2004	Reversible Errors	O'Grady	Television film
2004	Kevin Hill	Bryce Graydon	Episode: "Snack Daddy"
2004	Sue Thomas: F.B.Eye	Mr. Blanton	Episode: "Simon Says"
2006	Monster Warriors	Mayor Mel	Episode: "The Giant Spider Invasion"
2007	'Til Death Do Us Part	Dr. Gerald Clark	Episode: "The Airplane Murder"
2008	The Good Witch	Walter Cobb	Television film
2008–14	Murdoch Mysteries	Chief Stockton	4 episodes
2009	The Border	Cyrus Church	Episode: "Killer Debt"
2011	Skins	Judge	Episode: "Stanley"
2011	The Kennedys	Allen Dulles	Episode: "Bay of Pigs"
2012	Heartland	Mr. Walker	Episode: "Fool's Gold"
2012	The Firm	Judge Trott	3 episodes
2014	Suits	Judge Phillip Hopkins	3 episodes
2015	The Lizzie Borden Chronicles	Judge Franklin	2 episodes
2023	Fall into Winter	Papa Joe McLeod	Television film
2023	Essex County	David	Miniseries, 3 episodes
