= The Megantic Outlaw =

- Genre: Drama; Biography
- Written by: Ron Kelly
- Directed by: Ron Kelly
- Starring: Gary McKeehan; Sydney Brown; Jane Mallett; Carole Lazare; Lloyd Bochner
- Theme music composer: Doug Riley
- Country of origin: Canada
- Original language: English

Production
- Producer: Ron Kelly
- Cinematography: Robert Hutt
- Editors: Ron Kelly; Clarke Mackey
- Running time: 90 minutes

Original release
- Network: CBC Television
- Release: January 27, 1971

The Megantic Outlaw is a Canadian historical drama television film, directed by Ron Kelly and broadcast by CBC Television in 1971. The film is a portrait of Donald Morrison, a man from Lac-Mégantic who became an outlaw in 1887 when he tried to defend his parents from being evicted from their home by an unscrupulous landowner.

The cast includes Gary McKeehan as Donald Morrison, Sydney Brown and Jane Mallett as his parents, Carole Lazare as his fiancée, and Lloyd Bochner as police inspector Carpenter.

The film was shot in various historic and rural areas around Toronto in 1970, including Todmorden Mills, Black Creek Pioneer Village and the village of Brougham.

The film won two Canadian Film Awards at the 23rd Canadian Film Awards, for Best TV Drama and Best Actress (Non-Feature) (Lazare).
