= Carole Lazare =

Canadian film and television actress

- Other name: Carol Lazare
- Occupations: Actress; writer
- Years active: 1971-1988
- Known for: One Man; The Fly
- Awards: Canadian Screen Award for Best Supporting Actress

Carole Lazare, sometimes credited as Carol Lazare, is a former Canadian film and television actress who was prominent in the 1970s. She is most noted for her role in the film One Man, for which she won the Canadian Film Award for Best Supporting Actress in 1977.

She also appeared in the films The Megantic Outlaw, Lies My Father Told Me, and The Fly, and in guest roles in the television series The Starlost, King of Kensington and Matt and Jenny.

She was later a writer for the erotic television series Bliss.
