= The Only Thing You Know =

- Directed by: Clarke Mackey
- Written by: Clarke Mackey
- Produced by: Clarke Mackey
- Starring: Ann Knox; Allan Royal; John Denos; Hugh McIntyre; Eileen McIntyre
- Cinematography: Paul Lang
- Edited by: Iain Ewing; Clarke Mackey; Rebecca Schechter
- Music by: Paul Craven; Iain Ewing
- Distributed by: Canadian Filmmakers' Distribution Centre
- Release date: 1971
- Running time: 82 minutes
- Country: Canada
- Language: English

The Only Thing You Know is a 1971 Canadian drama film, directed by Clarke Mackey.

Described by critics as a female version of the 1964 film Nobody Waved Good-bye, the film stars Ann Knox as Ann, a teenager who is dissatisfied with her suburban Toronto life. Striking out on her own, she moves in with her boyfriend Scott (Allan Royal) in the downtown St. James Town neighbourhood, but becomes embroiled in a complex love triangle with Scott and his friend Paul (John Denos).

The film's cast also includes Hugh McIntyre and Eileen McIntyre as Ann's parents.

== Production ==
The film was influenced by the then-experimental blend of docufiction techniques innovated by films such as Nobody Waved Good-bye and À tout prendre. Its script consisted solely of a 15-page story outline, around which the actors improvised their dialogue so that the film would feel like a documentary. It was made on a budget of just $23,000.

== Reception ==
Knox won the Canadian Film Award for Best Actress, and Mackey won a special jury award for the film.

Despite favourable critical response and Knox's award win the film received only limited release, in part because it had been shot on 16 mm film, which very few movie theatres in Canada had the equipment to screen, while Mackey did not have the budget to convert it to the more normal 35 mm film. Apart from the Stratford Film Festival, the film was never screened theatrically outside of Toronto, and even CBC Television rejected the film at the time as too experimental for a mass-market network television airing. Although the film was strongly championed by The New York Times film critic Bosley Crowther, Mackey was also unable to secure a distribution deal in the United States.

The film was screened at the 1984 Festival of Festivals as part of Front & Centre, a special retrospective program of artistically and culturally significant films from throughout the history of Canadian cinema, and was later broadcast on CBC and TVOntario in the 1980s, but was generally not widely seen until it was released on DVD in 2006.
