= Ann Knox =

Canadian actress

- Occupation: Actress
- Known for: The Only Thing You Know

Ann Knox is a former Canadian film actress, who won the Canadian Film Award for Best Actress in 1971 for her performance in The Only Thing You Know.

Despite her award win, the film had limited commercial release and Knox took no other known acting roles.

Knox was originally from Guelph, Ontario. At the time of her award win, she worked primarily as an art teacher at Victoria Park Collegiate in Toronto, Ontario; by 1975, she was co-owner of a wool and fabric shop with branches in Toronto and Vancouver, British Columbia.
