= John Herbert (playwright) =

Canadian playwright and theatre director

- Born: John Herbert Brundage; October 13, 1926; Toronto, Ontario, Canada
- Died: June 22, 2001 (aged 74); Toronto, Ontario, Canada
- Writing career
- Notable work: Fortune and Men's Eyes (1967)
- Website: www.npconsultants.com/johnherbert/johnherbert/index.html

John Herbert was the pen name of John Herbert Brundage (13 October 1926 – 22 June 2001), a Canadian playwright, drag queen, and theatre director best known for his 1967 play Fortune and Men's Eyes.

== Background ==
Herbert was born in Toronto on October 13, 1926. After completing high school, he worked in the advertising department of Eaton's and began competing in drag pageants. In the 1940s, Herbert was the victim of an attempted robbery while he was dressed as a woman. (Note: One source asserts that the attack occurred in 1947, another is vague on the timing, and The New York Times obituary of Herbert asserts that it occurred during Herbert's teens. The cause of the confusion may be the conflation of this arrest with Herbert's subsequent arrest for gross indecency. He served another sentence for indecency at reformatory in Mimico in 1948.) His assailants falsely claimed that Herbert had solicited them for sex, and Herbert was accused and convicted of indecency under Canada's same-sex sexual activity law, which was not repealed until 1969. After being convicted, Herbert served time in a youth reformatory in Guelph, Ontario. (Note: One source states that Herbert was imprisoned for six months at Guelph, while another states that he spent four months there.) Herbert later served another sentence for indecency at reformatory in Mimico.

Later, Herbert travelled across North America doing odd jobs to support himself before returning to Toronto in 1955. He studied at the National Ballet School of Canada and at Dora Mavor Moore's New Play Society. Herbert co-founded the Garret Theatre with his sister Nana Brundage in 1960. (Note: The decision to drop Brundage from his professional name was made to avoid brother-sister associations with Nana, who had already established a name for herself using the family name.)

Herbert wrote Fortune and Men's Eyes in 1964 based on his time behind bars. He included the character of Queenie as an authorial self-insertion. The play was first staged as a Stratford Festival workshop directed by Bruno Gerussi, in 1965, but Herbert was unable to find a theatre company willing to mount a full production in Canada. It ultimately premiered as an off-Broadway play in New York City, produced by David Rothenberg and Mitchell Nestor, on February 14, 1967 at the Broadway Actor's Playhouse. Because of his past conviction, Herbert faced difficulties entering the United States to attend productions of his work.

Fortune and Men's Eyes remains the most widely produced play in the history of Canadian theatre, both in Canada and internationally. It has been translated into more than 40 languages and staged internationally. A motion picture version of the work, based on a screenplay by Herbert, was directed by Harvey Hart in 1971. The play had a profound impact on producer David Rothenberg. Rothenberg went on to found the Fortune Society, a nonprofit advocacy organization that supports incarcerated and formerly-incarcerated people reintegrate into society.

Although none of Herbert's other plays were as successful as Fortune and Men's Eyes, Herbert remained active as a dancer, a theatre director, an acting teacher and a theatre lecturer at Ryerson University, Glendon College, York University and the University of Toronto.

Herbert died in 2001. The manual typewriter on which he composed Fortune and Men's Eyes is in the possession of the Canadian Lesbian and Gay Archives. A selection of manuscripts, letters and personal papers were donated to the University of Waterloo Library in 1982.

== Selected works ==
- Felice (1955)
- Pearl Divers (1956)
- Beer Room (1957)
- Close Friends (1958)
- A Ruby Fell (1959)
- Time To a Waltz (1959)
- Private Club (1960)
- A Household God (1961)
- World of Woyzeck (1963)
- Born of Medusa's Blood (1965)
- Fortune and Men's Eyes (1967)
- Omphale and the Hero (1971)
- The Dinosaurs (1973)
- The Token Star (1976)
- The Power of Paper Dolls (1979)
- Magda (1981)
- The Butterfly and the Nightingale (1984)
- The Biographers (1985)
- Blanche and Rose's Dream Song (1986)
- The Primadonna (1988)
- Broken Antique Dolls (1991)
- Merchants of Bay Street (1993)
- Family of a Monster (1995)
- Marilyn at Seventy (1995)
- Marlene Richdiet (1998)
- One Castle Court (1999)
