= Fortune and Men's Eyes =

- One of theatrical release posters
- Directed by: Harvey Hart
- Written by: John Herbert (play and screenplay)
- Produced by: Lester Persky; Lewis M. Allen
- Starring: Wendell Burton; Michael Greer; Zooey Hall; Danny Freedman; Larry Perkins; James Barron; Hugh Webster; Tom Harvey; Jan Granik; Kirk McColl; Vance Davis; Robert Goodier; Lázaro Pérez
- Cinematography: Georges Dufaux
- Edited by: Douglas Robertson
- Music by: Galt MacDermot
- Distributed by: Metro-Goldwyn-Mayer
- Release date: June 15, 1971 (U.S.)
- Running time: 102 minutes
- Countries: United States; Canada
- Language: English
- Budget: CAD 1,109,000

Fortune and Men's Eyes is a 1967 play and 1971 film written by John Herbert about a young man's experience in prison, exploring themes of homosexuality and sexual slavery.

== Plot of the play ==
The plot follows Smitty, a 17-year-old, after he is sentenced to six months in a youth reformatory. His cellmates are Rocky, a "dangerous and unpredictable" 19-year-old serving time for stealing a car from his male lover; Mona, an 18- or 19-year-old who is sentenced for making a homosexual pass at a group of boys; and Queenie, a flamboyant homosexual serving time for robbing an old woman. The only other character who appears onstage is a corrections officer.

Smitty, who asserts that he is heterosexual, seems to get along with his new cellmates quickly. Queenie, who has friends amongst the "politicians" of the prison, informs him of what to expect, and warns that Mona has been gang-raped because he did not have an "old man" looking out for him. Rocky later manipulates Smitty into becoming his sexual subordinate by threatening to arrange a similar treatment for him if he refuses. Smitty tries to make the best of his new situation, and he learns that Rocky knows a secret about the Guard taking a bribe and uses that secret to influence the guard as needed. Smitty also learns of further horrors to which uncooperative inmates can be subjected. Queenie encourages Smitty to beat up Rocky and spread the news so he can win a better protector from amongst the "politicians" in the guard house; Queenie makes this suggestion for his own benefit rather than Smitty's.

At Christmas time, the inmates prepare to perform in a pageant. Queenie has planned a drag act, and Mona intends to read Shakespeare. Mona's act is rejected at the last minute, and Smitty uses the information he knows to get the guard to leave him alone with Mona while everyone else attends the show. Mona admits he was falsely accused of the crime for which he is serving time, and Smitty admits unhappiness that Queenie is now choosing his lovers for him. Smitty makes an offer to become Mona's "old man", which Mona refuses. Smitty becomes upset, but Mona comforts him with Shakespeare's poem When in disgrace with fortune and men's eyes. The two are laughing and embracing when Rocky and Queenie return from the pageant: Rocky and Queenie immediately begin to beat Mona, accusing him of making a sexual advance on Smitty. The Guard takes Mona away to be tortured, despite Smitty's pleas. Angrily, Smitty threatens both Queenie and Rocky, establishing himself as the new dominant male in the cell. The play ends with Smitty listening to Mona's punishment offstage and swearing to "pay them back".

== History ==
The title of the play comes from William Shakespeare's Sonnet 29, which begins with the line, "When, in disgrace with fortune and men's eyes...". The play has been translated into 14 languages and produced in over 100 countries. It is the most published Canadian play, and won the Dominion Drama Festival's Massey Award in 1968 (an award which Herbert refused) and the Floyd S. Chalmers Canadian Play Award in 1975.

Fortune and Men's Eyes was inspired in part by Herbert's own experience. In the 1940s, he was attacked outside a gay bar while dressed in drag and then convicted of indecency based on the testimony of his attackers. Following the conviction, he was imprisoned in the Ontario Reformatory in Guelph. The character of Queenie in the play is an authorial self-insertion.

Herbert encountered difficulties in getting the play staged. After being rejected by several directors, Herbert, on the recommendation of Robertson Davies, who frequented the University Club at which Herbert worked as a waiter, sent the script to Douglas Campbell at the Stratford Festival. Campbell accepted the play for the festival's young actors workshop and assigned it to Bruno Gerussi to direct, but the Stratford Festival's board of directors forbade the production from being staged publicly.

Herbert sent a copy of Fortune and Men's Eyes to renowned Canadian theatre critic Nathan Cohen, who replied, "I hope you understand that there's not a chance in the world of this getting a professional production in Canada. I've taken the liberty of sending it to a producer of my acquaintance in New York and, of course, promise nothing." Cohen recommended the play to Broadway press agent David Rothenberg, who in turn recommended it to Dustin Hoffman. Hoffman workshopped the play at the New York Actors Studio in 1966, taking the role of Rocky, while Jon Voight played Smitty.

The play, produced by Rothenberg, premiered off-Broadway in New York City at the Actors Playhouse from February 23, 1967, to January 1968. Reviews were mixed, and many reviewers were shocked by the subject matter. Reviewer Herbert Whittaker wrote in The Globe and Mail that the play was "the art of washing our dirty linen in the neighbor's yard." Cohen wrote in the Toronto Star that the play "lifts the carpet and shows what is underneath"; he added that it "asks deeply disturbing questions about long-established personal and social assumptions. It does not enrich our vision. It undermines it".

Fortune and Men's Eyes inspired the creation of the Fortune Society, a New York City-based advocacy and support organization for former prisoners.

The play toured to Chicago, San Francisco, Montreal, and Toronto.

In 1969, the play was produced and directed by Sal Mineo at the Coronet Theatre in Los Angeles. Don Johnson played the lead role of Smitty and Michael Greer played the role of Queenie, Smitty's cellmate. Mineo took the role of Rocky. The role of Rabbit was played by William Mueller. This production garnered more critical approval, but included additional scenes which had not been approved by Herbert.

== Film adaptation ==
A film adaptation of Fortune and Men's Eyes was released in 1971. Directed by Harvey Hart, it starred Wendell Burton as Smitty, Michael Greer as Queenie, Danny Freedman as Mona, Hugh Webster as Rabbit and Zooey Hall as Rocky.

Freedman won the Canadian Film Award for Best Supporting Actor at the 23rd Canadian Film Awards in 1971. At the same time, editor Douglas Robertson won the Canadian Film Award for Best Film Editing.
