= Clarke Mackey =

Canadian filmmaker, author, and educator (born 1950)

Clarke Mackey (born September 30, 1950) is a Canadian filmmaker, author, and educator. He is known for his first feature film, The Only Thing You Know (1972), and for the focus in his filmmaking and writing on vernacular culture. His book on the topic, Random Acts of Culture: Reclaiming Art and Community in the 21st Century, was published in 2010. Mackey is Professor Emeritus in the Department of Film and Media at Queen's University in Kingston, Ontario, where he taught for thirty years.

== Early works ==
Mackey began producing short films as a teenager. and three were broadcast on Canadian national television. At age sixteen, he was also credited as one of the producers of David Secter's 1966 film, The Offering.

He directed his first feature film, The Only Thing You Know, in mid-1970. Using a documentary shooting style and improvised dialogue, it tells the story of a teenage girl's attempts at independence. Made during a period in Canadian cinema that saw a marked growth in feature filmmaking, in October 1971 the film won two Canadian Film Awards: one to Ann Knox for Performance by a Lead Actress, and a Special Award to Mackey "for outstanding achievement in making his first film." The film was restored and released on DVD, with commentaries and additional material, in 2006.

Mackey was one of four cinematographers who worked on Festival Express, a documentary about a rock festival that travelled across Canada in summer 1970. Featuring Janis Joplin, the Grateful Dead and The Band, the film was not completed and released until 2003, thirty-three years after the original event. Writer Peter Steven called Mackey's 1977 documentary A Right to Live "one of the key moments in the history of committed documentary in Canada."

In the 1980s, Mackey directed several episodes of the Emmy Award-winning TV series Degrassi Junior High. His second theatrical feature, the drama Taking Care (1987), won a Canadian Film and Television Association Award as Best Feature and lead Kate Lynch was nominated for the Best Actress Genie Award in 1988. Target, a project in digital interactive drama that Mackey directed, won a CINDY Award from the Association of Visual Communicators, in Los Angeles, in 1989.

== Work in vernacular culture ==
In the early 1980s Mackey worked for six years with children in a nursery school. After this experience, Mackey focused much of his personal work on exploring vernacular culture in many forms. Dance on the Edge, Mackey's third feature, an experimental documentary about a vernacular celebration, premiered at the Figueira da Foz International Film Festival in Portugal in 1996. His documentary website, Memory Palace: Vernacular Culture in the Digital Age, was nominated for a WebSage Streamers Award and was featured in Forbes magazine (1999). In 2000 Mackey worked without a crew or lights to produce Disrobing the Emperor: The New Commons in Mexico, a profile of three impoverished communities. Eyes in the Back of Your Head (2003) was made in collaboration with ex-federal inmates in Kingston, Ontario.

Mackey's 2010 book, Random Acts of Culture, documents his decades-long study of vernacular culture and outlines his view of it. The book argues that, in addition to fine art and mass culture, there is a third category of cultural expression: vernacular culture. Examples of this are conversations between friends, social gatherings and rituals, play and participatory sports, informal storytelling, musical jam sessions, cooking and gardening, homemade architecture, and street festivals. Mackey maintains that practising and celebrating these unscripted activities—at the expense of passive, consumer culture—would benefit both people and communities.

== Recent work ==
Since 2010, as producer, writer, and/or director, Mackey has made micro-budget productions about community activism in Eastern Ontario. Til the Cows Come Home (2014) documents citizen opposition to the closure of the prison farm at Collins Bay Institution, in Kingston, in 2010. His feature-length archival documentary, Revolution Begins at Home (2016) recounts the story of his own family and radical politics in Toronto of the late 1960s. In 2022, he released a fictional audio drama, in six episodes, The Makers and Shakers Society.

== Media ==
=== Television and film ===
- On Nothing Days (1967)
- Ruins (1968)
- Grass (1968)
- Mihi P. (1969)
- The Only Thing You Know (1970)
- A Right To Live (1975)
- All Day Long (1983)
- Pulling Flowers (1984)
- Taking Care (1987)
- Dance on the Edge (1995)
- Disrobing the Emperor (2000)
- Eyes in the Back of Your Head (2003)
- New Season Coming (2008)
- Til the Cows Come Home (2014)
- Revolution Begins at Home (2016)
- On the Day the World Begins Again (2019)

=== Audio drama ===
- The Makers and Shakers Society (2022)

=== Books ===
- Random Acts of Culture: Reclaiming Art and Community in the 21st Century (2010). Toronto: Between the Lines. ISBN 978-1-897071-64-9.
