= Earl Pomerantz =

Canadian television producer and writer (1945–2020)

- Born: February 4, 1945; Toronto, Ontario, Canada
- Died: March 7, 2020 (aged 75); Los Angeles, California, U.S.
- Occupations: Producer, screenwriter
- Years active: 1970–2020

Earl Pomerantz (February 4, 1945 – March 7, 2020) was a Canadian-born screenwriter, who spent almost the entirety of his career working in U.S. television comedy.

== Career ==
Pomerantz wrote a weekly column for the Toronto Telegram in the late 1960s. He broke into writing TV comedy while living in Toronto, getting a position as a writer on 1970's The Hart & Lorne Terrific Hour, which starred his brother Hart Pomerantz and Lorne Michaels.

Pomerantz moved to Hollywood in 1974, where he found work writing in sitcoms, writing scripts for such shows as The Mary Tyler Moore Show, The Bob Newhart Show, and Taxi. By the 1980s, Pomerantz was developing and creating network television series, such as Major Dad, Family Man and Best of the West, and he continued to write scripts for Cheers, Newhart, and The Cosby Show. He won two Primetime Emmy Awards, a Writers Guild of America Award, the Humanitas Prize and a CableACE Award.

In the 2000s, he delivered several commentaries on NPR’s All Things Considered.
