= Michael Ironside filmography =

Performances by Canadian actor

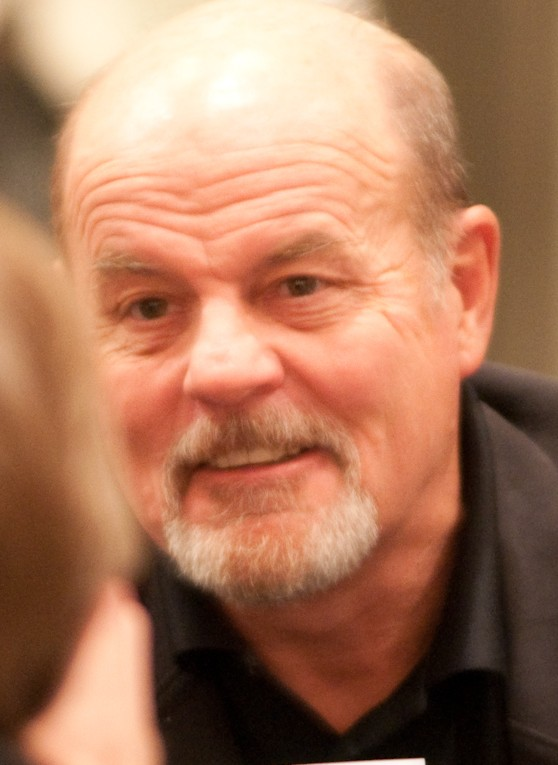
Ironside in 2009

The following is the filmography for Canadian actor Michael Ironside.

== Film ==
Year	Title	Role	Notes
1977	Outrageous!	Drunk	
1978	High-Ballin'	Butch	
1978	Power Play	Torturer	Uncredited
1979	Summer's Children	Pimp	
1979	Stone Cold Dead	Murdered Police Detective	
1980	Deadly Companion	Edgar	
1980	Suzanne	Jimmy	
1980	Coming Out Alive	Gateway	
1981	Scanners	Darryl Revok	
1981	Surfacing	Wayne	
1982	Best Revenge	Dealer	
1982	Visiting Hours	Colt Hawker	
1983	American Nightmare	Sergeant Skylar	
1983	Spacehunter: Adventures in the Forbidden Zone	"Overdog" McNabb	
1984	The Cap	Steve's Father	Short film
1984	The Surrogate	George Kyber	
1984	Terror in the Aisles	Darryl Revok	Documentary
1985	The Falcon and the Snowman	Lead FBI Agent	
1986	Jo Jo Dancer, Your Life Is Calling	Detective Lawrence	
1986	Top Gun	Lieutenant Commander Richard "Jester" Heatherly	
1987	Extreme Prejudice	Major Paul Hackett	
1987	Nowhere to Hide	Ben Cutter	
1987	Hello Mary Lou: Prom Night II	Principal Bill Nordham	
1988	Office Party	Larry Gaylord	AKA Hostile Takeover
1988	Watchers	Lem Johnson	
1990	Chaindance	J.T. Blake	Also screenwriter
1990	Total Recall	Agent Richter	
1991	Highlander II: The Quickening	General Katana	
1991	McBain	Frank Bruce	
1991	Neon City	Harry M. Stark	
1992	Guncrazy	Mr. Kincaid, Joy's Father	
1992	Killer Image	Luther Kane	
1992	Black Ice	Quinn	
1993	Point of Impact	Roberto Largo	AKA Spanish Rose
1993	Night Trap	Bishop	
1993	Free Willy	Dial	
1993	Father Hood	Jerry	
1994	Fortunes of War	Carl Pimmler	Direct-to-video
1994	Red Scorpion 2	Colonel West	
1994	The Killing Machine	Mr. Green	
1994	Red Sun Rising	Captain Meisler	Direct-to-video
1994	The Next Karate Kid	Colonel Dugan	
1994	The Glass Shield	Detective Gene Baker	
1995	Major Payne	Lieutenant Colonel Stone	
1995	Kids of the Round Table	Butch Scarsdale	
1995	Bolt	Billy Niles	Direct-to-video
1996	The Destiny of Marty Fine	Mr. Capelli	
1997	Chicago Cab	Al	AKA Hellcab
1997	Starship Troopers	Lieutenant Jean Rasczak	
1998	Captive	Detective Briscoe	
1998	Ivory Tower	Marshall Wallace	
1998	Going to Kansas City	Mike Malone	
1998	Desert Blue	Agent Frank Bellows	
1999	The Omega Code	Dominic	
2000	Heavy Metal 2000	Tyler	Voice
2000	The Perfect Storm	Bob Brown	
2000	Crime and Punishment in Suburbia	Fred Skolnick	
2001	Down	Gunter Steinberg	AKA The Shaft
2001	Children of the Corn: Revelation	The Priest	Direct-to-video
2001	Ignition	Jake Russo	
2001	Mindstorm	Senator Bill Armitage	
2001	Dead Awake	Skay	
2003	The Failures	Depressor	
2004	The Machinist	Miller	
2005	Reeker	Henry Tuckey	
2005	Deepwater	"Walnut"	
2005	Guy X	Guy X	
2008	The Alphabet Killer	Captain Nathan Norcross	
2008	Surveillance	Captain Billings	
2008	Mutants	Colonel Gauge	
2009	Terminator Salvation	General Hugh Ashdown	
2009	The Butcher	Teddy Carmichael	
2009	Hardwired	Hal	
2009	The Beacon	Officer Ned Hutton	
2010	The Bannen Way	Chief Bannen	
2010	Eva	Alfonse	
2010	Beneath the Blue	Blaine	
2011	X-Men: First Class	Captain of the 7th Fleet	
2012	All God's Children	Peter	
2013	Ice Soldiers	Colonel Desmond Trump	
2013	Stay	Frank	
2014	Extraterrestrial	Travis	
2014	A Fighting Man	Max Wynn	
2015	Synchronicity	Klaus Meisner	
2015	88	Sheriff Knowles	
2015	Turbo Kid	Zeus	
2016	Patient Seven	Dr. Daniel Marcus	
2016	The Space Between	Nick	
2017	Still/Born	Dr. Neilson	
2017	Lucky's Treasure	Henry Landis	
2018	Alterscape	Dr. Julian Loro	
2018	Knuckleball	Jacob	
2018	The Convent	The Magistrate	
2020	Bloodthirsty	Dr. Swan	
2020	Tin Can	Wayne	
2021	Nobody	Eddie Williams	
2022	Dracula: The Original Living Vampire	Dr. Jack Seward	
2023	BlackBerry	Charles Purdy	
2023	Late Night with the Devil	Narrator	Voice

== Television ==
Year	Title	Role	Notes
1978	For the Record	Policeman	Episode: "A Matter of Choice"
1979	The Littlest Hobo	Bill	Episode: "Silent Witness"
1979	The Family Man	The Bartender	Television film
1980	Coming Out Alive	Gateway	Television film
1983	The A-Team	Miler Crane	Episode: "The Taxi Cab Wars"
1983	Hill Street Blues	Schrader	Episode: "Midway to What?"
1984	V: The Final Battle	Ham Tyler	3 episodes
1984	Mickey Spillane's Mike Hammer	Wade Bennett	Episode: "Warpath"
1984–1985	V: The Series	Ham Tyler	13 episodes
1985	Murder in Space	Captain Neil Braddock	Television film
1985	The Hitchhiker	Sheriff Lee	Episode: "Dead Man's Curve"
1987	Alfred Hitchcock Presents	Lieutenant Rick Muldoon	Episode: "Man on the Edge"
1987	Race for the Bomb	Werner Heisenberg	2 episodes
1987	Ford: The Man and the Machine	Harry Bennett	Television film
1987	Danger Bay	Charles Fuller	Episode: "Pilot Error"
1988	The Ray Bradbury Theater	Acton	Episode: "The Fruit at the Bottom of the Bowl"
1989	Murder by Night	Lt. Carl Madsen	Television film
1990, 1994	Tales from the Crypt	Jerry, Burrows	2 episodes
1991	Deadly Surveillance	Detective Rick Fender	Television film
1994	Probable Cause	Gary Yanuck	Television film
1995	Singapore Sling: Road to Mandalay	Steiger	Television film
1995–2002	ER	Dr. William "Wild Willy" Swift	7 episodes
1995–1996	seaQuest 2032	Captain Oliver Hudson	13 episodes
1997	F/X: The Series	Montree	Episode: "Get Fast"
1997–2000	Superman: The Animated Series	Darkseid	Voice, 7 episodes
1998	Voyage of Terror	McBride	Television film
1998	The New Batman Adventures	1980s Batman	Voice, episode: "Legends of the Dark Knight"
1998	Witness to Yesterday	Vladimir Lenin	Episode: "Vladimir Lenin"
1999	Cold Squad	Chief Magnus Mulray	Episode: "Deadly Games: Part 1"
1999	The Outer Limits	Ambassador Prosser	Episode: "Summit"
2000	Nuremberg	Colonel Burton C. Andrus	1 episode
2000	Walker, Texas Ranger	Nolan "The Chairman" Pierce	4 episodes
2001	Mindstorm	Senator Bill Armitage	Television film
2001	Jett Jackson: The Movie	Dr. Kragg	Television film
2001	The Outer Limits	General Quince	Episode: "Rule of Law"
2002–2003	The Last Chapter	Bob Durelle	12 episodes
2002	The District	Dmitri Putin	2 episodes
2003–2004	Andromeda	The Patriarch	2 episodes
2003	Justice League	Darkseid	Voice, episode: "Twilight"
2004	Justice League Unlimited	Darkseid	Voice, 2 episodes
2004	Jackie Chan Adventures	Dragon Scout Leader	Voice, episode: "Dragon Scouts"
2004	Medical Investigation	Ben Graybridge	Episode: "Price of Pleasure"
2004–2010	Smallville	General Sam Lane	3 episodes
2005	Bloodsuckers	Muco	Television film
2005	Young Blades	Cardinal Mazarin	13 episodes
2005–2006	Desperate Housewives	Curtis Monroe	2 episodes
2006	Disaster Zone: Volcano in New York	Levering	Television film
2006	Stargate SG-1	Seevis	Episode: "Crusade"
2006	Masters of Horror	Mr. Chaney	Episode: "The V Word"
2006	The Veteran	Mark "Doc" Jordan	Television film
2008	Criminal Minds	John	Episode: "Elephant's Memory"
2008–2009	Wolverine and the X-Men	Colonel Moss / Dr. Brooks	Voice, 6 episodes
2009	Cold Case	Commandant Murillo	3 episodes
2010	Castle	Victor Racine	Episode: "Den of Thieves"
2010	Burn Notice	Gregory Hart	Episode: "Friends and Enemies"
2010	Lake Placid 3	Sheriff Tony Willinger	Television film
2012	Justified	Sarno	Episode: "Measures"
2012	The Haunting Hour: The Series	Margolin	2 episodes
2012	Community	Lieutenant Colonel Norbert Archwood	Episode: "Basic Lupine Urology"
2013	Vegas	Porter Gainsley	4 episodes
2013	Transformers: Prime	Ultra Magnus	Voice, 9 episodes
2013	Transformers Prime Beast Hunters: Predacons Rising	Ultra Magnus	Voice, television film
2014	Stan Lee's Mighty 7	Xanar	Voice, television film
2014	Rake	Victor	Episode: "Three Strikes"
2015	The Flash	Lewis Snart	Episode: "Family of Rogues"
2016	Tokyo Trial	General Douglas MacArthur	4 episodes
2016	Teenage Mutant Ninja Turtles	Emperor Zanmoran	Voice, episode: "The Arena of Carnage"
2018	The Alienist	J. P. Morgan	4 episodes
2018	This Is Us	Grandpa Pearson	Episode: "Vietnam"
2019	Hawaii Five-0	Robert Castor	Episode: "E'ao lu'au a kualima"
2020–2023	Harley Quinn	Darkseid	Voice, 4 episodes
2021	Hidden Assets	Richard Melnick	6 episodes
2022	The Dropout	Don Lucas	4 episodes
2022	Pumpkin Everything	Tom	Television film
2022–2023	Barry	Andrei	2 episodes

== Video games ==
Year	Title	Role	Notes
2002	Run Like Hell	Commander Mason	
2002	Tom Clancy's Splinter Cell	Sam Fisher	
2004	Tom Clancy's Splinter Cell: Pandora Tomorrow	Sam Fisher	
2005	Tom Clancy's Splinter Cell: Chaos Theory	Sam Fisher	
2006	Tom Clancy's Splinter Cell: Essentials	Sam Fisher	
2006	Tom Clancy's Splinter Cell: Double Agent	Sam Fisher	
2007	TimeShift	Dr. Krone	
2007	Command & Conquer 3: Tiberium Wars	General Jack Granger	
2010	Tom Clancy's Splinter Cell: Conviction	Sam Fisher	
2018	Tom Clancy's Ghost Recon: Wildlands	Sam Fisher	
2018	Lego DC Super-Villains	Darkseid	
2020	Tom Clancy's Ghost Recon Breakpoint	Sam Fisher	
