= The Merry Wives of Tobias Rouke =

1972 Canadian film

- Directed by: John Board
- Written by: George Mendeluk; Arthur Slabotsky
- Produced by: John Board; Stan Feldman; Samuel C. Jephcott
- Starring: Henry Beckman; Paul Bradley; Linda Sorenson; Judith Gault
- Cinematography: Paul Van der Linden
- Edited by: Alan Collins; Rick Madden
- Music by: Terry Bush
- Production company: Bellevue-Pathé
- Release date: 1972
- Running time: 95 minutes
- Country: Canada
- Language: English

The Merry Wives of Tobias Rouke is a Canadian comedy film, directed by John Board and released in 1972. A historical comedy set in the 1850s, the film stars Henry Beckman as Tobias Rouke, a farmer whose wife Holly (Linda Sorenson) is away at the hospital being treated for amnesia, and Paul Bradley as Laslow, a travelling snake oil salesman who comes to town and talks Tobias into marrying his assistant Fancy (Judith Gault), only for the scheme to be thrown into disarray when Holly unexpectedly comes home from the hospital.

The supporting cast also included Earl Pomerantz, Ratch Wallace, Monica Parker, Samuel Jephcott and Guy Sanvido.

The film was shot principally in Kleinburg, Ontario, with some additional location shooting at Black Creek Pioneer Village and the Clairville Conservation Area.

The film was entered into competition at the 24th Canadian Film Awards, but was so poorly received that even some of the jury walked out of the screening. Producer Stan Feldman subsequently tried to salvage the film by adding newly shot Sex scenes to it so that he could market it as a sex comedy.
