= Double Up (Canadian game show) =

- Genre: Quiz show
- Presented by: Hart Pomerantz
- Country of origin: Canada
- Original language: English
- No. of seasons: 1

Production
- Producers: Jack Budgell; Danny Finkleman
- Running time: 30 minutes

Original release
- Network: CBC Television
- Release: 1 July – 5 October 1974

Double Up is a Canadian quiz show that aired on CBC Television in 1974.

== Premise ==
This quiz show drew comparisons to the American series You Bet Your Life. It was hosted by Hart Pomerantz, a panelist of CBC series This Is the Law which Double Up replaced between seasons.

In each episode, three pairs of contestants responded to quiz questions during the game. One of the pairs had an opportunity to double their cash prize towards the end of the show.

== Scheduling ==
This half-hour series was broadcast on Mondays at 9:30 p.m. (Eastern) from 1 July to 2 September 1974, then for two final Saturday episodes at 6:30 p.m. on 28 September and 5 October 1974.
