= Cayle Chernin =

Canadian actress, writer, and producer

- Born: Cayle Vivian Chernin; December 4, 1947; Cape Breton Island, Nova Scotia, Canada
- Died: February 18, 2011 (aged 63); Toronto, Ontario, Canada
- Resting place: Pardes Chaim Cemetery, Vaughan, Ontario, Canada
- Occupations: Actress, producer, writer
- Years active: 1970–2011

Cayle Vivian Chernin (December 4, 1947 – February 18, 2011) was a Canadian actress, writer, and producer born in Glace Bay, on Cape Breton Island, Nova Scotia. She began her career with a small, but important, role in Donald Shebib's Canadian film Goin' Down the Road (1970). She later produced award-winning documentaries, and acted in film, television and theatre; when she returned to acting in the 2000s, having become better known as a filmmaker she initially used the stage names Cayle-Lorraine Sinclair or Lorraine Sinclair in her acting roles, before reverting back to Cayle Chernin in the late 2000s.

Chernin had ovarian cancer which was rapidly spreading, but she died of a virus she caught in the hospital on February 18, 2011, at the age of 63. Diagnosed in June 2010, she filmed a sequel to Goin' Down the Road titled Down the Road Again, in October 2010. The film was theatrically released posthumously in October 2011. Co-star Jayne Eastwood stated that Chernin put off cancer treatment in order to complete the film. Contrary to Eastwood's quote, when Cayle Chernin was diagnosed, she rejected chemotherapy, embarking on alternative cancer treatments during the course of her illness. Chernin resided in Toronto, Ontario at the time of her death.

== Filmography ==
Year	Title	Role	Notes
1970	Goin' Down the Road	Selina	
1970	Love in a Four Letter World	Sam	
1972	Dealing: Or the Berkeley-to-Boston Forty-Brick Lost-Bag Blues	Raymonde	
1976	Tracks	Train passenger	
1978	Sidestreet		One episode
1978	King of Kensington		One episode
1986	Baraba		
1987	Concrete Angels	Mrs. Levinson	
1991	The Graveyard Story	Miss Bloor	
1992	A Town Torn Apart	Gladys	
1998	Exhibit A: Secrets of Forensic Science	Bernadette Belanger	One episode
2000	Passengers	Grandmother	
2001	What Makes a Family	ICU nurse	
2002	Not a Fish Story	Rose Mattersal	
2003	Rhinoceros Eyes	Waitress	
2004	Queer as Folk	Katherine	One episode
2005	Family Practice	Mom	
2005	The Fool		
2005	Leo	Florence	
2005	Lie with Me		
2006	Car Lady & Bike Girl	Car Lady	
2007	Little Mosque on the Prairie	Hallowe'en mom	One episode
2007	The Birthday	Diana	
2008	The Princess of Selkirk Avenue	Rose	
2008	Of Murder and Memory	Mrs. Miller	
2011	Single White Spenny	Ida	One episode
2011	Down the Road Again	Selma	
