= The Hard Part Begins =

- Directed by: Paul Lynch
- Written by: John Hunter
- Produced by: John Hunter; Derrett Lee
- Starring: Donnelly Rhodes; Paul Bradley; Nancy Belle Fuller; Linda Sorenson; Doug McGrath; Les Carlson
- Cinematography: Robert Saad
- Edited by: William Gray
- Music by: Ian Guenther
- Distributed by: Cinépix
- Release dates: October 1973 (Filmexpo, Ottawa); September 20, 1974 (Toronto); November 22, 1974 (Montreal)
- Running time: 86 minutes
- Country: Canada
- Language: English
- Budget: $95,000 (estimated)

The Hard Part Begins is a 1973 Canadian feature film that marked the directorial debut of Paul Lynch, starring Donnelly Rhodes and Linda Sorenson.

== Plot ==
“King and Country” is a country and western group headed by a 40-something singer, Jim King, whose girlfriend, Jenny, is a backup singer with the band. They have been playing one-week stints in small-town bars in southwestern Ontario. They are appearing in King's fictional hometown of West Eden when he hears news that a recording company wants to talk to him. His past collides with his future when he reconnects with his bitter ex-wife, a troubled son and a dying friend who all have shared shattered dreams of success. King learns the company is interested in Jenny, not him, and he has to return to the road and accept his fate.

== Production ==
Director Paul Lynch independently raised $40,000 and received a $60,000 loan from the Canadian Film Development Corporation (CFDC) to finance the film.

== Reception ==
Alistair Brown wrote in Cinema Canada that The Hard Part Begins made "a fine directorial debut for Paul Lynch," though he wished it could have been more ambitious. Motion praised Donnelly Rhodes's performance and "hayseed machismo".

Despite playing almost exclusively in theaters in Canada, the film made a solid profit.
