= Hart Pomerantz =

Canadian lawyer, writer and television personality

- Education: University of Toronto Faculty of Law (LL.B., 1965)
- Occupations: Lawyer; Writer; Television personality
- Known for: The Hart and Lorne Terrific Hour; This Is the Law
- Relatives: Earl Pomerantz (brother)

Hart Pomerantz is a Canadian lawyer, writer and television personality. He is best known for his collaboration with Lorne Michaels on the CBC comedy series The Hart and Lorne Terrific Hour and for his appearances as a regular panelist on This Is the Law. He also hosted the 1974 quiz show Double Up and the 1998 talk show Grumps.

== Early life and legal career ==
Pomerantz graduated from the University of Toronto Faculty of Law in 1965. During law school he developed an interest in observational humour and comedy writing. Following graduation, he practised criminal law in Toronto for more than a decade before moving into civil litigation, concentrating primarily on employment-related matters. He retired from legal practice in 2022.

== Entertainment career ==
While establishing his legal career, Pomerantz also pursued comedy and broadcasting. At the University of Toronto, he met fellow student Lorne Lipowitz, later known professionally as Lorne Michaels. According to Pomerantz, Michaels saw him performing comedy and monologues at university and later telephoned him at his law office to ask if he wanted to go into show business with him.

The two became writing partners and eventually moved to Los Angeles, where they wrote material for Rowan & Martin's Laugh-In and comedians including Phyllis Diller, Joan Rivers and Woody Allen. Pomerantz also represented Michaels when he legally changed his surname from Lipowitz to Michaels.

Returning to Canada, Pomerantz and Michaels created and starred in The Hart and Lorne Terrific Hour, a CBC sketch-comedy and variety series that aired from 1970 to 1971. The programme featured performers including Dan Aykroyd, Andrea Martin, Victor Garber, Jayne Eastwood and Jackie Burroughs, as well as musical guests such as James Taylor, Cat Stevens and Murray McLauchlan.

Pomerantz subsequently became well known to Canadian television audiences as a regular panelist on This Is the Law, a legal-themed panel game in which participants watched dramatizations of unusual laws and attempted to identify the statute involved. He later hosted Double Up in 1974 and the short-lived talk show Grumps in 1998.

In a 2012 profile for TVO, broadcaster Steve Paikin described Pomerantz as "a man of many careers" and highlighted his ability to combine a successful legal practice with comedy, television and writing.

== Writing ==
Beginning in the 2010s, Pomerantz gained a new audience through humorous essays published in The New Yorker. Many of these pieces take the form of fictionalized autobiographical reminiscences by historical figures.

=== Selected writings ===
- Sigmund Freud: The Untold Story (2018)
- Einstein: The Untold Story (2020)

== Personal life ==
His younger brother, Earl Pomerantz, was a television writer and producer known for his work on American situation comedies.
