= Wedding in White =

- Directed by: William Fruet
- Written by: William Fruet
- Based on: The Wedding in White by William Fruet
- Produced by: John Vidette
- Starring: Carol Kane; Donald Pleasence; Doris Petrie; Doug McGrath; Paul Bradley
- Cinematography: Richard Leiterman
- Edited by: Tony Lower; Edwin Watkins
- Music by: Milan Kymlicka
- Production companies: Cinépix Film Properties; Dermet
- Distributed by: Cinépix Film Properties
- Release date: October 20, 1972
- Running time: 103 minutes
- Country: Canada
- Language: English

Wedding in White is a 1972 Canadian drama film written and directed by William Fruet, adapted from his stage play of the same name, and starring Carol Kane, Donald Pleasence, Doris Petrie, Doug McGrath, and Paul Bradley. Set in 1940s Ontario, the film follows a teenage girl whose father attempts to protect their family's reputation after she becomes pregnant following a rape by her brother's friend.

Fruet's play The Wedding in White was originally conceived as a script for television, but ultimately was given its debut at the Poor Alex Theatre in Toronto in 1970. The film version was released two years later.

== Synopsis ==
Set during World War II, in a small Ontario community, the film stars Carol Kane as Jeannie Dougall, a teenager who is raped by Billy (Doug McGrath), a friend of her brother Jimmie's (Paul Bradley), while the two men are home on furlough. She subsequently struggles against the harsh and cruel reaction of her parents Jim and Mary (Donald Pleasence and Doris Petrie) when she discovers that the incident has left her pregnant; Jim's proposed solution to the dilemma is to marry Jeannie off to Sandy (Leo Phillips), an old army friend of his who is in his 60s.

The play and film were inspired by a real woman Fruet met in his youth, who had been forced to marry an older man by her parents in the same circumstances.

== Cast ==
- Donald Pleasence as Jim Dougall, Sr.
- Carol Kane as Jeannie Dougall
- Doris Petrie as Mary Dougall
- Leo Phillips as Sandy
- Paul Bradley as Jimmie Dougall
- Doug McGrath as Billy
- Christine Thomas as Sarah McCarver
- Bonnie Carol Case as Dolly

== Reception ==
In a 1973 review for the Chicago Sun-Times, Roger Ebert awarded the film four stars out of four, praising the film's cast and writing that, "We don’t feel we’re being told a story; it’s more like we’re glimpsing the small joys and tragedies of unfortunate relatives. The movie, which won the Canadian film festival, works so well, I think, because the performances are good; this material could never stand being fancied up by overacting." He compared the film's attention to detail to that of Peter Bogdanovich's 1971 drama The Last Picture Show, and likened its portrayal of a character study to Mike Leigh's directorial debut, the 1971 comedy drama Bleak Moments. For The New York Times, Vincent Canby also complimented the film's cast, as well as its period-accurate dialogue, stating, "It is a closely observed chronicle of one family's life, moving and funny and a little scary, full of unexpected stoicism and the kind of boozy jocularity that can suddenly erupt into violence."

== Awards ==
Wedding in White and Réjeanne Padovani were the only two Canadian films screened at the 1973 Cannes Film Festival.

The film won the Canadian Film Award for Best Feature Film in 1972.

It was later screened at the 1984 Festival of Festivals as part of Front & Centre, a special retrospective program of artistically and culturally significant films from throughout the history of Canadian cinema.
