= Goin' Down the Road =

- Promotional movie poster for the film
- Directed by: Donald Shebib
- Written by: William Fruet; Donald Shebib
- Produced by: Donald Shebib
- Starring: Doug McGrath; Paul Bradley; Jayne Eastwood; Cayle Chernin
- Cinematography: Richard Leiterman
- Edited by: Donald Shebib
- Music by: Bruce Cockburn
- Production company: Evdon Films
- Distributed by: Chevron Pictures
- Release dates: 2 July 1970 (Canada); 19 October 1970 (U.S.)
- Running time: 90 minutes
- Country: Canada
- Language: English
- Budget: $85,000
- Box office: $300,000

Goin' Down the Road is a 1970 Canadian drama film directed by Donald Shebib and co-written by Shebib and William Fruet. It tells the story of two young men who decide to leave the Maritimes, where jobs and fulfilling lives are hard to find, for the excitement and perceived riches of Toronto. It stars Doug McGrath, Paul Bradley, Jayne Eastwood and Cayle Chernin. Despite the small production budget, the movie is generally regarded as one of the best and most influential Canadian films of all time and has received considerable critical acclaim for its writing, directing and acting.

== Plot ==
Pete and Joey drive their 1960 Chevrolet Impala from their home on Cape Breton Island in Nova Scotia to Toronto with the hope of meeting up with their relatives in the city who might be able to help them find jobs; but their relatives hide from what they see as the pair's uncouth behaviour and the two are set adrift in the city. The men find jobs at a local ginger-ale bottler for $80 per week, a job with tough working conditions that doesn't pay much better than what they could have had back home. They fill their days smoking, drinking beer, and hitting on young women along Toronto's busy Yonge Street strip.

They soon turn their good fortune into residency in a small apartment, which they decorate with centrefolds from men's magazines and movie posters. Both men start romances; Joey decides to get married when his girlfriend, Betty (Jayne Eastwood), becomes pregnant. With his new wife he pursues a credit-driven lifestyle undreamt of back home, buying a new colour television, stereo, and furniture all on an installment plan.

Disaster strikes when Pete and Joey get laid off at the end of the summer and the trio are forced to move to a smaller, less-comfortable apartment. Pete and Joey find new jobs washing cars and resetting pins in a bowling alley but at much smaller wages than what they received at the bottling factory. Tensions mount at the crowded living situation and the lack of money begins to wear on them, and Betty tells Joey she will soon need to stop working at her waitressing job because of her pregnancy. Pete accuses Joey of not making enough money to support his share of the costs, and Betty resents Pete for making the accusation.

Unable to find steady work and with bills to pay and Joey and Betty's baby on the way, Pete and Joey resort to stealing food from a local supermarket. The caper results in a grocery clerk being assaulted by the pair when he tries to prevent the robbery. Pete and Joey return to their apartment in the morning to find Betty gone and their possessions on the street, after the police came in search of them and their landlord evicted them as troublemakers.

Broke, homeless, wanted by the police for theft and assault, and with Betty staying with her aunt and uncle, the pair decide to pawn the rented colour TV set for money in order to make it out to Western Canada. Pete convinces Joey that husbands leave their wives "all the time" and Joey agrees to leave Betty and her unborn child in Toronto, as she will slow them down. The film concludes much as it began, with Pete and Joey driving west in search of greener pastures.

== Cast ==
- Doug McGrath as Peter McGraw
- Paul Bradley as Joey Mayle
- Jayne Eastwood as Betty
- Cayle Chernin as Selina
- Nicole Morin as Nicole
- Pierre La Roche as "Frenchie" La Roche
- Don Steinhouse as Plant Co-worker
- Ted Sugar as Plant Co-worker
- Ron Martin as Plant Co-worker

== Production ==
Goin' Down the Road was initially pitched to the Canadian Broadcasting Corporation as The Maritimers, a television drama. Donald Shebib received a $19,000 grant from the Canadian Film Development Corporation. The film was made on a budget of $85,000 (equivalent to $687,537 in 2025).

== Release ==
The film opened at the New Yorker theater in Toronto and played for 22 weeks, a record for a Canadian film.

== Reception ==
The film earned $150,000 (equivalent to $1,213,300 in 2025) at the box office in its first two months. After 5 months of release in Canada, it had grossed $300,000.

The New York Times stated that the film was "the most impressive new work of realist cinema in years." The film won the award for Best Feature Film at the 22nd Canadian Film Awards; McGrath and Bradley also jointly won the award for Best Actor.

== Legacy ==
This film has been designated and preserved as a "masterwork" by the Audio-Visual Preservation Trust of Canada, a charitable non-profit organization dedicated to promoting the preservation of Canada's audio-visual heritage. The Toronto International Film Festival ranked it in the Top 10 Canadian Films of All Time four times, in 1984, 1993, 2004 and 2015. The National Gallery of Canada featured Goin' Down the Road as one of seven films for an exhibition to mark the 25th anniversary of Telefilm Canada in 1992. Canada Post created postage stamps featuring ten films, including Goin' Down the Road, to mark the 100th anniversary of Canadian cinema in 1996. In 2002, readers of Playback voted it the 5th greatest Canadian film of all-time.

In 2010, Shebib announced that a sequel film was in production. Down the Road Again was released in October 2011.

A digital restoration of the original Goin' Down the Road was released in 2017.

== Works cited ==
- Melnyk, George (2004). One Hundred Years of Canadian Cinema. University of Toronto Press. ISBN 0802084443.
- Walz, Eugene, ed. (2002). Canada’s Best Features: Critical essays on 15 Canadian films. Brill Publishers. ISBN 978-94-012-0014-1.
