= Down the Road Again =

2011 film

- Film poster
- Directed by: Donald Shebib
- Written by: Donald Shebib
- Produced by: Robin Cass
- Starring: Doug McGrath; Kathleen Robertson; Anthony Lemke; Cayle Chernin
- Cinematography: François Dagenais
- Edited by: Susan Maggi
- Production companies: Triptych Media; Union Pictures
- Release date: 21 October 2011
- Running time: 84 minutes
- Country: Canada
- Language: English
- Budget: C$2,000,000

Down the Road Again is a 2011 Canadian drama film written and directed by Donald Shebib. The film is the sequel to Shebib's 1970 film Goin' Down the Road.

== Plot ==
Forty years after the events of Goin' Down the Road, Joey has died in Vancouver and Pete—who left Toronto with Joey after a violent incident—must return to the city to honour Joey's request that his ashes be taken back to Cape Breton Island. Betty-Jo, Joey and Betty's daughter, joins him in the journey, driving cross-Canada in the same 1960 Chevy Impala convertible that Joey and Pete used when they left home in 1970. Adding to the emotion of the trip, the Cape Breton homecoming turns out to be a surprising final gift to Pete from Joey. Pete reconnects with Betty, Selina, a special woman named Annie, and learns about Annie's son, Matt.

== Cast ==
- Doug McGrath as Pete McGraw
- Kathleen Robertson as Betty-Jo Mayle
- Anthony Lemke as Matt Burns
- Jayne Eastwood as Betty Mayle
- Cayle Chernin as Selina
- Tedde Moore as Annie Burns
- Kristin Adams as Secretary
- John Cleland as Sammy
- Elva Mai Hoover as Housekeeper

== Production ==
According to Donald Shebib, until 2007, he had been reluctant to do a sequel to Goin' Down the Road, despite people asking him about it for years. "Finally a producer, a different producer than I actually ended up with, offered to try and help put it together. So I thought that if somebody professional was going to try and do it, then let me sit down and try and find a story that makes some sense. And it came together surprisingly easily."

According to Jayne Eastwood, Cayle Chernin was a strong advocate convincing director Shebib to make this sequel to his 1970 film. When Chernin was diagnosed with ovarian cancer in June 2010, she chose to forgo standard cancer treatments to stay active enough to reprise her Selina character. Chernin did not tell anyone among the cast or crew that she knew she had terminal cancer when they were filming, though McGrath had his suspicions: "She was so thin. There was a frailty I hadn't seen before." Chernin died on 18 February 2011, three months after the project wrapped up in October 2010.

=== Writing ===
Shebib considered the script better than the original's. Doug McGrath said that when he first read Shebib's script, "it was like reading my own history. I figured Pete had gone through a lot."

=== Filming ===
Down the Road Again was shot with a "thirty or forty man crew". The film was shot in 18 days for "just $2 million", largely in Toronto, with Cherry Beach serving as the Atlantic Ocean as Joey's ashes are scattered. It was shot in 35mm (unlike the 16mm of the original) with a full crew and a more composed style than the original, which is seen in flashbacks. It was completed in October 2010.

== Critical response ==
Greg Klymkiw called Down the Road Again "a deeply moving and funny sequel that works as a continuation to a movie beloved by so many Canadians, but also works if one has never seen the original." Writing for the National Post, Chris Knight gave the film 3 stars: "Down the Road Again isn't all that good, but it is a charming little story provided you don't hold it up against its predecessor," and, as a point of comparison, it "isn't on the same level as such where-are-they-nows as Before Sunrise/Before Sunset, but it is an effective story about loves lost, possibilities squandered, and the ability to look the past square in the face and live with it." Stephen Cole gave the film 2.5 stars out of 4: "If Shebib's original seemed a draining neighbourhood experience, the 2011 follow-up comes off as canny entertainment. ... Robertson and McGrath enjoy a feisty comic rapport. And the film showcases Shebib's greatest storytelling talent – a tender honesty that brings characters alive." He finds some scenes not convincing, "including the feel-good ending." Brian Johnson said that the "sequel does not recapture the magic" of the original, adding "How could it?", but, speaking of lead McGrath, admired how "the wry, wistful resignation of his performance—intercut with glimpses of the young Pete, dumb and wild with the wind in his hair—speaks volumes." Norman Wilner, giving the film the equivalent of 1 star out of 5, branded the film "a wheezy, flat and unnecessary follow-up that tries in the clumsiest way imaginable to slap a happy ending on the first film's downbeat story." He thought Kathleen Robertson brought "some energy", but that "Shebib's script is only interested in her symbolic function", concluding: "it's all such a waste."

In a 2018 review, Shaun Lang disagrees that the sequel does not do justice to the original film: "Don Shebib and company are more than up to the task," and the film "superbly meshes an older generation with a new one." Assigning the film a 7.5/10, he says McGrath is in fine form, and "Kathleen Robertson commands her screen time well as McGrath's new onscreen partner", conceding "it may veer dangerously close to cookie cutter TV-movie territory at times".
