= Paul Bradley (Canadian actor) =

Canadian actor

- Publicity photo for Goin' Down the Road
- Born: September 2, 1940
- Died: September 1, 2003 (aged 62); Victoria, British Columbia, Canada
- Occupation: Actor

Paul Bradley (September 2, 1940 – September 1, 2003) was a Canadian actor, best known for his role as Joey in the classic Canadian film Goin' Down the Road.

Bradley and his Goin' Down the Road co-star Doug McGrath were jointly named the winners of the Canadian Film Award for Best Actor in 1970. Goin' Down the Road director Donald Shebib made a documentary film about him for CBC Television's Telescope, titled Born Hustler.

His other acting credits included the television series This Is the Law, The Hart and Lorne Terrific Hour and The Whiteoaks of Jalna, as well as the films The Merry Wives of Tobias Rouke, Wedding in White, Springhill and Lions for Breakfast.

Bradley died in 2003 in Victoria, British Columbia.
