= Colin Fox (actor) =

Canadian actor (1938–2025)

- Born: November 20, 1938; Aldershot, Ontario, Canada
- Died: April 5, 2025 (aged 86); Fergus, Ontario, Canada
- Other name: Colin R. Fox
- Education: University of Western Ontario; National Theatre School of Canada
- Occupation: Actor
- Years active: 1963–2024
- Spouse: Carol Fox (m. 1986; died 2015)
- Children: 1 stepdaughter

Colin R. Fox (November 20, 1938 – April 5, 2025) was a Canadian actor, who appeared in various Canadian and American films and television series. His best known roles included Jean Paul Desmond / Jacques Eloi Des Mondes on Strange Paradise (1969–70), Professor Anton Hendricks on PSI Factor: Chronicles of the Paranormal (1996–2000), and Fritz Brenner on A Nero Wolfe Mystery (2001–02).

Fox also provided voiceover work for animated projects like The Legend of Zelda (1989), Rupert (1991–97), X-Men: The Animated Series (1996), and Atomic Betty (2004–08). The latter earned him a Gemini Award for Best Performance in an Animated Program or Series.

== Career ==
His acting credits included playing Jean Paul Desmond and Jacques Eloi Des Mondes (the latter speaking to his descendant from the portrait) in Strange Paradise (CBC/Syndicated, 1969–70), as well as voice work in various animated series, and in other roles in film, television and on the stage. He created the role of Walter Telford, an attorney on the series High Hopes. His most famous role may be that of Anton Hendricks in the TV series PSI Factor: Chronicles of the Paranormal. He also appeared in Shining Time Station episode, "Schemer's Special Club", as the misogynistic and racist Nicklear Club President and owner Mr. Hobart Hume III.

Fox was well known for his portrayal of Swiss chef Fritz Brenner in the A&E TV original series, A Nero Wolfe Mystery (2001–2002), and the series pilot, The Golden Spiders: A Nero Wolfe Mystery (2000). Fox's Fritz is a complex person, like the Fritz portrayed in the books, but does not joke with Archie as much. A running joke in the series is the offscreen sound of pots and pans falling and dishes breaking when Fritz is annoyed or upset. In "Eeny Meeny Murder Mo", Fritz gets drunk after a woman is murdered in Wolfe's office and Wolfe refuses to eat.

Fox played cunning, ruthless villains in three episodes of the Canadian TV show Friday the 13th: The Series. The first was monk Rupert LeCroix in "The Poisoned Pen" wielding a cursed quill pen that caused whatever was written by it to actually happen. The second was Sylvan Winters, taxidermist and Satanic Cult leader – who actually killed lead character, Micki Foster (Louise Robey) with the deadly Coin of Zaecles in the episode, "Tails I Live, Heads You Die." The third was German scientist Horst Mueller in "The Butcher," who used a silver amulet – a swastika enclosed in a circle – to resurrect a Nazi war criminal, Colonel Rausch a.k.a. The Butcher.

He also supplied the voice of the Professor in Rupert, the archvillain The Wizard in The Care Bears Adventure in Wonderland and Newton the turtle from Peep and the Big Wide World.

== Personal life and death ==
Fox was born in Aldershot, Ontario, Canada on November 20, 1938. He was a 1965 graduate of the National Theatre School of Canada. He was married to Carol Bermingham-Fox, and was the stepfather to her daughter, Sarah, from a previous marriage. Carol predeceased him, dying of cancer in 2015. He lived in Elora, Ontario, 100 km from Toronto, in an 1860s Victorian home.

Fox died in Fergus, Ontario on April 5, 2025, at the age of 86.

== Filmography ==
=== Film ===
Colin Fox film credits
Year	Title	Role	Notes
1963	Again and Again	Narrator	
1969	The Three Musketeers	Aramis	
1969	Strange Paradise	Jean Paul Desmond / Jacques Eloi Des Monde	
1971	The Reincarnate	Ormsby	
1975	My Pleasure Is My Business	Freddie	
1979	Chocolate Eclair (Éclair au chocolat)	Le businessman américain	
1980	Virus	Spy Z	
1981	Silence of the North	Arthur Herriot	
1982	Murder by Phone	Dr. Alderman	
1983	A Christmas Story	Ming the Merciless	Scenes deleted
1984	Covergirl	Maitre d'	
1984	Real Inside	Arthur Mudgin	Short
1987	The Care Bears Adventure in Wonderland	The Wizard (voice)	
1987	Hello Again	Clergyman	
1989	Gnaw: Food of the Gods II	Professor Edmond Delhurst	
1990	Beautiful Dreamers	Rev. Haines	
1991	Money	1st Executive	
1992	Scanners III: The Takeover	Dr. Elton Monet	
1993	On My Own	Palter	
1994	PCU	Trustee #1	
1994	Historica Minutes: Agnes Macphail	Hugh Guthrie	Short
1995	Butterbox Babies	Rutledge	
1995	Open Season	Jackson Carp	
1995	Tommy Boy	Nelson	
1995	Voices	Sir Thomas Beecham	
1996	Mrs. Winterbourne	Wedding Guest	
1996	Daylight	Roger Trilling	
1996	In Love and War	Dr. Hemingway	
1996	L5: First City in Space	Scientist-Grandfather	Short
1998	Seeds of Doubt	David Golden	
2000	Thomas and the Magic Railroad	Henry	Voice, original workprints only
2000	Left Behind: The Movie	Chaim Rosenzweig	
2001	Chasing Holden	Pappy	
2001	Down to Earth	Director	
2002	Drummer Boy	Board Chairman	
2004	Perfect Strangers	Sir Nigel	
2008	One Week	Father O'Neill	
2008	Cutting for Stone	Chairman	
2019	The Women of Aipine Road	Morgan	Short
2020	Shortly to Go	Cloves	Short
2021	Hero Dog: The Journey Home	Captain Boggs	
2023	Deadly Draw	Silas Ekelund	
2024	Return to Wickensburg	Professor McAuliffe	Final role

=== Television ===
Colin Fox television credits
Year	Title	Role	Notes
1974	House of Pride	Dan Pride	1 episode
1975	Witness to Yesterday	John George Lambton, 1st Earl of Durham	Episode: "Lord Durham"
1977	The War Between the Tates	Leonard Zimmerman	Television film
1978	The Prophet from Pugwash	Narrator	CBC TV documentary
1978	High Hopes	Walter Telford	1 episode
1979	A Man Called Intrepid	Acker	TV miniseries
1985	The Equalizer	Consul	Episode: "The Defector"
1986	The Equalizer	Bishop	Episode: "The Cup"
1986	My Pet Monster	Professor (voice)	
1986	Spenser: For Hire	Father Brendan	Episode: "Shadowsight"
1987–1988	Alfred Hitchcock Presents	Victor Stouts; Dr. Herman Vandenburg	2 episodes
1987–1989	Friday the 13th: The Series	Le Croix; Sylvan Winters; Horst Mueller	3 episodes
1987–1990	Street Legal	Dr. Peter Marcheson; Lowell McMurrich	2 episodes
1988	Biographies: The Enigma of Bobby Bittman	Arthur Prince	Television film
1989	The Legend of Zelda	King Harkinian (voice)	Main cast
1989	Passion and Paradise	Axel Wenner-Gren	Television film
1989	Small Sacrifices	Jim Pex	TV miniseries
1989	Lady in the Corner	Theo	Television film
1990	Counterstrike	Lord Sutcliffe	Episode: "Art for Art's Sake"
1990	In Defense of a Married Man	Brad Monroe	Television film
1990	Descending Angel	Doctor	Television film
1990–1992	Maniac Mansion	Edward Edison	4 episodes
1991	Law & Order	Peter Martin	Episode: "In Memory Of"
1991	Mark Twain and Me	Dr. Quintard	Television film
1991	A Little Piece of Heaven	The Preacher	Television film
1991	Conspiracy of Silence	George Dangerfield	TV miniseries
1991–1997	Rupert	Professor	18 episodes
1992	E.N.G.	Sandy Ferguson	Episode: "Pressure"
1992	Deadbolt	Professor Rhodes	Television film
1992	In the Eyes of a Stranger	Richard	Television film
1992	The Sound and the Silence	Samuel Langley	Television film
1992	Partners 'n Love	Dr. Hatch	Television film
1992, 1995	Forever Knight	Priest; Dr. Alex Nystrom	2 episodes
1993	Shining Time Station	Hobart Hume The Third	Episode: "Schemer's Special Club"
1993	Dieppe	Laffin	Television film
1993	Road to Avonlea	Galileo Dale	Episode: "Tug of War"
1993	Bonds of Love	Dr. Roche	Television film
1993	Woman on the Run: The Lawrencia Bembenek Story	Joe Bembenek	Television film
1993	Matrix	The Man from the Other Side	Episode: "The Yellow Chamber"
1993	Return to Lonesome Dove	Lord Henry	TV miniseries
1994	Kung Fu: The Legend Continues	Felson	Episode: "Temple"
1994	The Mighty Jungle	Harold	Episode: "Guerrilla in My Midst"
1994	RoboCop: The Series	Hammersmith (voice)	Episode: "Sisters in Crime"
1994	Blauvogel	Priest	TV miniseries
1994–1996	Highlander: The Animated Series	Cubert (voice)	TV series
1995	The Neverending Story	Large Head (voice)	9 episodes
1995	Hiroshima	James Forrestal	Television film
1995	Ray Lawson	Episode: "The Tale of Train Magic"	
1995–1996	Goosebumps	Shopkeeper	2 episodes
1996	X-Men: The Animated Series	Purple Man (voice)	Episode: "No Mutant Is an Island"
1996	Windsor Protocol	FBI Agent James K. Smith	Television film
1996	The Adventures of Shirley Holmes	Mr. Howie	8 episodes
1996	Sins of Silence	Judge Boland	Television film
1996	The Haunting of Lisa	Bishop McCarthy	Television film
1996	Captive Heart: The James Mink Story	Lord Elgin	Television film
1996–2000	PSI Factor: Chronicles of the Paranormal	Professor Anton Hedricks	Canadian TV series
1997	Elvis Meets Nixon	Sir Harold	Television film
1997	End of Summer	Ezra	Television film
1997	Let Me Call You Sweetheart	State Senator Jonathan Hoover	Television film
1998	Silver Surfer	Uatu the Watcher (voice)	3 episodes
1998–1999	Mythic Warriors: Guardians of the Legend	King Cepheus, Menelaus (voice)	2 episodes
1999	Noddy	The Sandman	Episode: "The Sandman Cometh"
1999	Wind at My Back	Senator Carlisle Woodman	Episode: "New Directions"
2000	La Femme Nikita	Gelman	Episode: "Getting Out of Reverse"
2000	The Golden Spiders: A Nero Wolfe Mystery	Fritz Brenner	Television film
2000	Angels in the Infield	The Devil	Television film
2000	Enslavement: The True Story of Fanny Kemble	John Quincy Adams	Television film
2000	Dirty Pictures	Walsh	Television film
2000	A House Divided	Dr. Lovick	Television film
2000	Relic Hunter	Hans Lubeck	Episode: "Last of the Mochicas"
2000	The Last Debate	Joshua Simpson	Television film
2000	Phantom of the Megaplex	Wolfgang Nedermayer	Television film
2001	Drive Time Murders	Frederick Rankin	Television film
2001	Laughter on the 23rd Floor	Cal Weebs	Television film
2001	The Zack Files	Charles	2 episodes
2001	Prince Charming	King Leo	Television film
2001–2002	A Nero Wolfe Mystery	Fritz Brenner	26 episodes
2002	Henry's World	Mr. Wiggins	25 episodes
2002	Master Spy: The Robert Hanssen Story	Westchester Priest	Television film
2002	Salem Witch Trials	Israel Porter	25 episodes
2003	America's Prince: The John F. Kennedy Jr. Story	Richard Lawton	25 episodes
2003	Deathlands: Homeward Bound	Baron Titus Cawdor	25 episodes
2003	Webs	Dr. Richard Morelli	25 episodes
2004	Peep and the Big Wide World	Newton	1 episode
2004	Wonderfalls	Fred Bradley	Episode: "Crime Dog"
2004	A Separate Peace	Professor Fitzwinkler	25 episodes
2004	Plain Truth	Bishop Stoflus	25 episodes
2004	The Manly Bee	Doc Zombie	
2004–2008	Atomic Betty	Supreme Overlord Maximus IQ (voice)	41 episodes
2005	Puppets Who Kill	Sir Percy Quill	Episode: "Buttons the Dresser"
2005	Our Fathers	Daniel Kibbe	25 episodes
2007	The Dead Zone	Father Brendan	Episode: "Transgressions"
2010	Unnatural History	Dante Morneau	Episode: "Pilot"
2010–2011	Bolts & Blip	Dr. Blood	26 episodes
2019	Mary Kills People	Priest	1 episode

== Video games ==
Colin Fox television credits
Year	Title	Role	Notes
1999	Hype: The Time Quest	Additional voices	
