= Lorne: The Man Who Invented Saturday Night Live =

2025 biography by Susan Morrison

- Author: Susan Morrison
- Language: English
- Genre: Biography
- Publisher: Random House
- Publication date: February 18, 2025
- Publication place: United States
- Media type: E-book, Print (Hardback), and Audiobook
- Pages: 656
- ISBN: 0812988876

Lorne: The Man Who Invented Saturday Night Live (also simply titled Lorne) is a 2025 biography written by Susan Morrison. The book centers around the NBC television program Saturday Night Live (SNL) and its creator, Canadian-American television producer Lorne Michaels. It was first published on February 18, 2025, two days after SNL's 50th anniversary special.

== Publication history ==
After Saturday Night Live (SNL) celebrated its 40th anniversary in 2015, Susan Morrison, the articles editor at The New Yorker, went to SNL creator Lorne Michaels' ninth-floor office at 30 Rockefeller Center to tell him directly about her intent to write his biography. Due to Michaels' aloof-like nature, Morrison told Michaels she would be talking to those around him, but encouraged him to open up. Prior to Lorne, Michaels had never chosen to be on-the-record for a biography, due to his belief that "there are no upsides to talking to reporters."

Although Lorne is "framed through a week behind the scenes in Studio 8H" and its parts labeled by days of the week, it took nine years to complete.

People first released the cover on October 22, 2024. The book was released on February 18, 2025 through Random House, two days following the 50th anniversary special of SNL.

On February 14, 2025, New York magazine reported that Morrison sent out a mass email invitation to an event for the book. This caused many of the recipients to hit "reply all" leading to an email storm. Some of the recipients included Tina Fey, who replied with a YouTube video on how to use email, and Colin Jost, who declared Fey's link was malware.

== Reception ==
The book became a New York Times best seller on March 9, 2025. A.O. Scott of the New York Times Book Review gave a positive review of the book saying Morrison "built Michaels the kind of biographical monument usually consecrated to founding fathers" and adding it was "briskly written and solidly source".

Doug Brod of the Toronto Star called it a "towering achievement, the definitive portrait of a cunning and creative genius responsible for cultivating a half-century of comedy’s biggest stars."

Brian Steinberg of Variety said "readers are treated to the Holy Grail for any journalist hoping to crack the show: a warts-and-all week in the life of SNL, where Morrison gets to see the real process of putting the thing together."

== See also ==
- History of Saturday Night Live
