= Linda Sorenson =

Retired Canadian film, television and voice actress (born 1940)

- Born: January 19, 1940 (age 86); Vancouver, British Columbia, Canada
- Occupation: Actress
- Years active: 1971–2017
- Awards: Canadian Screen Award for Best Supporting Actress

Linda Sorenson (born January 19, 1940) is a retired Canadian film, television and voice actress, best known for playing Mrs. Stegman in Class of 1984, Warden Howe in Murphy Brown, Virginia Reeves in Material World and Isabelle Carrington in Road to Avonlea. Sorenson, who hails from Vancouver, appeared in a number of film and television roles.

She voiced Love-a-Lot Bear in the Care Bears TV series, Blanche the Persian Cat in Webkinz and the old woman in Barbie and the Diamond Castle.

Sorenson has won two Genie Awards for Best Performance by an Actress in a Supporting Role in Joshua Then and Now and Draw!.

== Filmography ==
=== Film ===
| Year | Title | Role | Notes |
|---|---|---|---|
| 1971 | McCabe & Mrs. Miller | Blanche | |
| 1972 | The Merry Wives of Tobias Rouke | Holly | |
| 1973 | Paperback Hero | Mona | |
| 1973 | The Hard Part Begins | Alice Neely | |
| 1976 | Breaking Point | Helen McBain | |
| 1978 | I Miss You, Hugs and Kisses | Cynthia | |
| 1979 | Stone Cold Dead | Monica Page | |
| 1982 | Class of 1984 | Mrs. Stegman | |
| 1984 | Draw! | Teresa | |
| 1985 | Joshua Then and Now | Esther Shapiro | |
| 1987 | Adventures in Babysitting | Mrs. Anderson | |
| 1990 | Whispers | Kayla | |
| 1993 | Blood Brothers | Judge Goldberg | |
| 1994 | Relative Fear | Margaret Ladelle | |
| 2003 | Moving Malcolm | Ruby | |
| 2005 | Anne: Journey to Green Gables | Hetty King (voice) | Video |
| 2008 | Barbie & the Diamond Castle | Old Woman (voice) | Video |
| 2010 | Barney's Version | 2nd Mrs. P's Mother | |
| 2017 | The Mountain Between Us | Pamela | |

=== Television ===
| Year | Title | Role | Notes |
|---|---|---|---|
| 1973 | The Starlost | Dr. McBride | Episode: "Farthing's Comet" |
| 1978 | Breaking Up | Mickey | TV film |
| 1979 | King of Kensington | Mavis | Episode: "White Lace Gloves" |
| 1980 | The Great Detective | Dory | Episode: "A Family Business" |
| 1980 | The Courage of Kavik the Wolf Dog | Laura Evans | TV film |
| 1981 | The Running Man | Elaine | |
| 1981, 1984 | The Littlest Hobo | Louise, Mrs. Sloan | Episodes: "Here's Joey Jackson", "Indian Summer" |
| 1982 | Shocktrauma | Elizabeth Scanlan | TV film |
| 1982 | Hangin' In | Loretta | Episode: "Christmas Wrapping" |
| 1984 | Seeing Things | Doree | Episode: "Now You See Him, Now You Don't" |
| 1984 | Draw! | Teresa | TV film |
| 1985 | Night Heat | Linda Peters | Episode: "Songbird" |
| 1985 | Care Bears | Love-A-Lot Bear (voice) | TV series |
| 1986 | Airwaves | Elaine | Episode: "Breakfast Man" |
| 1986 | The Care Bears Family | (voice) | TV series |
| 1986 | Popples | Pretty Bit (voice) | TV series |
| 1986 | Many Happy Returns | Marsha Brenner | TV film |
| 1987 | Beverly Hills Teens | Fifi (voice) | Episode: "Dream Date" |
| 1987 | Starcom: The U.S. Space Force | (voice) | TV series |
| 1987 | The New Archies | Miss Grundy (voice) | Guest role |
| 1988 | Family Reunion | Bea | |
| 1988 | Garbage Pail Kids | (voice) | TV series |
| 1988 | CBS Summer Playhouse | Judy | Episode: "Mad Avenue" |
| 1989 | Thirtysomething | Roberta Sessions | Episode: "Elliot's Dad" |
| 1989 | Newhart | Florence | Episode: "Malling in Love Again" |
| 1990 | Murphy Brown | Warden Howe | Episode: "Subpoena Envy" |
| 1990–1993 | Material World | Virginia 'Ginny' Reeves | Regular role |
| 1992 | Miles from Nowhere | Ruth Carter | TV film |
| 1993 | The Hidden Room | Lydia | Episode: "Dreams About Water" |
| 1994 | Street Legal | Marjorie Taylor | Episode: "The Firm" |
| 1994 | Road to Avonlea | Isabelle Carrington | Episode: "Strictly Melodrama" |
| 1994 | RoboCop: The Series | The President | Episode: "Public Enemies" |
| 1994–1996 | Side Effects | Esther Knelman | Episodes: "Skin Deep", "Paying the Price", "You Can Run" |
| 1995 | Strauss: The King of 3/4 Time | Anna Strauss | TV film |
| 1995 | Lonesome Dove: The Series | Lulu Cody | Episode: "Buffalo Bill's Wild West Show" |
| 1996 | A Husband, a Wife and a Lover | Vivian | TV film |
| 1996 | Einstein: Light to the Power of 2 | Helen Dukas | TV film |
| 1996 | Poltergeist: The Legacy | Sister Jehann | Episode: "The Bones of Saint Anthony" |
| 1997 | Millennium | Marie France Dion | Episode: "Paper Dove" |
| 1997 | The Third Twin | Lorraine Logan | TV film |
| 1997 | I'll Be Home for Christmas | Margie | TV film |
| 1997–98 | The Adventures of Sam & Max: Freelance Police | (voice) | TV series |
| 1998 | A Father for Brittany | Marge Lussier | TV film |
| 1998 | Mythic Warriors | Demeter (voice) | Episode: "Persephone and the Wonder Seeds" |
| 1998–2000 | Bad Dog | (voice) | TV series |
| 1999 | Psi Factor | Moira Taggert | Episode: "Solitary Confinement" |
| 1999–2000 | Blaster's Universe | (voice) | TV series |
| 2000–02 | Anne of Green Gables: The Animated Series | Hetty King (voice) | Recurring role |
| 2005–09 | Mr. Meaty | (voice) | TV series |
| 2006 | This Space for Rent | Joan Forbes | TV film |
| 2006 | My Silent Partner | Clara Houser | TV film |
| 2007 | Masters of Horror | Pam | Episode: "Right to Die" |
| 2007 | Blood Ties | Betty Sagara | Recurring role |
| 2007 | Kyle XY | Nancy Hollander | Episode: "What's the Frequency, Kyle?" |
| 2008 | Psych | Chelsea | Episode: "The Old and the Restless" |
| 2008–11 | Kid vs. Kat | Old Lady Munson (voice) | Recurring role |
| 2009 | Held Hostage | Dr. Morse | TV film |
| 2014 | My Boyfriends' Dogs | Grandma Strang | TV film |
| 2017 | When We Rise | Edie Windsor | Episode: "Night IV: Part VI and VII" |
| 2017 | Undercover Angel | Peggy | TV film |

=== Radio ===
| Year | Title | Role | Notes |
|---|---|---|---|
| 1980, 1982 | Nightfall | Joyce, Model, Helen, Dr. Kosovic | 3 episodes |

== Recognition ==
- 1995 Gemini Award for Best Guest Performance in a Series by an Actress - Road to Avonlea - Nominated
- 1986 Genie Award for Best Performance by an Actress in a Supporting Role - Joshua Then and Now - Won
- 1985 Genie Award for Best Performance by an Actress in a Supporting Role - Draw! - Won
