= Doris Petrie =

Canadian actress

Doris Petrie (24 July 1918 – 21 August 2000) was a Canadian film and television actress, best known for her roles in the William Fruet films Wedding in White (1972) and Funeral Home (1980); and also the television series High Hopes, in which she played Meg Chapman.

She also had guest appearances in the television series Seeing Things, Airwaves, Night Heat, The Littlest Hobo, The Starlost, Street Legal, Forever Knight, Friday the 13th: the Series, TekWar: TekLords and Road to Avonlea, and the television films Catsplay, The Olden Days Coat and Love and Hate: The Story of Colin and JoAnn Thatcher.

Petrie was born in Londonderry, Nova Scotia. She died on August 21, 2000, in Toronto. She was the mother of television journalist Anne Petrie.
