= Susan Morrison =

American editor and writer

Susan Morrison is the articles editor at The New Yorker.

She is the former editor-in-chief of The New York Observer and an original editor of Spy.

In 2016, Morrison was elected as the president of the Century Association, a private social, arts, and dining club in New York City. She was the first woman elected to the position.

She is the editor of the book Thirty Ways of Looking at Hillary: Reflections by Women Writers (2008) and the author of the New York Times bestseller Lorne: The Man Who Invented Saturday Night Live (2025).

== Works ==
- Malanowski, Jamie; Morrison, Susan (1991). Spy High. Main Street Books. ISBN 978-0-385-41100-4.
- Thirty Ways of Looking at Hillary: Reflections by Women Writers (2008)
- Lorne: The Man Who Invented Saturday Night Live (2025)
