= High Hopes (Canadian TV series) =

High Hopes is a 1978 Canadian television soap opera that was shown on both Canadian and American television, starring performers Bruce Gray and Dorothy Malone.

The series was produced by Y&R Associates, Ltd, in conjunction with DCA Productions, Incorporated, and was filmed in Toronto. It was broadcast in Canada weekday afternoons on CBC Television, and syndicated to American television stations. The Canadian producer was Karen Hazzard. The show was initially directed by Bruce Minnix, and later by several Canadian directors, including Nigel Napier-Andrews. It was written by Bryan Barney, Mort Forer, Marian Waldman and Winifred Wolfe.

== Premise ==
Gray headlined the show as Dr. Neal Chapman, a local psychiatrist/family counselor who lived and worked in the twin communities of Cambridge and Cambridgeport, located somewhere in Canada (the province was never revealed, although there is a real-life Cambridge in Ontario).

He was associated with Delaney College, Cambridge's institution of higher learning. Much of the action was set at either the college, or in his large home in Cambridgeport, Cambridge's neighbor across an unknown river, which also served as his office.

Neal was divorced from his former wife Helen (Candace O'Connor), a nasty jet-setter, who had recently remarried; and they (supposedly) had a grown daughter, Jessica, nicknamed Jessie (Marianne McIssac), a student at Delaney College, who lived with him.

Also living in the Chapman house was his mother, Meg (Doris Petrie); she'd move in after suffering a serious fall in her own home (Jessie had once lived with her grandmother, Meg, after Helen sent her there after her remarriage); Louise Bates (Jayne Eastwood) a Cambridge real estate agent who had sold Neal his house, and his close friend, Cambridge attorney Walter Telford (Colin Fox, Granville Van Dusen), who lived with his wife, Evelyn Telford (Deborah Turnbull). Walter, Evelyn, Louise and another person, Dr. Jean Bataille, were all paying tenants in Neal's home in an attempt to help with finances.

Neal also worked with Dr. Dan Girard (Jan Muszynski), a mysterious young physician who worked at Cambridge's hospital.

In the story, most of the characters lived in Cambridgeport, and did their jobs and other various activities in the larger city of Cambridge across the river.

Despite his numerous counseling appointments and work at the hospital, Neal also found time for romance. He was involved romantically with Louise and also with local television talk show host, Trudy Bowen (Barbara Kyle). He was also (inexplicably) the target of a crush by Jessie.

One of the families Neal counseled most frequently was the Stewart family, one of Cambridge's more affluent families, which was composed of successful businessman husband Michael Stewart, Sr. (Michael Tait), who had been recently named the President of Cambridge's leading department store; his society (and agoraphobic) wife, Norma, (Vivian Reis) and their son, Michael, Jr. (Gordon Thomson). They had a daughter, Terri, who had died in a car accident, which sent Norma into a mental decline.

Another family he counseled was the more middle-class Sperrys, Amy (Gina Dick), a student at Delaney College, and her mother, Doris (Mignon Elkins).

Amy and Jessie were once friends, but they fell out over dating Michael Jr. and were now bitter enemies.

Much of the focus of the series was Neal counseling his many clients, who were members of the larger Cambridge/Cambridgeport communities, and/or Delaney College's students and faculty, whilst his own troubles mounted.

Neal had to deal with the trauma of realizing that Jessie wasn't his and Helen's daughter at all. She was revealed to be the daughter of Helen's sister, fashion coordinator, Paula Myles (Nuala Fitzgerald), whom she left with her sister and brother-in-law when she knew she couldn't raise her.

Ironically, Paula, who had a peculiar habit of calling her secretary, "sweetie" (and was more sympathetic than Helen) would work at Gordon's Department store, with Michael Stewart, Sr. They had had an affair many years previous, and the two still had feelings for one another. That made Norma and Paula enemies.

Upon hearing this shocking news about her parentage (Neal wanted her to know the whole story as she deserved to know the truth; while Paula wanted to keep it secret, more for her own protection than for her own daughter), Jessie took Paula's last name of Myles, and then sexually acted on her crush towards her now Aunt Helen's former husband.

Jessie's real father was revealed to be Michael Stewart, Sr. This ended romantic ties between her and Michael, Jr, but it made them stepsiblings. Jessie would move out of Neal's home and in with the Stewarts as a part of their family. If there was a positive to this, it was most beneficial to Norma.

Upon Jessie entering her family, showered her with love, taking Jessie in as one of her own. Jessie became her surrogate daughter. They became a truly caring mother/daughter duo, giving Norma a reason to live again.

Although it was more of a means to an end, to get even with Paula for her continued interest in her husband, Norma had a sincere love for Jessie, and the two proved to be a good support system for one another.

Michael Jr would take on a brotherly role to his new sister; looking out for her and making sure she was all right and protected, much as he had done with his late sister, Terri.

However, Amy Sperry, who now had a clear path with Mike, romantically, would resent his relationship with Jessie as his sister. Amy's insistence on hurting Jessie angered her mother, Doris; not to mention Jessie's parents, Paula, Mike Sr. and Norma, as well as Mike Jr., himself, who was ever protective of his newfound sister.

They all wanted her to leave Jessie alone. It was never revealed if Amy listened to them.

The show had a brief run in 1978, and was eventually cancelled. Musical arrangement was produced by Aeolus Productions, known for the themes and musical cues on American soap operas like All My Children, Ryan's Hope and One Life to Live.

== Notable alumni ==
Notable actors on the show, besides Gray and Eastwood who were already well established when this show aired, included Gordon Thomson, undoubtedly the show's most successful alumnus (he played Michael Stewart, Jr), who went on to much greater fame as Adam Carrington, the villainous son of Blake and Alexis Carrington on the 1980s prime-time soap Dynasty; Dorothy Malone who had been best known for her role of Constance MacKenzie in the 1960s soap opera, Peyton Place who played Carol Herzog; actor Nehemiah Persoff who played Carol's husband, Dr. Aaron Herzog; Granville Van Dusen and Colin Fox both of whom played attorney, Walter Telford; and Geraint Wyn Davies, best known for his role on the series Forever Knight, in one of his earliest roles, playing a Delaney College student named Glen.

== Cast ==
- Bruce Gray — Dr. Neal Chapman
- Doris Petrie — Meg Chapman
- Marianne McIssac — Jessica "Jessie" Myles (Chapman)
- Jayne Eastwood — Louise Bates
- Granville Van Dusen — Walter Telford #2
- Colin Fox — Walter Telford #1
- Deborah Turnbull — Evelyn Telford
- Jan Muszynski — Dr. Dan Girard
- Candace O'Connor — Helen Chapman
- Nuala Fitzgerald — Paula Myles
- Michael Tait — Michael Stewart, Sr.
- Vivian Reis — Norma Stewart
- Gordon Thomson — Michael Stewart, Jr.
- Barbara Kyle — Trudy Bowen
- Gina Dick — Amy Sperry
- Mignon Elkins — Doris Sperry
- Dorothy Malone — Carol Herzog
- Nehemiah Persoff — Dr. Aaron Herzog
- Geraint Wyn Davies — Glen
