= This Is the Law =

Canadian panel game show

- Developed by: Nigel Napier-Andrews
- Creative director: Jimmy Amaro (music)
- Presented by: Austin Willis
- Starring: Paul Soles; Robert Warner
- Country of origin: Canada

Production
- Running time: 30 min (time slot)

Original release
- Network: CBC
- Release: 21 June 1971 – 6 April 1976

This Is the Law is a Canadian panel game show which aired on CBC Television from 1971 to 1976.

== Description ==
It presented short, humorous vignettes supposedly set in various towns and cities across Canada which ran with musical accompaniment rather than a soundtrack, and challenged panelists to guess which (obscure) law of that particular region was being broken by the "Lawbreaker" character who was always arrested at the end of the vignette.

The vignettes were quite subtle, and more often than not, despite many guesses, the panelists were unable to come up with the law that was actually being broken, because the laws featured were generally archaic but, at the time of production, still on the books in the featured communities. (An example: in one vignette, the Lawbreaker is seen wearing a caveman-style costume at an event and engages in dubious behaviour before being suddenly arrested. After the panel failed to correctly identify the indiscretion, Willis indicated it was because the Lawbreaker's costume did not fully cover his chest, and in the Canadian locale where the vignette was set, it was illegal for individuals of any gender to expose their nipples in public.)

The vignettes alternated with depictions of actual court cases, presented in a series of still cartoons, in storyboard format, with narration. The narrator would end by asking a question about how the judge eventually ruled. The four panelists would each guess what the judge decided, and why, and each panelist would conclude by lighting up a large "Yes" or "No" in front of his or her seat. After all four panelists had guessed, the answer would be revealed.

Robert Warner starred as the police officer, and Paul Soles portrayed the Lawbreaker. Soles was the first show host, but after the initial 1971 summer episodes, Austin Willis became host, from the regular 1971 fall season until the end of the series.

== Cast ==
=== Panelists ===
- Julie Amato (1976)
- Bill Charlton (businessman by profession)
- Susan Gay (1971–1972)
- Susan Keller (1972–1975)
- Madeline Kronby (June–August 1971)
- Dini Petty (1971)
- Hart Pomerantz (lawyer and comedian by profession)
- Larry Solway (1971–1975)

=== Supporting vignette actors ===
- Paul Bradley
- Valri Bromfield
- Eric Clavering
- Trudy Desmond
- Robert McHeady
- Monica Parker
