= Doug McGrath =

Canadian actor (born 1935)

- Born: April 13, 1935 (age 91); Sydney, Nova Scotia, Canada
- Years active: 1970–2011
- Relatives: Derek McGrath (brother)

Doug McGrath (born April 13, 1935) is a Canadian actor whose most notable role was that of "Pete" in the acclaimed Canadian film Goin' Down the Road (1970) and its sequel Down the Road Again (2011). He also played in acclaimed Canadian films Wedding in White (1972), The Hard Part Begins (1973), the original Black Christmas (1974), Russian Roulette (1975) and Coming Out Alive (1980). He had a supporting role as a gym teacher in the cult comedy Porky's (1981), and also played roles in The Escape Artist (1982), Twilight Zone: The Movie (1983), the Australian comedy The Return of Captain Invincible (1983), Always (1989) and Ghosts of Mars (2001).

During McGrath's acting time in the U.S. he also appeared in several films alongside Clint Eastwood, including The Outlaw Josey Wales (1976), The Gauntlet (1977), Bronco Billy (1980) and Pale Rider (1985).

His brother is fellow actor Derek McGrath.

== Filmography ==
Year	Title	Role	Notes
1970	Goin' Down the Road	Pete McGraw	
1972	The Rowdyman	Pat	
1972	Wedding in White	Billy	
1973	The Hard Part Begins	Al Dawson	
1974	Black Christmas	Sergeant Nash	
1975	Russian Roulette	Lars	
1976	The Outlaw Josey Wales	Lige	
1976	Cat Murkil and the Silks	Detective Lambert	
1977	The Gauntlet	Bookie	
1980	Bronco Billy	Lieutenant Wiecker	
1980	Coming Out Alive	Kirkwood	
1981	Porky's	Coach Fred Warren	
1982	The Escape Artist	The Photographer	
1983	Twilight Zone: The Movie	Larry	(segment "Time Out")
1983	The Return of Captain Invincible	Adolf Hitler	
1985	Pale Rider	"Spider" Conway	
1989	Cold Front	Jackie Clearly	
1989	Always	Bus Driver	
1991	The Rocketeer	Reporter #3	
1993	Quick	Motel Deskman	
2001	Ghosts of Mars	Benchley	
2004	My Brother's Keeper	Mr. King	
2011	Down the Road Again	Pete McGraw	
