= The Hart and Lorne Terrific Hour =

Canadian television variety show

- Genre: Variety show
- Starring: Hart Pomerantz & Lorne Michaels
- Country of origin: Canada
- No. of seasons: 2

Original release
- Network: CBC
- Release: 1970 – 1971

The Hart and Lorne Terrific Hour is a Canadian variety show that aired on CBC Television in 1970 and 1971. It was part of Sunday At Nine, a CBC anthology that included documentaries, dramas (such as Corwin), and "light entertainment", both domestic and imported. The show starred Hart Pomerantz and Lorne Michaels. The show mixed comedy sketches with musical guests, in a format similar to Rowan & Martin's Laugh-In, the show that Michaels was working on before returning to Canada to star in his own show.

== Cast ==
- Lorne Michaels
- Hart Pomerantz

The cast also included:

- Dan Aykroyd
- Victor Garber
- Paul Bradley
- Marvin Goldhar
- Eleanor Beecroft
- Sydney Brown
- Jackie Burroughs
- Jayne Eastwood
- Alec Englander
- Andrea Martin
- Charles Palmer
- Allan Price
- Ted Turner
- Steve Weston

== Musical guests ==
Among the show's musical guests were James Taylor, Murray Mclauchlan and Cat Stevens.
