= Lorne Michaels =

Canadian and American producer (born 1944)

Lorne Michaels CC
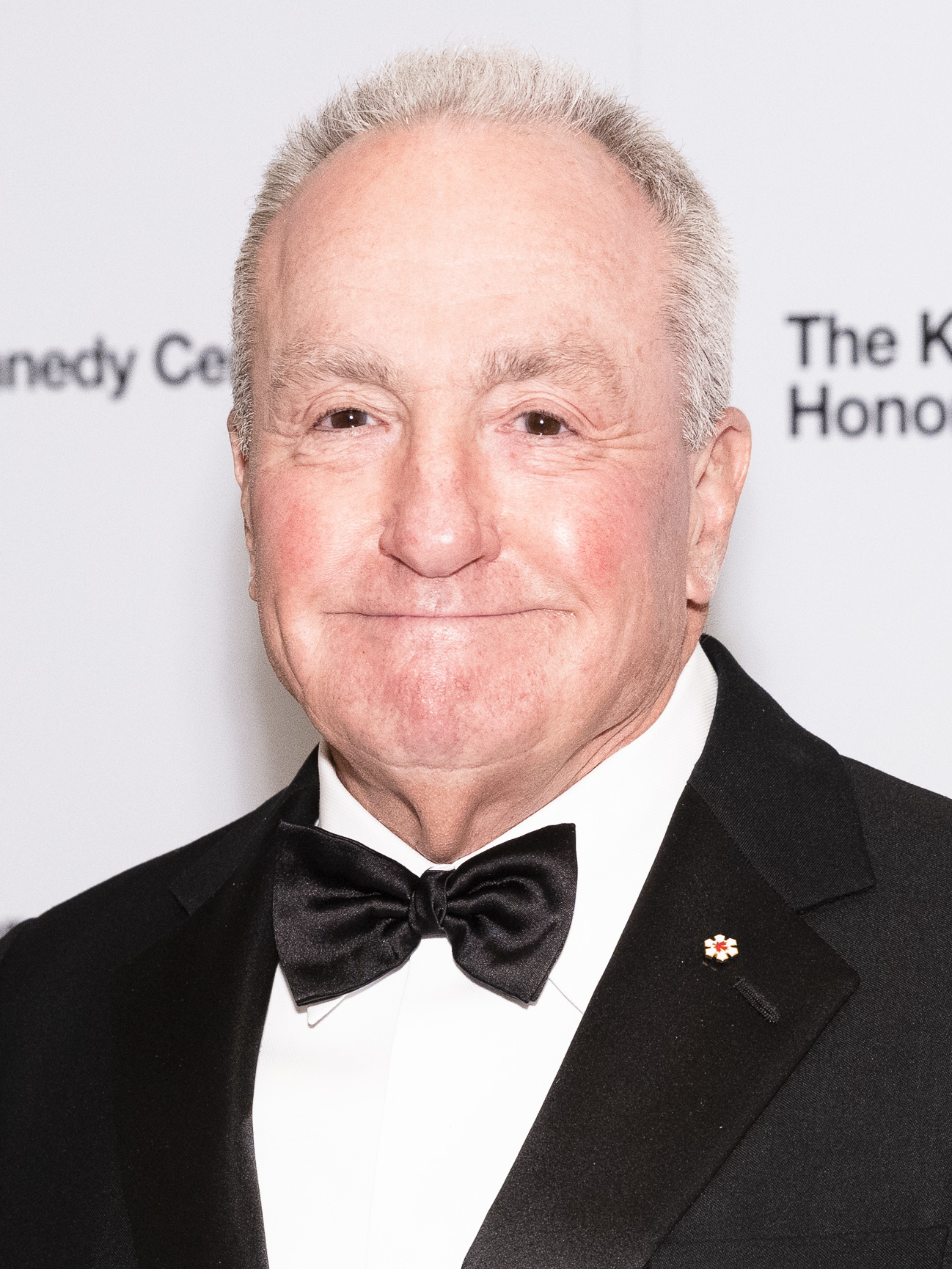
- Michaels in 2021
- Born: Lorne David Lipowitz; November 17, 1944 (age 82); Toronto, Ontario, Canada
- Citizenship: Canada; United States (from 1987)
- Education: University of Toronto (BA)
- Occupations: Producer; writer; comedian
- Years active: 1968–present
- Notable work: Saturday Night Live; Late Night; Laugh-In; Hart & Lorne
- Style: Deadpan comedy
- Political party: Democratic
- Spouses: Rosie Shuster (m. 1967; div. 1980); Susan Forristal (m. 1981; div. 1987); Alice Barry (m. 1991)
- Children: 3

Lorne Michaels (born Lorne David Lipowitz; November 17, 1944) is a Canadian and American television and film producer, screenwriter and director. He created and produced Saturday Night Live (1975–1980, since 1985) and produced the Late Night series (since 1993), The Kids in the Hall (from 1988 to 1995), and The Tonight Show (since 2014).

He has received 24 Primetime Emmy Awards from 112 nominations, holding the record as the most nominated individual in the award show's history.

== Early life ==
Lorne David Lipowitz was born to a Jewish family in Toronto, Ontario, on November 17, 1944, to Florence (née Becker) (1915–2001) and Abraham "Lefty" Lipowitz (1908–1959), who worked as a furrier.

Several sources incorrectly state that he was born on a kibbutz in the then-British mandate of Palestine, and that his Jewish family immigrated to Toronto, Ontario, when he was an infant. This rumour originated from a Vanity Fair article written by close friend Paul Simon that was intended to be comedic.

Michaels and his two younger siblings were raised in Toronto; he graduated from Forest Hill Collegiate Institute before attending University College at the University of Toronto, earning a Bachelor of Arts in English in 1966.

== Career ==
=== Early career ===
Michaels began his career as a writer and broadcaster for CBC Radio, working with partner Hart Pomerantz. He and Pomerantz moved to Los Angeles from Toronto in 1968 to work as writers for Rowan & Martin's Laugh-In and The Beautiful Phyllis Diller Show. In the same year, the duo released a comedy LP entitled The Comedy of Hart & Lorne.

At around the same time, when he was 23 years of age, comedian Frank Shuster and his wife, the parents of Michaels's then-wife, Rosie Shuster, recommended that he discard his typically Jewish surname in order to help facilitate his success in the entertainment industry. As a replacement, he settled on the Anglo-sounding name Michaels (perhaps, Pomerantz has speculated, in homage to the director Mike Nichols, whose work Michaels greatly admired), and Pomerantz, who was also a lawyer, assisted him in making this name change legal. The duo returned to Canada to star in The Hart and Lorne Terrific Hour, a series of comedy specials that ran on CBC in the early 1970s.

Michaels returned to the United States in 1973 to write for The Burns and Schreiber Comedy Hour. This brought him to the attention of Lily Tomlin who hired him to produce a series of specials, the first of which won an Emmy. Michaels credits his work with Tomlin for giving him the credibility needed for NBC to hire him to create Saturday Night Live.

=== Saturday Night Live ===
In 1975, Michaels created (with fellow NBC employee Dick Ebersol and president of the network Herb Schlosser) the television show NBC's Saturday Night, which in 1977 changed its name to Saturday Night Live (initially there was a name conflict with an ABC show titled Saturday Night Live with Howard Cosell, which debuted September 20, 1975, and was cancelled on January 17, 1976). The show, which is performed live in front of a studio audience, immediately established a reputation for being "cutting-edge" and "unpredictable." It became a vehicle for launching the careers of some of the most successful comedians in the United States.

Originally the producer of the show, Michaels was also a writer and later became executive producer. He occasionally appears on-screen as well, where he is known for his deadpan humor. Throughout the show's history, SNL has been nominated for more than 156 Emmy Awards and has won 36. It has consistently been one of the highest-rated late-night television programs. Michaels has been with SNL for all seasons except for his hiatus in the early 1980s (seasons 6–10).

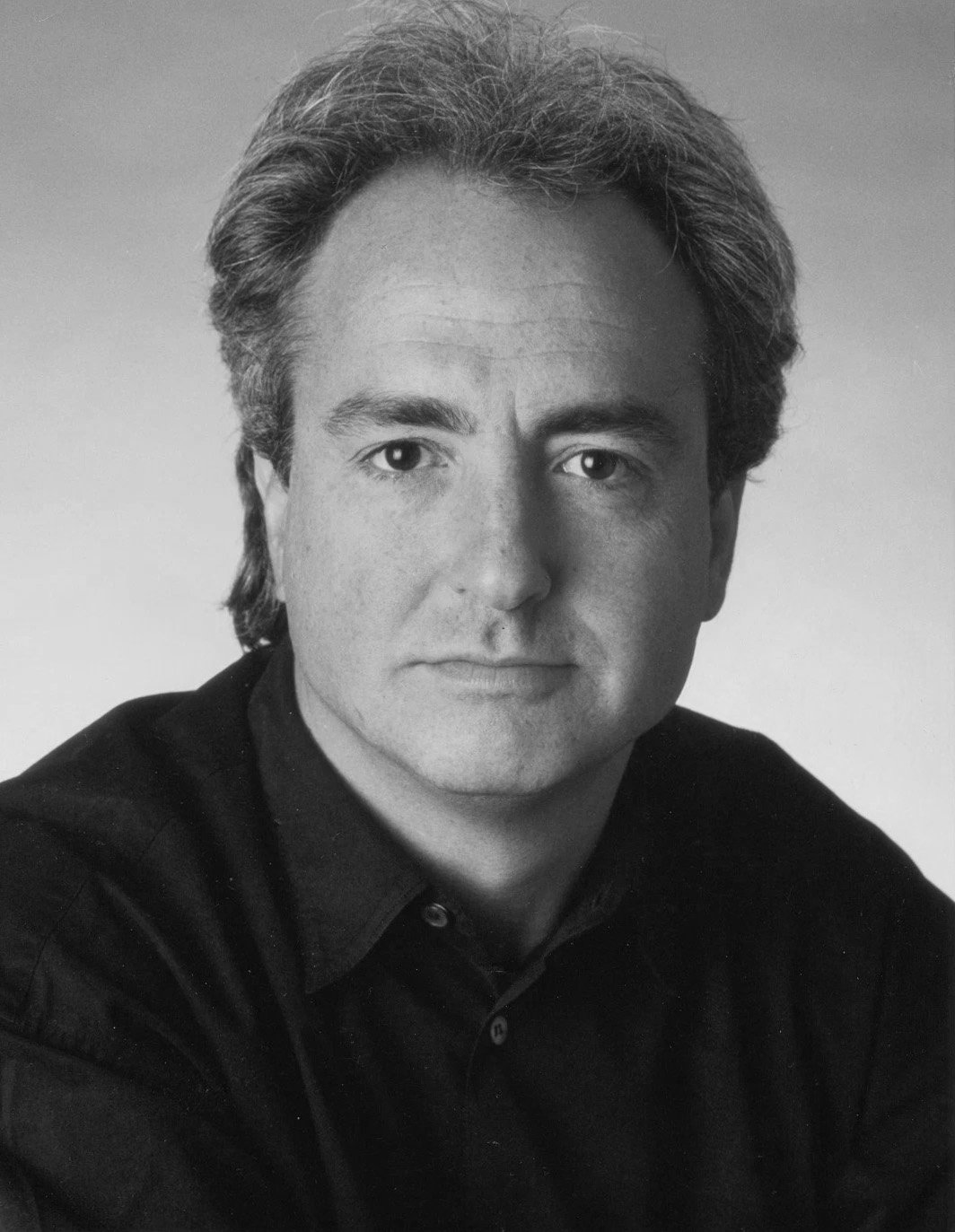
Michaels in 1988

Michaels appeared in the show during the first season, where he offered The Beatles $3000 to reunite on the show. He later increased his offer to $3200, but the money was never claimed. According to an interview with John Lennon in Playboy magazine, Lennon and Paul McCartney were in New York City that night and happened to see the program. They contemplated going onto the show as a joke but decided against it, as it was too late to get there in time, and they were both tired. This near-reunion was the basis for the television movie Two of Us. On the episode airing November 20, 1976, musical guest George Harrison appeared and attempted to collect the money, but Michaels told him the offer was conditional on all four members of the group showing up rather than just any Beatle.

=== Other work ===
During the 1978–1979 season of SNL, Michaels was offered a deal to produce nine features from Paramount, but he turned it down to take a three-picture deal from Warner Bros. The Warner Bros. deal didn't net any produced movies. In the early 80s, he subsequently had a deal to produce movies for MGM and was developing a Father Guido Sarducci movie written by Don Novello, a spoof of 1984 called 1985 that was set in the future and written by Al Franken, Tom Davis, and Jim Downey, and an adaptation of Pride and Prejudice Michaels himself was co-writing with friend John Head. The only movie to be produced from Michaels's MGM deal was Nothing Lasts Forever, a black-and-white surreal sci-fi comedy written and directed by longtime resident SNL filmmaker Tom Schiller. The movie featured appearances from Bill Murray and Dan Aykroyd, but the studio opted to never release it.

In 1979, Michaels founded the production company Broadway Video, which has produced SNL since 1981 as well as other shows such as Canadian sketch-comedy The Kids in the Hall, which began airing in 1988 on CBC in Canada, debuting in the U.S. market in 1989 on cable television network HBO until moving to CBS in 1993.

Whilst on his SNL hiatus, Michaels created another sketch show titled The New Show, which debuted on Friday nights in prime time on NBC in January 1984. The show failed to garner the same enthusiasm as SNL and was cancelled after 9 episodes.

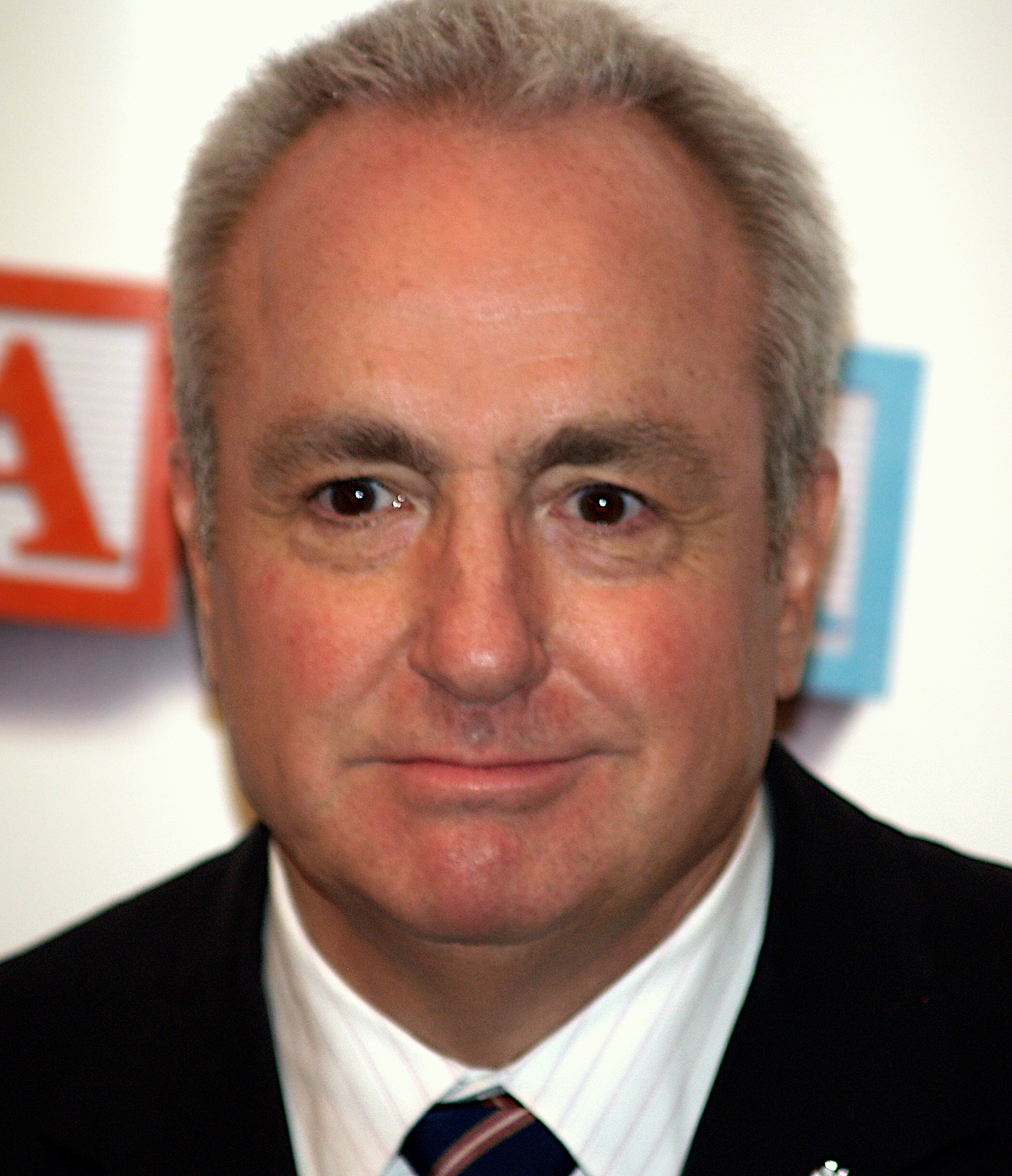
Michaels at the 2008 Tribeca Film Festival.

In the 1980s, Michaels appeared in an HBO mockumentary titled The Canadian Conspiracy about the supposed subversion of the United States by Canadian-born media personalities, with Lorne Greene as the leader of the conspiracy. Michaels was identified as the anointed successor to Greene.

Starting in the 1990s, Michaels has produced all of the movies that are based on SNL sketches, such as Wayne's World, A Night at the Roxbury, Coneheads, Stuart Saves His Family, and MacGruber, to name a few. Many of his other production credits star former SNL cast members, such as Tommy Boy, Mean Girls, and Will & Harper.

Michaels is also the executive producer of the NBC show Late Night, and was the executive producer of 30 Rock and Up All Night during their runs.

On April 3, 2013, it was announced that Michaels would be taking over as the executive producer for The Tonight Show. Consequently, The Tonight Show moved to New York in early 2014 as The Tonight Show Starring Jimmy Fallon.

On April 17, 2026, Morgan Neville's biographical documentary Lorne was released. The film includes interviews with previous Saturday Night Live cast members and others.

== Personal life ==
Michaels has been married three times. During the early 1960s, he began a relationship with Rosie Shuster, daughter of his comedy mentor Frank Shuster of the Wayne and Shuster comedy team, who later worked with him on Saturday Night Live as a writer. Michaels and Shuster were married in 1967 and divorced in 1980. He married model Susan Forristal in 1981, a marriage that ended in divorce in 1987. Michaels is married to Alice Barry, his former assistant. The pair wed in 1991. They have three children.

Michaels became an American citizen in 1987 and was inducted into the Order of Canada in 2002.

In January 2025, Michaels donated archival materials from throughout his career to the Harry Ransom Center at the University of Texas at Austin. The Lorne Michaels Collection was scheduled to become available for research in January 2026.

== Credits ==
=== Film ===
Year	Title	Role	Notes
1979	Mr. Mike's Mondo Video	Executive producer	
1980	Gilda Live	Producer, writer	
1984	Nothing Lasts Forever	Producer	
1986	¡Three Amigos!	Producer, writer	
1992	Wayne's World	Producer	
1993	Coneheads	Producer	
1993	Wayne's World 2	Producer	
1994	Lassie	Producer	
1995	Tommy Boy	Producer	
1995	Stuart Saves His Family	Producer	
1996	Black Sheep	Producer	
1996	Kids in the Hall: Brain Candy	Producer	
1998	A Night at the Roxbury	Producer	
1999	Superstar	Producer	
1999	Man on the Moon	Cameo as himself	
2000	The Ladies Man	Producer	
2001	Enigma	Producer	
2004	Mean Girls	Producer	
2007	Hot Rod	Producer	
2008	Baby Mama	Producer	
2010	MacGruber	Producer	
2012	The Guilt Trip	Producer	
2015	Staten Island Summer	Producer	
2016	Whiskey Tango Foxtrot	Producer	
2016	Brother Nature	Producer	
2016	Masterminds	Producer	
2017	Sandy Wexler	Cameo as himself	
2018	Love, Gilda	Himself	Documentary film
2024	Mean Girls	Producer	
2024	Will & Harper	Himself	Documentary film
2026	I'm Chevy Chase and You're Not	Himself	Documentary film
2026	Lorne	Himself	Documentary film

=== Television ===
Year	Title	Role	Notes
1968	Barris and Company	Writer	Variety show, CBC Television
1968	The Beautiful Phyllis Diller Show	Writer	Variety sketch series, NBC
1969	Rowan & Martin's Laugh-In	Writer	Variety sketch series, NBC
1969	The Jim Nabors Hour	Writer	Variety sketch series, CBS
1970–1971	The Hart and Lorne Terrific Hour	Costar, writer, producer	Variety show, CBC Television
1973	The Burns and Schreiber Comedy Hour	Writer	Summer variety sketch series, ABC
1973	Lily	Producer, writer	Comedy variety special, CBS
1973	The Perry Como Winter Show	Writer	Variety comedy special, NBC
1974	Flip Wilson... Of Course	Producer, writer	Comedy variety special, NBC
1974	The Hollywood Palladium	Writer	Comedy variety special, CBS
1975	Lily	Producer, writer	Comedy variety special, CBS
1975	The Lily Tomlin Special	Producer, writer	Comedy variety special, CBS
1975–1980; 1985–present	Saturday Night Live	Executive producer, creator	Variety sketch series, NBC
1978	All You Need Is Cash: The Rutles	Executive producer	Television movie
1982	The Concert in Central Park	Executive producer	Concert special, HBO
1984	The New Show	Producer	Variety sketch series, NBC
1988–1990	Sunday Night	Executive producer	Late night television, NBC
1988	40th Primetime Emmy Awards	Executive producer	Awards ceremony, FOX
1988–1995; 2022	The Kids in the Hall	Executive producer	Variety sketch series, CBC/Amazon Prime Video
1991	Lookwell	Producer	Television movie, NBC
1993–2009	Late Night with Conan O'Brien	Executive producer	Variety talk series, NBC
1993–1994	The Vacant Lot	Executive producer	Variety sketch series, CBC/Comedy Central
1995	Frosty Returns	Executive producer	Television Special, CBS
2002	The Rutles 2: Can't Buy Me Lunch	Executive producer	Television film
2002	The Colin Quinn Show	Executive producer	Variety talk series, NBC
2006	Sons and Daughters	Producer	Television series, ABC
2006–2013	30 Rock	Executive producer	Television series, NBC
2009–2014	Late Night with Jimmy Fallon	Executive producer	Variety talk series, NBC
2011–2018	Portlandia	Executive producer	Variety sketch series, IFC
2011–2013	Up All Night	Executive producer	Television series, NBC
2011–2017; 2021	Saturday Night Live Korea	Executive producer	Variety sketch series, NBC
2013–2015	The Awesomes	Executive producer	Television series, Hulu
2014–present	The Tonight Show Starring Jimmy Fallon	Executive producer	Variety talk series, NBC
2014–present	Late Night with Seth Meyers		Variety talk series, NBC
2014	Howard Stern Birthday Bash	Himself	Television special
2014–2015	Mulaney	Executive producer	Television series, Fox
2014	The Maya Rudolph Show	Executive producer	Variety talk series, IFC
2015–2017	Man Seeking Woman	Executive producer	Variety sketch series, FX
2015–2022	Documentary Now!	Executive producer	Variety sketch series, IFC
2015	Saturday Night Live 40th Anniversary Special	Executive producer, himself	Television special, NBC
2015	Adele Live in New York City	Executive producer	Television special, NBC
2016	Comedians in Cars Getting Coffee	Guest – Himself	Episode: "Everybody Likes to See the Monkeys", Netflix
2016	Maya & Marty	Executive producer	Variety sketch series, NBC
2017–2018	Detroiters	Executive producer	Television series, Comedy Central
2017	The David S. Pumpkins Halloween Special	Executive producer	Television special, NBC
2018–2021	A.P. Bio	Executive producer	Television series, NBC/Peacock
2018	70th Primetime Emmy Awards	Executive producer	Awards ceremony, NBC
2018	Love, Gilda	Himself	Documentary, HBO
2018	Norm Macdonald Has a Show	Guest – Himself	Episode: "Lorne Michaels", Netflix
2019–2021	Shrill	Executive producer	Television series, Hulu
2019–2023	Miracle Workers	Executive producer	Television series, TBS
2019–2023	The Other Two	Executive producer	Television series, Comedy Central/HBO Max
2019–2022	Los Espookys	Executive producer	Television series, HBO
2020	Mark Twain Prize: Dave Chappelle	Himself	Awards ceremony, PBS
2020	Mapleworth Murders	Executive producer	Television series, Quibi
2021–2022	Kenan	Executive producer	Television series, NBC
2021–2022	Miley's New Year's Eve Party	Executive producer	Television special, NBC/Peacock
2021–2022	That Damn Michael Che	Executive producer	Television series, HBO Max
2021–2023	Schmigadoon!	Executive producer	Television series, Apple TV+
2021	Saturday Morning All Star Hits!	Executive producer	Television series, Netflix
2021	MacGruber	Executive producer	Television series, Peacock
2023	Bupkis	Executive producer	Television series, Peacock
2025	Ladies & Gentlemen... 50 Years of SNL Music	Executive producer, himself	Television special, Peacock
2025	SNL50: The Homecoming Concert	Executive producer	Television special, Peacock
2025	Saturday Night Live 50th Anniversary Special	Executive producer, himself	Television special, NBC
2025	Sarah Squirm: Live + in the Flesh	Executive producer	Television special, HBO Max
2026	Saturday Night Live UK	Executive producer, himself	Television series, Sky One

=== Stage ===
Year	Title	Role	Theatre	Notes
1979	Gilda Radner: Live From New York	Producer, director, and writer	Winter Garden Theatre	
1998	Colin Quinn -- An Irish Wake	Producer	Helen Hayes Theatre	Straight Play
2018	Mean Girls	Producer	August Wilson Theatre	Broadway and North American tour
2022	Leopoldstadt	Producer	Longacre Theatre	Tony Award for Best Play
2024	All In: Comedy About Love	Producer	Hudson Theatre	
2025	All Out: Comedy About Ambition	Producer	Nederlander Theatre	
2026	Schmigadoon!	Producer	Nederlander Theatre	Tony Award for Best Musical

== In popular culture ==
In The Kids in the Hall movie Brain Candy, the character of Don Roritor was based heavily on actor Mark McKinney's impersonation of Lorne Michaels.

The character Dr. Evil, the antagonist of Austin Powers in three films, has mannerisms and a speaking style based on Lorne Michaels. Dr. Evil was created and portrayed by SNL alumnus Mike Myers, who was at least partially influenced by fellow SNL performer Dana Carvey's impression of Michaels.

In a 2008 interview with Playboy, as well as in various other interviews, Tina Fey admitted that Alec Baldwin's character Jack Donaghy on 30 Rock is inspired by Michaels. In a different interview, on NPR's radio show Wait Wait... Don't Tell Me!, Baldwin stated that some of his inspiration for Donaghy was drawn from Michaels.

Gabriel LaBelle plays Michaels in the 2024 film Saturday Night, a dramatization of behind-the-scenes events leading up to the first episode of Saturday Night Live.

In 2024, Michaels was depicted in the film The People's Joker, voiced by Maria Bamford.

== Honors ==
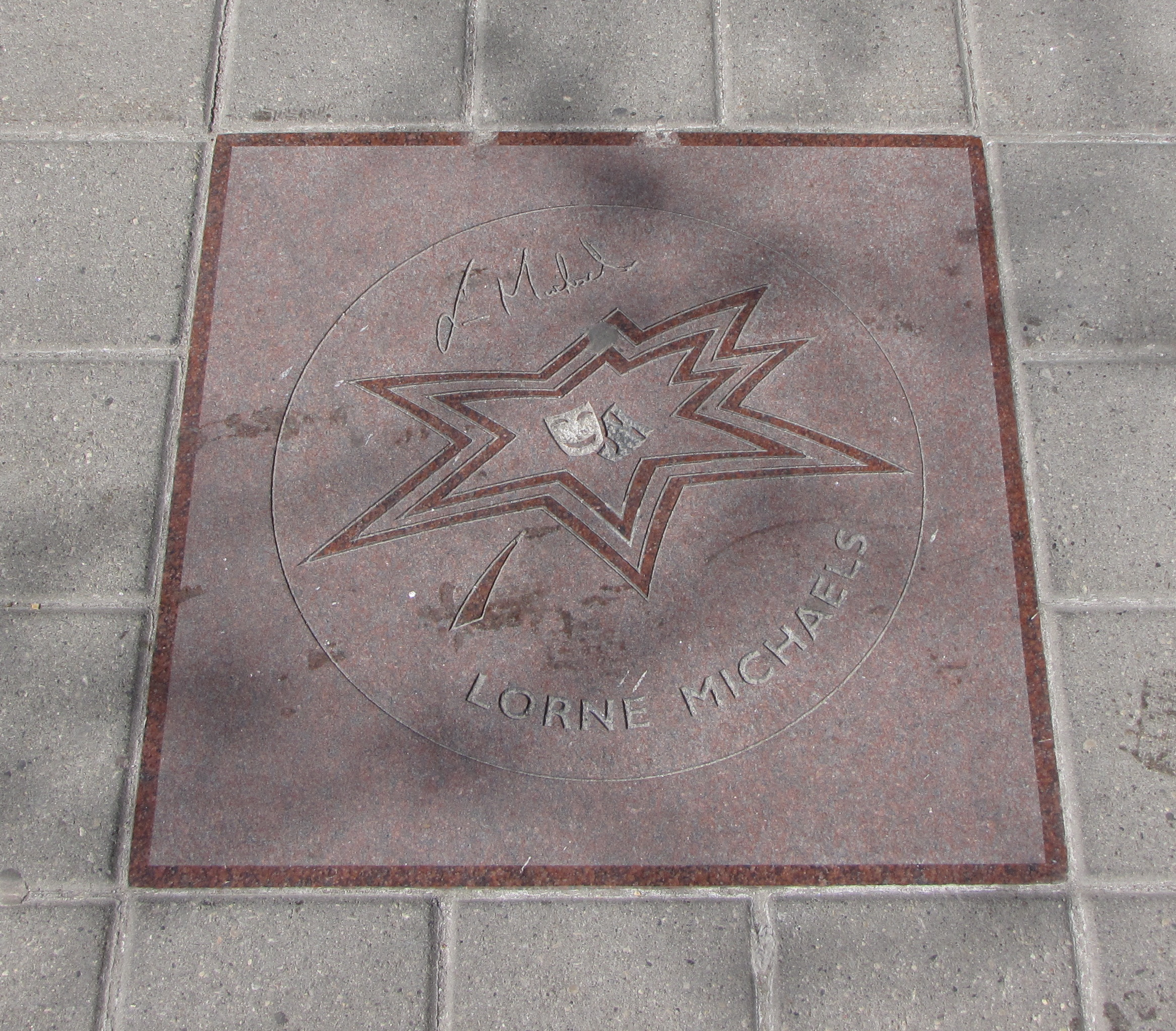
Michaels's star on Canada's Walk of Fame.

In 1999, Michaels was inducted into the Television Hall of Fame and was awarded a star on the Hollywood Walk of Fame.

Also in 1999, Michaels received an honorary degree from Ryerson University.

In 2003, he received a star on Canada's Walk of Fame.

In 2004, he was awarded the Mark Twain Prize for American Humor by the Kennedy Center in Washington, D.C. Speaking at the awards ceremony, original Saturday Night Live cast member Dan Aykroyd described the show as "the primary satirical voice of the country".

Michaels received the Governor General's Performing Arts Award for Lifetime Artistic Achievement in 2006, Canada's highest honor in the performing arts.

In 2008, Michaels was awarded the Webby for Film & Video Lifetime Achievement. With the allotted five words allowed to each recipient, his acceptance speech was "Five words is not enough".

In 2012, Michaels was awarded a rare Personal Peabody Award. He accepted at a ceremony in New York City at the Waldorf Astoria New York hotel.

In December 2021, Michaels was honored at the Kennedy Center Honors, along with Justino Diaz, Berry Gordy, Bette Midler, and Joni Mitchell.

In 2022, Michaels received a Peabody Award for his work as an executive producer of the Spanish-language comedy series Los Espookys. He was nominated for a second Peabody Award for his work producing Documentary Now!.

Ribbon	Description	Notes
	Companion of the Order of Canada (C.C.)	Awarded on: May 11, 2018; This is a promotion within the order
	Member of the Order of Canada (C.M.)	Awarded on: May 1, 2002; Invested on: February 21, 2003
	Queen Elizabeth II Golden Jubilee Medal for Canada	2002: As a member of the Order of Canada, he was also awarded with The Queen's Golden Jubilee Medal.
	Queen Elizabeth II Diamond Jubilee Medal for Canada	2012: As a member of the Order of Canada, he was also awarded with The Queen's Diamond Jubilee Medal.
	Presidential Medal of Freedom	On November 22, 2016, Michaels was awarded the Presidential Medal of Freedom, the United States's highest civilian honor.

== Bibliography ==
- Shales, Tom; Miller, James Andrew (October 6, 2015). Live From New York: The Complete, Uncensored History of Saturday Night Live as Told by Its Stars, Writers, and Guests (2nd ed.). Back Bay Books. ISBN 978-0-316-29506-2. LCCN 2014943177.
- Hill, Doug; Weingrad, Jeff (1986). Saturday Night: A Backstage History of Saturday Night Live. New York: Beech Tree Books. ISBN 978-0-688-05099-3.
- Morrison, Susan (2025). Lorne: The Man Who Invented Saturday Night Live. Random House. ISBN 978-0812988871.
