= Coming Out Alive =

1980 Canadian film directed by Don McBrearty

- Genre: Action; Crime; Drama
- Written by: John Kent Harrison
- Directed by: Don McBrearty
- Starring: Helen Shaver; Scott Hylands; Michael Ironside
- Theme music composer: Glenn Morley
- Country of origin: Canada
- Original language: English

Production
- Executive producer: Stanley Colbert
- Producer: Lawrence S. Mirkin
- Cinematography: Nikos Evdemon
- Running time: 73 minutes
- Production company: Canadian Broadcasting Corporation

Original release
- Release: September 27, 1980

Coming Out Alive is a 1980 Canadian television thriller film starring Helen Shaver, Scott Hylands, and Michael Ironside while being directed by Don McBrearty.

== Plot ==
After mother Isobel's disabled son Nicky is kidnapped by her estranged husband, she hires a hitman to reclaim him.

== Cast ==
- Helen Shaver as Isobel
- Scott Hylands as Jocko
- Michael Ironside as Gateway
- Christopher Crabb as Nicky
- Doug McGrath as Kirkwood
- Anne Ditchburn as Jane
- Monica Parker as Mrs. Tamblyn
- Winston Rekert as Cab Driver
- Amelia Hall as Sylvia
- John Rutter as Kennedy
- Patrick Brymer as Snyder
- Raymond Bélisle as Marcel
- John Bayliss as Fred
- Patrick Sinclair as Marvin
- Barbara Gordon as Helen
- Ken Anderson as Elwood

== Release ==
The film was released to video in the US by Trans World Entertainment in 1984.
