= Jayne Eastwood =

Canadian actress

- Born: December 17, 1946 (age 79); Toronto, Ontario, Canada
- Other names: Jane Easton; Jane Eastwood
- Education: Northern Secondary School of Toronto
- Occupations: Actress, comedian
- Years active: 1969–present
- Spouse: David Flaherty (died 2017)
- Children: 3

Jayne Eastwood (born December 17, 1946), also credited as Jane Easton or Jane Eastwood, is a Canadian actress and comedian. She is best known for her film roles as Anna-Marie Biddlecoff in Finders Keepers (1984), Judy the Waitress in The Santa Clause (1994), Mrs. White in the My Big Fat Greek Wedding franchise (2002–2023), Mrs. Borusewicz in Chicago (2002), Lucy Decker in Welcome to Mooseport (2004) and Miss Wimsey in Hairspray (2007).

She appeared in television roles including Gwen Twining in King of Kensington (1978–1980), Bernice in Material World (1990–1993), Aunt Agatha Flugelschmidt in the PBS Kids children's television series Noddy (1998–2000), Jeannie in Wild Card (2003), Bridget in Train 48 (2004–2005), Ronnie Sacks in This Is Wonderland (2005–2006), Maxine Bingly in Billable Hours (2006–2008), Miss Wispinski in Little Mosque on the Prairie (2008–2011) and Gloria Verrano in Haven (2013–2015).

Her voice roles include Birthday Bear in The Care Bears Family, Mrs. Rockchewer in The Neverending Story, Mrs. Kersplatski in Jojo's Circus, Lady Rataxes in Babar and the Adventures of Badou, Momma in Scaredy Squirrel and Helga Humdinger in PAW Patrol.

== Early life ==
Eastwood was born and raised in Hoggs Hollow of York Mills Road, in Toronto, Ontario. Her childhood was spent at a cottage in Muskoka, skiing in Collingwood, Ontario during winter and attending Northern Secondary School. She had attended a short class at the York Mills Collegiate Institute.

== Career ==
Eastwood's career was initially a painter. She ventured into acting when a commercial artist and friend of hers had invited her to play a role in a local play, Suddenly, Last Summer. A teacher, who was in the audience and revealed to be an acting agent, realized her potential.

Her very first noticeable acting roles were in various commercials for Sani Flush, Scope, Facelle Royale, Paris Pat, Toyota, Wintario, and Molson Golden gang commercials with friends Gilda Radner and Andrea Martin.

A veteran character actor who has appeared in films since 1970, Eastwood made an indelible mark on Canadian cinema early as the pregnant Betty in Don Shebib's classic Goin’ Down the Road. She was one of the original cast members of the Toronto branch of The Second City comedy troupe and was a semiregular on SCTV. She was in the original Toronto production of Godspell.

In 2005, she joined the cast of This Is Wonderland, a courtroom comedy drama. In 2007, she played Miss Wimsey in Hairspray. She is currently working in the Toronto theatrical production, Women Fully Clothed.

She has been a voice actor in ALF: The Animated Series, Annedroids, Best Ed, Bob and Margaret, Dino Dan: Trek's Adventures, Half a Pantaloon, JoJo's Circus, Monster by Mistake, Peep and the Big Wide World, and Babar and the Adventures of Badou. In 2013, she joined the cast of Haven as Dr. Gloria Veranno. She appears in seasons four and five.

== Awards ==
In 2013, she received the National Award of Excellence from ACTRA.

In 2019, she received the Award of Excellence at the Toronto ACTRA Awards.

At the 7th Canadian Screen Awards in 2019, Eastwood won the award for Best Supporting Performance in a Digital Program or Series for her appearance in the web series The Writers' Block. At the 9th Canadian Screen Awards in 2021, she won the award for Best Lead Performance in a Digital Program or Series for Hey Lady!. At the 12th Canadian Screen Awards in 2024, Eastwood won the award for Best Performance in an Animated Program or Series for her voice role in PAW Patrol. In 2024, was also a Canadian Screen Award nominee for her role in the Christmas episode of Pink Is In.

== Personal life ==
Eastwood is the widow of David Flaherty, who was a film and television writer, and brother of SCTV alumnus Joe Flaherty.

== Filmography ==
=== Film ===
Year	Title	Role	Notes
1970	Goin' Down the Road	Betty	
1975	My Pleasure Is My Business	Isabella	
1977	One Man	Alicia Brady	
1978	The Case for Barbara Pasons	Barbara Pasons	
1978	Tomorrow Never Comes	Girl in bar	
1978	Drying Up the Streets	Sheila	
1983	Videodrome	Woman Caller	
1984	Finders Keepers	Anna-Marie Biddlecoff	
1985	Left Out		
1985	The Care Bears Movie	Birthday Bear (voice)	
1986	My Pet Monster	Mrs. Smith	Video
1987	Love at Stake	Annabelle Porter	
1987	Night Friend	Rita the bag lady	
1987	Nowhere to Hide	Jean Bollinger	
1988	Candy Mountain	Lucille	
1988	Office Party	Joan Talmage	
1989	Cold Comfort	Mrs. Brockel	
1990	Stella	Nurse	
1990	Straight Line	Audrey Casper	
1994	The Circle Game	Marie	
1994	The Santa Clause	Judy the Waitress	
1996	Joe's Wedding	Agatha Rankin	
1997	That Old Feeling	Aunt Iris	
1998	Mirai	Mrs. Hasegawa (voice)	Direct to video
1999	Resurrection	Dolores Koontz	
2000	Where the Money Is	Connie	
2002	My Big Fat Greek Wedding	Mrs. White	
2002	Duct Tape Forever		
2002	Chicago	Mrs. Borusewicz	
2003	How to Deal	Mrs. Toussaint	
2003	Snow in the Skeleton Key	Granny Dowd	Short film
2003	Public Domain		
2004	Welcome to Mooseport	Lucy Decker	
2004	Dawn of the Dead	Norma	
2004	Moss	Ramona Coogan	Short film
2004	Raymond Radcliffe	Edie Chisholm	Short film
2004	Care Bears: Forever Friends	Funshine Bear (voice)	Video short
2006	Snow Cake	Ellen Freeman	
2006	Skinheads	Mother	Short film
2006	Find	Ma'am	Short film
2006	Monkey Warfare	Garage Sale Lady	
2007	You Kill Me	Kathleen Fitzgerald	
2007	Hairspray	Miss Wimsey	
2007	Walk Hard: The Dewey Cox Story	70s Girl	Uncredited
2008	Real Time	Grandma	
2008	The Echo	Lucille Jiminez	
2008	Coopers' Camera	Nana Gert	
2009	St. Roz	Mrs. P	
2011	Servitude	Edna	
2011	Moon Point	Femur's Grandmother	
2011	Down the Road Again	Betty	
2012	Looking Is the Original Sin	Janet	
2012	The Story of Luke	Theresa	
2014	Beethoven's Treasure Tail	Grace O'Malley	Video
2015	No Stranger Than Love	Brenda	
2016	My Big Fat Greek Wedding 2	Mrs. White	
2016	The Second Time Around	Betty	
2016	The Space Between	Luella	
2019	Buffaloed	Rhonda	
2020	Work It	Ruthie	
2020	Jump, Darling	Jeanne	
2021	Trigger Point	Irene Cole	
2021	Home Sweet Home Alone	Grandma	Uncredited
2022	Hotel for the Holidays	Florence	
2023	My Big Fat Greek Wedding 3	Mrs. White	
2025	The Rug	Edna Dowell	Short film
2025	Silver Screamers	Herself	Documentary film
2026	Relationship Goals	Doris Diner Waitress	

=== Television ===
Year	Title	Role	Notes
1970	That's Show Biz		
1970	The Hart and Lorne Terrific Hour	Various	
1970	Party Game	Charades Player	
1971	Famous Jury Trials		
1974	Deedee		TV movie
1974	Back to Beulah		TV movie
1974–1975	Funny Farm		
1975–1976	Summer of '75	Host	
1975	Performance	Sadie	Episode: "Lulu Street"
1976	Performance	Hardy	Episode: "The Last of the Four Letter Words"
1976	Ada	Leslie	
1976	Stay Tuned		
1976–1984	SCTV	Various	Recurring role
1977	The World of Darkness	Helen	TV movie
1977	For the Record		Episode: "Ada"
1978	High Hopes	Louise Bates	TV movie
1978–1980	King of Kensington	Gwen Twining	23 episodes
1980	Bizarre	Main role	
1981	For the Record		Episode: "Snowbird"
1981–1982	The Littlest Hobo	Felicity Patelli	Episodes: "Hidden Room", "Rex Badger P.I."
1981–1982	Hangin' In	Audrey / Mrs. Costello	Episodes: "I'm Not a Marriage Counselor", "Plasma Suite" & "Christmas Wrapping"
1984	When We First Met		TV movie
1985	Anne of Green Gables	Mrs. Hammond	TV movie
1985	The Ray Bradbury Theater	Mrs. Braling	Episode: "Marionettes, Inc."
1985–1988	The Care Bears Family	Birthday Bear / Bedtime Bear (voice)	57 episodes
1985–1987	Night Heat	Various	5 episodes
1986	Seeing Things	Rita	Episode: "The Walls Have Eyes"
1987	Sharon, Lois & Bram's Elephant Show	The Evil Queen	Episode: "Snow White Elephant"
1987	The Kidnapping of Baby John Doe	Joan	TV movie
1987	Today's Special	Flora Frimble	Episode: "Ice Cream"
1987	Shades of Love: Indigo Autumn	Louise	TV movie
1987	Really Weird Tales	Mother Superior	Segment: "I'll Die Loving"
1987	Echoes in the Darkness	Betty Vannort	TV movie
1988	Diamonds		Episode: "Family Business"
1988	Sharon, Lois & Bram's Elephant Show	Gladys Bertlinger	Episode: "Unicef"
1988	Ramona	Mrs. Whaley	Episode: "Squeakerfoot"; Episode: "Ramona the Patient"
1988	Drop-Out Mother	Blanche	TV movie
1988	Once Upon a Giant	Diabolica the Bad Witch	TV movie
1988	God Bless the Child	Mrs. Prentice	TV movie
1988–1989	ALF: The Animated Series	Additional voices	13 episodes
1989	Andrea Martin... Together Again	Marsha Martin	TV movie
1989	Starting from Scratch		Episode: "Robbie and Friends"
1989	Small Sacrifices	Evelyn Slaven	TV movie
1990	Mom P.I.		Episode: "Beneath the Pacific"
1990	Back to the Beanstalk	Jack's Mother	TV movie
1990	Friday the 13th: The Series	Joni	Episode: "My Wife as a Dog"
1990	War of the Worlds	Grace	Episode: "Candle in the Night"
1990	Wish You Were Here	Stella	Episode: "Budapest"
1990	The Ray Bradbury Theater	Elmira Brown	Episode: "Exorcism"
1990–1992	Material World	Bernice	25 episodes
1991–1992	Maniac Mansion	Avi's mother /Kaite /Hildie Muckle	Episodes: "The Cliffhanger", "The New Look" & "Streetcar Named Idella"
1992	Partners in Love	Heddy Taylor	TV movie
1993	Secret Service	Hillary	Episode: "Something for Nothing/The Amateur"
1993	Ghost Mom	Pearl	TV movie
1993	Shining Time Station	Helga Boonswaggle / Jane	Episodes: "Bad Luck Day At Shining Time Station" & "Schemer Presents: How To Apologize"
1994	Against Their Will: Women in Prison	Marge	TV movie
1994	Street Legal	Det. Jane Stamp	Episodes: "Last Rites: Part 1 & 2"
1994	Tales from the Cryptkeeper		Episode: "Transvylvania Express"
1995	The Neverending Story	Mrs. Rockchewer (voice)	Episode: "The Meek and the Mighty"; Episode: "Missing Memories"
1995	Harrison Bergeron	Ms. Newbound	TV movie
1995–1996	Side Effects	Happy Hartwell	Episodes: "Pillow Talk", "Sex, Death and Rock 'n' Roll"
1996	Goosebumps	Woman in Line	Episodes: "A Night in Terror Tower: Parts 1 & 2"
1996	Devil's Food	Margaret	TV movie
1996	Undue Influence	Mrs. Miller	TV movie
1996	Dangerous Offender: The Marlene Moore Story	Mrs. Moore	TV movie
1996	A Holiday for Love	Margie	TV movie
1997	Riverdale	Gloria	
1998	Twitch City	Nathan's Mother	Episode: "I Look Like Joyce DeWitt"
1998	Once a Thief	Miss Finchley (voice)	Episode: "The Director Files"
1998	Bob and Margaret	Cookie Fish / Joyce (voice)	Episode: "A Tale of Two Dentists"
1998–2000	Noddy	Aunt Agatha Flugelschmidt	66 Episodes
1999	Deep in My Heart	Mrs. Marsdon	TV movie
1999	Mind Prey	Police Chief Roux	TV movie
1999	A Holiday Romance	Margie	TV movie
2000	La Femme Nikita	Selma Hertz	Episode: "Catch a Falling Star"
2000	Code Name: Eternity	Lucy	Episode: "Dark of the Night"
2000	Exhibit A: Secrets of Forensic Science	Deidre Porchev	Episode: "If the Shoe Fits"
2000	For Better or For Worse	Mrs. Dingle (voice)	5 episodes
2000–2001	Twice in a Lifetime	Emma Price/Lulu	Episodes: "For Love and Money" & "Daddy's Girl"
2001	Club Land	Nurse Doris	TV movie
2001	The Wandering Soul Murders	Beth Mirasty	TV movie
2001	What Makes a Family	Judge Shales	TV movie
2001	Made in Canada	Miss Barnes	Episode: "Beaver Creek: Live"
2001	Life with Judy Garland: Me and My Shadows	Lottie	TV movie
2001	Screech Owls	Mrs. Dunlap	Episode: "A Fine Balance"
2001	Royal Canadian Air Farce	Various	Episode: "9.4"
2001	The Endless Grind	Various	TV series
2001	Bob and Margaret	Cookie Fish / Joyce (voice)	Episode: "A Very Fishy Christmas"
2002	Widows	Audrey	Episode: "Hour One"
2002	Just a Walk in the Park		TV movie
2002	The Man Who Saved Christmas	Mrs. Gilbert	TV movie
2002–2003	Moville Mysteries	Granny (voice)	3 episodes
2003	Monster by Mistake	Dolores (voice)	Episode: "Warren's Nightmare"
2003	In the Family	Alice/Donna Ingram	TV movie
2003	My Big Fat Greek Life	Mrs. White	
2003	Wild Card	Jeannie	4 episodes
2003	Slings and Arrows		Episode: "Playing the Swan"
2003	The Berenstain Bears	Great Aunt Bess (voice)	Episode: "Family Get-Together"
2003–2006	JoJo's Circus	Mrs. Kersplatski	9 episodes
2004	Peep and the Big Wide World	Rabbit	
2004	The Shields Stories		Episode: "The Harp"
2004	Brave New Girl		TV movie
2004	Sue Thomas: F.B.Eye	Janice	Episode: "The Kiss"
2004	Hustle	Marge Schott	TV movie
2004	Suburban Madness	Sheila	TV movie
2004	Degrassi: The Next Generation	Mrs. Cameron	Episode: "Back in Black"
2004–2005	Train 48	Bridget	3 episodes
2005	I Do, They Don't	Thelma	TV movie
2005	Riding the Bus with My Sister	Estella	TV movie
2005	Wayside: The Movie	Miss Mush	TV movie
2005	Atomic Betty	Betty's Grandma	Episode: "Franken Brain"; Episode: "The NO-L9"
2005–2006	This Is Wonderland	Ronnie Sacks	23 episodes
2006	Relative Chaos	Carol Gilbert	TV movie
2006	Candles on Bay Street	Sarah	TV movie
2006	The Great Polar Bear Adventure	Hillary (voice)	TV movie
2006	Wedding Wars	Wanda Grandy	TV movie
2006–2008	Billable Hours	Maxine Bingly	20 episodes
2007	Wayside	Miss Mush	(voice) recurring role
2007	Ruby Gloom	Ma (voice)	Episode: "Skull in the Family"
2007	Ricky Sprocket: Showbiz Boy	Bunny Sprocket (voice)	25 episodes
2007	Twitches Too	Mrs. Norseng	TV movie
2007	Roxy Hunter and the Mystery of the Moody Ghost	Mable Crabtree	TV movie
2008	Roxy Hunter and the Myth of the Mermaid	Mable Crabtree	TV movie
2008	Anne of Green Gables: A New Beginning	Mrs. Hammond	TV movie
2008–2009	Best Ed	Additional voices	26 episodes
2008–2011	Little Mosque on the Prairie	Mrs. Wispinski	Recurring role
2009	Northern Lights	Mayor Hopp	TV movie
2009	Bob & Doug	Gladys McKenzie	Episode: "No Country for Old People"
2009	The Ron James Show	Steve's Mother	Episode: "1.4"
2009	The National Tree	Lana	TV movie
2009	The Christmas Hope	Charlotte	TV movie
2010	Harriet the Spy: Blog Wars	Ms. Elson	TV movie
2010	Living in Your Car	Lola	Episodes: "1.8 & "1.13"
2010	Skatoony	Charles' Granny	Episodes: Skeleton Crew In Da House and Hooray for Bollywood
2010	Pirates: Adventures in Art	Queen Conformia	
2010–2011	Babar and the Adventures of Badou	Lady Rataxes (voice)	15 episodes
2011–2013	Scaredy Squirrel	Momma (voice)	Recurring role
2011	Lost Girl	Velma	Episode: "BrotherFae of the Wolves"
2011	Silent Witness	Sara Croft	TV movie
2011	12 Dates of Christmas	Margine Frumkin	TV movie
2012	Bill & Son's Towing		Short
2012	King	Margie Reynolds	Episode: "Jared and Stacy Cooper"; Episode: "Wendy Stetler"
2013–2015	Haven	Gloria Verrano	Recurring role
2014	Christmas at Cartwright's	Mrs. Rositani	TV movie
2016	All Yours	Vivian	TV movie
2016	The Rocky Horror Picture Show: Let's Do the Time Warp Again	The Butler	TV movie
2017, 2024	Murdoch Mysteries	Mary Baker Eddy / Abigail Halston	Episodes: "The Accident" & "Mrs. Crabtree's Neighbourhood"
2017–2022	Workin' Moms	Goldie	9 episodes
2018	Cupcake & Dino: General Services	Additional Voices	3 episodes
2018	Star Falls	Granny King	Episode: "The Family Picnic"
2020	Hey Lady!	Lady	Web series
2021	Overlord and the Underwoods	Nana Kirkland	
2021–2024	PAW Patrol	Helga Humdinger (voice)	6 episodes
2022	Pink Is In	Mabel Dungworth	Episode: "A Pink and Green Christmas"
2023–2024	Ruby and the Well	Miss Freda Grady	4 episodes
2023	'Twas the Text Before Christmas	Nana/Maybel	Great American Family
2024	Sullivan's Crossing	Mrs. Bailey	Episode: "It's a Wonderful Life"
2024	The Christmas Charade	Gladys (the Jewler)	Hallmark Channel Movie
2025	Son of a Critch	Ellie	Episode: "Front Page Challenge"
2025	Dino Dex	Mrs. Currie	Episode: "Megafauna Mystery"
2026	Ghosts	Irene	season 5 episode 16 "Woodstone Royale"
