= Robert Verrall =

Canadian director and producer (1928–2025)

- Born: 13 January 1928; Toronto, Ontario, Canada
- Died: 17 January 2025 (aged 97); Montreal, Quebec, Canada
- Occupations: Producer, director, animator
- Awards: see below

Robert Verrall (13 January 1928 – 17 January 2025) was a Canadian animator, director and film producer who worked for the National Film Board of Canada (NFB) from 1945 to 1987. Over the course of his career, his films garnered a BAFTA Award, prizes at the Cannes Film Festival and Venice Film Festival, and six Academy Award nominations.

== Life and career ==
One of the first to join the NFB's fledgling animation unit, under Norman McLaren, Verrall would work as animator on such notable NFB animated shorts as The Romance of Transportation in Canada and produce such shorts as Cosmic Zoom, Hot Stuff as well as the Academy Award-nominees The Drag and What on Earth!. His NFB animation credits as executive producer included The Family That Dwelt Apart and Evolution, also Oscar nominees.

Verrall was named director of English-language NFB animation in 1967, and director of NFB's English-language production overall, in 1972. In the 1980s, he acted as executive producer on a number of NFB co-productions, including the film adaption of The Wars and The Tin Flute. His documentary production credits included Alanis Obomsawin's 1986 Richard Cardinal: Cry from a Diary of a Métis Child. He was the father of David Verrall, who would himself go on to head the NFB's English-language animation unit.

Verrall died on 17 January 2025, four days after his 97th birthday.

== Filmography ==
- The Three Blind Mice - animated short film, George Dunning 1945 - co-animator with George Dunning and Grant Munro
- Christmas Carols - short film, Jim MacKay 1947 - co-animator
- A Story About Breadmaking in the Year 1255 A.D. - documentary short, 1948 - cinematographer, editor, animator, director
- Time and Terrain - documentary short, Colin Low 1948 - co-editor with Colin Low
- A Capital Plan - documentary short, Bernard Devlin 1949 - animator
- Planning Canada’s National Capital - documentary short, Donald Fraser 1949 - co-animator with Allan Ackman and Gordon Petty
- Date of Birth - short film, Donald Fraser 1950 - animator
- Ottawa: Today and Tomorrow - documentary short, Bernard Devlin 1951 - animator
- Age of the Beaver - documentary short, Colin Low 1952 - co-animator with Sidney Goldsmith
- The Romance of Transportation in Canada - documentary short, Colin Low 1952 - co-animator with Wolf Koenig
- The Structure of Unions - documentary short, Morten Parker 1955 - writer
- The Colour of Life - documentary short, J.V. Durden 1955 - co-animator with Evelyn Lambart
- The Maple Leaf - documentary short, J.V. Durden 1955 - co-animator with Evelyn Lambart
- Grain Handling in Canada - documentary short, Guy L. Coté 1955 - animator
- A is for Architecture - documentary short, 1959 - co-director with Gerald Budner
- The St. Lawrence Seaway - documentary short, John Howe and Isobel Kehoe 1959 - animator
- Hors-d'oeuvre - collection, 1960 - co-director and co-animator
- Collèges classiques in Quebec - documentary short, Pierre Patry 1961 - co-editor with Arthur Lipsett
- The Great Toy Robbery - cartoon, Jeff Hale 1963 - co-producer with Wolf Koenig
- Percé on the Rocks - documentary short, Gilles Carle 1964 - animator
- The Drag - animated short, Carlos Marchiori 1965 - co-producer with Wolf Koenig
- Energy and Matter - documentary short, 1966 - animator, director
- Alphabet - animated short, Eli Noyes 1966 - producer
- Artificial Lung - documentary short, 1966 - director
- What on Earth! - animated short, Les Drew and Kaj Pindal 1966 - co-producer with Wolf Koenig
- Kurelek - documentary short, William Pettigrew 1967 - co-producer with Tom Daly
- Pikangikum - documentary short, John Gould 1967 - co-producer with John Kemeny
- Tax Is Not a Four-Letter Word - cartoon, Michael Mills 1967 - producer
- Two Films by Lipsett - experimental, Donald Rennick 1968 - co-producer with Joe Koenig and Mark Slade
- Around Perception - experimental animation, Pierre Hébert 1968 - producer
- Boomsville - documentary short, Yvon Mallette 1968 - producer
- In a Box - animated short, Eli Noyes 1968 - producer
- King Size - animated short, Kaj Pindal 1968 - co-producer with Wolf Koenig
- Origami - documentary short, Joan Henson 1968 - producer
- Population Explosion - documentary short, Pierre Hébert 1968 - co-producer with Wolf Koenig
- Rx for Export - documentary short, Pierre Hébert 1968 - co-producer with Wolf Koenig
- Cosmic Zoom - documentary short, 1968 - director, co-producer with Joe Koenig
- Little Red Riding Hood - animated short, Rhoda Leyer 1969 - producer
- The Cartoon Film - documentary short, William Pettigrew 1969 - co-producer with Wolf Koenig
- The Half-Masted Schooner - documentary short, Bruce Mackay 1969 - co-producer with Wolf Koenig
- The Sky is Blue - animated short, Rick Raxlen 1969 - producer
- To See or Not to See - animated short, Břetislav Pojar 1969 - co-producer with Wolf Koenig
- Ashes of Doom - short film, Grant Munro and Don Arioli 1970 - co-producer with Wolf Koenig
- Best Friends - short film, Bob Browning 1970 - co-producer with Wolf Koenig
- Loops to Learn By - documentary short, Rex Tasker 1970 - co-producer with Dorothy Courtois
- Of Many People - documentary short, Stanley Jackson 1970 co-producer with John Spotton
- The City: Osaka - animated short, Kaj Pindal 1970 - co-producer with John Kemeny
- Doodle Film - animated short, Donald Winkler 1970 - producer
- What is Life? - animated short, 1970 - co-producer with Joe Koenig
- Where There's Smoke - compilation, 1970 - co-director, executive producer
- Christmas at Moose Factory - documentary short, Alanis Obomsawin 1971 - executive producer
- Citizen Harold - animated short, Hugh Foulds 1971 - executive producer
- Evolution - animated short, Michael Mills 1971 - executive producer
- Hot Stuff - animated short, Zlatko Grgić 1971 - co-producer with Wolf Koenig
- In a Nutshell - animated short, Les Drew and Michael Mills 1971 - co-producer with Wolf Koenig
- Out of Silence - documentary short, Léonard Forest 1971 - executive producer
- Pavilion - documentary short, Donald Rennick 1971 - executive producer
- Propaganda Message - animated short, Barrie Nelson 1971 - executive producer
- The Men in the Park - animated short, George Geertsen 1971 - producer
- The Specialist - animated short, Don Arioli and Boris Kolar 1971 - producer
- Percy Saltzman Anti-Smoking Clip - documentary short, Don Arioli and Grant Munro 1971 - producer
- 180 is Max - documentary short, William Pettigrew 1972 - producer
- A Film For Japan - documentary short, Rex Tasker 1972 - producer
- Bloodsugar - experimental, Rick Raxlen 1972 - executive producer
- Exeter - documentary short, Gerald Budner 1972 - executive producer
- Gore Road - documentary short, Sarah Evett 1972 - producer
- Hard Rider - documentary short, Josef Reeve 1972 - executive producer
- Paul Kane Goes West - documentary short, Gerald Budner 1972 - executive producer
- The North Wind and the Sun: A Fable by Aesop - cartoon, Rhoda Leyer and Les Drew 1972 - producer
- The Underground Movie - animated short, Les Drew 1972 - executive producer
- Tilt - animated short, Don Arioli 1972 - executive producer
- 11 Steps to Survival - animated demonstration, Pierre L'Amare 1973 - co-producer with Pierre L’Amare
- General Health - documentary short, Břetislav Pojar, Don Arioli and Grant Munro 1973 - producer
- Nutrition - documentary short, Břetislav Pojar, Don Arioli and Grant Munro 1973 - producer
- The Twitch - animated short, Al Sens 1973 - co-executive producer with Peter Jones
- Tickets s.v.p. - animated short, Pierre Perrault 1973 - executive producer
- Valley of the Moon - animated short, Ron Webber 1973 - producer
- The Family That Dwelt Apart - cartoon, Yvon Mallette 1973 - executive producer
- Man: The Polluter - animated documentary, Don Arioli, Hugh Foulds, Chuck Jones, Wolf Koenig, Kaj Pindal, Frank Nissen, Pino van Lamsweerde, Milan Blažeković, Zlatko Bourek, Dragič Dragic, Boris Kolar, Aleksandar Marks, Vladimir Jutrisa, Dušan Vukotić and Ante Zaninovic 1973 - executive producer
- Goldwood - documentary short, Kathleen Shannon 1974 - executive producer
- The Bear's Christmas - short film, Hugh Foulds 1974 - co-executive producer with Peter Jones
- Face of the Earth - documentary short, Bill Mason 1975 - executive producer
- No Apple for Johnny - animated short, John Weldon 1977 - executive producer
- Canada Vignettes: Fashion Designer - documentary short, Rosemarie Shapley and Judith Potterton 1977 - executive producer
- Canada Vignettes: Physiotherapist - documentary short, Rosemarie Shapley and Judith Potterton 1977 - executive producer
- Canada Vignettes: Bells and Brass - documentary short, Rick Butler 1978 - executive producer
- Canada Vignettes: Bill Miner - documentary short, Peter Jones 1978 - executive producer
- Canada Vignettes: Captain Cook - documentary short, Barry Helmer 1978 - executive producer
- Canada Vignettes: Crossing Guards - documentary short, Kris Paterson 1978 - executive producer
- Canada Vignettes: Faces - animated short, Paul Bochner 1978 - executive producer
- Canada Vignettes: Home of the Beaver - documentary short, Ron Webber 1978 - executive producer
- Canada Vignettes: Hudden and Dudden and Donald O'Neary: An Irish Folktale - animated short, Eva Szasz 1978 - co-executive producer with Floyd Elliott
- Canada Vignettes: Land of the Maple Leaf - documentary short, Ron Webber 1978 - co-executive producer with Floyd Elliott
- Canada Vignettes: Les nigogeux - documentary short, Robert Haché 1978 - co-producer with Paul-Eugène LeBlanc
- Canada Vignettes: Logger - documentary short, Al Sens 1978 - executive producer
- Canada Vignettes: Onions and Garlic: A Hebrew Fable - animated short film, Eva Szasz 1978 - co-executive producer with Floyd Elliott
- Canada Vignettes: Stunt Family - documentary short, Lois Siegel 1978 - co-executive producer with Kathleen Shannon
- Canada Vignettes: The Ballet Master - documentary short, Rosemarie Shapley and Judith Potterton 1978 - executive producer
- Canada Vignettes: The Dentist - documentary short, Rosemarie Shapley and Judith Potterton 1978 - executive producer
- Canada Vignettes: The Violin Maker - documentary short, Rosemarie Shapley and Judith Potterton 1978 - executive producer
- Canada Vignettes: The Photographers - documentary short, Rosemarie Shapley and Judith Potterton 1978 - executive producer
- Canada Vignettes: Veterinarian - documentary short, Rosemarie Shapley and Judith Potterton 1978 - executive producer
- Canada Vignettes: The Ham - documentary short, Ronald Blumer 1978 - executive producer
- Canada Vignettes: The Veteran - documentary short, Ronald Blumer 1978 - executive producer
- Canada Vignettes: The Maple Leaf - animated short, Paul Bochner 1978 - executive producer
- Canada Vignettes: The Performer - documentary short, Norma Bailey 1978 - executive producer
- Canada Vignettes: Toronto - documentary short, Carlos Marchiori 1978 - executive producer
- Canada Vignettes: Wild Rice Harvest Kenora - documentary short, Alanis Obomsawin 1978 - executive producer
- Canada Vignettes: Winter - Dressing Up - short film, Gerald Potterton 1978 - executive producer
- Canada Vignettes: Winter - Starting the Car - short film, Gerald Potterton 1978 - executive producer
- Oh Canada - animated short, Barrie Nelson 1978 - co-producer with Dorothy Courtois, Roman Kroitor, Wolf Koenig
- Going the Distance - documentary, Paul Cowan 1979 - co-executive producer with Jacques Bobet
- Canada Vignettes: Full Circle - documentary short, Rudi Wrench 1979 - executive producer
- Canada Vignettes: Helen Law - documentary short, Jennifer Hodge de Silva 1979 - executive producer
- Canada Vignettes: La mer enligne nos terres - documentary short, Phil Comeau 1979 - executive producer
- Canada Vignettes: Ma Chère Albertine - documentary short, Suzanne Olivier 1979 - executive producer
- Canada Vignettes: Wooly Mammoth - documentary short, 1979 - co-producer with Peter Jones
- Canada Vignettes: Wop May - documentary short, Blake James 1979 - co-executive producer with Floyd Elliott
- Canada Vignettes: June in Povungnituk - Quebec Arctic - documentary short, Alanis Obomsawin 1980 - executive producer
- Latitude 55° - feature, John Juliani 1980 - co-executive producer with Fil Fraser
- A Choice of Two - short film, John Howe 1981 - executive producer
- A Right to Refuse? - short film, Clayton Bailey 1981 - executive producer
- Arthritis: A Dialogue with Pain - documentary, Susan Huycke 1981 - co-executive producer with Roman Kroitor
- Ten Million Books: An Introduction to Farley Mowat - documentary short, Andy Thomson 1981 - executive producer
- The Man Who Discovered America - documentary short, Ralph Maud 1981 - executive producer
- 24,213,000... Impressions of the Federal Cultural Review Committee Hearings 1981, 1982 - documentary, Susan Huycke 1982 - executive producer
- An Equal Opportunity - short film, Caroline Leaf 1982 - executive producer
- End Game in Paris - short film, Veronika Soul 1982 - executive producer
- The Way It Is - short film, Beverly Shaffer 1982 - co-executive producer with Kathleen Shannon
- Military Ceremonial: An Introduction - documentary short, Dennis Sawyer 1982 - executive producer
- Next Generation - documentary short, Stephen Low 1982 - executive producer
- One Out of Three is a Fishboat - documentary short, Andy Thomson 1982 - executive producer
- The Chemistry of Fire - documentary short, Andy Thomson 1982 - executive producer
- What Do We Do Now? - documentary short, Andy Thomson 1982 - executive producer
- The Wars - feature, Robin Phillips 1982 - executive producer
- Excuse Me, But There's a Computer Asking for You - documentary short, John Howe 1983 - executive producer
- Laughter in my Soul - documentary short, Halya Kuchmij 1983 - executive producer with Roman Kroitor
- So You're Going to Buy a Boat - documentary short, Andy Thomson 1983 - executive producer
- The Tin Flute - feature, Claude Fournier 1983 - co-executive producer with Marie-José Raymond
- All the Years - short film, Don McBrearty 1984 - co-executive producer with Michael MacMillan
- One’s a Heifer - short film, Anne Wheeler 1984 - executive producer
- Democracy on Trial: The Morgentaler Affair - documentary, Paul Cowan 1984 - co-executive producer with Andy Thomson
- Incident at Restigouche - documentary, Alanis Obomsawin 1984 - co-executive producer with Adam Symansky
- John Cat - documentary short, Wolf Koenig 1984 - co-executive producer with Michael MacMillan
- Starbreaker - short film, Bruce Mackay 1984 - co-executive producer with Roman Kroitor
- A Good Tree - short film, Giles Walker 1984 - co-executive producer with Michael MacMillan
- Bambinger - short film, Douglas Jackson 1984 - co-executive producer with Michael MacMillan
- The Painted Door - short film, Bruce Pittman 1984 - co-executive producer with Michael MacMillan
- The Masculine Mystique - feature, John N. Smith and Giles Walker 1984 - co-executive producer with Andy Thomson
- Unfinished Business - feature, Don Owen 1984 - co-executive producer with Don Haig and Douglas Dales
- River Journey - documentary short, IMAX, John N. Smith 1984 - executive producer
- Cages - short film, Michael J. F. Scott 1984 - co-executive producer with Michael MacMillan
- The Cap - short film, Robert Duncan 1984 - co-executive producer with Michael MacMillan
- Bayo - feature, Mort Ransen 1984 - co-executive producer with Andy Thomson
- Richard Cardinal: Cry from a Diary of a Métis Child - documentary short, Alanis Obomsawin 1986 - co-producer with Alanis Obomsawin and Marrin Canell
- Poundmaker's Lodge: A Healing Place - documentary short, Alanis Obomsawin 1987 - co-producer with Alanis Obomsawin and Marrin Canell
- Professor Norman Cornett: "Since when do we divorce the right answer from an honest answer? - documentary, Alanis Obomsawin 2009 - co-producer with Adam Symansky

== Awards ==
A is for Architecture (1960)

- Yorkton Film Festival, Yorkton, Saskatchewan: Golden Sheaf Award, First Prize, 1960
- 12th Canadian Film Awards, Toronto: Genie Award for Best Film, General Information, 1960
- Columbus International Film & Animation Festival, Columbus, Ohio: Chris Award, First Prize, 1962
- Ibero-American-Filipino Documentary Film Contest, Bilbao, Spain: Special CIDALC Prize, Silver Medal, 1960
- International Exhibition of Electronics, Nuclear Energy, Radio, Television and Cinema, Trieste, Italy: Silver Cup, 1960
- Rapallo International Film Festival, Rapallo, Italy: Third Prize - Silver Cup and Medal, 1960
- Yorkton Film Festival, Yorkton, Saskatchewan: Certificate of Merit, 1960

Hors-d'oeuvre (1960)

- 13th Canadian Film Awards: Award of Merit, Sales and Promotion, 1961

The Great Toy Robbery (1963)

- Cork International Film Festival, Cork, Ireland: First Prize - Statuette of St. Finbarr, Animated Film and Cartoon 1963
- Belgrade Documentary and Short Film Festival, Belgrade: Diploma of Merit, 1964
- Landers Associates Annual Awards, Los Angeles: Award of Merit, 1969

The Drag (1965)

- Calvin Workshop Awards, Kansas City, Missouri: Notable Film Award, 1966
- Columbus International Film & Animation Festival, Columbus, Ohio: Chris Certificate, 1967
- International Festival of Red Cross and Health Films, Varna, Bulgaria: Silver Medal, 1969
- 39th Academy Awards, Los Angeles: Nominee: Best Short Subject, Cartoons, 1967

What on Earth! (1966)

- International Science Fiction Film Festival, Trieste: Silver Seal of the City of Trieste, 1967
- Salerno Film Festival, Salerno: Minister of Entertainment Cup, 1970
- American Film and Video Festival, New York: Blue Ribbon, 1971
- 40th Academy Awards, Los Angeles: Nominee: Best Short Subject, Cartoons, 1968

Alphabet (1966)

- International Festival of Documentary and Short Film of Bilbao, Bilbao: Special Prize of the Ministry of National Education, 1968
- La Plata International Children's Film Festival, La Plata, Argentina: Silver Medal 1968
- Annecy International Animated Film Festival, Annecy: Special Jury Prize, 1967

Energy and Matter (1966)

- 21st British Academy Film Awards: BAFTA Award for Best Specialised Film, 1968
- International Festival of Didactic Films, Beirut: Gold Medal, 1980
- Roshd International Film Festival, Tehran: Golden Book Trophy - Category: Primary School Film Group, 1993
- Cork International Film Festival, Cork, Ireland: Certificate of Merit, Scientific and Educational Film, 1966

Around Perception (1968)

- International Exhibition of Scientific Film, Buenos Aires: Silver Medal, 1970
- Vancouver International Film Festival, Vancouver: Certificate of Merit, 1969

Cosmic Zoom (1968)

- Ibero-American Documentary Film. Festival, Bilbao: Gold Medal, 1969
- Trieste Science+Fiction Festival, Trieste: Golden Seal of the City of Trieste, 1969
- International Educational Film Festival, Tehran: Certificate of Merit, Scientific Films, 1969
- International Exhibition of Scientific Film, Buenos Aires: Diploma of Honor, 1970
- International Festival of Short Films, Philadelphia: Award for Exceptional Merit, 1970
- UNIATEC International Technical Film Competition, Berlin: Award of Excellence 1972

Boomsville(1968)

- Israeli Film Festival, Tel Aviv: Certificate of Merit, 1969

King Size (1968)

- International Festival of Documentary and Short Film of Bilbao, Bilbao: Silver Medal, 1969
- International Festival of Documentary and Short Film of Bilbao, Bilbao: Diploma of Honour, 1969

Population Explosion (1968)

- Columbus International Film & Animation Festival, Columbus, Ohio: Chris Certificate, education, 1968
- International Exhibition of Scientific Film, Buenos Aires: Second Prize, Information, 1969

To See or Not to See (1969)

- Berlin International Film Festival, Berlin: Golden Bear for Best Short Film, 1969
- Chicago International Film Festival, Chicago: Certificate of Merit, 1969
- International Cinematography Congress, Colour Film Week, Barcelona: Diploma of Honour, 1969
- 22nd Canadian Film Awards, Toronto: Film of the Year, 1970
- 22nd Canadian Film Awards, Toronto: Best Animated Film, 1970
- International Film Festival in Guadalajara, Guadalajara: Award for Animation, 1971
- American Film and Video Festival, New York: Blue Ribbon, 1971
- SODRE International Festival of Documentary and Experimental Films, Montevideo, Uruguay: First Prize, Experimental, 1971

Little Red Riding Hood (1969)

- Venice Film Festival, Venice: Silver Medal, 1969

Ashes of Doom (1970)

- International Festival of Short Films, Philadelphia: Award for Exceptional Merit, 1971

Doodle Film (1970)

- Chicago International Film Festival, Chicago: Certificate of Outstanding Merit, 1971
- Atlanta Film Festival: Silver Medal, Harmony of Man, 1972

What is Life? (1970)

- Columbus International Film & Animation Festival, Columbus, Ohio: Chris Award, First Prize, 1972

Evolution (1971)

- 23rd Canadian Film Awards, Toronto: Best Animated Film, 1971
- 44th Academy Awards, Los Angeles: Nominee: Best Animated Film, Short Subject, 1972

Citizen Harold (1971)

- U.S. International Animation Film Festival, New York: Certificate of Merit, Education, 1972
- Columbus International Film & Animation Festival, Columbus, Ohio: Bronze Plaque, 1973
- Melbourne Film Festival, Melbourne: Diploma of Merit, 1973

Hot Stuff (1971)

- International Animation Film Festival, New York: Grand Prix - Silver Praxinoscope, Educational, 1972
- World Festival of Animated Films, Zagreb: Best Educational Film, 1972
- Atlanta Film Festival: Gold Medal, Safety, 1972
- Melbourne Film Festival, Melbourne: Diploma of Merit, 1972
- International Short Film Festival Oberhausen, Oberhausen, Germany: Diploma of the International Council of Graphic Design Associations, 1972
- National Committee on Films for Safety, Chicago: Bronze Plaque, 1972

In a Nutshell (1971)

- Festival of Agricultural & Rural Films/Santarém International Film Festival, Santarém, Portugal: Silver Trophy, 1972

The Men in the Park (1971)

- International Film Festival in Guadalajara, Guadalajara: Second Award, 1972

Hard Rider (1972)

- American Film and Video Festival, New York: Red Ribbon, 1974

180 is Max (1972)

- International Review of Cinema and Television Films on Flying, Milan: Diploma and Plaque, 1974

Tilt (1972)

- Annual Conference of the American Institute of Planners, Atlanta: Special Award of Excellence, 1973
- Columbus International Film & Animation Festival, Columbus, Ohio: Bronze Plaque, 1975

The Underground Movie (1972)

- Adelaide Film Festival Youth, Adelaide: Certificate of Merit, 1974

The Family That Dwelt Apart (1973)

- Chicago International Film Festival, Chicago: Silver Hugo, 1973
- 25th Canadian Film Awards, Montreal: Best Animated Film, 1973
- 47th Academy Awards, Los Angeles: Nominee: Best Animated Short Film, 1975

The Twitch (1973)

- Melbourne Film Festival, Melbourne: Diploma of Merit, Animation, 1976

Face of the Earth (1975)

- American Film and Video Festival, New York: Blue Ribbon, High Curriculum Films: Science, 1977
- American Instructional Film Festival, Cleveland: Certificate of Recognition, Clarity and Correlation to Curriculum Area, 1980

Canada Vignettes: Faces (1978)

- Columbus International Film & Animation Festival, Columbus, Ohio: Bronze Plaque, 1984
- American Film and Video Festival, New York: Red Ribbon, Visual Essays, 1984
- U.S. International Film and Video Festival, Redondo Beach, California: Gold Camera Award, 1984

Canada Vignettes: The Performer (1978)

- 33rd Cannes Film Festival, Cannes: Jury Prize, 1980

Going the Distance (1979)

- C.I.D.A.L.C. International Festival of Sports Films, Turin: First Prize, Gold Plaque, 1982
- Commonwealth Television and Film Festival, Nicosia: Best Film of the Festival, 1980
- 52nd Academy Awards, Los Angeles: Nominee: Best Documentary Feature, 1980

A Right to Refuse? (1981)

- American Film and Video Festival, New York: Red Ribbon, Business and Industry, 1983

The Way It Is (1982)

- Learning A-V Magazine – Award for Outstanding Educational Film, 1984
- National Council on Family Relations Conference, Minneapolis: Honorable Mention, 1984

One Out of Three is a Fishboat (1982)

- National Committee on Films for Safety, Chicago: Certificate of Merit, 1983

Democracy on Trial: The Morgentaler Affair (1984)

- Prix Europa, Berlin: Futura Berlin Award, Documentary Film, 1987

A Good Tree (1984)

- Chicago International Film Festival, Chicago: Silver Hugo Award, Short Subject, Drama, 1984
- Chicago International Children's Film Festival, Chicago: First Prize, Live Action Under 30 Minutes, 1986
- 15th ACTRA Awards, Toronto: Nellie Award for Best Children’s Television Program, 1986

The Masculine Mystique (1984)

- American Film and Video Festival, New York: Red Ribbon, Contemporary Concerns, Feature, 1985

The Painted Door (1984)

- Yorkton Film Festival, Yorkton, Saskatchewan: Golden Sheaf Award, Best Drama Under 30 Minutes, 1985
- Columbus International Film & Animation Festival, Columbus, Ohio: Chris Award, Arts and Culture, 1986
- 57th Academy Awards, Los Angeles: Nominee: Best Live Action Short Film, 1984

Richard Cardinal: Cry from a Diary of a Métis Child (1986)

- American Indian Film Festival, San Francisco: First Prize, Best Documentary, 1986
- American Film and Video Festival, New York: Red Ribbon, Current Concerns, 1988
- National Educational Film and Video Festival, Oakland, California: Crystal Apple, Human Relations, Teen Suicide, 1989
- Pärnu International Documentary and Anthropology Film Festival, Pärnu: Special Award, Educational Visual Anthropology of Children and Youth 1991

Poundmaker's Lodge: A Healing Place (1987)

- Columbus International Film & Animation Festival, Columbus, Ohio: Honorable Mention - Category: Health and Medicine / Addiction, Alcohol, Drugs and Tobacco, 1988
- National Educational Film and Video Festival, Oakland, California: Bronze Apple, Health/Drug and Alcohol Addiction, 1991
