= 1923 in animation =

Events in 1923 in animation.

== Events ==
=== July ===
- July 15: The Felix the Cat cartoon Felix in Hollywood is released, in which Felix meets various caricatures of Hollywood stars.

=== October ===
- October 16: After the Laugh-O-Gram Studio has been declared bankrupt, The Disney Brothers Cartoon Studio (later renamed the Walt Disney Company) is founded by Walt and Roy O. Disney. Ub Iwerks is also back as the studio's main animator and the Alice Comedies series is in production.

=== Specific date unknown ===
- Curt Wolfram Kieslich adapts Wilhelm Busch's comic book Max und Moritz into an animated short.

== Films released ==
- Unknown date:
  - Day at the Park (United States)
  - Martha (United States)
  - On the Air (United States)
  - Wedding Bells (United States)
- 1 January – Felix the Ghost Breaker view (United States)
- 14 January – Colonel Heeza Liar And The Ghost (United States)
- 15 January – Felix Win's Out view [sic] (United States)
- 1 February – Colonel Heeza Liar, Detective (United States)
- 8 February – The Einstein Theory of Relativity (United States)
- 17 February – The Traveling Salesman (United States)
- 23 February – Farmer Al Falfa's Bride (United States)
- 11 March – Colonel Heeza Liar's Burglar (United States)
- 22 March – One Hard Pull (United States)
- 8 April – Day by Day in Every Way (United States)
- 15 April – Felix Tries for Treasure view (United States)
- 27 April – Amateur Night on the Ark (United States)
- 1 May – Felix Revolts view (United States)
- 12 May – Springtime (United States)
- 15 May – Felix Calms His Conscience (United States)
- 1 June – Felix the Globe Trotter (United States)
- 3 June – Colonel Heeza Liar In The African Jungles (United States)
- 15 June – Felix Gets Broadcasted view (United States)
- 1 July – Felix Strikes it Rich view (United States)
- 8 July – Colonel Heeza Liar In Uncle Tom's Cabin (United States)
- 15 July – Felix in Hollywood view (United States)
- 19 July – Marathon Dancer (United States)
- 1 August – Felix in Fairyland view (United States)
- 5 August – Colonel Heeza Liar's Vacation (United States)
- 15 August – Felix Laughs Last (United States)
- 30 September – Felix and the Radio (United States)
- 1 November – Colonel Heeza Liar's Forbidden Fruit (United States)
- 9 November – Farmer Al Falfa's Pet Cat (United States)
- 15 November – Felix Fills a Shortage (United States)
- 1 December:
  - Colonel Heeza Liar, Strikebreaker (United States)
  - Felix the Goat-Getter (United States)
- 15 December – Felix Goes A-Hunting view (United States)

== Births ==
=== January ===
- January 8: Larry Storch, American actor and comedian (voice of Cool Cat, Merlin the Magic Mouse, Second Banana and Colonel Rimfire in Looney Tunes, Koko the Clown in Out of the Inkwell, Phineas J. Whoopee in Tennessee Tuxedo and His Tales, The Joker in The Adventures of Batman and The New Scooby-Doo Movies, Drac, Hagatha, Ghoulihand, Batso, Ratso and Icky in Groovie Goolies, Mr. Mendelbaum and Herbert Finagle in Garfield and Friends), (d. 2022).
- January 19:
  - Bob McFadden, American actor (voice of Franken Berry in the Monster Cereals commercials, the title character in Cool McCool, Jingle Bells in The Year Without a Santa Claus, Snarf in ThunderCats), (d. 2000).
  - Jean Stapleton, American actress (voice of Mrs. Jenkins in Pocahontas II: Journey to a New World), (d. 2013).
- January 21: Paul Kligman, Romanian-born Canadian actor (voice of J. Jonah Jameson in Spider-Man, Donner in Rudolph the Red-Nosed Reindeer, Friar Tuck in Rocket Robin Hood, Red Skull and Thunderbolt Ross in The Marvel Super Heroes), (d. 1985).
- January 22: Fred Peters, American animator and comics artist (Walt Disney Company), (d. 2018).
- January 24: Vlado Kristl, Yugoslavian-Croatian film director and animator (Don Kihot), (d. 2004).
- January 29: Andrea Bresciani, Slovenian-Italian animator and comics artist (Hanna-Barbera), (d. 2006).

=== February ===
- February 17: Kathleen Freeman, American actress (voice of Eugenia Kisskillya in Detention, Mrs. Gordon in As Told by Ginger, Mrs. Crackshell in DuckTales, Elder #1 in FernGully: The Last Rainforest, Ma in the Chip 'n Dale: Rescue Rangers episode "Short Order Crooks", Mrs. Evans in The Real Adventures of Jonny Quest episode "Return of the Anasazi", Greta in the Cow and Chicken episode "Sumo Cow", Ma Mayhem in the Batman Beyond episode "The Eggbaby"), (d. 2001).
- February 15: Keene Curtis, American actor (voice of Lord Balthazar in The Smurfs, the Pastmaster in SWAT Kats: The Radical Squadron), (d. 2002).
- February 18: Allen Melvin, American actor (voice of Magilla Gorilla), (d. 2008).
- February 19: Marshall Barer, American lyricist, librettist, singer, songwriter and director (Mighty Mouse theme), (d. 1998).
- February 24: Fred Steiner, American conductor, orchestrator, film historian, arranger and composer (The Adventures of Rocky and Bullwinkle and Friends, Tiny Toon Adventures), (d. 2011).
- February 28: Charles Durning, American actor (voice of Francis Griffin in Family Guy, Arch the Archelon in The Land Before Time IV: Journey Through the Mists, Grandfather in The Butter Battle Book), (d. 2012).

=== March ===
- March 6: Ed McMahon, American announcer, game show host, comedian, actor, singer and combat aviator (voice of Engineer's Henchman in the Bruno the Kid episode "Bullet Train", Governor #1, Eugene Oregon and Beaver #5 in the I Am Weasel episode "I Am Ambassador", Announcer in The Angry Beavers episode "I Dare You", Tug Boat Captain Hero in the Higglytown Heroes episode "Ship Ahoy!", himself in the Pinky and the Brain episode "The Pinky and the Brain Reunion Special", The Simpsons episode "Treehouse of Horror IX", the Family Guy episode "When You Wish Upon a Weinstein", and the Duck Dodgers episode "Back to the Academy"), (d. 2009).
- March 16: Joyce Carlson, American artist (Walt Disney Animation Studios), (d. 2008).

=== April ===
- April 13: Don Adams, American actor and comedian (voice of Tennessee Tuxedo in Tennessee Tuxedo and His Tales, the title character in Inspector Gadget, Gadget Boy in Gadget Boy & Heather, Principal Hickey in Pepper Ann, himself in The New Scooby-Doo Movies episode "The Exterminator"), (d. 2005).
- April 16: Walter Bien, American film producer (Tom and Jerry, Rod Rocket), (d. 2008).
- April 20: Tito Puente, American musician, songwriter, bandleader and record producer (voiced himself in The Simpsons episode "Who Shot Mr. Burns?"), (d. 2000).
- April 24: Red Coffey, American comedian and actor (voice of Quacker in Tom & Jerry), (d. 1988).
- April 25:
  - Grant Munro, Canadian animator and film director (Neighbours), (d. 2017).
  - Paul Whitsun-Jones, Welsh actor (voice of Mr. Fezziwig in A Christmas Carol), (d. 1974).
- April 28: Dorris Bergstrom, American animator (Walt Disney Animation Studios, Hanna-Barbera, The U.S. of Archie, The Tom and Jerry Comedy Show, The Lord of the Rings, Warner Bros. Animation, The Grinch Grinches the Cat in the Hat, It's Flashbeagle, Charlie Brown, The Chipmunk Adventure), (d. 2020).
- April 30: Al Lewis, American actor (voice of Grandpa Munster in The Mini-Munsters, the Godfather in Coonskin), (d. 2006).

=== May ===
- May 1: Ion Popescu-Gopo, Romanian graphic artist, animator and film director (Scurtă Istorie, The White Moor, Gopo's Little Man), (d. 1989).
- May 9:
  - Gino Gavioli, Italian comics artist and animator (Gamma Film, Ulisse e l'Ombra, Caio Gregorio er guardiano der pretorio, Il vigile, Babbut, Mammut e Figliut, Derby, Capitan Trinchetto, Joe Galassia, Serafino spazza antennino, Tacabanda, Cimabue), (d. 2016).
  - Connie Russell, American singer and actress (singing voice of Red in "Red Hot Riding Hood"), (d. 1990).
- May 20: Steve Krantz, American film producer and writer (Spider-Man, Fritz the Cat, The Nine Lives of Fritz the Cat, Heavy Traffic), (d. 2007).
- May 26: Roy Dotrice, English actor (voice of Destroyer in Spider-Man, Frederick in the Batman: The Animated Series episode "The Lion and the Unicorn", narrator in The Prince and the Pauper), (d. 2017).
- May 27:
  - Henry Kissinger, German-born American politician and diplomat (voice of Ducky Daddles in the Happily Ever After: Fairy Tales for Every Child episode "Henny Penny"), (d. 2023).
  - Alfonso Wong, Chinese comics artist and animator (Old Master Q), (d. 2017).
- May 29: Harry Everett Smith, American experimental filmmaker (Early Abstractions, Heaven and Earth Magic), (d. 1991).

=== June ===
- June 14: Władysław Nehrebecki, Polish animator and television director (Bolek and Lolek), (d. 1978).
- June 30: Carl Ritchie, American actor (voice of Bert the Turtle in Duck and Cover), (d. 2015).

=== July ===
- July 5: Eunice Macaulay, British animator and film producer (Special Delivery), (d. 2013).
- July 8: Val Bettin, American actor (voice of Dr. David Dawson in The Great Mouse Detective, the Sultan in the Aladdin franchise, Bishop in Shrek), (d. 2021).
- July 13: Norma Zimmer, American actress (voice of White Rose in Alice in Wonderland), (d. 2011).
- July 25:
  - Estelle Getty, American actress and comedian (voice of Mrs. Hennypecker in The Sissy Duckling, Aunt Jane in the Duckman episode "Westward, No!"), (d. 2008).
  - Allan Lurie, American actor (voice of Mezmaron in Pac-Man, Uglor in Space Stars), (d. 2015).
- July 26: Jan Berenstain, American children's book author and illustrator (co-creator of The Berenstain Bears), (d. 2012).
- July 28: Ray Ellis, American record producer, arranger, conductor and composer (Filmation, Spider-Man, Eight Crazy Nights), (d. 2008).
- July 31: Kent Rogers, American actor (voice of Beaky Buzzard and Junior Bear in Looney Tunes, continued voice of Woody Woodpecker), (d. 1944).

=== August ===
- August 9: John Stephenson, American actor (voice of Mr. Slate in The Flintstones, Dr. Benton Quest in the first 5 episodes of Jonny Quest, various characters in the Scooby-Doo franchise, Fancy-Fancy in Top Cat, Doctor Doom and Magneto in The New Fantastic Four, X the Eliminator in Birdman and the Galaxy Trio, Colossus, Doctor Strange, and Loki in Spider-Man and His Amazing Friends, Huffer, Windcharger, Thundercracker, Alpha Trion, and Kup in The Transformers, continued voice of Doggie Daddy), (d. 2015).
- August 14: Alice Ghostley, American actress (voice of Cassiopeia in Hercules, Cariba in Izzy's Quest for Olympic Gold, Hester Hen in the 101 Dalmatians: The Series episode "De-Vil Age Elder", Pandora Rickets in the Channel Umptee-3 episode "The U.F.O. Show"), (d. 2007).
- August 15: Rose Marie, American actress, singer, and comedian (voice of Agatha Caulfield in the Hey Arnold! episode "Crabby Author", Mrs. Spengler in The Real Ghostbusters episode "Ghostworld", Lotta Litter in the Yogi's Gang episode "Lotta Litter", Honna in the Freakazoid! episode "Lawn Gnomes: Chapter IV – Fun in the Sun"), (d. 2017).
- August 29:
  - Peg Dixon, Canadian actress (voice of Mrs. Claus in Rudolph the Red-Nosed Reindeer, Betty Brant in Spider-Man), (d. 2015).
  - Jean Ache, French animator and comics artist (L'Émule de Tartarin, Callisto le petite nymphe, Anatole Fait Du Camping), (d. 1985).

=== September ===
- September 8: Gloria Wood, American actress and singer (voice of Nelly in Nelly's Folly, Suzy Sparrow in Toot, Whistle, Plunk and Boom), (d. 1995).
- September 23: Jimmy Weldon, American actor (voice of Yakky Doodle in The Yogi Bear Show, Solomon Grundy in Challenge of the Superfriends), (d. 2023).
- September 28: William Windom, American actor (voice of Puppetino in Pinocchio and the Emperor of the Night, Dr. Marcus Wealthy in Pink Panther and Sons, "Cutter" King in Sky Commanders, Uncle Chuck in Sonic the Hedgehog, Uncle Bob in the Goof Troop episode "Major Goof", Ethan Clark in the Batman: The Animated Series episode "Prophecy of Doom"), (d. 2012).
- September 29: Stan Berenstain, American children's book author and illustrator (co-creator of The Berenstain Bears), (d. 2005).

=== October ===
- October 4: Charlton Heston, American actor (narrated Energy: A National Issue, Noel, and Hercules, voice of Judah Ben-Hur in Ben-Hur), (d. 2008).
- October 5: Glynis Johns, British actress (portrayed Winifred Banks in Mary Poppins, voice of Mrs. Grimwood in Scooby-Doo and the Ghoul School, Swallow in The Happy Prince, Darjeeling in the ABC Weekend Special The Secret Garden), (d. 2024).
- October 7: Břetislav Pojar, Czech puppeteer, animator and film director (To See or Not to See, Balablok), (d. 2012).
- October 21: Walerian Borowczyk, Polish film director and animator (Renaissance, Jeux des Anges, Théâtre de Monsieur & Madame Kabal, Les Astronautes), (d. 2006).
- October 30: Herschel Bernardi, American actor (voice of Charlie the Tuna and The Jolly Green Giant), (d. 1986).

=== November ===
- November 12: Ernie Anderson, American radio and television personality, horror host, and announcer (narrated Jayce and the Wheeled Warriors, The Adventures of Super Mario Bros. 3, 2 episodes of Animaniacs, The Powerpuff Girls shorts for What a Cartoon!), (d. 1997).
- November 19: Mike Sekowsky, American comics artist, writer and animator (Hanna-Barbera), (d. 1989).

=== December ===
- December 1:
  - Dick Shawn, American actor and comedian (voice of Snow Miser in The Year Without a Santa Claus), (d. 1987).
  - Morris, Belgian comics artist and animation director (co-director of Daisy Town and The Ballad of the Daltons), (d. 2001).
- December 2: Miroslav Štěpánek, Czech animator, film director, sculptor, screenwriter, illustrator and graphic designer (Pojďte pane, budeme si hrát, aka Hey Mister, Let's Play!), (d. 2005).
- December 6: Maury Laws, American composer (Rankin/Bass), (d. 2019).
- December 7: Ted Knight, American actor (voice of Commander Jonathan Kidd in Fantastic Voyage, Black Manta in The Superman/Aquaman Hour of Adventure, Commissioner Gordon, The Penguin, The Riddler, Mr. Freeze, Scarecrow, and The Mad Hatter in The Adventures of Batman, narrator and The Flash in Super Friends, Ben Turner in Lassie's Rescue Rangers, Carter Winston/Vendorian in the Star Trek: The Animated Series episode "The Survivor"), (d. 1986).
- December 10: Harold Gould, American actor (voice of Old Denahi in Brother Bear, Shiro Nishi in Whisper of the Heart, Benjamin in The Greatest Adventure: Stories from the Bible episode "The Miracle of Jesus"), (d. 2010).
- December 12:
  - Bob Barker, American game show host (voice of Bob Barnacle in the SpongeBob SquarePants episode "Sanctuary!", himself in the Futurama episode "The Lesser of Two Evils", and the Family Guy episodes "Screwed the Pooch", "The Fat Guy Strangler" and "Tales of a Third Grade Nothing"), (d. 2023).
  - Bob Dorough, American jazz musician, songwriter and composer (Schoolhouse Rock), (d. 2018).

=== Specific date unknown ===
- Jack Keil, American advertising executive (creator and voice of McGruff the Crime Dog), (d. 2017).
