= 22nd Canadian Film Awards =

Canadian film awards ceremony

- Date: October 3, 1970
- Location: Imperial Theatre, Toronto, Ontario
- Hosted by: Bill Walker

Highlights
- Most awards: The Act of the Heart
- Film of the Year: Psychocratie (To See or Not to See)
- Best Feature Film: Goin' Down the Road

The 22nd Canadian Film Awards were held on October 3, 1970 to honour achievements in Canadian film. The ceremony was hosted by broadcaster Bill Walker.

With the goal of broadening public awareness of the awards, the organizers moved the ceremony back into a theatre, with a section reserved for the general public. They also initiated the enormously popular Film Award Week which allowed the public to join the international jury in screening the nominated films. After reviewing 125 entries, the judges presented the international jury with 65 nominees. Cinepix Film Properties withdrew the films Love in a Four Letter World and Here and Now (L'Initiation) after an article in Time implied that the jury was unsympathetic to the films' sexual content. Jean Pierre Lefebvre threatened to withdraw the film Q-Bec My Love if the Ontario Censor Board did not withdraw its demand for the film's explicit sexuality to be edited; provincial cabinet minister James Auld intervened to dissuade the board from insisting on the cuts.

== Winners ==
=== Films ===
- Film of the Year: Psychocratie (To See or Not to See) - National Film Board of Canada, Robert Verrall and Wolf Koenig producers, Břetislav Pojar director
- Feature Film: Goin' Down the Road - Evdon Films, Donald Shebib producer and director
- Film Under 30 Minutes: Blake - National Film Board of Canada, Douglas Jackson producer, Bill Mason director
- Film Over 30 Minutes: A Matter of Fat - National Film Board of Canada, Desmond Dew producer, William Weintraub director
- Documentary Under 30 Minutes: KW+ - Onyx Films, Hydro-Québec, Aimée Danis director
- Documentary Over 30 Minutes: The Nature of Things: Wild Africa - Canadian Broadcasting Corporation, William Banting and John Livingston producers and directors
- Animated: Psychocratie (To See or Not to See) - National Film Board of Canada, Robert Verrall and Wolf Koenig producers, Břetislav Pojar director
- Arts and Experimental: Legend - National Film Board of Canada, Tom Daly producer, Rick Raxlen director
- TV Drama: Not awarded
- TV Information: A Little Fellow from Gambo - The Joey Smallwood Story - National Film Board of Canada, Julian Biggs producer and director
- Travel and Recreation: The Sun Don't Shine on the Same Dawg's Back All the Time - Crawley Films, F. R. Crawley producer
- Public Relations: A Hospital Is... - Crawley Films, James Turpie producer and director
- Sales Promotion: Home Sweet Cedar - Canawest Film Productions

=== Feature Film Craft Awards ===
- Performance by a Lead Actor: Paul Bradley and Doug McGrath - Goin' Down the Road (Evdon Films)
- Performance by a Lead Actress: Geneviève Bujold - The Act of the Heart (Quest Film Productions)
- Supporting Actor: Gratien Gélinas - Red (Onyx Films)
- Supporting Actress: Fernande Giroux - Red (Onyx Films)
- Art Direction: Anne Pritchard - The Act of the Heart (Quest Film Productions)
- Cinematography: Bernard Chentrier - Red (Quest Film Productions)
- Direction: Paul Almond - The Act of the Heart (Quest Film Productions)
- Film Editing: Christopher Cordeaux - Prologue (NFB)
- Sound Editing: Jean-Pierre Joutel and John Knight - The Act of the Heart (Quest Film Productions)
- Music Score: Harry Freedman - The Act of the Heart (Quest Film Productions)
- Original Screenplay: William Fruet - Goin' Down the Road (Evdon Films)
- Overall Sound: David Howells, Ron Alexander and Roger Lamoureux - The Act of the Heart (Quest Film Productions)

=== Non-Feature Craft Awards ===
- Performance by a Lead Actor: Joey Smallwood - A Little Fellow from Gambo - The Joey Smallwood Story (NFB)
- Performance by a Lead Actress: Linda Goranson - The Manipulators: The Spike in the Wall (CBC)
- Black-and-White Cinematography: Paul Leach - Mrs. Case (NFB)
- Colour Cinematography: Robert Ennis - Multiplicity (Crawley Films)
- Direction: Julian Biggs - A Little Fellow from Gambo - The Joey Smallwood Story (NFB)
- Editing: Yves Langlois - 7 fois... par jour (France Film, Steiner Films)
- Sound Editing: Lucien Marleau - Fields of Space (NFB)
- Musical Score: Eldon Rathburn - Fields of Space (NFB)
- Screenplay: Ian McNeill - Freud: The Hidden Nature of Man (International Cinemedia Center)
- Non-Dramatic Script: Bill Davies - The Oshawa Kid (NFB)
- Sound Recording: Jacques Duran - Activator One (NFB)
- Sound Re-Recording: Ron Alexander and Michel Descombes - Activator One (NFB)

=== Special awards ===
- Michael Rubbo - "for reportage in Sad Song of Yellow Skin" (NFB)
- Challenge for Change Unit - "for reportage in You Are on Indian Land" (NFB)
- Peter Rowe - most promising newcomer for The Neon Palace (Allan King Associates)
- CPFL Broadcasting - "for courageous screen journalism in The Erie Report"
- Wendy Michener Award: Jean Pierre Lefebvre "for outstanding artistic achievement"
- John Drainie Award: Harry J. Boyle "for distinguished service to broadcasting"
