= What on Earth! (film) =

- Directed by: Kaj Pindal; Les Drew
- Written by: Kaj Pindal
- Produced by: Robert Verrall; Wolf Koenig
- Narrated by: Donald Brittain
- Music by: Donald Douglas
- Production company: National Film Board of Canada
- Distributed by: National Film Board of Canada; Columbia Pictures
- Release date: 1966
- Running time: 9 min 35 s
- Country: Canada
- Languages: English, French

What on Earth! (French: La Terre est habitée!) is a 1966 National Film Board of Canada animated short co-directed by Les Drew and Kaj Pindal. The film is a mockumentary, introduced in its opening credits as produced by the "National Film Board of Mars" that takes a humorous look at car culture from the point of view of fictional Martians, who mistake automobiles for Earth's true inhabitants and people as their parasites. It attempts to examine the sociology of the automobile as the dominant species on Earth, and makes wild guesses about the lifestyle, feeding habits, mating habits and funeral rites of this "species".

== Plot ==
Presented as a documentary by the National Film Board of Mars, the film shows Earth from the view of an orbiting Martian spaceship. The spaceship did not land (Earth's oxygen atmosphere is toxic to Martians), but it did use cameras to capture footage of intelligent life on earth: the humble automobile.

A subject is shown at his carefully-regulated dinner (a gas pump), before returning to shelter for the night (a garage). The next morning, he is seen traveling on a local highway before getting stuck in a traffic jam at the road's abrupt end. The earthlings apparently enjoy a life of "all play and no work" and tolerate nothing that impairs their "smooth, fast life"; the slowdown causes significant complaints (honking) until workers (construction vehicles) arrive to extend the road, namely by demolishing a mountain in the road's path and building a bridge over a chasm.

The presence of many earthlings in traffic is presumed to come from a need for companionship, as well a desire to dance and play games with each other. While they occasionally stop to chat, lag is regulated by social directors (traffic signals). This fun also creates exhaustion (accidents and pile-ups), leading one subject to be towed to a medical center (repair shop) and spa (car wash). Libraries (road signs and billboards) and audio-visual centers (drive-in theaters) are readily available.

When they get too old, earthlings move to retirement parks (used-car lots), where they perform their final act: they instruct a worker to perform euthanasia (using a car crusher) so that they can reproduce. Earthlings have eliminated sex altogether; instead, they are recycled at breeding centers (car factories), which newborn Earthlings emerge from, fully grown. The Martians were unable to get footage inside a breeding center, so the audience is instead shown a version created by Martian scientists: a Rube Goldberg machine which converts crushed cars into a putty-like substance and then re-shapes them into new cars.

The Martians are perplexed by one aspect of earthling society: despite their advancement, the earthlings have not eliminated parasites (humans and pets). In addition to infesting the earthlings, the pests also build elaborate hives (buildings and cities) which slow down the earthlings' travel. The film ends with the Martians' hope that they will soon be able to send visitors to meet with the earthlings.

== Production ==
The film was first proposed at the NFB by Pindal in December 1963, with the working title Automation, with the intention of showing how "in spite of appearances, man is the master in the automated world." The working title would become Martians, before the final title What on Earth! was chosen. Drew was brought in to work on the film in 1965 and 1966, with Brittain assigned to write narration. Pindal's original idea of "man as the master" is not reflected in the final version of the film, and NFB archivist and blogger Albert Ohayon believes Brittain may have been responsible for this key change.

== Release ==
What on Earth! was completed in late 1966 and shown to distributors including Columbia Pictures, which purchased international theatrical rights in January 1967. Following a successful theatrical run, the film was sold to approximately 30 networks around the world, beginning in 1969. TV sales included CBC-TV in Canada and the ABC TV network in the US. The ABC sale was for seven animated shorts, including Walking, Cosmic Zoom and Hot Stuff, and marked the first time NFB films had been sold to a major American television network. The films aired on ABC in the fall of 1971 as part of the children's television show Curiosity Shop, executive produced by Chuck Jones.

== Awards ==
- International Science Fiction Film Festival, Trieste: Silver Seal of the City of Trieste, 1967
- Salerno Film Festival, Salerno: Minister of Entertainment Cup, 1970
- American Film and Video Festival, New York: Blue Ribbon, 1971
- 40th Academy Awards, Los Angeles: Nominee: Best Short Subject, Cartoons, 1968
