= Miroslav Štěpánek =

Miroslav Štěpánek may refer to:

- Miroslav Štěpánek (footballer) (born 1990), Czech footballer
- Miroslav Štěpánek (artist) (1930–2005), Czech artist
