= Red (1970 film) =

- Directed by: Gilles Carle
- Written by: Clément Perron
- Produced by: Pierre Lamy
- Starring: Daniel Pilon; Geneviève Deloir; Gratien Gélinas; Fernande Giroux
- Cinematography: Bernard Chentrier
- Edited by: Yves Langlois
- Music by: Pierre F. Brault
- Production companies: Famous Players; Onyx Films
- Release date: March 27, 1970
- Running time: 101 minutes
- Country: Canada
- Language: French

Red, also known in some releases as Red the Half-Breed, is a 1970 Canadian drama film, directed by Gilles Carle. An exploration of anti-indigenous racism, the film stars Daniel Pilon as Reginald "Red" Mackenzie, the Métis half-brother of an otherwise all-white family of siblings, who becomes the primary suspect when his sister Elizabeth (Fernande Giroux), the wife of wealthy car dealer Frédéric Barnabé (Gratien Gélinas), is murdered.

The film's cast also includes Geneviève Deloir, Donald Pilon, Yvon Dufour, Claude Michaud and Raymond Cloutier.

The film won three Canadian Film Awards at the 22nd Canadian Film Awards, for Best Supporting Actor (Gélinas), Best Supporting Actress (Giroux) and Best Cinematography (Bernard Chentrier).
