= Evolution (1971 film) =

1971 film by Michael Mills

- Directed by: Michael Mills
- Written by: Michael Mills
- Produced by: Michael Mills; Robert Verrall (exec.)
- Cinematography: Kjeld Nielsen (animation)
- Edited by: Peter Hearn (sound)
- Music by: Doug Randle
- Production company: National Film Board of Canada
- Distributed by: National Film Board of Canada
- Release date: 1971
- Running time: 10 minutes
- Country: Canada

Evolution (Évolution) is a 1971 animated short film created by Michael Mills for the National Film Board of Canada.

Evolution offers a humorous portrayal of evolution. In 10 minutes, it covers everything, from single-celled amoebae romping about the ocean depths, to the first amphibious creatures crawling onto land, to the forefathers of Homo sapiens.

Evolution won Best Animated Film at the 23rd Canadian Film Awards, the FIPRESCI Prize at the 1972 Kraków Film Festival, and was nominated for the Academy Award for Best Animated Short Film at the 44th Academy Awards.

== See also ==
- History of the World in Three Minutes Flat-the 1980 animated short also directed by Mills
- 1971 in film
