= The Drag (film) =

- Directed by: Carlos Marchiori
- Produced by: Wolf Koenig; Robert Verrall
- Narrated by: Guy Glover
- Cinematography: Murray Fallen
- Edited by: Karl Duplessis (sound)
- Music by: Donald Douglas
- Production company: National Film Board of Canada
- Distributed by: National Film Board of Canada
- Release date: 1965
- Running time: 8 minutes
- Country: Canada
- Language: English

The Drag is a 1965 anti-smoking animated short film, animated and directed by the Italian artist Carlos Marchiori for the National Film Board of Canada.

== Summary ==
The Drag, which was sponsored by the Canadian Department of National Health and Welfare, is aimed at young people and is a comical look at the dangers of tobacco addiction and the difficulties of quitting. It also explores the part that cigarette advertising played in getting people hooked. It traces the insecure protagonist's path to addiction after he discovers, as a teen-ager, that smoking can make him "cool". His addiction follows him into adulthood, until the scare of lung cancer forces him to face his demons. This funny yet cautionary tale is told by the protagonist as he sits on a psychiatrist's couch, his recollections amusingly illustrated in colourful vignettes of his past. Entertaining and visually rich, the film is a deterrent against smoking drawn in typical '60s modernist/pop-art style, complete with kaleidoscopic collage montages.

== Awards ==
- Calvin Workshop Awards, Kansas City, Missouri: Notable Film Award, 1966
- Columbus International Film & Animation Festival, Columbus, Ohio: Chris Certificate, 1967
- International Festival of Red Cross and Health Films, Varna, Bulgaria: Silver Medal, 1969
- 39th Academy Awards, Los Angeles: Nominee: Best Short Subject, Cartoons, 1967
