= Karel Franta =

Czech painter and illustrator

Karel Franta (1 May 1928 – 19 July 2017) was a Czech painter and illustrator.

== Life ==
Franta was born in Libčice nad Vltavou, and studied as a graphic designer in Prague. He collaborated with important designers for children, including Jiří Trnka and Helena Zmatlíková. Later he graduated from the Academy of Fine Arts at Miloslav Holý and Vladimír Sychra. After graduating, he was an illustrator for children's magazines, and also illustrated several children's books, including "The Lion Leopold" by Reiner Kunze. His interests included music: several of his illustrations deal with musical themes. He was awarded the United Nations UNICEF Grand Prix, and was enrolled in the International Children's Book Association. He organized numerous individual and collective exhibitions.

== Death ==
Franta died of a heart attack following a long illness, surrounded by family.
