= The Family That Dwelt Apart =

- Directed by: Yvon Malette
- Produced by: Wolf Koenig; Robert Verrall (exec.)
- Narrated by: E. B. White
- Cinematography: Richard Moras (animation); Simon Leblanc (animation); Pierre Provost
- Music by: Eldon Rathburn
- Production company: National Film Board of Canada
- Distributed by: National Film Board of Canada
- Release date: 1973
- Running time: 7 minutes
- Country: Canada
- Language: English

The Family That Dwelt Apart is a 1973 animated short film created by Yvon Malette for the National Film Board of Canada.

== Summary ==
Based on the 1937 short story "Preposterous Parables; III The Family Which Dwelt Apart" by E. B. White, the film is about what happens to a family of seven who live in happy isolation on a small island in Barnetuck Bay. When the bay freezes over and outsiders believe that the family must be in distress, an ill-conceived rescue attempt makes for unexpected adventures, and disaster.

== Awards ==
- Chicago International Film Festival: Silver Hugo, 1973
- 25th Canadian Film Awards, Montreal: Best Animated Film, 1973
- 47th Academy Awards: Nominee: Best Animated Short Film, 1975
