= History of the World in Three Minutes Flat =

- Directed by: Michael Mills
- Written by: Michael Mills
- Produced by: Michael Mills
- Narrated by: Vlasta Vrána
- Production company: Michael Mills Productions
- Release date: 1980
- Running time: 3 minutes
- Country: Canada
- Language: English

History of the World in Three Minutes Flat is a 1980 Canadian animated short film, directed by Michael Mills.

== Summary ==
The film depicts a history of life on Earth, beginning with God (who had been given seven days to create the world but wasted the first six) hurriedly putting together the planet. Scenes rapidly progress from Biblical times to the Romans, Egyptians, the Dark Ages, the World Wars and finally up to the current day, where a group of people are seen arguing. When God yawns, however, the people begin to dance the curry their creator's favour. But God is unimpressed, saying, "Oh, well. Better try again." (Despite the title, the film is actually three minutes and 24 seconds long.)

== Production ==
The short was animated by Bill Speers, John Gaug, Jim Hiltz, and Rick Bowan.

== Accolades ==
This hugely successful film won a multitude of international awards. The film received a Genie Award nomination for Best Theatrical Short Film at the 2nd Genie Awards in 1981, and an Academy Award nomination for Best Animated Short Film at the 53rd Academy Awards. It won the award for Best Film Under Three Minutes at the 1980 Ottawa International Animation Festival, the Short Film Golden Bear at the 1981 Berlin Film Festival, a Golden Reel Award from the Canada Council's inaugural Canadian Short Films Showcase, and the American Film and Video Festival's Blue Ribbon Award.

== See also ==
- 1980 in film
- Evolution-the 1971 animated short also directed by Mills

== Works cited ==
- Mazurkewich, Karen (1999). Cartoon Capers: The History of Canadian Animators. McArthur & Company Publishing. ISBN 1-55278-093-7.
