= Bernard Chentrier =

Canadian cinematographer

Bernard Chentrier was a Canadian film and television cinematographer. He was most noted for his work on the film Red, for which he won the Canadian Film Award for Best Cinematography at the 22nd Canadian Film Awards in 1970.

His other credits included the films The Rape of a Sweet Young Girl (Le viol d'une jeune fille douce), Don't Push It (Pousse mais pousse égal), Enuff Is Enuff (J'ai mon voyage!) and Mindfield (La mémoire assassinée), and the television series He Shoots, He Scores (Lance et compte) and Le Sorcier.
