= Libčice nad Vltavou =

- Town
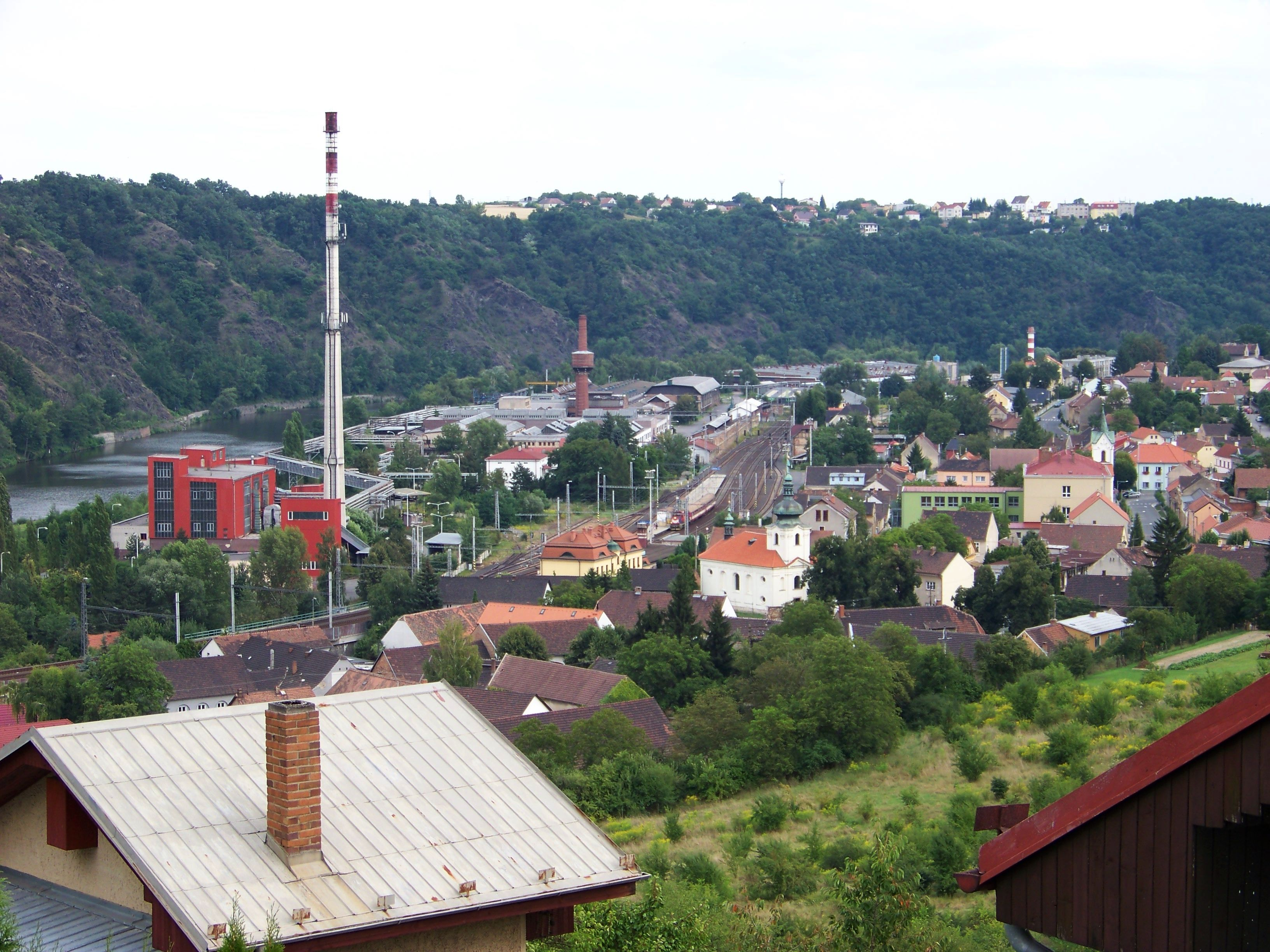
- View from the north

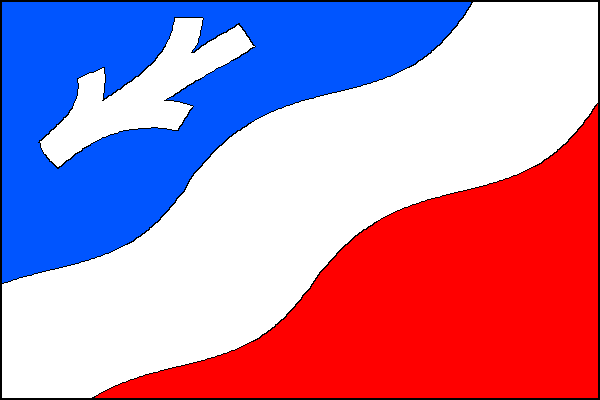
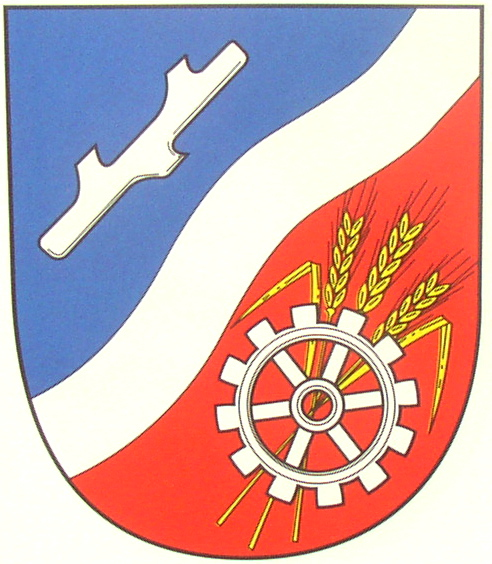
- Flag Coat of arms

- Location in the Czech Republic
- Coordinates: 50°11′57″N 14°21′46″E
- Country: Czech Republic
- Region: Central Bohemian
- District: Prague-West
- First mentioned: 993

Government
  - Mayor: Petra Pelešková

Area
  - Total: 7.10 km^{2} (2.74 sq mi)
- Elevation: 207 m (679 ft)

Population (2026-01-01)
  - Total: 3,575
  - Density: 504/km^{2} (1,300/sq mi)
- Time zone: UTC+1 (CET)
  - Summer (DST): UTC+2 (CEST)
- Postal code: 252 66
- Website: www.libcice.cz

Libčice nad Vltavou (Czech pronunciation: [ˈlɪbtʃɪtsɛ ˈnad vl̩tavou]; German: Libschitz an der Moldau) is a town in Prague-West District in the Central Bohemian Region of the Czech Republic. It has about 3,600 inhabitants. The town is located on the Vltava River in the Prague Plateau.

== Etymology ==
The name Libčice is derived from the old personal Slavic name Lubek (Ľúbek, Líbek), meaning "the village of Lubek's people". The personal name itself was derived from the adjective ľúbý, libý, meaning 'nice' or 'pleasant' in Old Czech. The suffix nad Vltavou ('upon the Vltava') refers to its location near this river. The name first appeared as Lubcice in a Latin text.

== Geography ==
Libčice nad Vltavou is located about 9 kilometres (6 mi) north of Prague. It lies in the Prague Plateau. The highest point is at 313 m (1,027 ft) above sea level. The town is situated on the left bank of the Vltava River, in a meander of this river.

== History ==
The first written mention of Libčice (initially called Libšice) is in a foundation deed of the Břevnov Monastery from 993, when Duke Boleslaus II donated the village to the monastery. In 1850, the railway was built and the village became subsequently industrialised.

The name Libšice was used until 1924. In that year, the neighbouring municipalities of Libšice, Letky and Chejnov were merged into one municipality and under the name Libčice nad Vltavou promoted to a market town. In 1948, it was promoted to a town.

== Demographics ==
Historical population

Year	Pop.	±%
1869	556	—
1880	1,211	+117.8%
1890	1,424	+17.6%
1900	2,160	+51.7%
1910	2,396	+10.9%

Year	Pop.	±%
1921	2,318	−3.3%
1930	2,992	+29.1%
1950	3,162	+5.7%
1961	3,434	+8.6%
1970	3,267	−4.9%

Year	Pop.	±%
1980	3,079	−5.8%
1991	2,999	−2.6%
2001	3,302	+10.1%
2011	3,255	−1.4%
2021	3,526	+8.3%

Source: Censuses

== Transport ==
Libčice nad Vltavou is located on the railway line Prague–Ústí nad Labem via Kralupy nad Vltavou.

== Sights ==
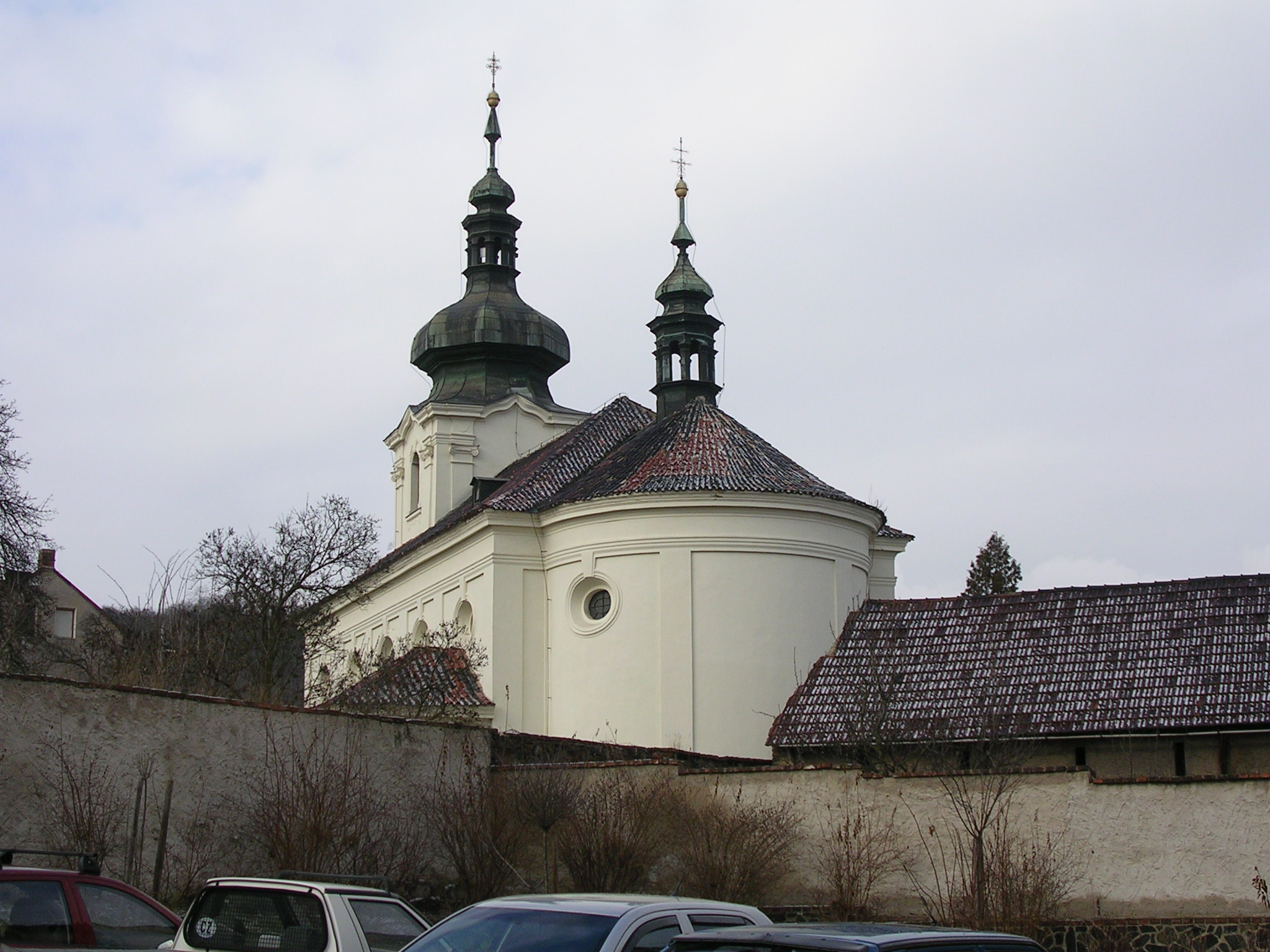
Church of Saint Bartholomew

The most important monument is the Church of Saint Bartholomew. It was a Gothic church from the 14th century, completely rebuilt in the Baroque style in 1763–1769.

The Evangelical church was built in the Neo-Romanesque style in 1863–1865.

== Notable people ==
- Miroslav Štěpánek (1923–2005), artist, animator and film director
- Karel Franta (1928–2017), painter and illustrator
- Günter Bittengel (born 1966), football player and coach; lives here

== Twin towns – sister cities ==
Libčice nad Vltavou is twinned with:

- Moresco, Italy
