= The House That Jack Built (1967 film) =

- Directed by: Ron Tunis
- Written by: Don Arioli
- Produced by: Wolf Koenig; Jim Mackay
- Starring: Don Arioli; Les Nirenberg; Ben Lennick
- Music by: Donald Douglas
- Production company: National Film Board of Canada
- Release date: 1967
- Running time: 8 minutes
- Country: Canada
- Language: English

The House That Jack Built is a 1967 National Film Board of Canada animated short based on the nursery rhyme "This Is the House That Jack Built". Directed by Ron Tunis, written by Don Arioli and produced by Wolf Koenig, the eight-minute film was nominated for an Academy Award for Best Animated Short Film, losing to Winnie the Pooh and the Blustery Day at the 41st Academy Awards. Jack is desperate to escape his nine-to-five life. Mirroring the fairy tale, he trades his car for a handful of beans.
