= Wild Africa (film) =

1970 film by John Livingston and William Bantings

- Genre: Documentary
- Written by: John Livingston; William Whitehead
- Directed by: John Livingston; William Banting
- Country of origin: Canada
- Original language: English

Production
- Producers: John Livingston; William Banting
- Cinematography: Rolph Blackstad; Roger Tory Peterson
- Running time: 120 minutes

Original release
- Network: CBC Television
- Release: February 25 – March 25, 1970

Wild Africa is a Canadian documentary film, directed by John Livingston and William Banting and released in 1970. A nature documentary, the film depicts the wildlife of Africa and efforts to protect it through the creation and maintenance of game reserves.

The film was broadcast in 1970 as two separate episodes of the CBC Television documentary series The Nature of Things, "Wild Africa: As It Was" on February 25 and "Wild Africa: Something New" on March 25. The two episodes were subsequently rebroadcast by the CBC in 1971, and were purchased for international broadcast by Nederlandse Omroep Stichting and the Australian Broadcasting Corporation. It was rebroadcast in the United States in 1984 after some PBS stations picked up The Nature of Things, with the result that some film directories have mistakenly labelled it as a 1984 film.

The film won the Canadian Film Award for Best Theatrical Documentary at the 22nd Canadian Film Awards.
