= Fernande Giroux =

Canadian actress and jazz singer

Fernande Giroux (died May 20, 1994) was a Canadian actress and jazz singer. She was most noted for winning the Canadian Film Award for Best Supporting Actress at the 22nd Canadian Film Awards for her performance in the film Red. Her other major acting roles were as Monique Wingate in the television series Moment of Truth, and Madame Gagnon in the television miniseries The Newcomers.

As a singer, she was known primarily for cabaret performances in the Montreal area, and appearances on Quebec television variety shows.
