= Hey Mister, Let's Play! =

Animated Czech TV series

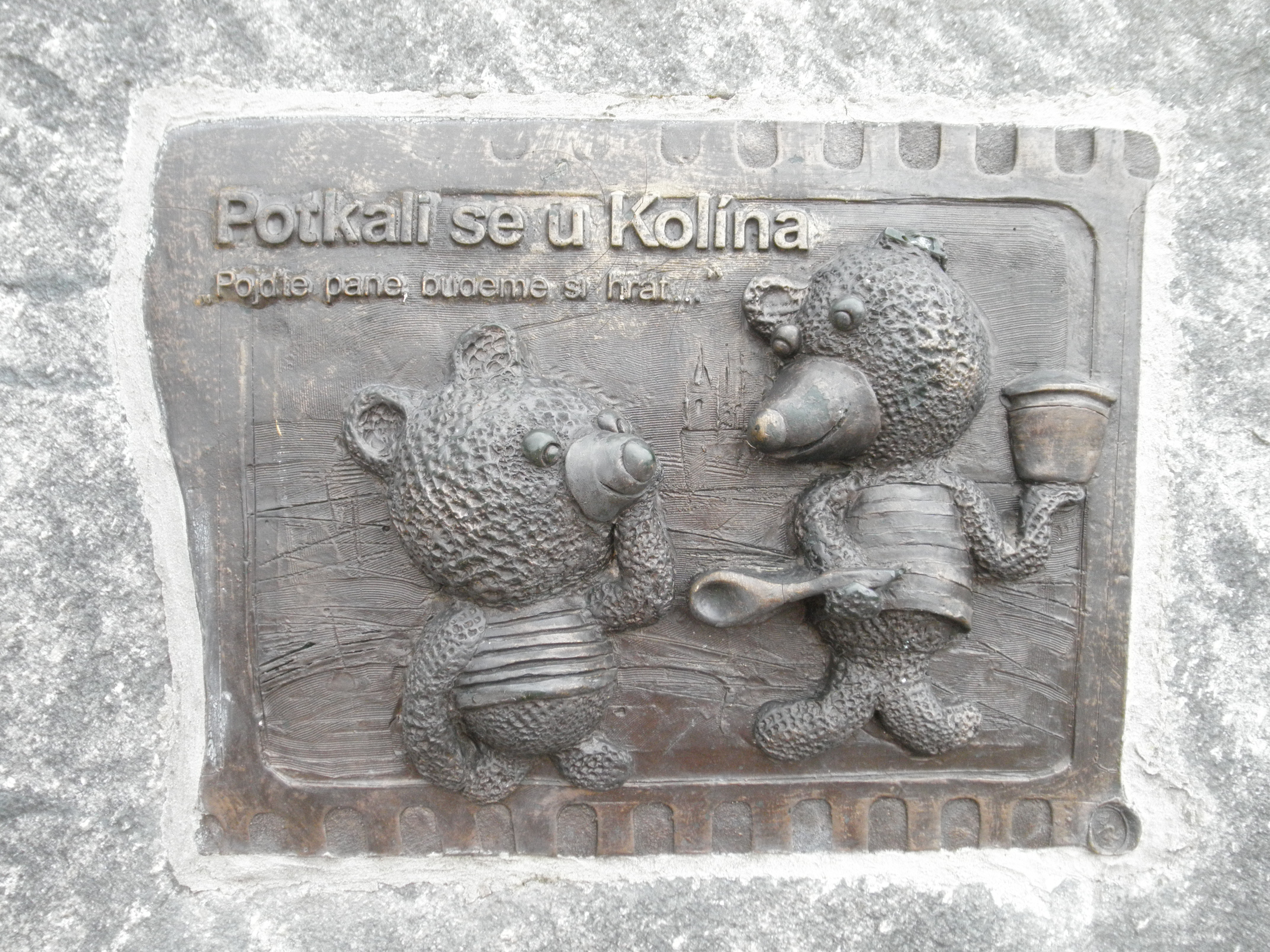
Memorial plaque of the memorial to bears from Kolín

Hey Mister, Let's Play! (Czech: Pojďte pane, budeme si hrát) is a Czech animated television series, created by Břetislav Pojar, Miroslav Štěpánek and Ivan Urban. It used mostly stop motion animation to tell the story of two teddy bears. It is based on a short film How They Met At Kolin (Potkali se u Kolína, 1965). It was filmed between 1965 and 1973. The second season on the other hand is named Kdo to hodil, pánové (Who threw that, Gentlemen).

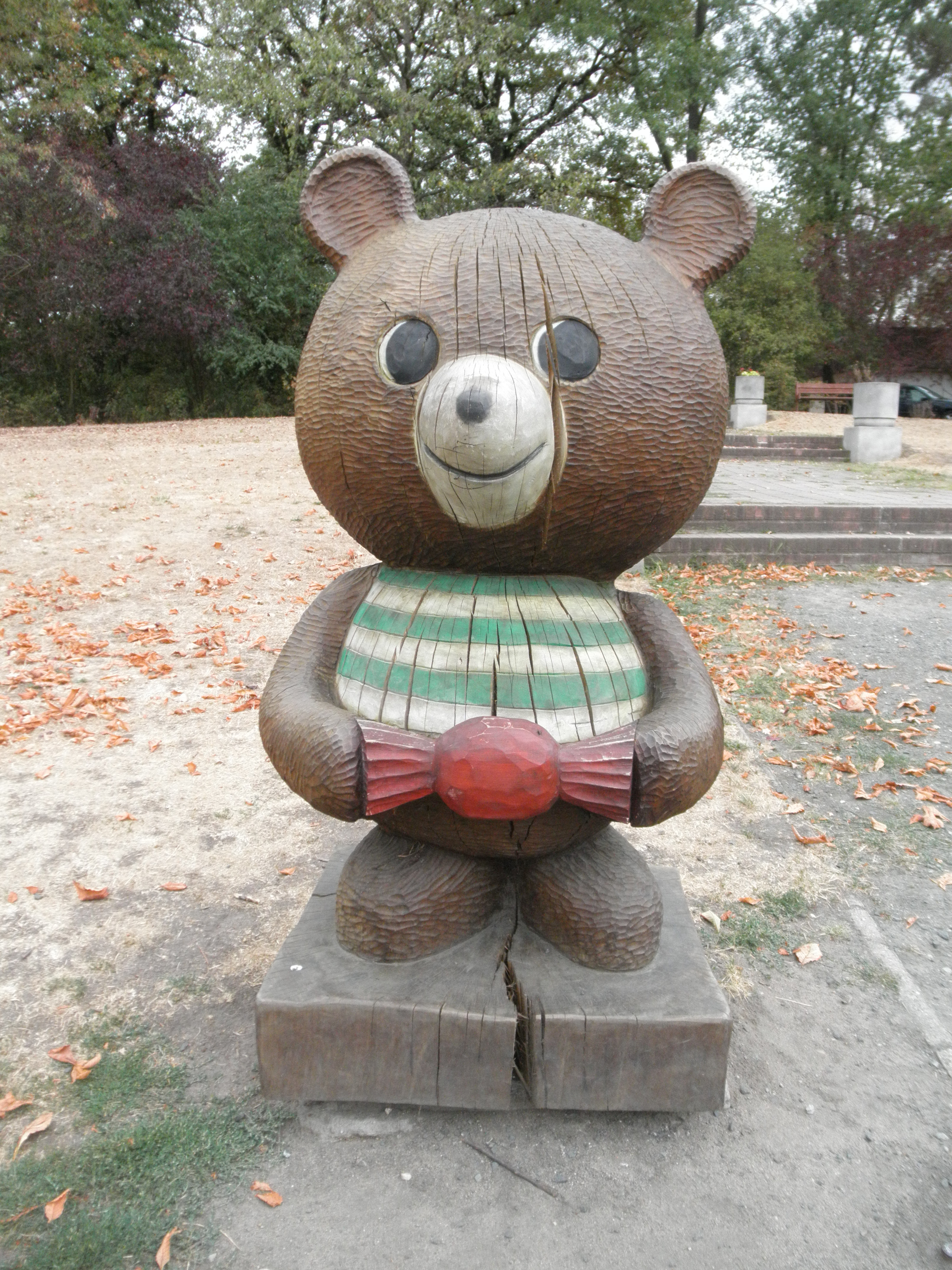
Wooden statue of smaller bear from the TV series.

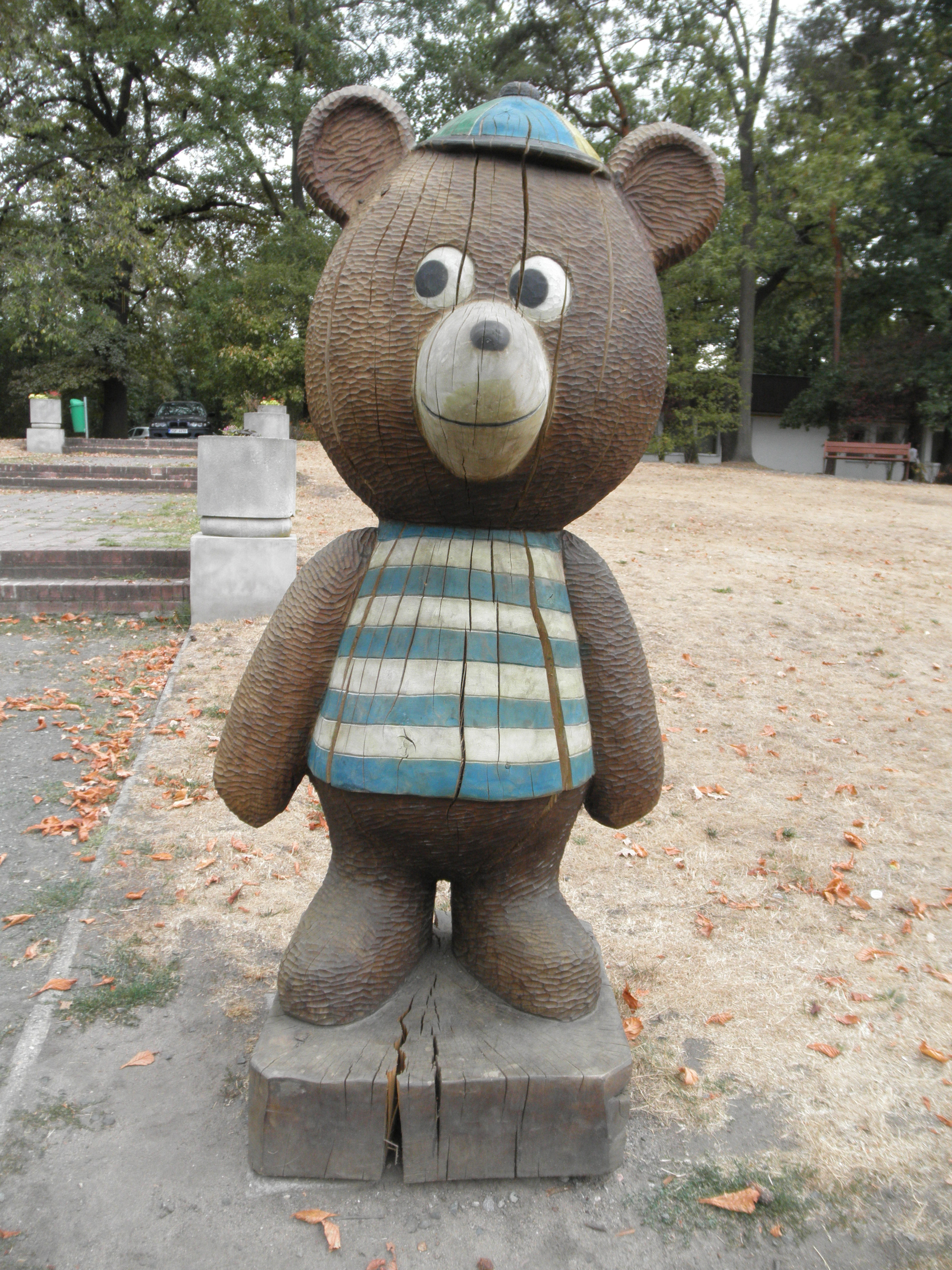
Wooden statue of taller bear from the TV series.
