= Balablok =

- Directed by: Břetislav Pojar
- Produced by: René Jodoin
- Music by: Maurice Blackburn
- Production company: National Film Board of Canada
- Release date: 1972
- Running time: 7 minutes
- Country: Canada

Balablok is a 1972 animated short written and directed by Břetislav Pojar exploring the human propensity for resorting to violence over reason.

== Accolades ==
The 7 min 27 sec film received the 1973 Grand Prix du Festival for Short Film at the Cannes Film Festival.

== Production ==
Produced by René Jodoin for the National Film Board of Canada, with music by Maurice Blackburn, the film was produced at a cost of C$37,000, utilizing cutout animation.
