= Michael Mills (Canadian producer) =

British-Canada producer and director

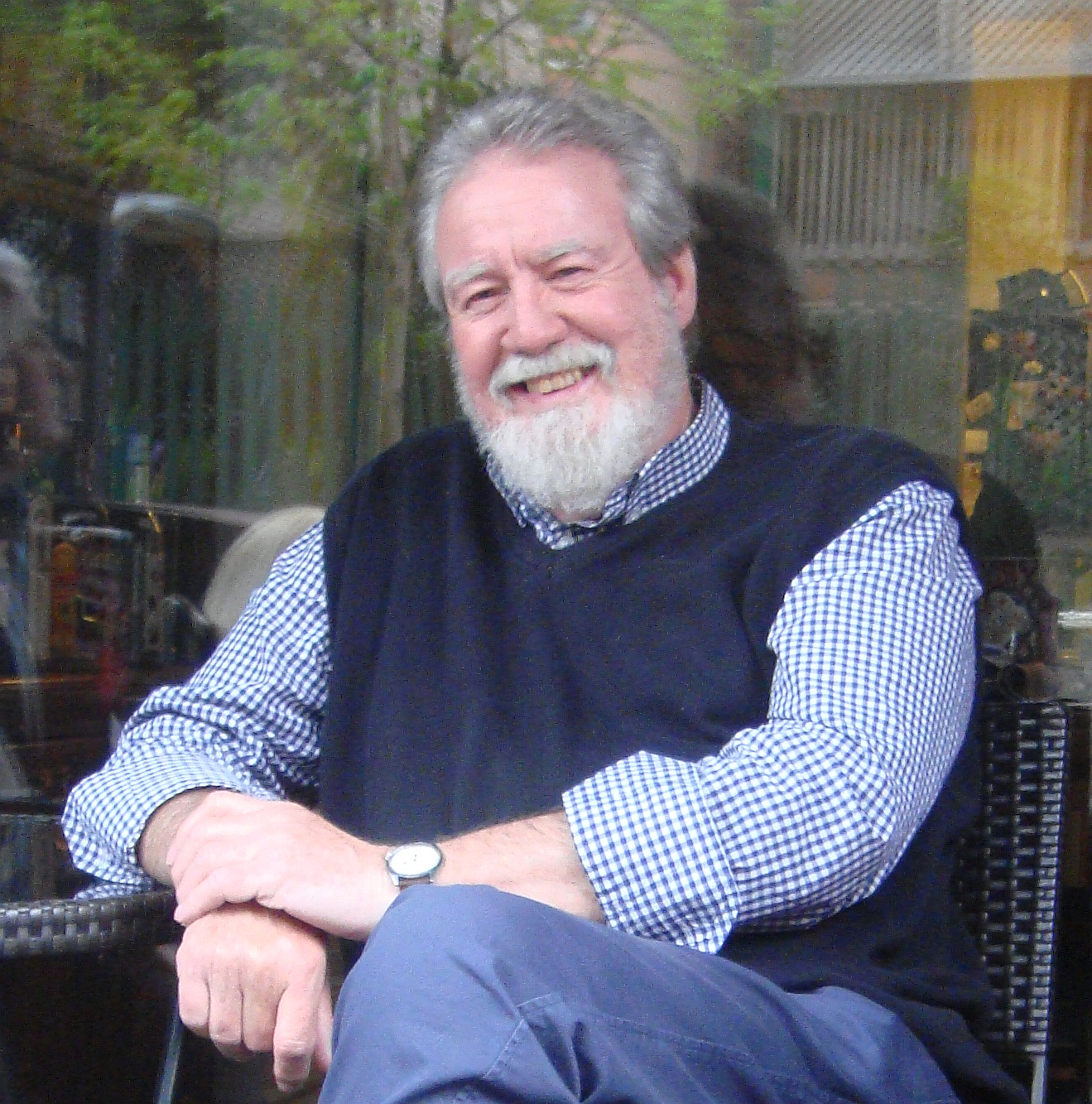
- Born: January 14, 1942 (age 84); London
- Occupations: Producer and director
- Years active: 1966-1980

Michael Mills (born January 14, 1942) is a British-born Canadian producer and director of short films. He has received two Oscar nominations. He also made the Canadian Anthem Animation for Television stations, still being used by CBC Television and Ici Radio-Canada Télé.

== Oscar nominations ==
Both of the following films were in the category of Academy Award for Best Animated Short Film:

- 44th Academy Awards-Nominated for Evolution. Lost to The Crunch Bird.
- 53rd Academy Awards-Nominated for History of the World in Three Minutes Flat. Lost to The Fly.
