= John Livingston (naturalist) =

Canadian naturalist, 1923–2006

John Allen Livingston (November 10, 1923 – January 17, 2006) was a Canadian naturalist, broadcaster, author, and teacher. He was most known as the voice-over of the Hinterland Who's Who series of television zoological shorts in the 1960s.

He was born in Hamilton, Ontario, the son of Harold Arthur Livingston, who was in the construction business, and Vera Allen Livingston. He enlisted in the Royal Canadian Navy at the beginning of World War II and earned a degree in English literature in 1943 while on active service. After the war, he worked at the accounting firm of Clarkson Gordon from 1946 to 1949 while engaging in free-lance writing and speaking on environmental issues. He married Constance Margaret ("Peggy") Ellis in 1948, and they had three children: Sally, Zeke and Least.

He joined the Audubon Society of Canada in 1955 as managing director and editor of its newsletter. He later became head of the science unit at the Canadian Broadcasting Corporation (CBC), most notably serving as the first executive producer of the long-running documentary series The Nature of Things. He left the CBC in 1968, but remained a regular contributor of documentary films to The Nature of Things, most notably the Canadian Film Award-winning Wild Africa in 1970. He then formed LGL Limited: environmental research associates, an environmental consulting company, with Aird Lewis and Bill Gunn of the Nature Conservancy of Canada; the firm became most noted for their work on the Mackenzie Valley Pipeline Inquiry.

Livingston helped found York University's Faculty of Environmental Studies (FES) in 1971 and taught there until he retired in 1993, becoming a professor emeritus.

In1985 he married his second wife, Ursula Moller Jolin, a former graduate student.

Livingston was the author of several books, including The Fallacy of Wildlife Conservation (1981) and the Governor General's Award-winning Rogue Primate (1994).

== Selected bibliography ==
- Darwin and the Galapagos (1966) (with Lister Sinclair)
- Birds of the Northern Forest (1966) (with J. F. Lansdowne)
- One Cosmic Instant (1968)
- Arctic Oil (1981)
- The Fallacy of Wildlife Conservation (1981)
- Canada: A Natural History (1988)
- Rogue Primate: An Exploration of Human Domestication (1994)
