= Kaj Pindal =

Danish-Canadian animator (1927–2019)

- Born: Kaj Gøtzsche Pindal; December 1, 1927; Copenhagen, Denmark
- Died: June 28, 2019 (aged 91); Toronto, Canada
- Occupations: Animator, teacher
- Years active: 1940s-2019
- Known for: Peep and the Big Wide World, What on Earth!

Kaj Gøtzsche Pindal (December 1, 1927 – June 28, 2019) was a Danish-Canadian animator and animation educator who worked at the National Film Board of Canada (NFB) beginning in 1957, and created such works as the Academy Award-nominated What on Earth! (1967, co-directed with Les Drew) and the 1988 NFB short Peep and the Big Wide World as well as the television series of the same name in 2004.

== Biography ==
Pindal began his career as an underground cartoonist during the German occupation of Denmark, and was forced to flee his home city of Copenhagen when his series of anti-Hitler cartoons put his life in peril. After the Second World War, he made animated commercials in Sweden and at Denmark's Nordisk Film, and worked on UNESCO films and filmstrips. He immigrated to Canada in 1957 and joined the NFB the same year.

In 1962, he created the NFB short The Peep Show, which eventually spun-off to the short Peep and the Big Wide World in 1988 and became a television series of the same name in 2004. The series won a Daytime Emmy for Outstanding Children's Animation Program in 2005. His other NFB credits also include The City: Osaka, created for Expo '70 in Osaka, and designed to give Japanese people a glimpse into Canadian life. This two-minute black-and-white film played during the world's fair on a screen composed of sixty thousand individual light bulbs. Pindal is the subject of a 1979 NFB documentary entitled Laugh Lines.

In addition to his work at the NFB, Pindal returned to Denmark for a year in 1970 and spent several months in 1983 teaching in Denmark and Sweden. He remained an influence in Canadian animation through his involvement with Sheridan College, where he had taught from 1977 to 2019. He often stated, "Life is too short for long films."

Pindal died on June 28, 2019, at the age of 91.
