= Propaganda Message =

- French: Message de propagande
- Directed by: Barrie Nelson
- Screenplay by: Don Arioli; Les Nirenberg
- Produced by: Wolf Koenig; Roman Kroitor
- Music by: Micky Erbe; Maribeth Solomon
- Animation by: Barrie Nelson
- Production company: National Film Board of Canada
- Release date: 1971
- Running time: 14 minutes
- Country: Canada
- Languages: English, French

Propaganda Message is a Canadian animated short film, directed by Barrie Nelson and released in 1971. A satire of Canadian society, the film mocks the social and cultural prejudices that Canadians often hold of each other, including linguistic, political, ethnic and economic cleavages, presenting a plea for greater tolerance and understanding of people's differences.

The film was written by Don Arioli, who won the Canadian Film Award for Best Screenplay (Non-Feature) at the 23rd Canadian Film Awards in 1971 for both Propaganda Message and Hot Stuff.

The film won a gold award at the first USA International Animation Film Festival in New York City in 1972.
