= Miroslav Štěpánek (artist) =

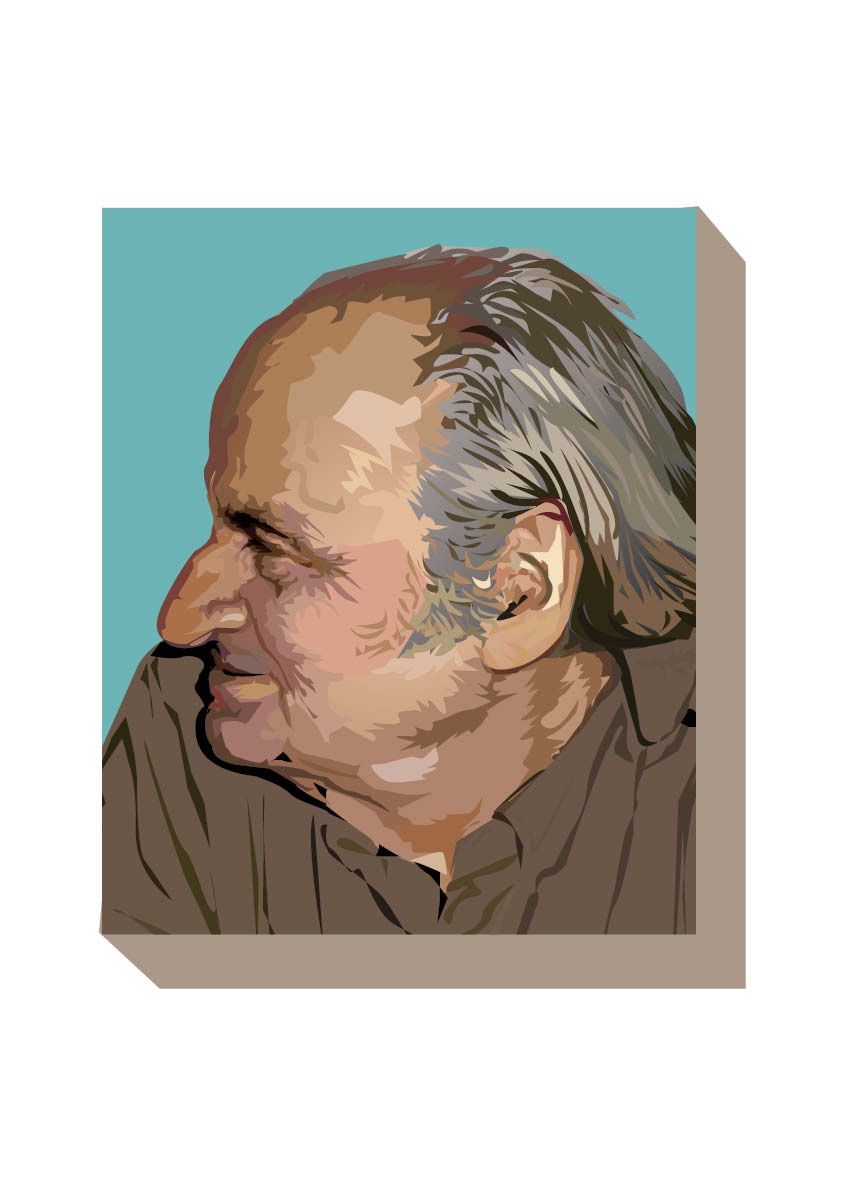
- Štěpánek
- Born: 2 December 1923; Libčice nad Vltavou
- Died: 28 November 2005 (aged 81); Prague
- Education: Theatre Faculty of the Academy of Performing Arts in Prague

Miroslav Štěpánek (2 December 1923 – 28 November 2005) was a Czech artist, director, screenwriter, set designer, illustrator, graphic designer, animator, and sculptor. He was known for his contributions to Czech animated film and Czech, British and Japanese puppet film, cartoon animation and theatre during the 20th century.

== Early life and education ==
Štěpánek was born in Libčice nad Vltavou. He graduated at the Grammar school of Antonín Dvořák in Kralupy nad Vltavou.

In 1950 he graduated from DAMU, department of theatre design in Prague. He studied also under the painter and graphic artist František Tichý. He studied at the Philosophical Faculty of Charles University in Prague, department of Art History, but did not graduate.

== Career ==
Štěpánek worked for the Prague theatres, drawing and creating puppet animations in the 1950s. In 1962 he created a puppet animation for the short film Small but Mine ( Malé ale moje), and special effects with stretchable puppets for the film 40 Granddads (Čtyřicet dědečků)

Throughout the 1970s Štěpánek worked at Krátký Film Praha studio, creating many film projects with Břetislav Pojar and Jiří Šalamoun. His contribution to these films was uncredited until 2002, when he won the Andrej Stankovič Prize for best Czech film annual achievement for this work.

One of the better known works from this time is an animated series about two bears, Hey Mister, Let's Play!, for which Štěpánek was the primary creative artist, working with animator Boris Masník. His colleague Břetislav Pojar directed the first three episodes; later episodes were directed by Štěpánek with long distance telephone collaboration from Canada by Pojar, who returned in time to direct the final two episodes. Other projects in which he was involved are the politically charged What the Warm Didn't Know (Co žížala nevěděla) and Appletree Virgin (Jabloňová panna).

Štěpánek maintained a workshop under the Týn in Prague, while commuting to his work at the studio Bratři v triku for many years. He was the author and director of the short film The Shooting Gallery (C.K. Střelnice) in 1969, for the studio Krátký Film among others, it was awarded the Chicago Silver Hugo and was sold for American university distribution.

Štěpánek's meticulous working style at times slowed down production at the studio. In the mid-1970s, work on the serialized adaptation of Jiří Trnka's book The Garden (Zahrada), again with Pojar's direction and Štěpánek's puppets and art, stalled because of the complex set and technical equipment, and only five episodes were filmed, although the authors had contracts for additional episodes. Pojar and Štěpánek worked together on a film production of The Garden, which was left unfinished after changes were made by the studio administration. Between 1977 and 1979 the three made films about Dášeňka for the children's program Večerníček, on Czechoslovak Television.

After this Štěpánek ended his work with Pojar, partly over disagreement about the credits for the series Hey Mister, Let's Play!.

Štěpánek made animated films with other directors, including Václav Bedřich and Jiří Brdečka. The Czech art historian Jiří Šetlik in a review of Brdečka's film Revange (Pomsta, 1968) praised Štěpánek's art direction as well as the story, camerawork and editing.

With cartoonist Václav Bedřich, Štěpánek created an adaptation of the feature parodies made by director Oldřich Lipský. These included three films about the fate of Kamenáč Bill and the series Deadly Scent (Smrticí vůně) by Bedřich.

The Italian production company Corona Cinematografica Roma in collaboration with Krátký Film in 1973 co-produced a Czech folk fairy-tale. Štěpánek chose Erben's Jabloňová panna and in the workshops of the Krátký studio created Trnka-esque gothic-style puppets and scenery, to illustrate the climate of Czechoslovakia under the occupying forces.

Štěpánek worked for two years at the studio Krátký Film on the film project The Pied Piper, with more than sixty puppets, and many backgrounds. Although the German co-producer of the project TV 2000 Film- und Fernsehproduktions contracted for Štěpánek's work, the post-1968 management of the studio did not allow him to complete this project; the film was completed using other puppets by Jiří Barta and Milada Kučerová.

Štěpánek subsequently mounted a few smaller exhibits, including one at the Mladá Fronta Gallery in 1985 and at the Castle in Roztoky u Prahy in 1988.

During the first half of the 1990s Štěpánek entered into a legal battle with Krátký Film concerning the films made jointly by Štěpánek and Pojar; among other things he requested a correction of the credit titles in the filmed copies of the serial about bears; in the original television cycle and in the later serial of the same name directed by Jana Hádková, Štěpánek's name was rarely mentioned. Subsequently, a version of Hey Mister, Let's Play! giving Štěpánek credit as creative artist and director was circulated in both Czech cinema and television channels. Eventually, after intervention by the organization for the protection of authors, the masters of the serial Pojďte pane budeme si hrát TV tapes were corrected.

In June 2005 Štěpánek received the "Andrej "Nikolaj" Stankovič Prize". for cinematography for his lifelong work and contribution to the Czech film industry. In 2005 the Summer Film School at Uherské Hradiště, Czech Republic, presented retrospectives showing films by Pojar and Štěpánek, and printed supplementary information about both authors in its catalogue.

== Death ==
Štěpánek died on 28 November 2005, in Prague. His films are still being shown both at festivals and in cinemas. Film historian Zdena Škapová wrote, "In the sixties two names in Czech animated film are above all others – Miroslav Štěpánek and Jan Švankmajer."

== Filmography ==
=== As director ===
- 1973 – Nazdar, kedlubny (from the series Pojďte pane, budeme si hrát)
- 1972 – A neříkej mi Vašíku (from the series Pojďte pane, budeme si hrát)
- 1971 – Psí kusy (from the series Pojďte pane, budeme si hrát)
- 1970 – Co to bouchlo (from the series Pojďte pane, budeme si hrát), O pardálu, který voněl (from the series Pojďte pane, budeme si hrát)
- 1969 – Co žížala netušila
- 1968 – C. K. Střelnice
- 1967 – Jak šli spát (from the series Pojďte pane, budeme si hrát)
- 1966 – Držte si klobouk (from the series Pojďte pane, budeme si hrát), Jak jedli vtipnou kaši (from the series Pojďte pane, budeme si hrát)
- 1965 – "Potkali se u Kolína, Jak jeli k vodě, K princeznám se nečuchá" (from the series Pojďte pane, budeme si hrát)

=== As designer ===
- 1983 – Black and White, KF
- 1981 – Pohádka o Kubovi Kostečkovi, o počmáraném pejskovi
- 1980 – Die Zauberlanterne (Kouzelná lampa), DEFA
- 1979 – Dášeňka – Jak se narodila, ČT
- 1979 – Dášeňka – Jak uviděla svět, ČT
- 1979 – Dášeňka – Jak rostla, ČT
- 1979 – Dášeňka – Co měla na práci, ČT
- 1979 – Dášeňka – Mnoho vody uteklo, ČT
- 1979 – Dášeňka – Jak sportovala, ČT
- 1979 – Dášeňka – Jak šla do služby, ČT
- 1977 – Velryba Abyrlev, Krátký Film
- 1977 – O myších ve staniolu, Krátký Film
- 1976 – Jak ulovit tygra, Krátký Film
- 1975 – O té velké mlze, Krátký Film
- 1974 – Milovník zvířat, Krátký Film
- 1973 – Nazdar, kedlubny, Krátký Film
- 1973 – Jabloňová panna, Krátký Film
- 1972 – Kamenáč Bill a jeho přepevné laso, Krátký Film
- 1972 – A neříkej mi Vašíku, Krátký Film
- 1971 – Psí kusi, Krátký Film
- 1971 – O pardálu, který voněl, Krátký Film
- 1971 – Kamenáč Bill a ohromní moskyti, Krátký Film
- 1970 – Co to bouchlo?, Krátký Film
- 1969 – Co žížala netušila, Krátký Film
- 1969 – C.K. Střelnice, Krátký Film
- 1968 – Pomsta, 1968, Krátký Film
- 1968 – Moc osudu, Krátký Film
- 1968 – Město smutku, Krátký Film
- 1967 – Meč, Krátký Film
- 1967 – Jak šli spát, Krátký Film
- 1966 – Jak jedli vtipnou kaši, Krátký Film
- 1966 – Držte se kloubouk, Krátký Film
- 1965 – K princeznám se nečuchá, Krátký Film
- 1965 – Jak jeli k vodě, Krátký Film
- 1965 – Potkali se u Kolina, Krátký Film
- 1964 – Proměna, Krátký Film
- 1964 – Kamenáč Bill a drzí zajíci, Krátký Film
- 1963 – Solidní dědeček, Krátký Film
- 1962 – Malé, ale moje!, Krátký Film
- 1962 – Čtyřicet dědečků, Krátký Film
- 1961 – Kočičí škola, Krátký Film
- 1960 – Malování pro kočku, Krátký Film
- 1960 – Kočičí slovo, Krátký Film
- 1958 – Modrý pondělek, Krátký Film

== Awards (selected) ==
- 1961 Main Prize – St. Mark's Lion IFF Venezia Kočičí škola (Kratký Film Praha, 1961)
- 1966 Golden Pelican – IFF Mamaia K princeznám se nečuchá (Kratký Film Praha, 1965)
- 1967 Golden Pelican – IFF Tehran Držte si klobouk (Kratký Film Praha, 1966)
- 1967 Special Jury Prize – IFF Tehran Držte si klobouk (Kratký Film Praha, 1966)
- 1967 ČSM Prize Držte si klobouk (Kratký Film Praha, 1966)
- 1966 Main Prize and Czech Film Industry Prize – DKF Karlovy Vary Potkali se u Kolína, Jak jeli k vodě, K princeznám se nečuchá (Kratký Film Praha, 1965)
- 1967 Trilobit – FITES K princeznám se nečuchá (Kratký Film Praha, 1965)
- 1969 Main Prize – ARSfilm Kroměříž Pomsta (Kratký Film Praha, 1967/68)
- 1969 Special Jury Prize – ARSfilm Kroměříž C.K. Střelnice (Kratký Film Praha, 1969)
- 1970 Main Prize – FČSF Piešťany C.K. Střelnice (Kratký Film Praha, 1969)
- 1970 Silver HUGO – IFF Chicago C.K. Střelnice (Kratký Film Praha, 1969)
- 1970 Special Jury Prize – IFF Columbus C.K. Střelnice (Kratký Film Praha, 1969)
- 1970 Red Ribbon – IFF New York C.K. Střelnice (Kratký Film Praha, 1969)
- 1970 Special Prize – IFF San Francisco C.K. Střelnice (Kratký Film Praha, 1969)
- 1971 Silver Tolar – ARSfilm Kroměříž Psí kusy (Kratký Film Praha, 1971)
- 1972 Jiří Trnka Prize – IFF Gottwaldov Psí kusy (Kratký Film Praha, 1971)
- 1971 Silver Shoe – IFF Gottwaldov Kamenáč Bill a ohromní moskyti (Kratký Film Praha, 1971)
- 1973 Golden South Cross – IFF Adelaide Kamenáč Bill a ohromní moskyti (Kratký Film Praha, 1971)
- 1979 Main Golden Prize – IFF Odense Jabloňová panna (Kratký Film Praha, 1973)
- 1974 Jiří Trnka Prize – IFF Gottwaldov Jabloňová panna (Kratký Film Praha, 1973)
- 1974 Silver Tolar – ARSfilm Kroměříž for the film Jabloňová panna (Kratký Film Praha, 1973)
- 1975 Special Jury Prize – IFF Gottwaldov for the film Milovník zvířat (Kratký Film Praha, 1974)
- 1975 Silver Tolar – ARSfillm Kroměříž for the film Milovník zvířat (Kratký Film Praha, 1974)
- 1977 Special Jury Prize – IFF Gottwaldov for the film Jak ulovit tygra (Kratký Film Praha, 1976)
- 1978 Jiří Trnka Award – IFF Gottwaldov for the film O myších ve staniolu (Kratký Film Praha, 1977)
- 1978 Jiří Trnka Award – IFF Gottwaldov for the film Velryba Abyrlev (Kratký Film Praha, 1977)
