= Don Arioli =

- Born: September 2, 1936; Rochester, New York, U.S.
- Died: October 4, 2005 (aged 69); Devon, England
- Occupations: Actor, writer, director

Don Arioli (September 2, 1936 – October 4, 2005) was an American-Canadian actor and writer, noted for his work in children's television.

== Early life ==
Born in Rochester, New York, Arioli served in the United States Marine Corps in early adulthood, drawing a comic strip for the newsletter of the base where he was stationed, before moving to Toronto, Ontario in 1960. He worked as an actor and comedian with the Toronto Workshop Theatre, and was an illustrator for the underground newspaper The Panic Button, until joining the National Film Board of Canada in 1966. During his stint as an actor, he had guest appearances on The Forest Rangers and Wayne and Shuster.

== Filmmaking career ==
The first film he wrote for the NFB, The House That Jack Built, was nominated for the Academy Award for Best Animated Short Film at the 41st Academy Awards. He was also noted for the films Propaganda Message and Hot Stuff, for which he won the Canadian Film Award for Best Screenplay (Non-Feature) at the 23rd Canadian Film Awards in 1971. With the NFB he worked principally as a writer and as a voice actor, but also had a number of credits as an animator, including on both entertainment and educational films.

Over the course of his career, he also produced over 200 segments for both the American and Canadian editions of Sesame Street, occasionally appearing in the Canadian edition as a voice performer. He also collaborated with Chuck Jones on several Warner Bros. shorts in the 1990s, and wrote for various animated children's series.

In 1993, he directed the animated feature film David Copperfield.

At the 9th Gemini Awards in 1995, he received a nomination for Best Writing in a Children's or Youth Program or Series for his work on The Busy World of Richard Scarry.

== Personal life ==
He was married twice, first to Sandra Beattie and later to NFB colleague Rosemarie Shapley. From his first marriage to Beattie, he was the father of jazz singer Susie Arioli.

In the late 1990s, Arioli and Shapley moved to Devon, England, where Arioli continued to do animation work for the BBC. He died of prostate cancer in Devon on October 4, 2005.
