= To See or Not to See =

- Directed by: Břetislav Pojar
- Written by: Břetislav Pojar
- Produced by: Robert Verrall; Wolf Koenig
- Starring: Severn Darden (voice)
- Edited by: Maurice Blackburn (sound and music); Břetislav Pojar (sound and music)
- Music by: Genevieve Martin
- Production company: National Film Board of Canada
- Release date: 1969
- Running time: 14 min, 31 seconds
- Country: Canada
- Languages: English, French

To See or Not to See (French: Psychocratie) is a 1969 Canadian animated short film, directed by Břetislav Pojar for the National Film Board of Canada.

An exploration of fear, the film centres on a scientist who develops a pair of glasses that allows the wearer to see reality instead of subjective perception, thus making fear less onerous and easier to overcome.

== Awards ==
- Berlin International Film Festival, Berlin: Golden Bear for Best Short Film, 1969
- Chicago International Film Festival, Chicago: Certificate of Merit, 1969
- International Cinematography Congress, Colour Film Week, Barcelona: Diploma of Honour, 1969
- 22nd Canadian Film Awards, Toronto: Film of the Year, 1970
- 22nd Canadian Film Awards, Toronto: Best Animated Film, 1970
- International Film Festival in Guadalajara, Guadalajara: Award for Animation, 1971
- American Film and Video Festival, New York: Blue Ribbon, 1971
- SODRE International Festival of Documentary and Experimental Films, Montevideo: First Prize, Experimental, 1971
