= Barrie Nelson =

Canadian animator (1933–2021)

- Born: May 7, 1933; Winnipeg, Manitoba, Canada
- Died: September 29, 2021 (aged 88); Haiku, Hawaii, U.S.
- Education: University of Manitoba
- Occupation: Animator

Barrie Nelson (May 7, 1933 – September 29, 2021) was a Canadian animator. He was most noted as the director of the 1971 animated short film Propaganda Message, and the "B-17" segment of the 1981 animated anthology film Heavy Metal.

== Early life and career ==
A native of Winnipeg, he studied fine art at the University of Manitoba. He worked for Canadian animation studios for a number of years before moving to Hollywood, where he joined John Hubley's studio and was one of the animators of the Academy Award-winning A Herb Alpert and the Tijuana Brass Double Feature. He had a number of other animation credits, both with Hubley and on various animated television series, before making Propaganda Message for the National Film Board of Canada in 1971; the film won a gold award at the first USA International Animation Film Festival in New York City in 1972.

Nelson also worked on the 1978 animated adaptation of Watership Down and the 1990 TV special Garfield's Feline Fantasies.

== Films ==
Nelson also later made the short film Ten: The Magic Number, about the adoption of the metric system in Canada, for the NFB. In the United States he continued to work on animated films and television series, and made at least four short films that were submitted for Academy Award for Best Animated Short Film consideration: Keep Cool (1971), Twins (1974), Opens Wednesday (1980), and You Can't Teach an Old Dog New Tricks (1984).

== Death ==
Nelson died in Haiku, Hawaii on September 29, 2021, at the age of 88.

== See also ==
- Animation in the United States in the television era
- Independent animation
