= Hot Stuff (1971 film) =

- Directed by: Zlatko Grgic
- Screenplay by: Don Arioli
- Produced by: Wolf Koenig; Robert Verrall
- Starring: Don Arioli (voice); Gerald Budner (voice); John Howe (voice)
- Cinematography: Simon LeBlanc (animation camera)
- Music by: Bill Brooks
- Production company: National Film Board of Canada
- Release date: 1971
- Running time: 9 minutes
- Country: Canada
- Languages: English, French

Hot Stuff is a 1971 animated short directed and animated by Zlatko Grgic and written by Don Arioli. Produced by the National Film Board of Canada for the Dominion Fire Commission, a department of Public Works Canada, the nine-minute short on fire safety offers a humorous look at the origins, benefits and dangers of fire.

== Production ==
Grgic was recruited for the NFB by producers Robert Verrall and Wolf Koenig after they saw his film Scabies. Much of Hot Stuff's humour had been initially improvised; Gerald Budner, who was himself an animator, ad-libbed voices for two of the characters, a snake and a cat. Arioli had been annoyed with Budner's banter, but Koenig insisted on retaining these asides. Grgic was also given freedom to improvise by the producers.

== Release ==
Hot Stuff was one of seven NFB animated shorts acquired by the American Broadcasting Company, marking the first time NFB films had been sold to a major American television network. It aired on ABC in the fall of 1971 as part of the children's television show Curiosity Shop, executive produced by Chuck Jones. It also aired (minus the opening & closing credits) on The Great Space Coaster in the 1980s.

== Awards ==
- International Animation Film Festival, New York: Grand Prix - Silver Praxinoscope, Educational, 1972
- World Festival of Animated Films, Zagreb: Best Educational Film, 1972
- Atlanta Film Festival: Gold Medal, Safety, 1972
- Melbourne Film Festival, Melbourne: Diploma of Merit, 1972
- International Short Film Festival Oberhausen, Oberhausen, Germany: Diploma of the International Council of Graphic Design Associations, 1972
- National Committee on Films for Safety, Chicago: Bronze Plaque, 1972
- 23rd Canadian Film Awards, Toronto: Best Screenplay, Fiction, Don Arioli, 1971, for both Hot Stuff and Propaganda Message
