= Břetislav Pojar =

Czech puppeteer, animator and director

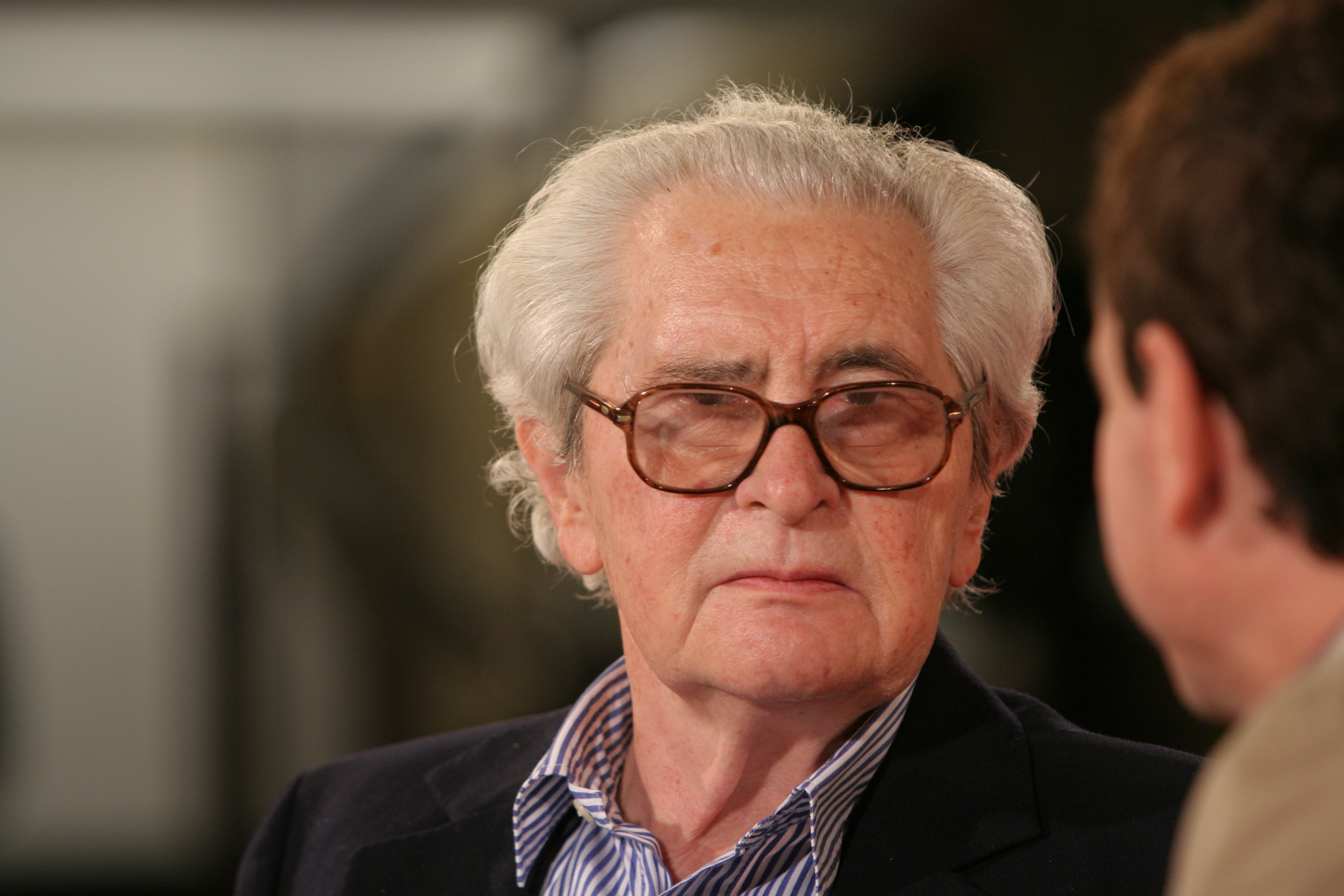
Břetislav Pojar at 42nd KVIFF

Břetislav Pojar (7 October 1923 – 12 October 2012) was a Czech puppeteer, animator and director of short and feature films.

== Biography ==
Born in Sušice, Czechoslovakia, Pojar started his career in the late 1940s with his work on The Story of the Bass Cello (1949) based on the story by Anton Chekhov and directed by master Czech puppet animator Jiří Trnka. Pojar served as a puppeteer under his mentor Trnka.

Pojar compiled an extensive body of work as a director and animator in Czechoslovakia, where he made films in both puppet animation to the more common stop motion animation. He worked with the United Nations for the two films Boom and The Big If (with Vaclav Strnad worked as a producer in the latter). Pojar's work is characterized by strong social commentary, such as in Balablok, where armies of small circle- and square-shaped beings war with each other until they are all wounded into indistinguishable shapes. Often, Pojar's shorts contain little or no spoken dialogue.

In the mid-1960s, Pojar emigrated to Canada, where he began a long collaboration with the National Film Board. His Canadian work is some of his best known, and it has won awards at prestigious international film festivals. His film To See or Not to See (Psychocratie) won the Canadian Film Award for Film of the Year in 1970.

In the mid-2000s, Pojar moved back to the Czech film business in order to co-direct the collaborative animated feature film Fimfárum 2 (based on the stories of Jan Werich), which was released in 2006.

In 2012, Pojar died in Prague aged 89.

== Awards ==
- 1960—Annecy Cristal Grand Prix for The Lion and the Song.
- c. 1969—Canadian Film of the Year: To See or Not To See.
- c. 1969—Berlin International Film Festival: Best Short Film Award for To See or Not To See.
- 1972—Cannes Film Festival: Best Short Film Award for Balablok.
- 1979—Cannes Film Festival: Best Short Film Jury Prize for Bum.
- 1981—Berlin International Film Festival: Canadian Film of the Year: Otto Dibelius Film Award for New Media for E.
- 1987—World Animation Celebration: L.A. Film Critic's Award for Nightangel.
- 2006—AniFest (Czech Republic): Best Feature-Length Film Award for Fimfárum 2.
- 2007—Festival of European Animated Feature Films and TV Specials (Hungary): Best TV Special for Tom Thumb from Fimfárum 2.
