= List of Canadian films of the 1960s =

This is a list of Canadian films that were released in the 1960s.

Title	Director	Cast	Genre	Notes
1960
Circle of the Sun	Colin Low		Documentary	
Frames of Reference	Richard Leacock		Documentary	
Universe	Roman Kroitor, Colin Low		NFB animated/live-action short	Nominee at the 33rd Academy Awards in the category of Best Documentary Short Subject
1961
1 + 1 (Exploring the Kinsey Reports)	Arch Oboler	Leo G. Carroll, Kate Reid, Austin Willis, Douglas Rain, Barbara Hamilton	Docudrama	
The Canadians	Burt Kennedy	Robert Ryan, John Dehner, Torin Thatcher, Burt Metcalfe	Western	UK-Canada coproduction
Golden Gloves	Gilles Groulx		NFB short	
The Hired Gun	Lindsay Shonteff	Don Borisenko, Tass Tory, Jay Shannon		
Macbeth	Paul Almond	Sean Connery		CBC-TV drama
The Mask	Julian Roffman	Paul Stevens, Claudette Nevins, Anne Collings, Martin Lavut	Horror	
Morning on the Lièvre	David Bairstow		NFB short	Canadian Film Award – Theatrical Short; Berlin Film Festival – Silver Bear for Short Film
Nikki, Wild Dog of the North	Jack Couffer & Don Haldane	Jean Coutu, Émile Genest, Uriel Luft, Robert Rivard	Family film	The first of three live-action films made in Canada by Disney, with a Canadian co-producing partner.
Very Nice, Very Nice	Arthur Lipsett		NFB experimental short	It was nominated for the Academy Award for Best Live Action Short Film at the 34th Academy Awards.
Wings of Chance	Edward Dew	James Brown, Frances Rafferty, Richard Tretter, Patrick Whyte	Drama	
Wrestling (La Lutte)	Michel Brault, Claude Jutra, Marcel Carrière & Claude Fournier		NFB short	
1962
À St-Henri le cinq septembre	Hubert Aquin		NFB documentary	
Alone or With Others (Seul ou avec autres)	Denis Héroux, Denys Arcand, Stéphane Venne	Nicole Braun, Pierre Létourneau, Marie-José Raymond	Drama	Student film and Denys Arcand's first directorial credit
Big Red	Norman Tokar	Walter Pidgeon, Gilles Payant, Émile Genest, Janette Bertrand	Family film	The third of three co-productions with Disney
Day After Day (Jour après jour)	Clément Perron		Documentary	
Drylanders	Don Haldane	Frances Hyland, James Douglas, William Fruet	NFB drama	NFB's first English-language feature
Lonely Boy	Roman Kroitor, Wolf Koenig		NFB documentary	This National Film Board of Canada production won a Canadian Film Award as top film of the year.
Manouane River Lumberjacks (Bûcherons de la Manouane)	Arthur Lamothe		NFB documentary	
My Financial Career	Gerald Potterton		Animated short	
Nahanni	Albert Faille		NFB documentary	
1963
À tout prendre	Claude Jutra	Claude Jutra, Johanne Harrelle	Drama	Best Picture at the 1964 Canadian Film Awards.
Amanita Pestilens	René Bonnière	Jacques Labrecque, Huguette Oligny, Geneviève Bujold	Drama	
Anniversary	William Weintraub	Walter Pidgeon	Documentary	
The Bitter Ash	Larry Kent	Alan Scarfe, Lynn Stewart, Philip Brown, Diane Griffith	Drama	
Christmas Cracker	Norman McLaren, Jeff Hale, Gerald Potterton & Grant Munro		NFB animated short	Nominee for an Academy Award for Best Animated Short Film at the 37th Academy Awards.
The Incredible Journey	Fletcher Markle	Émile Genest, John Drainie, Tommy Tweed	Family film	The most famous of a trio of live-action animal films from Disney shot in Canada.
Pour la suite du monde	Michel Brault & Pierre Perrault		NFB documentary	AV Preservation Trust Masterwork
1964
21-87	Arthur Lipsett		NFB experimental short	
23 Skidoo	Julian Biggs		NFB experimental short	
Canon	Norman McLaren, Grant Munro		Animated short	
The Cat in the Bag (Le Chat dans le sac)	Gilles Groulx	Barbara Ulrich, Claude Godbout, Manon Blain, Véronique Vilbert	Drama	An essential feature of early Quebec cinema. AV Preservation Trust Masterwork
The Earth to Drink (La terre à boire)	Jean-Paul Bernier	Genevieve Bujold, Pauline Julien, Patricia Nolin, Gilles Pelletier	Drama	
Eskimo Artist: Kenojuak	John Feeney		NFB short	Academy Award nominee
Fields of Sacrifice	Donald Brittain		Documentary	
Geneviève	Michel Brault	Geneviève Bujold, Louise Marleau, Bernard Arcand	Short drama	Also released as part of the international anthology film The Adolescents (La Fleur de l'âge, ou Les adolescentes)
The Luck of Ginger Coffey	Irvin Kershner	Robert Shaw, Mary Ure, Liam Redmond, Tom Harvey, Libby McClintock	Drama	
Nobody Waved Good-bye	Don Owen	Peter Kastner, Julie Biggs, Claude Rae, Toby Tarnow, Charmion King, John Vernon	Drama	An essential feature of early English-Canadian cinema; AV Preservation Trust Masterwork
Over My Head (Jusqu'au cou)	Denis Héroux	Raymond Levasseur, Édith de Villers, Guy Dufresne	Drama	Student film most noted for pre-political participation of future politicians Pierre Bourgault, Bernard Landry and Pierre Trudeau
Return to Oz	F. R. Crawley, Thomas Glynn, Larry Roemer	Carl Banas, Susan Conway, Peggi Loder, Susan Morse, Larry D. Mann, Alfie Scopp	Animated	
Rudolph the Red-Nosed Reindeer	Larry Roemer		Animated	
Sweet Substitute	Larry Kent	Robert Howay, Angela Gann, Carol Pastinsky	Drama	
Trouble-Maker (Trouble fête)	Pierre Patry	Lucien Hamelin, Jean Duceppe, Yves Létourneau	Drama	
Walls of Memory (Mémoire en fête)	Léonard Forest		Short documentary	
1965
60 Cycles	Jean-Claude Labrecque		NFB documentary	Canadian Film Award – Cinematography
Bethune	Donald Brittain	Donald Sutherland	NFB documentary	
Buster Keaton Rides Again	John Spotton	Buster Keaton	Documentary	
High Steel	Don Owen		Documentary	
Ladies and Gentlemen... Mr. Leonard Cohen	Donald Brittain, Don Owen	Leonard Cohen	NFB documentary	Canadian Film Award – TV Information
Memorandum	Donald Brittain, John Spotton		Documentary	
The Merry World of Leopold Z (La vie heureuse de Léopold Z)	Gilles Carle	Guy L’Écuyer, Paul Hébert	Comedy	
The Mills of the Gods: Viet Nam	Beryl Fox		Documentary	Broadcast on CBC-TV; Canadian Film Award – Film of the Year
Mission of Fear (Astataïon, ou Le Festin des morts)	Fernand Dansereau	Jean-Guy Sabourin, Alain Cuny, Jacques Godin, Monique Mercure	NFB drama	
The Railrodder	Gerald Potterton	Buster Keaton	NFB short	
The Revolutionary (Le révolutionnaire)	Jean Pierre Lefebvre		Drama	
Rope Around the Neck (La Corde au cou)	Pierre Patry	Guy Godin, Andrée Lachapelle, Henri Norbert, Jean Duceppe	Drama	
The Snow Has Melted on the Manicouagan (La neige a fondu sur la Manicouagan)	Arthur Lamothe	Monique Miller, Gilles Vigneault, Jean Doyon, Margot Campbell	Docufiction	
Summer in Mississippi	Beryl Fox		Documentary	Broadcast on CBC-TV
A Trip Down Memory Lane	Arthur Lipsett		Collage film	
When Tomorrow Dies	Larry Kent	Patricia Gage, Douglas Campbell, Neil Dainard	Drama	
Willy McBean and His Magic Machine	Arthur Rankin Jr., Kizo Nagashima	Larry D. Mann, Billie Mae Richards, Paul Soles, Alfie Scopp	Animated	
Winter Kept Us Warm	David Secter	John Labow, Henry Tarvainen, Joy Fielding	Drama	
1966
Angel	Derek May	Leonard Cohen	NFB short	CFA – Arts and Experimental
The Drag	Carlos Marchiori		Animated short	
Footsteps in the Snow (Des pas sur la neige)	Martin Green	Peter Kastner, Ovila Légaré, Veronica Lake	Thriller	
Ghosts of a River (Trois hommes au mille carré)	Pierre Patry, Jacques Kasma		Documentary	
Helicopter Canada	Eugene Boyko		NFB documentary	Nominated for an Academy Award for Best Documentary Feature at the 39th Academy Awards.
Le Misanthrope	Louis-Georges Carrier	Guy Provost, Albert Millaire	Drama	A film record of a stage performance of the Molière play, thought to be the first in Canada, produced and distributed by Quebec’s film office and Ministry of Education.
Never a Backward Step	Donald Brittain, Arthur Hammond, John Spotton		Documentary	
Notes for a Film About Donna and Gail	Don Owen	Michèle Chicoine, Jackie Burroughs	Short drama	
Notes on a Triangle	René Jodoin		NFB animated short	BAFTA – Animated Short
The Offering	David Secter	Kee Faun, Ratch Wallace	Drama	
Op Hop - Hop Op	Pierre Hébert		Animated short	
Paddle to the Sea	Bill Mason		NFB animated short	Nominated for an Academy Award for Best Live Action Short Film at the 40th Academy Awards.
The Scribe	John Sebert	Buster Keaton	Comedy short	
The Trap	Sidney Hayers	Rita Tushingham, Oliver Reed	Adventure	
Transfer	David Cronenberg	Mort Ritts, Rafe Macpherson	Short drama	
What on Earth!	Les Drew, Kaj Pindal	Narrated by Donald Brittain	NFB animated short	Nominated for an Academy Award for Best Animated Short Film at the 40th Academy Awards.
YUL 871	Jacques Godbout	Charles Denner, Andrée Lachapelle, Paul Buissonneau, Jean Duceppe	Drama	
1967
Between Salt and Sweet Water (Entre la mer et l'eau douce)	Michel Brault	Claude Gauthier, Geneviève Bujold, Paul Gauthier, Robert Charlebois	Drama	
Canada '67	Robert Barclay		Documentary	
A Child in His Country (Un enfant...un pays)	Pierre Moretti		Animated short	
Do Not Fold, Staple, Spindle or Mutilate	John Howe	Ed Begley, Bruno Gerussi, Al Waxman	Drama	
Don't Let It Kill You (Il ne faut pas mourir pour ça)	Jean Pierre Lefebvre		Drama	
The Ernie Game	Don Owen	Alexis Kanner, Judith Gault, Jackie Burroughs, Derek May	Drama	CBC-TV/NFB co-production.
La Fleur d’âge: Geneviève	Michel Brault	Geneviève Bujold, Louise Marleau, Bernard Arcand	Short	
Flowers on a One-Way Street	Robin Spry		NFB documentary	
The Fox	Mark Rydell	Sandy Dennis, Anne Heywood, Keir Dullea	Drama	
From the Drain	David Cronenberg		Short	
High	Larry Kent	Lanning Beckman, Peter Mathews	Drama	
The House that Jack Built	Ron Tunis		NFB animated short	Nominated for an Academy Award for Best Animated Short Film at the 41st Academy Awards.
In the Labyrinth	Roman Kroitor, Colin Low, Hugh O'Connor		Multi-screen	Major attraction at Expo 67 precursor to IMAX
The Paper People	David Gardner	Marc Strange, Marigold Charlesworth	Drama	
A Place to Stand	Christopher Chapman		Short	Academy Award, Best Documentary Short Subject nominee and winner for Best Live Action Short Subject.
The Sweet and the Bitter	James Clavell	Yoko Tani, Torin Thatacher, Jane Mallett	Drama	
The Things I Cannot Change	Tanya Ballantyne	Kenneth Bailey, Gertrude Bailey	Documentary	
This Is No Time for Romance (Ça n'est pas le temps des romans)	Fernand Dansereau	Monique Mercure, Marc Favreau	Short drama	
The Times That Are (Le Règne du jour)	Pierre Perrault		NFB documentary	
The Vulture	Lawrence Huntington	Akim Tamiroff, Broderick Crawford	Horror	Canada-U.K. co-production
Waiting for Caroline	Ron Kelly	Alexandra Stewart, François Tassé, Sharon Acker	Drama	CBC-TV/NFB co-production
Warrendale	Allan King		Documentary	
Wavelength	Michael Snow	Hollis Frampton, Joyce Weiland	Structural film	AV Preservation Trust Masterwork
We Are Young	Alexander Hammid, Francis Thompson		Documentary	
With Drums and Trumpets (Avec tambours et trompettes)	Marcel Carrière		NFB documentary	Canadian Film Award – Short Documentary
1968
At Home	Martin Lavut	Martin Lavut, Adrienne Horswill	Short documentary	
The Ballad of Crowfoot	Willie Dunn		Documentary	
The Best Damn Fiddler from Calabogie to Kaladar	Peter Pearson	Chris Wiggins, Kate Reid, Margot Kidder	NFB drama	
Christopher's Movie Matinée	Mort Ransen		NFB documentary	
Cosmic Zoom	Eva Szasz		Animated short	
Dust from Underground (Poussière sur la ville)	Arthur Lamothe	Guy Sanche, Michelle Rossignol	Drama	
A Great Big Thing	Eric Till	Reni Santoni, Louise Latraverse, Paul Sand	Drama	
Isabel	Paul Almond	Geneviève Bujold, Marc Strange, Gerard Parkes, Al Waxman	Drama	AV Preservation Trust Masterwork
It Isn't Jacques Cartier's Fault (C'est pas la faute à Jacques Cartier)	Clément Perron, Georges Dufaux	Jacques Desrosiers, Paul Buissonneau, Paul Hébert	Comedy	
Juggernaut	Eugene Boyko		Documentary	
Kid Sentiment	Jacques Godbout	Andrée Cousineau, François Guy, Michèle Mercure, Louis Parizeau	Docufiction	
The Man Who Wanted Nothing	Mary Walker-Sawka	Wallace McSween, Marilyn Marsh	Drama	
Pas de deux	Norman McLaren		NFB animated short	Academy Award nominee
Patricia and Jean-Baptiste (Patricia et Jean-Baptiste)	Jean Pierre Lefebvre	Jean Pierre Lefebvre, Patricia Kaden-Lacroix	Comedy-drama	
Rat Life and Diet in North America	Joyce Weiland		Experimental	
The Rape of a Sweet Young Girl (Le Viol d'une jeune fille douce)	Gilles Carle	Daniel Pilon, Donald Pilon, André Gagnon	Drama	
The Rise and Fall of the Great Lakes	Bill Mason		NFB short	
The River Schooners (Les Voitures d'eau)	Pierre Perrault		NFB documentary	
Straight to the Heart (Jusqu'au coeur)	Jean Pierre Lefebvre	Robert Charlebois, Claudine Monfette	Experimental drama	Made for the NFB
The Strange Case of Dr. Jekyll and Mr. Hyde	Charles Jarrott	Jack Palance, Denholm Elliott, Leo Genn, Torin Thatcher	Drama	
Vienna	Orson Welles		Documentary	
Walking	Ryan Larkin		NFB animated short	Academy Award nominee
1969
<---> (Back and Forth)	Michael Snow		Experimental	
All About Women	Claude Pierson		Drama	
And No Birds Sing	Victor Cowie	Ian Malcolm, Marsha Sadoway, Michael Posner, Judy Daniels, Brian Stavechny	Drama	
Bambi Meets Godzilla	Marv Newland		Animated	
Blake	Bill Mason	Blake James	NFB short	Academy Award nominee
Circle	Jack Chambers		Experimental	
Deliver Us from Evil (Délivrez-nous du mal)	Jean-Claude Lord	Yvon Deschamps, Guy Godin	Melodrama	
Don't Let the Angels Fall	George Kaczender	Arthur Hill, Sharon Acker, Charmion King, Monique Mercure	Drama	
Dulcima	Matt Segal	Jackie Burroughs, John Colicos, Chuck Shamata	Drama	
Good Times Bad Times	Donald Shebib		Documentary	
Hey, Cinderella!	Jim Henson	The Muppets	Television film	
The House of Light (Le Chambre blanche)	Jean Pierre Lefebvre	Michèle Magny, Marcel Sabourin	Drama	
A Married Couple	Allan King		Documentary	
A Matter of Fat	William Weintraub		Documentary	
My Friend Pierrette (Mon amie Pierrette)	Jean Pierre Lefebvre		Drama	
Reason Over Passion	Joyce Weiland		Experimental	
Stereo	David Cronenberg	Ronald Mlodzik	Short	
To See Or Not to See (Psychocratie)	Bretislav Pojar		NFB animated short	Canadian Film Award – Film of the Year, Animated Short; Berlin Film Festival – Golden Bear for Short Film
Valérie	Denis Héroux	Danielle Ouimet, Guy Godin, Yvan Ducharme, Claude Préfontaine		
Vertige	Jean Beaudin		Documentary	
Wow	Claude Jutra		Docudrama	
You Are on Indian Land	Mike Kanentakeron Mitchell		Documentary	
