= 2005 Toronto International Film Festival =

Annual Canadian film festival

- Festival poster
- Opening film: Water
- Closing film: Edison
- Location: Toronto, Ontario, Canada
- Hosted by: Toronto International Film Festival Group
- No. of films: 335 films
- Festival date: September 8, 2005–September 17, 2005
- Language: English
- Website: tiff.net
- 2006 2004

The 30th Toronto International Film Festival ran from September 8–17 and screened 335 films from 52 countries - 109 of these films were world premieres, and 78 were North American premieres.

== Awards ==
At the Festival's closing event, the following prizes were awarded:

- The People's Choice Award, presented to Gavin Hood's Tsotsi.
- The Discovery Award, presented to Sarah Watt's Look Both Ways.
- The Fipresci Prize, presented to South Korean director Kang Yi-kwan for Sa-kwa.
- A tie for the Citytv Award for Best Canadian First Feature, presented to Louise Archambault's Familia and Michael Mabbott's The Life and Hard Times of Guy Terrifico.
- The Toronto – City Award for Best Canadian Feature Film, presented to C.R.A.Z.Y. directed by Jean-Marc Vallée.
- The Bravo!FACT Short Cuts Canada Award, presented to Renuka Jeyapalan's Big Girl (Honourable mention to Andrea Dorfman's There's a Flower in My Pedal).

Because the vote for the People's Choice Award was so close, at the awards ceremony Piers Handling (festival co-director) announced four runners-up. However, in the subsequent reporting there was confusion about the order of the runners-up. As reported by ScreenDaily, the results of the People's Choice Award voting was as follows:

- winner - Tsotsi (dir. Gavin Hood)
- 2nd place - Live and Become (dir. Radu Mihaileanu)
- 3rd place - Dreamer: Inspired By A True Story (dir. John Gatins)
- 4th place - Brokeback Mountain (dir. Ang Lee)
- 5th place - Mother of Mine (dir. Klaus Härö)

Certain other publications indicated (probably erroneously) that the order of the runners-up was reversed, with Mother of Mine finishing second to Tsotsi.

== Programme ==
=== Canada First ===
- The Cabin Movie, Dylan Akio Smith
- Drifting States (Les États nordiques), Denis Côté
- Eve and the Fire Horse, Julia Kwan
- Familia, Louise Archambault
- Fetching Cody, David Ray
- The Life and Hard Times of Guy Terrifico, Michael Mabbott
- Saint Martyrs of the Damned (Saint-Martyrs-des-Damnés), Robin Aubert
- A Simple Curve, Aubrey Nealon
- Six Figures, David Christensen
- These Girls, John Hazlett

=== Canadian Open Vault ===
- Between Salt and Sweet Water (Entre la mer et l'eau douce), Michel Brault

=== Canadian Retrospective ===
Featuring Don Owen

- Cowboy and Indian
- The Ernie Game
- Gallery: A View of Time
- High Steel
- Ladies and Gentlemen... Mr. Leonard Cohen
- Monique Leyrac in Concert
- Nobody Waved Good-bye
- Notes for a Film About Donna and Gail
- Partners
- Richler of St. Urbain Street
- Runner
- Snow in Venice
- Toronto Jazz
- Turnabout
- Unfinished Business
- You Don't Back Down

=== Contemporary World Cinema ===
- 06/05: The Sixth of May, Theo van Gogh
- Adam's Apples, Anders Thomas Jensen
- All Souls, Ger Beukenkamp, Peter de Baan, Mijke de Jong, Constant Dullaart, Rita Horst, David Lammers, Tim Oliehoek, Rob Schröder, Hanro Smitsman, Norbert ter Hall, Eddy Terstall, Maarten Treurniet, Meral Uslu, Marco van Geffen, Michiel van Jaarsveld, Nicole van Kilsdonk, Mariecke van der Linden, Gerrard Verhage.
- American Gun, Aric Avelino
- Amu, Shonali Bose
- Angel Rodriguez, Jim McKay
- Backstage, Emmanuelle Bercot
- Battle in Heaven, Carlos Reygadas
- Border Café, Kambuzia Partovi
- Brooklyn Lobster, Kevin Jordan (filmmaker)
- C.R.A.Z.Y., Jean-Marc Vallée
- Citizen Dog, Wisit Sasanatieng
- Dear Wendy, Thomas Vinterberg
- The Death of Mr. Lazarescu, Cristi Puiu
- Dodging the Clock (Horloge biologique), Ricardo Trogi
- Douches froides, Antony Cordier
- Dreaming of Space, Alexey Uchitel
- Eleven Men Out, Róbert I. Douglas
- The Fatalist, João Botelho
- The French Guy, Ann Marie Fleming
- Good Girl, Sophie Fillières
- Gilane, Rakhshan Bani-Etemad, Mohsen Abdolvahab
- The Grönholm Method, Marcelo Piñeyro
- I'm the Angel of Death - Pusher III, Nicolas Winding Refn
- Iron Island, Mohammad Rasoulof
- The Last Hangman, Adrian Shergold
- Linda Linda Linda, Nobuhiro Yamashita
- Life with My Father (La Vie avec mon père), Sébastien Rose
- Lucid, Sean Garrity
- Mario's War, Antonio Capuano
- Marock, Laïla Marrakchi
- Mother of Mine, Klaus Härö
- The Novena (La Neuvaine), Bernard Émond
- October 17, 1961, Alain Tasma
- One Last Thing . . ., Alex Steyermark
- Opa!, Udayan Prasad
- Paradise Now, Hany Abu-Assad
- The Passion of Joshua the Jew, Pasquale Scimeca
- Perpetual Motion, Ning Ying
- The President's Last Bang, Im Sang-soo
- Pusher, Nicolas Winding Refn
- River Queen, Vincent Ward
- Riviera, Anne Villacèque
- Runaway, Tim McCann
- Shadowboxer, Lee Daniels
- Shanghai Dreams, Wang Xiaoshuai
- Shooting Dogs, Michael Caton-Jones
- Something Like Happiness, Bohdan Sláma
- Sud Express, Chema de la Peña, Gabriel Velázquez
- Summer in Berlin, Andreas Dresen
- Sunflower, Zhang Yang
- Le Temps qui reste, François Ozon
- Transamerica, Duncan Tucker
- À travers la forêt, Jean Paul Civeyrac
- Tsotsi, Gavin Hood
- 12 and Holding, Michael Cuesta
- U-Carmen e-Khayelitsha, Mark Dornford-May
- Va, Vis et Deviens, Radu Mihaileanu
- Viva Cuba, Juan Carlos Cremata Malberti
- Whole New Thing, Amnon Buchbinder
- The Willow Tree, Majid Majidi
- With Blood on My Hands - Pusher II, Nicolas Winding Refn

=== Dialogues: Talking With Pictures ===
- Ghosts... of the Civil Dead, John Hillcoat
- Liza with a 'Z', Bob Fosse
- Midnight Movies: From the Margin to the Mainstream, Stuart Samuels
- My Dad Is 100 Years Old, Guy Maddin
- Rome, Open City, Roberto Rossellini
- Stranded In Canton, William Eggleston, Robert Gordon
- The Wild, Wild Rose, Wong Tin Lam
- William Eggleston in the Real World, Michael Almereyda

=== Discovery ===
- 7 Virgins, Alberto Rodríguez
- Bam Bam and Celeste, Lorene Machado
- Benares, Barlen Pyamootoo
- Conversations on a Sunday Afternoon, Khalo Matabane
- Dam Street, Li Yu
- Day Break, Hamid Rahmanian
- Do U Cry 4 Me Argentina?, Bae Youn-suk
- Dreaming Lhasa, Ritu Sarin, Tenzing Sonam
- Festival, Annie Griffin
- Kinetta, Yorgos Lanthimos
- Little Athens, Tom Zuber
- Look Both Ways, Sarah Watt
- The Masseur, Brillante Mendoza
- Pavee Lackeen, Perry Ogden
- A Perfect Day, Joana Hadjithomas, Khalil Joreige
- Sa-kwa, Kang Yi-Kwan
- Shark in the Head, Maria Procházková
- The Shore, Dionysius Zervos
- Sisters, Julia Solomonoff
- Someone Else's Happiness, Fien Troch
- Sorry, Haters, Jeff Stanzler
- Stoned, Stephen Woolley
- Time Off, Francisca Schweitzer, Pablo Solís
- The War Within, Joseph Castelo
- You Bet Your Life, Antonin Svoboda

=== Masters ===
- Breakfast on Pluto, Neil Jordan
- Brokeback Mountain, Ang Lee
- Bubble, Steven Soderbergh
- Caché, Michael Haneke
- L'Enfant, Jean-Pierre Dardenne, Luc Dardenne
- Free Zone, Amos Gitai
- Iberia, Carlos Saura
- Manderlay, Lars von Trier
- Memories In The Mist, Budhdhadeb Dasgupta
- Memory for Max, Claire, Ida and Company, Allan King
- No Direction Home: Bob Dylan, Martin Scorsese
- Obaba, Montxo Armendáriz
- The Sun, Alexander Sokurov
- Takeshis', Takeshi Kitano
- Three Times, Hou Hsiao-hsien
- Tideland, Terry Gilliam

=== Mavericks ===
- Mavericks: Albert Maysles
- Mavericks: Ivan Reitman
- Mavericks: Laurie Anderson
- Mavericks: Nick Park

=== Midnight Madness ===
- Bangkok Loco, Pornchai Hongrattanaporn
- Banlieue 13, Pierre Morel
- The District!, Áron Gauder
- Evil Aliens, Jake West
- The Great Yokai War, Takashi Miike
- Hostel, Eli Roth
- Isolation, Billy O'Brien
- Metal: A Headbanger's Journey, Sam Dunn, Scot McFadyen, Jessica Joy Wise
- Sarah Silverman: Jesus Is Magic, Liam Lynch
- SPL: Sha Po Lang, Wilson Yip

=== Real To Reel ===
- 3 Friends, Mingmongkol Sonakul, Aditya Assarat, Pumin Chinaradee
- 51 Birch Street, Doug Block
- a/k/a Tommy Chong, Josh Gilbert
- All About Darfur, Taghreed Elsanhouri
- Ballets Russes, Dan Geller, Dayna Goldfine
- Black Bull, Pedro González-Rubio, Carlos Armella
- Black Sun, Gary Tarn
- China Blue, Micha Peled
- A Conversation with Basquiat, Tamra Davis
- The Devil and Daniel Johnston, Jeff Feuerzig
- Diameter of the Bomb, Steven Silver, Andrew Quigley
- The Giant Buddhas, Christian Frei
- The Heart of the Game, Ward Serrill
- Into Great Silence, Philip Groening
- John & Jane, Ashim Ahluwalia
- Leonard Cohen: I'm Your Man, Lian Lunson
- Overcoming, Tómas Gislason
- Pick Up the Mic, Alex Hinton
- Sisters in Law, Kim Longinotto, Florence Ayisi
- The Smell of Paradise, Mariusz Pilis, Marcin Mamon
- Souvenir of Canada, Robin Neinstein
- Twelve Disciples of Nelson Mandela, Thomas Allen Harris
- We Feed the World, Erwin Wagenhofer
- The Well, Kristian Petri
- Why We Fight, Eugene Jarecki
- Workingman's Death, Michael Glawogger
- Zizek!, Astra Taylor

=== Short Cuts Canada ===
- Une Âme nue glisse à l'eau vive, Denis Chabot
- The Argument (A 'Burnt Toast' Opera), Larry Weinstein
- At the Quinte Hotel, Bruce Alcock
- Benediction, Tess Girard
- Berlin, Sarah Galea-Davis
- Big Girl, Renuka Jeyapalan
- Claude, Stéphane Lafleur, Louis-David Morasse
- cNote, Christopher Hinton
- Day of John, Christopher R. Nash
- Dumb Angel, Deco Dawson
- The First Day of My Life, David Uloth
- A Half Man, Firas Momani
- Hide, Byron Lamarque
- Hiro, Matthew Swanson
- Lake, Ryan Redford
- Leo, David Hyde
- Letters From R, Ross Turnbull
- Liberté conditionnelle, Constant Mentzas
- A Little Death - Cut Keith Cole, Michael Caines, Keith Cole
- Mixed Signals, Richard Martin
- My Uncle Navy and Other Inherited Disorders, Adam Swica
- Noise, Greg Spottiswood
- One Balloon, Aram Hekinian, Aruna Naimji
- Patterns, Jamie Travis
- Phone Call From Imaginary Girlfriend: Ankara, Don McKellar
- Phone Call From Imaginary Girlfriend: Istanbul, Don McKellar
- The Racist Brick, Adam Brodie, Dave Derewlany
- Room 710, Ann Marie Fleming
- Red (Le Rouge au sol), Maxime Giroux
- Shoulders on a Map, Jason Britski
- Still Life, Jon Knautz
- Tell Me, Shandi Mitchell
- There's a Flower in My Pedal, Andrea Dorfman
- Troll Concerto, Alexandre Franchi
- The True Story of Sawney Beane, Elizabeth Hobbs
- Unlocked, Sook-Yin Lee
- Unwritten..., Kaare Andrews
- Vancouver, Jesse McKeown
- Waiting, Jamie M. Dagg
- The Waldo Cumberbund Story, Simon Ennis
- what's up with the kids?, Simon Davidson
- The White Chapel (Une chapelle blanche), Simon Lavoie
- The Wrong Number, Adam Brodie, Dave Derewlany
- Yesterday in Rwanda, Davina Pardo

=== Special Presentations ===
- 3 Needles, Thom Fitzgerald
- All the Invisible Children, Mehdi Charef, Emir Kusturica, Spike Lee, Kátia Lund, Jordan and Sir Ridley Scott, Stefano Veneruso, John Woo
- Les Amants Réguliers, Philippe Garrel
- April Snow, Hur Jin-ho
- Art Project: Ghosts of Woodrow, Graeme Patterson
- Bee Season, Scott McGehee, David Siegel
- Beowulf & Grendel, Sturla Gunnarsson
- Capote, Bennett Miller
- Dave Chappelle's Block Party, Michel Gondry
- Entre ses mains, Anne Fontaine
- Everlasting Regret, Stanley Kwan
- Everything Is Illuminated, Liev Schreiber
- Fateless, Lajos Koltai
- Harsh Times, David Ayer
- The House of Sand, Andrucha Waddington
- Imagine Me and You, Ol Parker
- Kiss Kiss, Bang Bang, Shane Black
- Little Fish, Rowan Woods
- A Little Trip to Heaven, Baltasar Kormákur
- Mistress of Spices, Paul Mayeda Berges
- Nanook of the North, Robert J. Flaherty
- Neverwas, Joshua Michael Stern
- The Notorious Bettie Page, Mary Harron
- Oliver Twist, Roman Polanski
- Romance & Cigarettes, John Turturro
- Seven Swords, Tsui Hark
- Shopgirl, Anand Tucker
- Sketches of Frank Gehry, Sydney Pollack
- Slow Burn, Wayne Beach
- The Squid and the Whale, Noah Baumbach
- Sympathy for Lady Vengeance, Park Chan-wook
- Thank You for Smoking, Jason Reitman
- Thumbsucker, Mike Mills
- Tim Burton's Corpse Bride, Tim Burton, Mike Johnson
- Tristram Shandy: A Cock and Bull Story, Michael Winterbottom
- Trust the Man, Bart Freundlich
- Vers Le Sud, Laurent Cantet
- Wah-Wah, Richard E. Grant
- Winter Passing, Adam Rapp
- The World's Fastest Indian, Roger Donaldson
- Zozo, Josef Fares

=== Viacom Galas ===
- Dreamer: Inspired by a True Story, John Gatins
- Edison, David J. Burke
- Elizabethtown, Cameron Crowe
- L'Enfer, Danis Tanović
- A History of Violence, David Cronenberg
- In Her Shoes, Curtis Hanson
- The Matador, Richard Shepard
- Mrs. Harris, Phyllis Nagy
- Mrs Henderson Presents, Stephen Frears
- The Myth, Stanley Tong
- North Country, Niki Caro
- Pride & Prejudice, Joe Wright
- Proof, John Madden
- Revolver, Guy Ritchie
- The Three Burials of Melquiades Estrada, Tommy Lee Jones
- Walk the Line, James Mangold
- Wallace & Gromit: The Curse of the Were-Rabbit, Steve Box, Nick Park
- Water, Deepa Mehta
- Where the Truth Lies, Atom Egoyan
- The White Masai, Hermine Huntgeburth

=== Visions ===
- 50 Ways of Saying Fabulous, Stewart Main
- L'Anullaire, Diane Bertrand
- Attente, Rashid Masharawi
- Be with Me, Eric Khoo
- Bed Stories, Kirill Serebrennikov
- Brothers of the Head, Keith Fulton, Louis Pepe
- Un Couple parfait, Nobuhiro Suwa
- Delicate Crime, Beto Brant
- Drawing Restraint 9, Matthew Barney
- Duelist, Lee Myung-se
- Fallen, Fred Kelemen
- The Forsaken Land, Vimukthi Jayasundara
- Frankie, Fabienne Berthaud
- Gabrielle, Patrice Chéreau
- I Am, Dorota Kędzierzawska
- Lie with Me, Clement Virgo
- Mary, Abel Ferrara
- Monobloc, Luis Ortega
- The Piano Tuner of Earthquakes, Timothy Quay, Stephen Quay
- The Porcelain Doll, Péter Gárdos
- The Proposition, John Hillcoat
- The Quiet, Jamie Babbit
- Les Saignantes, Jean-Pierre Bekolo
- La Trahison, Philippe Faucon
- Twilight, Victoria Gamburg
- Wassup Rockers, Larry Clark
- The Wayward Cloud, Tsai Ming-liang

=== Wavelengths ===
- (Re)collection, Arshia Haq
- Aerial, Margaret Tait
- Album, Matthias Müller
- Black Belt Test Exposure, Lynn Marie Kirby
- Close Quarters, Jim Jennings
- Douro, Faina Fluvial, Manoel de Oliveira
- Essex Street Market, Ernie Gehr
- Fugitive L(i)ght, Izabella Pruska-Oldenhof
- Greene Street, Ernie Gehr
- Half-Moon for Margaret, Ute Aurand
- India, Ute Aurand
- Instructions for a Light and Sound Machine, Peter Tscherkassky
- Lapse Lose All, Kathryn MacKay, Alexi Manis
- Mouse Heaven, Kenneth Anger
- Noon Time Activities, Ernie Gehr
- not a matter of if but when, The Speculative Archive
- Pyramid Lake Paiute Reservation Exposure, Lynn Marie Kirby
- Ruby Skin, Eve Heller
- Shape Shift, Scott Stark
- site specific LAS VEGAS 05, Olivo Barbieri
- site specific ROMA 04, Olivo Barbieri
- SSHTOORRTY, Michael Snow
- Wavelength, Michael Snow
- Workers Leaving the Factory (After Lumière), Ernie Gehr

== Canada's Top Ten ==
In December, TIFF released its annual Canada's Top Ten list of the films programmers had selected as the ten best Canadian films of the year. These were screened as a followup "Canada's Top Ten" minifestival in early 2006, with public screenings in Toronto, Ottawa, Montreal and Vancouver.

- C.R.A.Z.Y., Jean-Marc Vallée
- Dodging the Clock (Horloge biologique), Ricardo Trogi
- Familia, Louise Archambault
- A History of Violence, David Cronenberg
- The Life and Hard Times of Guy Terrifico, Michael Mabbott
- Memory for Max, Claire, Ida and Company, Allan King
- The Novena (La Neuvaine), Bernard Émond
- A Simple Curve, Aubrey Nealon
- Water, Deepa Mehta
- Where the Truth Lies, Atom Egoyan
