= 18th Canadian Film Awards =

Canadian film awards ceremony

- Date: May 6, 1966
- Location: Queen Elizabeth Hotel, Montreal, Quebec
- Hosted by: Rich Little

Highlights
- Most awards: The Mills of the Gods: Viet Nam
- Film of the Year: The Mills of the Gods: Viet Nam
- Best Feature Film: Mission of Fear

The 18th Canadian Film Awards were held on May 6, 1966 to honour achievements in Canadian film.

For the first time, CFA management decided to present the awards on television. The Directors Guild of Canada which, in another first, was presenting CFA awards, voiced what was on everyone's minds: the fear that a poorly-presented show would cause irreparable harm to the CFAs and the industry. After much debate, it was decided that they would go ahead with the live broadcast, which aired coast-to-coast on CBC Television and was hosted by comedian Rich Little.

The telecast was plagued by technical difficulties and criticism was harsh, with journalists and industry members calling it "the poor-man's Oscars". It would be several years before the ceremony was telecast again.

== Films ==
- Film of the Year: The Mills of the Gods: Viet Nam — Canadian Broadcasting Corporation, Douglas Leiterman, Beryl Fox producers, Beryl Fox director
- Feature Film: Le Festin des morts (Mission of Fear) — National Film Board of Canada, André Belleau producer, Fernand Dansereau director
- Arts and Experimental: Syrinx — National Film Board of Canada, Ryan Larkin director
- TV Information: Bernard Shaw: Who the Devil Was He? — Canadian Broadcasting Corporation, Vincent Tovell producer

Stravinsky — National Film Board of Canada, Roman Kroitor producer, Wolf Koenig and Roman Kroitor directors
Ladies and Gentlemen... Mr. Leonard Cohen — National Film Board of Canada, John Kemeny producer, Don Owen and Donald Brittain directors
Certificate of Merit: Huit témoins — National Film Board of Canada, André Belleau producer, Jacques Godbout director
Certificate of Merit:The Mills of the Gods: Viet Nam — Canadian Broadcasting Corporation, Douglas Leiterman, Beryl Fox producers, Beryl Fox director

- TV Entertainment: Cariboo Country: How to Break a Quarter Horse — Canadian Broadcasting Corporation, Philip Keatley and Frank Goodship producers, Philip Keatley director
- Films for Children: Above the Horizon — National Film Board of Canada, Roman Kroitor and Hugh O'Connor producers and directors
- Travel and Recreation: The 1965 Shell 4000 — Moreland-Latchford Productions, James McCormick producer, Peter Gerretsen director

The Railrodder — National Film Board of Canada, Julian Biggs producer, Gerald Potterton director

- General Information: Buster Keaton Rides Again — National Film Board of Canada, Julian Biggs producer, John Spotton director
- Public Relations: Light for the Mind — Chetwynd Films, Arthur Chetwynd producer, Robert Barclay director
- Sales Promotion: Canadian Industries Ltd. — Moreland-Latchford Productions
- Training and Instruction: The Scribe — Film Tele Productions, Ann Heeley-Ray and Kenneth Heeley-Ray producers, John Sebert director

Decision — Westminster Films, Lee Gordon producer

- Amateur: Settlers — John W. Ruddell director

Certificate of Merit: Her Only Love — Scarborough Film Unit
Certificate of Merit: The Knife — Armand Bélanger director

== Feature Film Craft Award ==
- Black and White Cinematography: Georges Dufaux - Le Festin des morts (Mission of Fear) (NFB)

== Non-Feature Craft Awards ==
- Colour Cinematography: Jean-Claude Labrecque and Bernard Gosselin, 60 Cycles (NFB)
- Direction: Ron Kelly, The Gift
- Film Editing: Don Owen, High Steel (NFB)

== Special awards ==
- Un jeu si simple (Such a Simple Game), National Film Board of Canada, Jacques Bobet producer, Gilles Groulx director - "for its success in emphasizing the excitement of hockey through the brilliant mixing of colour and black-and-white photography".
- Guy Roberge, former National Film Board of Canada Commissioner — "for his contribution to the growth of the Canadian film industry".
