= Montreal International Film Festival =

1960s Canadian film festival

The Montreal International Film Festival was an annual Canadian film festival, which took place in Montreal, Quebec from 1960 to 1967.

== History ==
A primarily non-competitive festival, it was led throughout its history by Pierre Juneau as president, with Robert Daudelin as a manager and programmer.

At the fourth festival in 1963, the festival also introduced a competitive parallel Festival of Canadian Films, with a prize presented to the film judged as the best film in the program.

The overall festival developed a positive international reputation, culminating in its hosting the world premiere of the film Bonnie and Clyde in 1967, but the Canadian stream was controversial, with filmmakers often expressing their opposition to the competitive nature of the program. The controversy was most pronounced in 1966, when the jury gave out numerous honorable mentions but declined to name any feature or short winners on the grounds that the films in competition did not measure up to the "concepts and standards of execution that Canadian film-makers have set themselves", and in 1967, when feature co-winners Allan King and Jean Pierre Lefebvre announced a joint decision to share their prize money equally with the other two feature films in competition, Pierre Perrault's The Times That Are (Le Règne du jour) and Michel Brault's Between Salt and Sweet Water (Entre la mer et l'eau douce).

The 1967 jury's choices of Jacques Leduc's Chantal en vrac as the medium-length prize winner and Pierre Hébert's Op Hop - Hop Op as the short prize winner were also criticized, as both films had been heavily booed by the audiences at their screenings, and the festival that year had also been impacted by the Quebec Censor Board's banning of Larry Kent's film High.

The festival was cancelled in 1968.

The new Montreal World Film Festival was launched in 1977, and was also sometimes informally referred to as the Montreal International Film Festival.

== Festival of Canadian Films awards ==
=== 1963 ===
- Grand Prize: Claude Jutra, À tout prendre
- Special Jury Prize, Feature: Pierre Perrault and Michel Brault, Pour la suite du monde
- Best Performance: Johanne Harrelle, À tout prendre
- Short Film: Arthur Lamothe, Manouane River Lumberjacks (Bûcherons de la Manouane)
- Special Jury Prize, Short: Gordon Sheppard, The Most
- Special Citations: Camil Adam, Au plus petit d'entre nous and Cioni Carpi, Le Chat ici et la

=== 1964 ===
- Grand Prize, Feature: Gilles Groulx, The Cat in the Bag (Le Chat dans le sac)
- Special Award, Feature: Pierre Patry, Trouble-Maker (Trouble fête)
- Short Film: Jean Dansereau, Parallèles et grand soleil; Colin Low, The Hutterites
- Special Award, Short Film: Arthur Lipsett, Free Fall; Gilles Carle, Percé on the Rocks
- Best Performance: Claude Godbout, The Cat in the Bag (Le Chat dans le sac)

=== 1965 ===
- Grand Prize, Feature: Gilles Carle, The Merry World of Leopold Z (La vie heureuse de Léopold Z)
- Special Award, Feature: Larry Kent, Sweet Substitute
- Short Film: George Kaczender, Phoebe
- Special Awards, Short Film: Wolf Koenig and Roman Kroitor, Stravinsky; Beryl Fox, Summer in Mississippi; Jean-Claude Labrecque, 60 Cycles
- Best Performance: Dona Saunders, Phoebe

=== 1966 ===
- Grand Prize, Feature: No award presented
- Special Award, Feature: David Secter, Winter Kept Us Warm
- Grand Prize, Medium-Length: John Spotton, Buster Keaton Rides Again; Don Owen, Notes for a Film About Donna and Gail
- Special Mentions, Medium-Length: Claude Jutra, Comment savoir; Donald Brittain and John Spotton, Memorandum; Claude Fournier, On sait où entrer Tony, mais c'est les notes; Mort Ransen, No Reason to Stay
- Short Film: No award presented
- Short Film, Special Mentions: Donald Shebib, Revival; Jacques Kasma and Pierre Patry, Ghosts of a River (Trois hommes au mille carré)

=== 1967 ===
- Grand Prize, Feature: Jean Pierre Lefebvre, Don't Let It Kill You (Il ne faut pas mourir pour ça) and Allan King, Warrendale
- Grand Prize, Medium-Length: Jacques Leduc, Chantal en vrac
- Short Film: Pierre Hébert, Op Hop - Hop Op
- Special Jury Prize: Martin Duckworth and Jean Roy, Flight
- Special Mentions: Claude Jutra, Rouli-Roulant; Tanya Ballantyne, The Things I Cannot Change; Derek May, Angel; Michel Brault, Between Salt and Sweet Water (Entre la mer et l'eau douce)
