= 20th Canadian Film Awards =

Canadian film awards ceremony

- Date: October 4, 1968
- Location: Seaway Towers Hotel, Toronto, Ontario
- Hosted by: Bill Walker, Louise Marleau

Highlights
- Most awards: Isabel
- Film of the Year: A Place to Stand
- Best Feature Film: The Ernie Game

The 20th Canadian Film Awards were held on October 4, 1968 to honour achievements in Canadian film. The ceremony was hosted by broadcaster Bill Walker and actress Louise Marleau.

Just before the awards' 20th anniversary, its sponsors, the Canadian Association of Adult Education, the Canadian Foundation and the Canadian Film Institute, terminated their connection with the awards. Members of the Association of Motion Picture Producers and Laboratories in Canada, the Canadian Society of Cinematographers and the Directors Guild of Canada formed a group to organize a competition for 1968. This group was independently incorporated as the Canadian Film Awards; its executive was members of industry associations, guilds and unions. Not represented was the Quebec Association of Independent Filmmakers which declined due to its objection to competition among filmmakers.

The awards categories were restructured, and craft categories and new special awards were introduced. For the first time, awards were presented to actors and actresses; and it was the last year in which awards were presented for amateur films. A statue was commissioned from sculptor Sorel Etrog, public screenings were instituted, and the selection process was revamped, with nomination committees pre-selecting entries for consideration by a five-member international jury. For this year, 181 films were entered, and the committees nominated 50 for final consideration. But the jury ignored committee recommendations for Best Cinematography and Best Direction and made its own choices. As a result, the voting process was changed for 1969.

== Winners ==
=== Films ===
- Film of the Year: A Place to Stand - TDF Productions, Christopher Chapman and David MacKay producers, Christopher Chapman director
- Feature Film: The Ernie Game - National Film Board of Canada, Gordon Burwash producer, Don Owen director
- Film Under 30 Minutes: Ça n'est pas le temps des romans (This Is No Time for Romance) - National Film Board of Canada, Fernand Dansereau director
- Film Over 30 Minutes: Do Not Fold, Staple, Spindle or Mutilate - National Film Board of Canada, John Howe director
- Documentary Under 30 Minutes: Avec tambours et trompettes (With Drums and Trumpets) - National Film Board of Canada, Robert Forget producer, Marcel Carrière director
- Documentary Over 30 Minutes: Never a Backward Step - National Film Board of Canada, Guy Glover producer, Donald Brittain, Arthur Hammond and John Spotton directors
- Animated: Not awarded

Honorable Mention: A Child in His Country (Un enfant... Un pays) - National Film Board of Canada, Jacques Bobet producer, Pierre Moretti director

- Travel and Recreation: Countdown to a Gold Medal - Canadian Broadcasting Corporation, Denis Hargrave producer and director
- Public Relations: Carstairs, Tell the People - Crawley Films, F.R. Crawley and Seaton Findlay producers, Seaton Findlay director
- Sales Promotion: Driver Training: Life Is Worth the Living - Chetwynd Films - Arthur Chetwynd producer, Bill Street director
- Amateur: Il était une plume — Robert Lachapelle director

=== Technical development and innovation awards ===
- John D. Lowry and Canadian Westinghouse Company - "for the Wescam stabilized camera platform".
- Barry D. Gordon and Don Weed of Film Effects - "for dynamic frame and multi-image in A Place to Stand.
- Gerald Graham and the NFB's Technical Services Branch - "for In the Labyrinth".

Honourable Mention: Westminster Films - "for Expo 67 Bell Telephone production".

=== John Drainie Awards ===
- Esse Ljungh - Stage (series), CBC Radio
- W. O. Mitchell, author - Jake and The Kid, CBC Radio
- Tommy Tweed - actor, writer and historian
- Jean Murray - Winnipeg actress (posthumous)

=== Feature film craft awards ===
- Performance by a Lead Actor: Gerard Parkes - Isabel (Quest Film Productions)
- Performance by a Lead Actress: Geneviève Bujold - Isabel (Quest Film Productions)
- Black-and-White Cinematography: Bernard Gosselin - Le règne du jour (The Times That Are) (NFB)
- Colour Cinematography: Georges Dufaux - Isabel (Quest Film Productions)
- Direction: Don Owen - The Ernie Game (NFB)
- Film Editing: George Appleby - Isabel (Quest Film Productions)
- Overall Sound: Serge Beauchemin and Alain Dostie - Le règne du jour (The Times That Are) (NFB)

=== Non-feature craft awards ===
- Colour Cinematography: Denis Gillson - Waiting for Caroline (NFB)
- Sound Editing: Kenneth Heeley-Ray - A Place to Stand (TDF Productions)
- Music Score: Louis Applebaum - Athabasca
- Screenplay: Phillip Hersch - Wojeck: Swing Low Sweet Chariot (CBC)
- Non-Dramatic Script: Hugh Kemp, The Secret Years of El Dorado (CBC)
- Sound Recording: Ron Alexander and Roger Lamoureux, Do Not Fold, Staple, Spindle or Mutilate (NFB)

=== Special award ===
- Pas de deux - National Film Board of Canada, Norman McLaren "for outstanding artistic achievement".
