= Audio-Visual Preservation Trust of Canada =

Defunct non-profit organization

The Audio-Visual Preservation Trust of Canada (or the AV Trust). originally the Alliance for the Preservation of Canada's Audio-Visual Heritage, was a charitable non-profit organization dedicated to promoting the preservation of Canada's audiovisual heritage, and to facilitating access to regional and national collections through partnerships with members of Canada's audiovisual community.

In 2008, the Conservative government eliminated CA$300,000 in funding for the Trust, leading to its merger with the Academy of Canadian Cinema & Television in 2009–10.

== History ==
In 1994, a task force for the "Preservation and Enhanced Use of Canada’s Audiovisual Heritage," made up of archival expert across the country—including those from the then-National Archives of Canada—published a report in which they recommended, among other things, the founding of a "Consortium of stakeholders, as a charitable and non-profit corporation, should be established to co-ordinate the implementation of the national strategy, and to undertake projects and programs with respect to the preservation and enhanced use of the audio-visual heritage." Following the report, the Alliance for the Preservation of Canada's Audio-Visual Heritage was created in 1996 to create action plans, advocate, manage projects, administer funding, and develop standards for archivists and audiovisual producers.

In 2000, the Alliance, now renamed to the Audio-Visual Preservation Trust of Canada, introduced three of its key programs: MasterWorks, the Astral Restoration Program, and the Feature Film Education and Access Program (FFEAP). Two years after the first FFEAP projects were developed, the Trust introduced the Music Memories program through a new Sound Recording Policy initiative of the federal Department of Canadian Heritage. In 2001, Universal Studios Canada and Universal Music Canada made 5-year funding commitments to programs to support heritage feature films and the preservation of heritage sound recordings, including screenings of MasterWorks films and supporting archival institutions in their projects to restore and make available endangered sound recordings.

In 2008, Canadian Heritage ceased the AV Trust's two Education and Access Programs, the FFEAP, and Music Memories, removing CA$300,000 in funding for the Trust. In 2009–10, the AV Trust agreed to a merger with the Academy of Canadian Cinema & Television.

== Programs ==
In the past, the Astral Restoration Program, introduced in 2000, has worked with the Cinémathèque québécoise and the Toronto International Film Festival Group to restore and re-release films.

In 2008, the Program announced plans to create High-Definition digital versions of 12 classic films, including MasterWorks honorees Les Bons Débarras (1980) and Thirty Two Short Films About Glenn Gould (1993).

=== Feature Film Education and Access Program ===
The Feature Film Education and Access Program (FFEAP) was central to the preservation and restoration work of the AV Trust. Created and funded by the Feature Film Policy of the Department of Canadian Heritage in 2000, FFEAP provided funding to non-profit organizations across the country to support the protection of Canada's cinematical heritage, as well as to educate students, academics, and the general public about such films.

The program enabled the re-release of several movies, both on film and DVD, often with accompanying educational content for use in schools—such as the works of Larry Kent by the Mel Hoppenheim School of Cinema at Concordia University and the re-release of Life Classes (1987) by the Nova Scotia School of Art and Design. FFEAP also supported local film societies to put together screenings of locally produced films; as well funding various film festival events, such as screenings of Entre la mer et l’eau douce (1967) and The Grey Fox (1982) at the Toronto International Film Festival, and the multimedia celebration of In the Land of the Head Hunters (1914) at U'mista Cultural Centre.

=== Masterworks ===
Education and access programs included the MasterWorks program, founded in 2000. The MasterWorks program provided funding to support preservation of selected works and enhanced access to works no longer in active distribution.

The program recognized 12 culturally-significant audiovisual works each year, drawn from the archives of the Canadian film, radio, television, and music industries, and accordingly presented in four categories: Film, Television, Radio, and Sound Recording MasterWorks. These works were then judged by a panel of experts in the archive and media communities as being "worthy of preserving for all time." Works were chosen because of their critical and popular success, or because they were seminal in their genre.

The very last MasterWorks ceremony was held on 27 April 2009 at Library and Archives Canada in Ottawa, and was organized by the Canadian Film Institute.

MasterWorks, by category and year
Film MasterWorks
2000	Goin' Down the Road	Mon oncle Antoine	Neighbours
2001	La vraie nature de Bernadette	The Loon's Necklace	The Grey Fox
2002	The Apprenticeship of Duddy Kravitz	The Cat in the Bag (Le Chat dans le sac)	Warrendale
2004	The Street	Nobody Waved Goodbye	The Decline of the American Empire
2005	The Rowdyman	Begone Dull Care	J.A. Martin Photographer
2006	Wavelength	Good Riddance (Les Bons débarras)	Isabel
2007	Life Classes	Mindscape (Le paysagiste)	The Dog Who Stopped the War
2009	Lonely Boy	Orders (Les Ordres)	Thirty Two Short Films About Glenn Gould
Radio MasterWorks
2000	Rawhide (CBC, 1946–62)	"Mr Arcularis," Stage 49 (CBC, 1948)	Le disparu (Radio-Canada, 1971–74)
2001	The 1927 Diamond Jubilee Broadcast (CNRO)	L’heure provinciale (CKAC, 1929–39)	Glenn Gould’s Solitude Trilogy (CBC, 1967–77)
2002	Farm Radio Dramas (CBC, 1939–68)	WWII broadcasts of Matthew Halton and Marcel Ouimet (CBC, 1943–46)	Hilda Morgan (CBC, 1950)
2004	"Aspects of the Canadian Novel," Anthology (CBC, 1972)	Radio-Bigoudi (CBC, 1955–57)	La Cloison (Radio-Canada, 1971)
2005	Radio broadcasts of Marius Barbeau, featuring ethnological recordings (CNRO & CBC, 1932–66)	As It Happens with Barbara Frum (CBC, 1971–81)	Dobbin’s Den (CKUT-FM, 1995–2009)
2006	Moose River Gold Mines disaster reported by Frank Willis (CRBC, 1936)	Fidéles aux postes (Radio-Canada, 2003)	Harry “Red” Foster's body of work
2007	Don Messer and His Islanders (CBC, 1929–58)	Le Festival de l’humour québécois (CKAC, 1971–89)	Allan Waters' body of work
2009	Interview of Steven Truscott by Brian Thomas (CHUM-FM, 1975)	Souverains anonyms (CHAA-FM, 1989–)	John Drainie's body of work
Television MasterWorks
2000	La Famille Plouffe (Société Radio-Canada, 1953)	"Rinse the Blood Off My Toga," The Wayne and Shuster Hour (CBC, 1954)	The Mills of the Gods: Viet Nam (CBC, 1965)
2001	Cré-Basile! (Télé-Metropole, 1965–70)	Femme d’aujourd’hui (Radio-Canada, 1965–82)	SCTV (Global & CBC, 1978–84)
2002	La Côte de Cable (Radio-Canada, 1960–62)	This Hour Has Seven Days (CBC, 1964–66)	Wojeck (CBC, 1966–69)
2004	Point de mire (Radio-Canada, 1956–59)	The Beachcombers (CBC, 1972–90)	Canada-USSR Summit Series, 8th Game (CBC, 1972)
2005	The Friendly Giant (CBC, 1958–84)	Les Beaux Dimanches (Télévision de Radio-Canada, 1966–2004)	Anne of Green Gables (CBC, 1985)
2006	The Pig and Whistle (CTV, 1967–77)	Duplessis (CBC, 1978)	The Champions (CBC, 1978, 1986)
2007	Don Messer's Jubilee (CBC, 1959–69)	Mr. Dressup (CBC, 1967–96)	Les Filles de Caleb (Radio-Canada, 1990)
2009	Flight into Danger (CBC, 1956)	La Boîte à surprises (Radio-Canada, 1956–72)	Vietnam: The Ten Thousand Day War (CBC, 1980–82)
Sound Recording Masterworks
2000	Bach: Goldberg Variations (Glenn Gould, 1955)	The Trio (Oscar Peterson Trio, 1961)	Gilles Vigneault: La Collection Émergence (1962–1969; compiled 1995)
2001	Raoul Jobin fonds (National Library of Canada, 1926–1968)	Lindberg (Robert Charlebois and Louise Forestier, 1968)	Canadian Railroad Trilogy (Gordon Lightfoot, 1975 re-recording)
2002	L’intégrale (The Complete Recordings) (Mary Travers-Bolduc, 1929–39; compiled 1993)	“Swinging Shepherd Blues” (Moe Koffman, 1957)	Wilfrid Pelletier: Tribute, 100th anniversary: 1896-1996 (compiled 1996)
2004	“When You and I Were Young, Maggie” (Henry Burr, 1909)	Mahler Symphony No. 2 (Maureen Forrester, contralto, 1958)	Starmania (1978)
2005	“The West, a Nest and You, Dear” (Mart Kenney and His Western Gentlemen, 1938)	Jaune (Jean-Pierre Ferland, 1970)	Lulu (Teresa Stratas, soprano, 1979)
2006	Opera Recitals and Lieder (Léopold Simoneau and Pierrette Alarie, 1950s; compiled 2004)	Paul Bley’s body of work (1952–2006)	2112 (Rush, 1976)
2007	Songs of Leonard Cohen (Leonard Cohen, 1967)	Guitar Sounds from Lenny Breau (Lenny Breau, 1968)	Daphnis et Chloé (Montreal Symphony Orchestra, 1981)
2009	——	——	——

=== Music Memories ===
In 2002, the Trust introduced the Music Memories program through a Sound Recording Policy initiative of the Department of Canadian Heritage.

The Program supported non-profit organizations in digitizing recordings from outmoded media, creating educational content, and re-issuing out-of-print music. In particular, the program: assisted universities, such as Université Laval and Memorial University, and museums in digitizing ethnological recordings of interviews, music, and stories to ease access for researchers; funded the acquisition of new equipment for digitization/accessibility programs for the Canada Music Fund and for the transfer of collections to new formats for public distribution; provided, through organisations like Carleton University (Gala Records) and ProgresSon, for the re-release of previously hard-to-find or completely-unavailable music, such as older recordings and the music of rock bands Maneige and Beau Dommage.

== Partners ==
AV Trust partners included:

- Aboriginal Peoples Television Network
- Academy of Canadian Cinema & Television
- Astral Media
- Bureau of Canadian Archivists
- Canadian Film Institute
- Canadian Screen Training Centre
- Cinémathèque québécoise
- Department of Canadian Heritage, including:
  - Canadian Broadcasting Corporation
  - Library and Archives Canada
  - National Film Board of Canada
  - Telefilm Canada
- National Screen Institute
- Pacific Cinémathèque
- Ontario Trillium Foundation
- Toronto International Film Festival
- Universal Studios/Universal Music Canada.
