= The Merry World of Leopold Z =

1965 film by Gilles Carle

- French: La vie heureuse de Léopold Z
- Directed by: Gilles Carle
- Written by: Gilles Carle
- Produced by: Jacques Bobet
- Starring: Guy L'Écuyer; Paul Hébert; Monique Joly; Suzanne Valéry; Jacques Poulin; Albert Millaire
- Cinematography: Jean-Claude Labrecque
- Edited by: Werner Nold
- Music by: Paul de Margerie
- Production company: National Film Board of Canada
- Release date: August 1965 (Montreal)
- Running time: 68 minutes
- Country: Canada
- Language: French

The Merry World of Léopold Z (French: La vie heureuse de Léopold Z) is a 1965 Canadian Christmas comedy-drama film written and directed by Gilles Carle, in his feature directorial debut. It follows the misadventures of its titular character (Guy L'Écuyer), a snow plow operator for the City of Montreal, on Christmas Eve.

Produced by the National Film Board of Canada and heavily influenced by the Direct Cinema and French New Wave movements, the film played a key role in efforts to create a popular national cinema in Quebec.

== Plot ==
Léopold Z. Tremblay is an easygoing a snow plow operator in Montreal. On Christmas Eve, as a record snowstorm hits the city, Léopold struggles to finish his shift in time to make Midnight Mass. As he juggles his work obligations with those of his family, several references to contemporary events foreshadow the major changes that Quebec society was about to experience.

== Cast ==
- Guy L'Écuyer as Leopold Z. Tremblay
- Paul Hébert as Théophile Lemay
- Suzanne Valéry as Josita
- Monique Joly as Catherine Tremblay
- Jacques Poulin as Jacques Tremblay
- Gilles Latulippe as Bank employee
- Bernard Assiniwi as Bernard Lapierre
- André Gagnon as Dédé
- Albert Millaire as the narrator (voice)

== Themes ==
The film paints a portrait of a hapless Québécois little man, battling the winter elements as well as the demands of consumerism, sexual desire and the requirement at that time for French-speaking Quebecers to speak English to be successful.

As with other Quebec NFB films of the period, the film incorporates Direct Cinema techniques. It is also a film with a strong political point of view, with Carle intending his central character to be a "pre-revolutionary" figure, representing how the Québécois people were being exploited by a capitalist, English-speaking power structure.

== Production ==
The film incorporates documentary film footage of snow clearing in Montreal, and in fact, had been originally commissioned by the National Film Board of Canada as a documentary on snow clearing, only to be turned into a fictional film by the director.

Ironically, while the film portrays a plow operator battling a traditional Montreal snow storm, an almost snowless winter meant that Carle had to film sporadically over 18 months.

== Reception ==
The film won first prize in the feature films category at the Festival of Canadian Films, held as part of the 1965 Montreal International Film Festival.
