= Kensington Market (band) =

Musical group

- Origin: Toronto, Ontario, Canada
- Genre: Pop rock
- Years active: 1967–1969
- Labels: Warner Bros., Stone Records
- Members: Alex Darou; Jimmy Watson; Gene Martynec; Keith McKie; Luke Gibson; John Mills-Cockell

Kensington Market, also known as The Market, was a Toronto-based rock band, active from 1967 to 1969. Named after a downtown Toronto neighbourhood, it was known for "gentle, lyrical, rock music", masterful musicianship, and for being one of the first Canadian rock bands to develop a style independent of US and British models.

== History ==
The band was formed by singer/songwriter and guitarist Keith McKie, former Bobby Kris & The Imperials guitarist and pianist Gene Martynec, bass player Alex Darou, drummer Jimmy Watson and former Luke & The Apostles frontman, singer/songwriter Luke Gibson. McKie and Darou were from Sault Ste. Marie, Ontario where, along with Bob Yukich and Alfred Johns, they had band The Vendettas, which had opened for The Everly Brothers, The Dave Clark Five, and The Searchers.

In 1965, The Vendettas moved to Toronto and were invited to audition for Ronnie Hawkins. Nothing materialized from that and Darou left to play with David Clayton-Thomas, but they were able to play gigs at bars and coffeehouses and caught the attention of musical entrepreneur Bernie Finkelstein. Finkelstein (who would eventually found True North Records) had just sold his interest in The Paupers and was looking for new bands. He offered to help them form a new band, bringing in Martynec and Watson, and Darou returned. The band launched at the Night Owl on Toronto's Avenue Road on 4 June 1967. Writing in the Toronto Star, Sid Adilman reported that the group was "the brightest and most inventive band ever grouped together in Toronto".

In 1967, for Stone Records, Kensington Market released four singles: "Bobby's Birthday", "I Would be the One", "Mr. John", and "Kensington Market". "Mr. John" peaked at #76 on RPM's Canadian Top 100 chart in September 1967.

The Market also landed the contract to do the soundtrack to the 1967 Don Owen film The Ernie Game (the soundtrack included on additional song, "Stranger" by Leonard Cohen). They performed at the 1967 Mariposa Folk Festival, where they were one of the bands to inaugurate electronic instruments at the festival. They appeared in the centerfold of Maclean's magazine, and they were invited to play in a jam session with former Gordon Lightfoot guitarist David Rea. Rea was so impressed, he called American producer Felix Pappalardi (Cream, The Youngbloods), who flew up and offered the band a two-record deal with Warner Bros., appearing at the Ottawa club they were playing at, contract in hand. The band flew to New York, played several shows at The Bitter End, recorded their debut album and went back to Canada to play more gigs, including opening for Jefferson Airplane at McMaster University.

== Avenue Road ==
In 1968, Warner Bros. re-released "I Would be the One" and a new single, "Speaking of Dreams". Both songs would appear on their debut album, Avenue Road, which was released at the Warner Bros. annual convention in Honolulu. The album garnered rave reviews. Australian music journalist Ritchie Yorke, writing for The Globe and Mail, called it "probably the finest album ever cut by a Canadian group". The album reached number 39 on the RPM charts.

In August 1968, the band began a US tour and "I Would Be The One" reached #59 on the national RPM chart. The tour included a show at San Francisco's Fillmore West, with Chuck Berry and the Steve Miller Band. For Kensington Market, the concert was a disaster, with McKie saying that they played like amateurs. The incident so demoralized the band that they never recovered. Drugs were now involved. In addition, the expected sales of Avenue Road did not materialize. Warner Bros, having reportedly taken issue with the cover (a picture of the band grouped in the snow), did little to promote it.

== Aardvark ==
In the winter of 1968, Kensington Market began recording its second album, now with the addition of keyboardist John Mills-Cockell. Their second album, Aardvark, again produced by Pappalardi, was released in 1969; Warner Brothers issued the singles "Witches Stone" and "Help Me". But the band had lost its creative direction. Finkelstein dropped them and, by the spring of 1969, they had broken up.

== Post break-up ==
Alex Darou, according to the band's lawyer, became a recluse and starved himself to death in the early 1970s. Watson retired from the world of music. Mills-Cockell formed the band Syrinx. Martynec went on with a successful solo career, playing with Lou Reed and winning the Juno Award for Producer of the Year in 1981 for Bruce Cockburn's "Tokyo" and Rough Trade's "High School Confidential". Gibson made the 1972 LP Another Perfect Day and McKie, who became a boat-builder, released Rumours at the Newsstand in 1981.

== Discography ==
=== Studio albums ===
- Avenue Road, 1968, Warner Bros. (Re-issued CD 2008, Pacemaker Entertainment)
- Aardvark, 1969, Warner Bros.(Re-issued CD 2008, Pacemaker Entertainment)

=== Singles ===
- "Bobby's Birthday", 1967, Stone Records
- "I Would be the One", 1967, Stone Records
- "Mr. John", 1967, Stone Records
- "Kensington Market", 1967, Stone Records
- "Speaking of Dreams", 1968, Warner Bros.
- "Witches Stone", 1969, Warner Bros.
- "Help Me", 1969, Warner Bros.

=== Film Score ===
The Ernie Game, 1967, National Film Board of Canada

== Sources ==
- "The Market: In Town", by Peter Goddard, Toronto Telegram's After Four section, October 12, 1968, page 7
