= A Cool Sound from Hell =

1959 film

- Directed by: Sidney J. Furie
- Written by: Sidney J. Furie
- Produced by: Sidney J. Furie
- Starring: Anthony Ray; Alan Crofoot
- Cinematography: Herbert S. Alpert
- Edited by: David Nicholson
- Music by: Phil Nimmons
- Production company: Caribou Productions
- Release date: 1959 (UK)
- Running time: 71 minutes
- Country: Canada
- Language: English
- Budget: $85,000

A Cool Sound from Hell is a 1959 Canadian crime drama film written, produced and directed by Sidney J. Furie and starring Anthony Ray.

== Plot summary ==
A young man becomes disillusioned with the beatnik crowd he hangs with when they become involved with drugs.

== Cast ==
- Anthony Ray as Charlie
- Alan Crofoot as Milt
- Mel Benstock as Leo
- George Carron as Jerry
- Madeline Kronby as Debbie
- Albert D'Annibale as Tenor Sax Man
- Walter Massey as Pilot
- Gurston I. Rosenfeld as Doc
- Don Owen as Poet (uncredited)

== Production ==
The film was shot entirely in Toronto. This film was the first job of the director Don Owen; Furie hired him as his assistant director.

The soundtrack was provided by jazz great Phil Nimmons.

== Release ==
For various reasons, A Cool Sound from Hell was released theatrically only in England, and never screened in North America. Furie sold the UK rights for £60,000 and the film made a profit. The film was later thought to have been lost, but was eventually located in the British Film Institute archives and finally had its North American premiere at the 2016 Toronto International Film Festival.

Shortly after making this film, Furie left for England where his career took off in 1961 with The Young Ones, starring Cliff Richard.
