= Forever Quebec =

2008 Canadian film directed by Jean-Claude Labrecque

- French: Infiniment Québec
- Directed by: Jean-Claude Labrecque
- Written by: Jean-Claude Labrecque; Francine Laurendeau
- Produced by: Yves Fortin; Christian Medawar
- Narrated by: Gilbert Sicotte
- Cinematography: Jean-Claude Labrecque
- Edited by: Yves Chaput
- Music by: Jorane
- Production company: Productions Thalie
- Distributed by: National Film Board of Canada
- Release date: 2008
- Running time: 52 minutes
- Country: Canada
- Language: French

Forever Quebec (French: Infiniment Québec) is a Canadian documentary film, directed by Jean-Claude Labrecque and released in 2008. The film is a portrait of life in Quebec City, made as part of the city's 400th anniversary celebrations that year.

The film had originally been planned for 75 minutes in length and commercial distribution, but Labrecque had to revise his plans following the financial difficulties facing Christal Films. It received a theatrical screening at the city's Agora du Vieux-Port as part of the National Film Board of Canada's free screening series of documentary films about the city on July 2 and 3, but was otherwise distributed primarily through television broadcast on Télévision de Radio-Canada and ARTV.

The film received a Genie Award nomination for Best Documentary at the 29th Genie Awards in 2009.
