= 60 Cycles =

- Directed by: Jean-Claude Labrecque
- Produced by: Jacques Bobet
- Cinematography: Bernard Gosselin; Jean-Claude Labrecque; Jacques Leduc
- Edited by: Werner Nold
- Music by: Don Douglas; Gordon Fleming; Tony Romandini
- Distributed by: National Film Board of Canada
- Release date: 1965
- Running time: 16 minutes
- Country: Canada
- Language: French

60 Cycles is a 1965 Canadian short from the National Film Board of Canada directed and photographed by Jean-Claude Labrecque.

== Synopsis ==
60 Cycles is a film about the 11th St-Laurent long-distance bicycle race covering 2,400 kilometres of Gaspé countryside in 12 days. With the curving, picturesque landscape as backdrop, you see here an event where the challenge seems more personal than competitive. 60 Cycles was the first to use a 1,000-mm lens in an opening shot that remains famous: a group of cyclists is shown riding towards the camera with the impression that they are not even moving due to the long focal length of the lens.

In 1966, Labrecque told Take One magazine, "I found I could go further in experimenting with the effects of various lenses on heat. For example, we found out how heat waves can be seen coming off the road on a hot day. We first noticed the effect approaching the camera way in the distance. With everything telescoped, it produced a unique effect. Notice how, on the right of the line of cyclists (they were on a straight road seven miles long), the telephone poles seem to be a narrow fence. In reality, there is a 180 feet between each pole.

"We used Eastmancolor and had three telephoto lenses (1,000, 600 and 300 mm) on Arriflex cameras with an Angenieux zoom 25–250. We had two operators, two assistants, one racing car driver and one business manager. In the end, we only used the sequence shot with the 1,000-mm lens. This was done so as not to break the rhythm, since the three sequences gave different speeds to the racers and varied the rhythm of the 'heat waves', which are so noticeable in the film."

== Influence ==
George Lucas has stated that he was influenced by 60 Cycles when he directed his 1966 student film 1:42.08.

== Awards ==
- 18th Canadian Film Awards – Best Colour Cinematography
- 19th British Academy Film Awards: Nominee: BAFTA Award for Best Short Film
