= Never a Backward Step =

- Directed by: Donald Brittain; Arthur Hammond; John Spotton
- Produced by: Guy Glover
- Starring: Roy Thomson
- Narrated by: Michael Kane
- Cinematography: Martin Duckworth; Peter Hennessy; Paul Leach
- Edited by: John Knight (music and sound)
- Production company: National Film Board of Canada
- Release date: 1966
- Running time: 57 minutes
- Country: Canada
- Language: English

Never a Backward Step is a 1966 documentary film, produced by the National Film Board of Canada and directed by Donald Brittain, Arthur Hammond and John Spotton.

It is a profile of Canadian press magnate Roy Thomson, whose single-minded attention to business brought him riches, power, and a baronetcy. A native of Timmins, Ontario, Thomson had a tremendous career as publisher, television magnate, financier, and owner of 200+ newspapers in Canada, the U.S. and the U.K., including The Times. It was Thomson who coined the phrase "a permit to print money" (now normally heard as "license to print money") after he'd purchased Scottish Television.

The filmmakers followed Thomson for a few days and captured the many sides of this very ordinary Canadian who, by dint of hard work and luck, became one of the most powerful men in the world.

== Awards ==
- American Film and Video Festival, New York: Blue Ribbon, First Prize, Biography & History, 1968
- 20th Canadian Film Awards, Toronto: Best Documentary Over 30 Minutes, 1968
