= Arthur Hammond (director) =

Canadian documentary filmmaker (1930–2023)

Arthur Henry Percival Hammond (1930 – March 28, 2023) was a Canadian documentary filmmaker, associated with the National Film Board of Canada. He was most noted as codirector with Donald Brittain and John Spotton of Never a Backward Step, which won the Canadian Film Award for Best Feature Length Documentary at the 20th Canadian Film Awards in 1968, and for his 1968 film This Land, for which he was a Canadian Film Award nominee for Best Director at the 21st Canadian Film Awards in 1969.

Hammond was also the writer and director of Corporation, a six-part documentary series aired by CBC Television in 1975, and of Imperfect Union, a four-part NFB series on Canadian labour history.

Hammond died on March 28, 2023.
