= Pierre F. Brault =

French Canadian composer (1939–2014)

Pierre Florent Brault
- Born: August 3, 1939; Montreal, Quebec
- Died: January 14, 2014 (aged 74); Sherbrooke, Quebec
- Occupation: Composer

Pierre Florent Brault (August 3, 1939 – January 14, 2014) was a Quebec film and television composer, who is best known for creating theme music and songs for the popular children's TV series Passe-Partout. He wrote music for many films created by the National Film Board of Canada (NFB) and worked with directors Gilles Carle and Claude Jutra.

== Early life ==
Brault was born in Montreal. He learned to play the accordion, and lived in Chicoutimi until age 18.

== Career ==
Brault began playing the accordion professionally in Montreal in 1961. Later in the 1960s he composed music for the theatrical group Les Apprentis Sorciers, and created music and arrangements for Clémence Desrochers.

Brault began his film scoring career with Jutra's 1965 skateboarding film Rouli-roulant. He went on to compose soundtracks for many films at the NFB, developing his skill as a composer and songwriter. His film scores included the films A Child in His Country (Un enfant...un pays), Stop, Red, The Time of the Hunt (Le Temps d'une chasse) and Panic (Panique).

Brault composed music for the children's television show Passe-Partout. In 1985, an album of songs for the show, Le Noël de Cannelle et Pruneau, was released. The album was remixed and re-released in 2013.

Brault died in Sherbrooke, Quebec, in 2014.

In 2019, an album with cover versions of Brault's music, Coucou Passe-Partout, was recorded.
