= With Drums and Trumpets =

1967 Canadian documentary film

- French: Avec tambours et trompettes
- Directed by: Marcel Carrière
- Produced by: Robert Forget
- Cinematography: Alain Dostie; Bernard Gosselin
- Edited by: Werner Nold
- Music by: Donald Douglas
- Production company: National Film Board of Canada
- Release date: 1967
- Running time: 27:33 minutes
- Country: Canada
- Language: French with English subtitles

With Drums and Trumpets (French: Avec tambours et trompettes) is a 1967 Canadian documentary film, directed by Marcel Carrière for the National Film Board of Canada.

The film depicts a group of men in Coaticook, Quebec who are performing the roles of the Papal Zouaves in a historical reenactment of the Capture of Rome during the Italian Risorgimento.

In 1867, Pope Pius IX called for volunteers to defend the Papacy against the troops of King Victor-Emmanuel, and Québec sent a contingent of 503 men to join the Papal Zouaves. Filmed at a centenary celebration of this event, the film is a humorous but sympathetic portrait of this elite group.

The film won the Canadian Film Award for Best Documentary Under 30 Minutes at the 20th Canadian Film Awards in 1968.
