= Corporation (TV series) =

Canadian documentary television series

- Genre: Documentary
- Written by: Arthur Hammond
- Directed by: Arthur Hammond
- Country of origin: Canada
- Original language: English
- No. of seasons: 1
- No. of episodes: 6

Production
- Executive producer: George Pearson
- Producer: Arthur Hammond
- Cinematography: Jean-Pierre Lachapelle
- Editor: Pierre Lasry
- Running time: 30 minutes

Original release
- Network: CBC Television
- Release: 16 February – 6 April 1975

Corporation is a Canadian business documentary television series that aired on CBC Television in 1975. It offered a rare behind-the-scenes look at the internal workings of the Steinberg supermarket chain's business operations and departments. Most of the footage was filmed in 1969, and released in the early 1970s.

== Premise ==
This series broadcast all but one of the National Film Board of Canada documentary films on the Steinberg grocery company, documenting the business life of the company. The films received co-operation and involvement from company leader Sam Steinberg. One of the documentaries, "After Mr. Sam", ran almost 78 minutes long and was not broadcast on CBC during this run. All of the films have been digitized and made available for public viewing on the NFB's website.

== Scheduling ==
This half-hour series was broadcast most Sundays at 2:00 p.m. (Eastern) from 16 February to 6 April 1975.

== Episodes ==
1. "Growth" describes the past and future development of the company
2. "Real Estate" concerns the company's land holdings and their effect on residential patterns
3. "International Operations" featured the results of Steinberg opening a store in Paris
4. "The Market" documented the company's approach to managing its relationships with customers, competitors and suppliers
5. "Motivation" documented the company's relationships with its workers
6. "Bilingualism" documented the company's relationships with Quebec

Not broadcast:

- "After Mr. Sam" documented discussions surround the future succession of the Steinberg empire and corporate makeup when founder Sam Steinberg steps back from running the company.
