= Tony Romandini =

Canadian musical artist (1928–2020)

- Born: Giuseppe Alexander Antonio Romandini; 27 July 1928
- Origin: Montreal, Quebec, Canada
- Died: June 3, 2020 (aged 91)
- Genres: Jazz
- Occupations: Composer, guitarist
- Instrument: Guitar
- Years active: 1945–2020
- Label: RCA Gala

Tony (Giuseppe Alexander Antonio) Romandini (27 July 1928 - June 3, 2020) was a Canadian jazz guitarist, composer, arranger, and teacher.

He was born in Montreal, Quebec to Italian immigrants. He started playing guitar at the age of 8, and by 20 years old he was working at the CBC as a session guitarist. In the 1950s he would play heavily in the Montreal Jazz circuit with other well-known musicians including pianists Paul de Margerie, Roland Lavallée and Maury Kaye.

Tony went on to become a first-call jazz session player, playing with jazz legends including Oscar Peterson, Dizzy Gillespie, Charlie Parker, and many others. Later in his career, Romandini performed in Manuel de Falla's La Vida Breve with the Montreal Symphony Orchestra, as well as the Quebec Symphony Orchestra, before finally settling down into teaching at Concordia University (1974–77) and later McGill University (1979–2000). He continued to give guitar lessons at Vanier College in Montreal.

He played a 1949 Epiphone Emperor.

== Discography ==
- 1962 Tony Romandini Evans Music Corp EMC-LP-33-0644
- 1964 Bella Musica Tony Romandini RCA Gala CGPS-141
- 1965 Guitare de danse/Dance to the Guitar RCA Gala CGPS-197/RCA Camden CAS-936
- 1965 Tony Romandini guitarist, banjo player, composer and six sensational sidemen CTL M-1063
- 1966 The Tony Romandini Quintet CBC LM-19
- 1975 TR guitar CBC LM-407
