= Pierre Patry =

Canadian film director and screenwriter

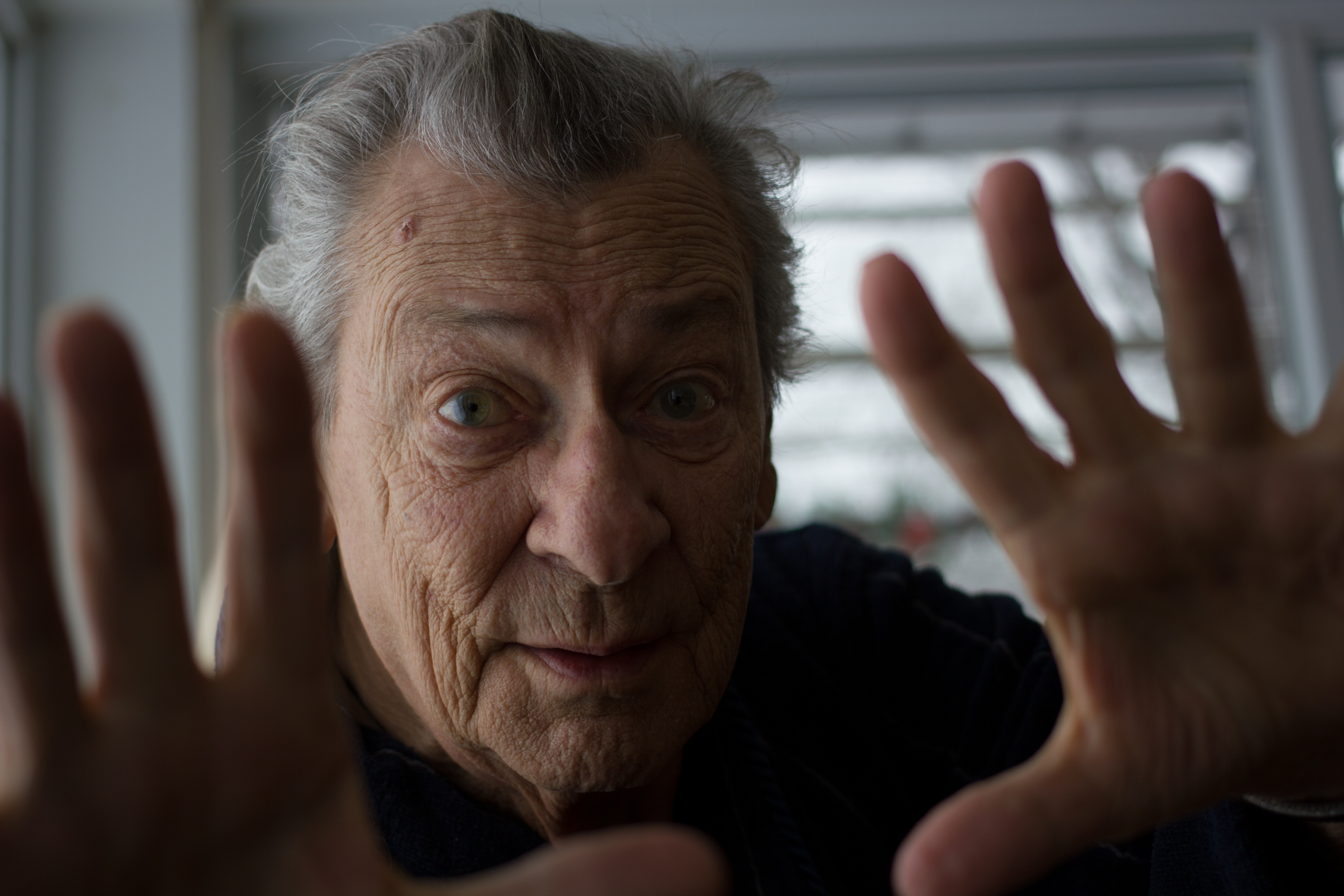
- Pierre Patry in his home at Vaudreuil-sur-le-Lac, Quebec. Winter 2012
- Born: November 2, 1933; Hull, Quebec, Canada
- Died: June 7, 2014 (aged 80)
- Occupations: Film director, Film producer, screenwriter
- Years active: 1950s-1980s

Pierre Patry (November 2, 1933 – June 7, 2014) was a Canadian film director and screenwriter.

== Biography ==
Born in Hull, Quebec, Patry began his career in the theatre as an actor and a playwright. He was a founding member of the Canadian Association of Amateur Theatre. He joined the National Film Board of Canada in 1957 as a writer on the Panoramique series. Patry was a major force in the beginning of the Quebec feature-film industry in the sixties. He directed three features, most notably Trouble-Maker (Trouble fête) in 1964.

He left the NFB in 1963 to co-found the film cooperative Coopératio with Roger Blais and Jean-Claude Lord. However, the company shut down after five years because of systemic problems in the financing and distribution of feature films.

In 1981 he was a major player in the development of the French language educational television station Canal Savoir.

Patri died on June 7, 2014.

== Filmography ==
=== As director ===
==== Fiction ====
- Louis-Hippolyte Lafontaine - 1962, short
- Françoise (Il y eut un soir... il y eut un matin) - 1964, short (re-released as part of the 1964 anthology film Trois Femmes)
- Trouble-Maker (Trouble fête) - 1964
- Caïn (Les Marcheurs de la nuit) - 1965
- Rope Around the Neck (La corde au cou) - 1965

==== Documentaries ====
- Eye Witness No. 99 (Documentary series Co-Directed with Hector Lemieux and Jacques Bobet, 1958) (Segment La roulotte)
- Germaine Guèvremont romancière (Short film, 1959)
- Les petites soeurs (Short film, 1959)
- Le chanoine Lionel Groulx, historien (Short film, 1960)
- Collèges contemporain (Short film, 1961)
- Croisements et profits (Short film Co-Directed with Clément Perron, 1961)
- Loisirs (Short film Co-Directed with Clément Perron, 1962)
- Petit discours de la méthode (Short film Co-Directed with Claude Jutra, 1963)
- Ghosts of a River (Trois hommes au mille carré) 1966 (Short film Co-Directed with Jacques Kasma, 1966)
- Shapp for Governor (Short film Co-Directed with Morten Parker, 1966)
- Infirmière de nuit (Short film, 1966)

=== As writer ===
- The Little Sisters (Les petites soeurs) - 1959
- Germaine Guèvremont, romancière - 1959
- Collège contemporain - 1960
- Le grand duc - 1959–1963
- Le chanoine Lionel Groulx, historien - 1960
- Louis-Hippolyte Lafontaine - 1962
- Ti-Jean caribou - 1963–1966
- Trouble-Maker (Trouble fête) - 1964
- Rope Around the Neck (La corde au cou) - 1965

=== As producer ===
- Françoise (Il y eut un soir... il y eut un matin) - 1964
- Trouble-Maker (Trouble fête) - 1964
- Rope Around the Neck (La corde au cou) - 1964
- Caïn (Les Marcheurs du matin) - 1965
- Deliver Us from Evil (Délivrez-nous du mal) (1966)
- Dust from Underground (Poussière sur la ville) - 1968
- Between Salt and Sweet Water (Entre la mer et l'eau douce) - 1968
- A Great Big Thing - 1968
- The Doves (Les Colombes) - 1972
