= Op Hop - Hop Op =

- Directed by: Pierre Hébert
- Animation by: Pierre Hébert
- Production company: National Film Board of Canada
- Release date: 1966
- Running time: 4 minutes
- Country: Canada

Op Hop - Hop Op is a Canadian animated short film, directed by Pierre Hébert and released in 1966. One of the first experiments in using computers in the production of animation, it is a scratch film comprising non-representative geometric shapes that flicker and rapidly change.

The film won the award for Best Short Film at the 1967 Montreal International Film Festival, although the announcement was controversial as the film had been booed by members of the audience at its screening.
