= Waiting for Caroline =

- Directed by: Ron Kelly
- Written by: George C. Robertson; Ron Kelly
- Produced by: Walford Hewitson
- Starring: Alexandra Stewart; François Tassé; William Needles
- Cinematography: Denis Gillson
- Edited by: Barrie Howells
- Music by: Eldon Rathburn; The Jaybees
- Production company: National Film Board of Canada
- Release date: 29 November 1967
- Running time: 84 minutes
- Country: Canada
- Language: English
- Budget: $516,000

Waiting for Caroline is a 1967 Canadian drama film directed by Ron Kelly and starring Alexandra Stewart, François Tassé, and William Needles. It was produced by the National Film Board of Canada and the Canadian Broadcasting Corporation, as their first-ever joint production.

The film was first released on the CBC Television anthology series Festival on 29 November 1967, after which, it was released for theater distribution.

The film was a Canadian Film Award nominee for Best Feature Film at the 20th Canadian Film Awards in 1968.

== Premise ==
Caroline (Alexandra Stewart) is torn between two cultures, the English-speaking community of Vancouver where she grew up and the French-speaking Québec where she is currently living. Her uncertainty extends to her lovers, Peter (Robert Howay) from Vancouver who wants to take her home and Marc (François Tassé) from Québec who would like to continue their pleasant, if inconclusive affair.

== Cast ==
- Alexandra Stewart - Caroline
- François Tassé - Marc
- William Needles - Stephen
- Aileen Seaton - Lally
- Monique Mercure - Yvette
- Paul Guèvremont - M. Simard
- Daniel Gadouas - Jean-Pierre
- Sharon Acker - Emily
- Robert Howay - Peter
- Lucie Poitras - Mme. Simard

== Production ==
Waiting for Caroline was filmed with a budget of $516,000 (equivalent to $4,681,061 in 2025), after going $200,000 overbudget.

== Reception ==
Senator Edgar Fournier opposed Waiting for Caroline and The Ernie Game for being indecent and both going overbudget.

== Works cited ==
- Evans, Gary (1991). In the National Interest: A Chronicle of the National Film Board of Canada from 1949 to 1989. University of Toronto Press. ISBN 0802027849.
