= Mariecke van der Linden =

- Born: 22 August 1973; Ravenstein, North Brabant, The Netherlands
- Education: Utrechts Conservatorium, Utrecht, The Netherlands
- Known for: Painting, drawing, sculpture, film, music

Mariecke van der Linden (Ravenstein, 1973) is a Dutch visual artist and opera composer. She works on music videos as an art director in the field of set design, costumes and styling. Furthermore she makes oil paintings and installations. Van der Linden is known for her portraits of prominent Dutch people such as Eberhard van der Laan, Johan Cruijff en Wubbo Ockels.

== Early life and education ==
Van der Linden was born in 1973 in Ravenstein. She grew up in Overlangel, a village consisting of 300 inhabitants which lies at the riverbank of Oude Maas. At the age of 14, she started to receive artistic coaching from Børge Ring, a Danish musician, artist and Oscar winner from the animation movie Anna en Bella. When she was 17, Van der Linden was accepted to the preliminary program of the Utrechts Conservatorium in Utrecht. Her formal education began in 1991 at the Royal Conservatory of The Hague with Theo Loevendie where she studied composition

== Career as a visual artist ==
Her name became more established at the opening of a side wing in the H'ART Museum when her life-sized portraits of notable Amsterdam citizens were revealed. This was accompanied by the mayor of Amsterdam, Eberhard van der Laan, revealing his own portrait. The work is now part of the permanent section "De Nieuwe Schuttersgalerij" of the museum.

In cooperation with Museum de Fundatie en Yuri Honing Van der Linden published the art- and storybook Goldbrun, a chapel for Europe with publisher Waanders. The book is on the shared gallery of Van der Linden and Honing Goldbrun and is the basis for their exposition sharing that name. The duo also created Bluebeard and Avalon, two expositions for the Castle of Nijenhuis about art installations and imagination.
