= A Child in His Country =

- French: Un enfant...un pays
- Directed by: Pierre Moretti
- Written by: Jacques Bobet
- Produced by: Jacques Bobet; René Jodoin
- Cinematography: Murray Fallen; Wayne Trickett
- Edited by: Wayne Duplessis; Yves Leduc
- Music by: Pierre F. Brault
- Production company: National Film Board of Canada
- Release date: 1967
- Running time: 13 minutes
- Country: Canada

A Child in His Country (French: Un enfant...un pays) is a Canadian animated short film, directed by Pierre Moretti and released in 1967. Blending various styles of animation including drawn backgrounds and photographic inserts, the film is a portrait of Canada through the eyes of a young boy who has recently immigrated to the country with his family, and imagines himself in various situations as a hunter of polar bears, a cowboy, a hockey player and a swimmer.

The film's score, by Pierre F. Brault, was noted as one of the first times Brault had ever composed a film score in a rock modality.

It received an honorable mention for Best Animated Short at the 20th Canadian Film Awards in 1968, although no winner was named above it.
