= The Ernie Game =

1967 Canadian film by Don Owen

- Directed by: Don Owen
- Written by: Don Owen
- Produced by: Gordon Burwash
- Starring: Alexis Kanner; Judith Gault; Jackie Burroughs
- Cinematography: Jean-Claude Labrecque; Martin Duckworth
- Edited by: Roy Ayton
- Music by: Kensington Market; Leonard Cohen
- Production companies: National Film Board of Canada; Canadian Broadcasting Corporation
- Distributed by: CBC Television; Columbia Pictures
- Release date: 8 November 1967
- Running time: 89 minutes
- Country: Canada
- Language: English
- Budget: $320,561

The Ernie Game is a 1967 Canadian drama film directed by Don Owen.

== Plot ==
The film centres on Ernie Turner and his attempts to survive in the world after he's released from an asylum. He grows increasingly alienated and his fragile mental state declines, moving between two women, ex-girlfriend and current lover.

== Cast ==
- Alexis Kanner as Ernie Turner
- Judith Gault as Donna
- Jackie Burroughs as Gail
- Leonard Cohen as Singer
- Derek May as Ernie's accomplice
- Louis Negin as Ernie's friend, Max
- Anna Cameron as Social worker
- Corinne Copnick as Landlady
- Rolland D'Amour as Neighbour

== Production ==
The Ernie Game was directed and written by Don Owen, and was shot by Martin Duckworth and Jean-Claude Labrecque using 35 mm film. Kensington Market and Leonard Cohen did the soundtrack for the movie. Owen wrote the script based on material written by Bernard Cole Spencer.

The characters of Gail (Jackie Burroughs) and Donna (Judith Gault) previously appeared in Owen's shorter drama film Notes for a Film About Donna and Gail, although the role of Donna was played by a different actress in the earlier film.

The film, a co-production between the National Film Board of Canada and Canadian Broadcasting Corporation, was filmed in Montreal from 16 January to 1 April 1967. Owen claimed that he had to fight with the NFB in order for the movie to be made and this was the last film he made for the NFB. It was completed with a budget of CA$320,561 (equivalent to $2.91 million in 2025), after initially being budgeted at $265,621 (equivalent to $2.41 million in 2025).

== Release ==
The movie aired on CBC Television on 8 November 1967, and was theatrically distributed by Columbia Pictures for two weeks starting on 17 October 1968. The movie was a commercial failure. Delays by Kensington Market while writing the score, which was completed two weeks before its television premiere, prevented it from appearing at the New York Film Festival and Montreal International Film Festival.

== Reception and legacy ==
Maclean's stated that the film was the "best fiction movie Canada ever made" and Variety stated that it was the "best Canadian feature film made to date". However, Gerald Pratley of the Toronto Telegram stated that it was "an utter failure" and Patrick Scott of the Toronto Star stated that it was "the largest pile of garbage committed to film since the invention of the nickelodeon". Senator Edgar Fournier opposed The Ernie Game and Waiting for Caroline for being "indecent, immoral and repulsive" and both going overbudget. In 2008, it was called "One of the most innovative examples of personal cinema to come from English Canada in the Sixties" by the Cinematheque Ontario.

It was shown at the 18th Berlin International Film Festival and screened in the Director's Fortnight stream at the 1969 Cannes Film Festival.

== Accolades ==
Award	Date of ceremony	Category	Recipient(s)	Result	Ref.
Canadian Film Awards	October 4, 1968	Best Feature Film	The Ernie Game	Won	
Canadian Film Awards	October 4, 1968	Best Director	Don Owen	Won	
Barcelona International Film Festival	1968	Honourable Mention	The Ernie Game	Won	

== Works cited ==
- Evans, Gary (1991). In the National Interest: A Chronicle of the National Film Board of Canada from 1949 to 1989. University of Toronto Press. ISBN 0802027849.
- Edwards, Natale (1973). "Who's Don Owen? What's he done, and what's he doing now?". Cinema Canada. Archived from the original on 14 August 2020.
- Handling, Piers (1976). Canadian Feature Films: 1913-1969; Part 3: 1964-1969. Canadian Film Institute.
