= Ghosts of a River =

1966 documentary film

- French: 3 hommes au mille carré
- Directed by: Pierre Patry; Jacques Kasma
- Produced by: Michel Moreau
- Cinematography: Laval Fortier
- Edited by: Jacques Kasma
- Production company: National Film Board of Canada
- Release date: 1966
- Running time: 19 minutes
- Country: Canada
- Language: French

Ghosts of a River (French: 3 hommes au mille carré, lit. "Three men per square mile") is a Canadian short documentary film, directed by Pierre Patry and Jacques Kasma and released in 1966. The film depicts various ghost towns in British Columbia which have been abandoned in preparation for the construction of hydroelectric dams along the Columbia River.

The film premiered in the Montreal International Film Festival's Festival of Canadian Films lineup in 1966, where it received a special mention from the short film jury. Kasma won the Canadian Film Award for Best Editing at the 19th Canadian Film Awards in 1967.
