= Jacques Kasma =

French and Canadian actor and filmmaker

Jacques Kaszemacher, commonly credited as Jacques Kasma, was a French and Canadian actor and filmmaker. He was most noted as the winner of the Canadian Film Award for Best Editing at the 19th Canadian Film Awards in 1967 for his work on the film Ghosts of a River (Trois hommes au mille carré).

Born in 1935 in Paris, France to Polish Jewish parents Henri Kaszemacher and Chaja Sura Bajwelcwaig, he was hidden for his safety during World War II, during which his parents were both captured by the German Army and died in the Holocaust. He was rescued by the Œuvre de secours aux enfants and lived in orphanages until the age of 18; as a young adult, he studied mime under Marcel Marceau before moving to Montreal, Quebec, in 1956.

In Canada he had various acting roles, including as Ti-Bo in the children's television series La boîte à surprise, as René in the drama series Sous le signe du lion, and as an indigenous warrior in the film Mission of Fear (Astataïon, ou Le Festin des morts), and was an early faculty member of the National Theatre School of Canada, teaching improvisational acting. He worked as an editor for the National Film Board of Canada, including on the films Ghosts of a River, Entre tu et vous and 24 heures ou plus, and was credited as a codirector of Ghosts of a River.

He later left the film industry and trained as a social worker, joining the research team at the Douglas Mental Health University Institute.
