= Paul Hébert =

Canadian actor

Paul Hébert, OC, CQ (May 28, 1924 – April 20, 2017) was a French Canadian television and stage actor and director, and the founder of six theatres in Quebec. He is best known for his role as Siméon Desrosiers in Le Temps d’une paix, a Canadian soap opera.

== Life ==
Hébert was born on May 28, 1924, in Thetford Mines, Quebec, where he was raised by his mother and aunts. He attended high school at the Collège de Lévis in Lévis and university at Université Laval in Quebec City.

He died on April 20, 2017, in Quebec City.

== Career ==
Hébert appeared on many Canadian television series including 14, rue de Galais and Nos étés. He also notable for portraying the French judge Henri Donnedieu de Vabres in the Canadian–American drama film Nuremberg.

He spent the first two years of his career managing Les Comédiens de Québec, a theater company in Quebec City. In 1949, on scholarship from the Arts Council of Great Britain, he traveled to London to study at the Old Vic Theatre School. He returned to Canada in 1952. Between 1954 and 1964, he founded three theatre houses to train actors. In 1982, he opened another theatre house, Théâtre Paul-Hébert in Île d'Orléans. In 1965, he appeared in the Gilles Carle film La Vie heureuse de Léopold Z. He also taught at the National Theatre School that year. During the 1970s, he was the artistic director for Trident Theatre, another house he founded.

He was made an Officer of the Order of Canada on June 29, 1987, for his services to French Canadian entertainment and was made a Knight of the National Order of Quebec in 1994. In 1984, the Université du Québec awarded him an honorary doctorate, as did Université Laval in 2000. In 2007, he earned the Denise-Pelletier Award for Performing Arts, a Governor General's Award, the Academy of Quebec Theatre's Hommage Award and the Victor-Morin Theatre Award.

== Partial filmography ==
- The Luck of Ginger Coffey (1964) - Court Clerk
- Walls of Memory (Mémoire en fête) - 1964, narrator
- Regards sur l'occultisme (2e partie) - Science et esprits (1965) - Narrator
- La vie heureuse de Léopold Z (1965) - Théophile Lemay
- It Isn't Jacques Cartier's Fault (C'est pas la faute à Jacques Cartier) (1968)
- My Side of the Mountain (1969) - Hunter
- The Christmas Martian (Le martien de Noël) (1971) - Le père / Father
- Les jours gris (1974) - Un pensionnaire
- Pardon Mon Affaire (1976) - (uncredited)
- Happy Memories (Les Beaux Souvenirs) (1981) - Marie's father
- Red Eyes (Les Yeux rouges) (1982) - Thomas
- Summer Rain (Pluie d'été) - 1985
- In the Shadow of the Wind (Les Fous de Bassan) (1987) - Timothé Brown
- The Mills of Power (Les tisserands du pouvoir II: La Révolte) (1988)
- La nuit avec Hortense (1988)
- The Confessional (Le Confessionnal) (1995) - The Parish Priest (1989)
- The Ear of a Deaf Man (L'oreille d'un sourd) (1996) - Emile
- The Long Winter (1999) - Grand-père Bouchard
- Nuremberg (2000, TV Mini-Series) - Henri Donnedieu de Vabres
- The Book of Eve (2002) - Mr Cooper
- The Novena (La Neuvaine) (2005) - Prêtre qui bénit
- Route 132 (2010) - Monsieur Crète (final film role)
