= Peter Kastner =

Canadian actor (1943-2008)

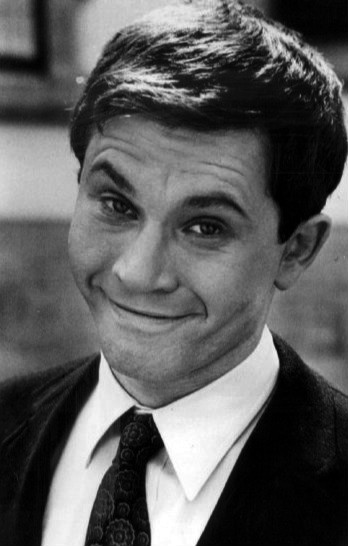
- Kastner publicity photo for The Ugliest Girl in Town (1969)
- Born: 1 October 1943; Toronto, Ontario, Canada
- Died: 18 September 2008 (aged 64); Toronto, Ontario, Canada
- Resting place: Bathurst Lawn Memorial Park
- Spouse: Jenny Pirie (m. 1981)

Peter Kastner (1 October 1943 – 18 September 2008) was a Canadian actor who achieved prominence as a young man in lead roles in the popular 1964 film Nobody Waved Good-bye and in Francis Ford Coppola's 1966 well-received comedy You're a Big Boy Now. He also had a leading role in another film as a young man in 1971 and in a sequel of his debut film in 1984. Additionally, he starred in two short-lived television situation comedy series of 1968 and 1977. Following his promising early success, his career faltered and he became increasingly emotionally troubled in his later years.

== Life and career ==
Kastner was born in Toronto, Ontario, the son of Rose and Martin Kastner. His family was Jewish and prominent in the arts, film and television. His mother was a writer and editor who became involved in television and film productions and his father was an artist. His three siblings all had careers in television, film and journalism.

Kastner's first leading role was in the 1964 Canadian film Nobody Waved Good-bye, which was a semi-improvised, documentary-style look at middle-class teenagers and became a surprise hit. He played an alienated young man, the son of a prosperous automobile dealer, who drifts into petty thievery. The film won awards at several film festivals and in 1984 was rated by the Toronto International Film Festival as the ninth best Canadian feature film of all time.

His breakthrough role was in the title role in Francis Ford Coppola's 1966 comedy You're a Big Boy Now, which starred Elizabeth Hartman, Geraldine Page, Rip Torn, Karen Black, and Julie Harris, in which Kastner played an earnest young man who moves from his parents' house to New York City and struggles with confusing relationships. He was nominated for a BAFTA Award for Most Promising Newcomer to Leading Film Roles for his role in the film.

He played a similar role as an earnest young advertising man swept up in the era in 1971's B.S. I Love You, which had a mixed reception.

Kastner starred in the 1968–1969 ABC sitcom The Ugliest Girl in Town, where he played Timothy Blair, a man who dressed in drag as a favour to his photographer brother. The show was poorly received and cancelled after four months, with the last three produced episodes of its first season left unaired. TV Guide eventually included the show at position 18 in its list of "50 Worst TV Shows of All Time". The Toronto Star said the series had a disastrous effect on his career.

Following Ugliest Girl and B.S. I Love You, Kastner's fortunes declined. Unable to obtain leading roles, he accepted supporting roles in movies and television series for the next several years.

He starred in the 1977 CBC Television sitcom Custard Pie as Leo Strauss, the manager of a musical group of that name, but the series was not popular or critically well received.

His last film role was in Unfinished Business (1984), a generally poorly received sequel to Nobody Waved Good-bye. He later taught at Scituate High School in Scituate, Massachusetts, during the 1990–1991 school year.

== Later life, death and legacy ==
Starting in the early-to-middle 1970s, Kastner became increasingly emotionally troubled and eventually became bitterly estranged from his family, making especially negative allegations about his mother. Around 1976-77, he dated Karen Black, the Hollywood actress with whom he co-starred in You're a Big Boy Now a decade earlier. He held a series of various jobs, allegedly embezzled money from his mother's bank account, and eventually became haggard. He created and tried to promote a self-produced video series in which he commented about his mother.

Kastner died of heart failure in Toronto on 18 September 2008, three weeks before his 65th birthday. He was survived by his second wife, Jenny; his brother, filmmaker and former child actor John Kastner; and two sisters: Susan, a journalist, and Kathy, a CBC Television host; Susan's son Jamie Kastner is a noted documentary filmmaker.

On the occasion of a showing of Nobody Waved Good-bye for a Toronto International Film Festival sesquicentennial celebration of Canadian cinema in 2017, Kastner's siblings wrote an article commenting about his early promise and the later difficulties in his life.
