= Nobody Waved Good-bye =

- Directed by: Don Owen
- Written by: Don Owen
- Produced by: Don Owen; Roman Kroitor; Tom Daly (exec.)
- Starring: Peter Kastner; Julie Biggs
- Cinematography: John Spotton
- Edited by: John Spotton; Donald Ginsberg
- Music by: Eldon Rathburn
- Distributed by: Columbia Pictures (Canada); Cinema V (United States)
- Release dates: August 13, 1964 (Canada); December 12, 1965 (U.S.)
- Running time: 80 minutes
- Country: Canada
- Language: English
- Budget: $73,593

Nobody Waved Good-bye is a 1964 National Film Board of Canada production directed by Don Owen, starring Peter Kastner, Julie Biggs and Claude Rae. A sequel, Unfinished Business, was released in 1984.

== Plot ==
In Toronto, Ontario, Peter is an 18-year-old boy who dislikes the middle-class comfort of his family life, headed by his father, who sells cars for $300 per commission, and what he perceives as society's general fixation on profit. He has a girlfriend, Julie, whose parents dislike him, and his own parents feel he spends too much time with her, at the expense of his school work. Peter steals his father's company car and rides with Julie, only to be arrested for dangerous driving without a licence. He starts meeting with a probation officer weekly, and also leaves home to rent his own place, and finds work.

Unable to make much money, he pressures Julie to find a job. She comes to his residence after a fight with her parents and demands they leave Toronto, telling Peter to borrow money from his father. Peter meets his father at the car dealership, only to find him incensed with Peter's appearance. His father tells him he is a bad investment and he does not want to see him any more. Peter subsequently steals money and a car to leave with Julie. When Julie realizes the truth about Peter's theft, she tells him she is pregnant and that she cannot raise her baby with him.

== Cast ==
- Peter Kastner as Peter
- Julie Biggs as Julie
- Claude Rae as Father
- Toby Tarnow as Sister
- Charmion King as Mother
- Ron Taylor as Boy friend
- Robert Hill as Patrolman
- Jack Beer as Sergeant
- Sean Sullivan as Probation Officer (credited as John Sullivan)
- Lynne Gorman as Julie's mother
- Ivor Barry as Interviewer
- Sharon Bonin as Waitress
- Norman Ettlinger as Landlord
- John Vernon as Lot Supervisor

== Production ==
Don Owen initially wanted to create First Offence, a half-hour television film about probation officers with occasional dramatization, with a budget of $35,000 for the National Film Board of Canada. After filming started Owen believed that it could be extended into a feature film and executive producer Tom Daly increased the budget to $75,000 (equivalent to $750,915 in 2025). No screenplay was written for the film and all of the scenes were improvised based on a short outline that he would discuss with the actors and cameraman John Spotton.

Owen shot 60,000 feet of film, thirty hours of footage, from 21 August to 14 December 1963, in Toronto using 16 mm film. He stated that he was inspired by the direct cinema films of Michel Brault and Gilles Groulx. The film was later blown up to 35 mm. It was filmed with a budget of $73,593 (equivalent to $736,827 in 2025).

The scene of Peter working at a parking lot was shot using hidden cameras and all of the patrons were non-actors. A woman recognized Peter Kastner and talked to him without knowing that she was being filmed.

== Release ==
Nobody Waved Good-bye premiered on 13 August 1964, at the Montreal International Film Festival and was shown at the New York Film Festival in September. Columbia Pictures distributed the film in Canada, but it bombed upon its release in Montreal in November after barely making $700 in a week. It performed better after being released in Toronto in December. It was the NFB's second fictional English-language feature film.

Cinema V purchased the rights to distribute the film in the United States after failing to purchase its worldwide distribution, with the exception of Canada, and released the film in New York on 21 April 1965. $70,000 was spent advertising the movie. The movie performed well in the United States and Columbia expanded its release in Canada in response to the American reception. Départ sans adieux, a version of the movie subtitled in French, was released in Quebec on 23 July 1965.

The film was also shown in Czechoslovakia, Israel, Yugoslavia, and the United Kingdom. The NFB refused a demand by Irish censors to remove all of the references to sex and pregnancy in order for the movie to air on television.

== Reception ==
Judith Crist, a writer for the New York Herald Tribune, stated that it was "A film that you should not miss." after its New York film festival showing. The New Yorker praised the film stating that it was "an exceptionally fine movie". The Washington Post stated that the film was "a statement on the difficulties of being human, of making contact on different wave lengths, of somehow accepting rules one didn't make but which bob up to thwart our erratic desires." in its positive review. In 1966, the National Catholic Office for Motion Pictures listed it as the best theatrical film for the youth. The film was criticized by Nat Taylor who stated that it was "garbage" and "amateur night in Hicksville". Brendan Gill, writing for The New Yorker, compared the film to The Catcher in the Rye. The Toronto International Film Festival listed Nobody Waved Good-bye as the ninth best Canadian feature film of all time in 1984. A sequel, Unfinished Business, was released in 1984, and was panned by critics.

== Accolades ==
Award	Date of ceremony	Category	Recipient(s)	Result	Ref.
International Filmfestival Mannheim-Heidelberg	1964	CIDALC Award	Nobody Waved Good-bye	Won	
Canadian Film Awards	15 May 1965	Best Feature Film	Nobody Waved Good-bye	Nominated	
British Academy of Film and Television Arts	1965	Best Documentary	Nobody Waved Good-bye	Won	
Salerno Film Festival	1968	First Prize	Nobody Waved Good-bye	Won	

== Works cited ==
- Edwards, Natale (1973). "Who's Don Owen? What's he done, and what's he doing now?". Cinema Canada. Archived from the original on 2020-08-14.
- Evans, Gary (1991). In the National Interest: A Chronicle of the National Film Board of Canada from 1949 to 1989. University of Toronto Press. ISBN 0802027849.
- Handling, Piers (1976). Canadian Feature Films: 1913-1969; Part 3: 1964-1969. Canadian Film Institute.
- Melnyk, George (2004). One Hundred Years of Canadian Cinema. University of Toronto Press. ISBN 0802084443.
- Rist, Peter, ed. (2001). Guide To The Cinema(s) of Canada. Greenwood Publishing Group. ISBN 0313299315.
- Voaden, Herman (1966). Nobody Waved Good-Bye and other plays. Macmillan Publishers.
