= Notes for a Film About Donna and Gail =

- Directed by: Don Owen
- Written by: Don Owen; Gerald Taaffe
- Produced by: Julian Biggs
- Starring: Jackie Burroughs; Michèle Chicoine
- Cinematography: Jean-Claude Labrecque
- Edited by: Barrie Howells; John Knight (sound)
- Music by: Malca Gillson (editing)
- Production company: National Film Board of Canada
- Release date: 1966
- Running time: 48 minutes
- Country: Canada
- Language: English

Notes for a Film About Donna and Gail is a 1966 Canadian drama film, directed by Don Owen for the National Film Board of Canada.

The film centres on Donna (Michèle Chicoine) and Gail (Jackie Burroughs), two young women who work together at a dress factory and live together as roommates, tracing the evolution and decline of their friendship in a documentary-style format. It shows the currents that brought them together and the facets of their natures that first made them seem compatible but eventually drove them apart. Their story reflects, to a degree, the situation of anyone who has ever shared the life of another person.

The film makes use of the then-novel device of an unreliable narrator, ultimately revealing that the film is much more about the narrator's skewed perceptions of the women's relationship than it is about the women themselves. It was inspired in part by the contemporaneous films of Jean-Luc Godard.

The characters of Donna and Gail recurred in Owen's 1967 feature film The Ernie Game. Prior to the release of The Ernie Game, in which Donna and Gail were involved in a love triangle with Alexis Kanner's Ernie, some critics who had seen only Notes perceived Donna and Gail as being in a quasi-lesbian relationship; however, Owen demurred on this perception by saying "I really don't know, because, well, what is a lesbian relationship?"

== Awards ==
- Montreal International Film Festival, Montreal: First Prize, Medium Length, 1966
- 19th Canadian Film Awards, Montreal: Genie Award for Best Film, General Information, 1967
- Melbourne Film Festival, Melbourne: Diploma of Merit, 1967
