= Don Owen (filmmaker) =

Canadian filmmaker

- Born: September 19, 1931; Toronto, Ontario, Canada
- Died: February 21, 2016 (aged 84); Toronto, Ontario, Canada
- Occupations: Film director Screenwriter
- Years active: 1958 - 1988

Don Owen (September 19, 1931 – February 21, 2016) was a Canadian film director, writer and producer who spent most of his career with the National Film Board of Canada (NFB). His films Nobody Waved Good-bye and The Ernie Game are regarded as two of the most significant English-Canadian films of the 1960s.

== Early life ==
Owen was born and raised in Toronto and became interested in film at a young age, mainly, he said, because there was nothing to do on Sundays but go to the two films shown by the Toronto Film Society. He intended to become a poet but studied anthropology at the University of Toronto. To earn extra money while he was working on his graduate degree, he got a job as assistant director on the Sidney J. Furie film A Cool Sound from Hell. He worked as a stagehand and writer at the CBC and then landed the job of assistant director to NFB director Don Haldane, who was shooting a film called One Man in Muskoka. Both Haldane and the film’s cinematographer Donald Wilder suggested that he apply to the NFB. This necessitated moving to Montreal and Owen was keen to leave Toronto. Wilder pulled some strings and the NFB hired Owen in 1962.

== Career ==
Owen was hired as a writer, but was put on camera work for the film À St-Henri le cinq septembre (September Five at Saint-Henri). He was taken under the wing of producer Tom Daly and became part of the NFB’s storied Unit B. Owen suggested that he create a film about the Olympic runner Bruce Kidd; Daly approved it and the result was the critically-acclaimed Runner (with the narration written by W. H. Auden and voiced by Don Francks). Runner was innovative and mesmerizing and, from then on, Owen was a full-time director.

Because Owen was very vocal about what he saw was Toronto’s boring, uptight Anglicism, he was chosen to make a film that “would make Toronto look interesting”. He gathered together the most eccentric musicians he knew and made the short documentary Toronto Jazz. It featured Lenny Breau, Larry Dubin, Don Francks, Clem Hambourg, Alf Jones, Michael Snow and Don Thompson,

By now, Owen had developed a reputation for being ‘’difficult’’. Bruce Kidd reported that his perfectionism was exhausting but, more importantly, the NFB was a government organization, and films were produced with a team approach. Owen did not always toe the line; he believed that it was important for filmmakers to “take chances”, “go out on a limb” and then have the courage to stand behind their work.

This became most apparent when he was asked to make a half-hour documentary on juvenile delinquency and how police dealt with it. It was the summer of 1963, Owen was shooting in Toronto, and his superiors were in Montreal; many were on vacation. There was no script—Owen gave the actors short notes before each scene and they improvised. They shot all summer. The most senior executive on the project was cinematographer John Spotton who, while respecting the work that Owen was doing, could not hide the fact that they had shot 60,000 feet of film, without permission. When this was discovered in September, some NFB executives were outraged, but Daly liked what he saw and gave Owen more money to re-shoot certain scenes. The result was the 80-minute feature Nobody Waved Good-bye. It was released in the summer of 1964; Canadian reviews were lukewarm, at best. But when it was screened at the New York Film Festival, it was heaped with praise and went on to become an international hit. Because it was improvised, the British Academy of Film and Television Arts classified it as a documentary and it won the 1965 BAFTA Award for Best Documentary.

Owen had four films released in 1965, including Ladies and Gentlemen... Mr. Leonard Cohen and High Steel, a 15-minute colour documentary about the Canadian Caughnawaga First Nations peoples who worked on Manhattan skyscraper projects. On July 31, 1965, in an interview with Dusty Vineberg of the Montreal Star, Owen attributed the success of High Steel to the fact that he wrote, directed, and edited it himself, calling this "a welding of three aspects of filmmaking that many young filmmakers increasingly insist is vital to integrity."

In 1966 he directed the acclaimed Notes for a Film About Donna and Gail and began work on an NFB/CBC co-production, a trilogy of films on mental illness. It turned out to be two films: A Further Glimpse of Joey and The Ernie Game, a film about a bi-sexual transient street hustler. When it aired on the CBC, there was a public outcry, with people decrying the use of public funds to portray such a subject. In Parliament, one member declared it was "indecent, immoral and repulsive".

Owen officially left the NFB in 1969, but spent the next 20 years moving back and forth between it and the CBC. His only commercially-produced film was the 1976 thriller Partners, which was not a success. He co-produced his last two films with the NFB: 1984's Unfinished Business (a sequel to Nobody Waved Good-bye), and the 1988 feature Turnabout. He retired in 1988.

Owen was the subject of a retrospective at the 2005 Toronto International Film Festival; this coincided with the release of his book, Poems & Paintings by Don Owen: Yab Yum Wrap Rap.

== Personal life and death ==
Owen was a Buddhist and student of the Tibetan Buddhist meditation master Chögyam Trungpa, who had settled in Halifax, Nova Scotia. Owen spent time at Trungpa's Rocky Mountain Dharma Center, a retreat center in Red Feather Lakes, Colorado. Trungpa’s organization Vajradhatu established meditation centers all over North America; in 1972, Owen founded the Toronto center at his small farm in Green River, Ontario. From 1976 to 1978, Owen taught film courses at Naropa University, which Trungpa founded in 1974. Owen returned to the seminary in 1990, after his last film, Turnabout. In order to be part of Trungpa’s inner circle, one had to practice complete discretion and keep all activities secret; Owen explained his long absences by telling people that he had to take time off to look after his children while his wife traveled.

In 2011, Owen suffered a stroke and he spent the rest of his life in Toronto’s Kensington Gardens Nursing Home, cared for by Tibetan nurses. Bed-ridden and unable to read or write, he dictated poems to staff and friends; through dictation, he was also working on a screenplay called The Postmistress, in which he wanted Sally Field to play the title role. A few months before his death, in late 2015, Owen's memoir was published. Its title, Captain Donald's Quest for Crazy Wisdom is a reference to Trungpa's 'Crazy Wisdom' theory.

In early February 2016, Owen suffered a series of small strokes and stopped eating and drinking. He died on February 21 at age 84. He had been married once (to Suzanne Gobeil) and was survived by two sons. His funeral service was the Pure Realm of Shambhala Ceremony at the Shambhala Meditation Centre of Toronto.

== Filmography ==
- A Cool Sound from Hell - feature, Caribou Productions, Sidney J. Furie 1959 - assistant director
- One Man in Muskoka - documentary short, NFB, Don Haldane 1961 - assistant director
- À St-Henri le cinq septembre - documentary, NFB, Hubert Aquin 1962 - cinematographer
- Runner - documentary short, NFB, 1962 - editor, writer, director
- Toronto Jazz - documentary short, NFB, 1963 - editor, writer, director
- Nobody Waved Good-bye - feature, NFB, 1964 - writer, director, co-producer with Roman Kroitor
- Two Men of Montreal - documentary, NFB, 1965 - co-director with Suzanne Angel and Donald Brittain
- You Don’t Back Down - documentary short, NFB, 1965 - director
- High Steel - documentary short, NFB, 1965 - editor, writer, director
- Ladies and Gentlemen... Mr. Leonard Cohen - documentary, NFB, 1965 - co-director with Donald Brittain
- Notes for a Film About Donna & Gail - short film, NFB, 1966 - director, co-writer with Gerald Taaffe
- A Further Glimpse of Joey - short film, NFB, 1966 - director
- The Ernie Game - feature, NFB, 1967 - writer, director
- Monique Leyrac in Concert - documentary, NFB, 1969 - director
- Gallery: A View of Time, Albright-Knox Art Gallery 1969 - producer, director
- Telescope - Mordecai Richler Living in London - TV series episode, CBC, 1971 - director
- Telescope - Snow in Venice - TV series episode, CBC, 1971 - director
- Cowboy and Indian - documentary, NFB, 1972 - editor, writer, director
- To See Ourselves: Changes - TV series episode, CBC, 1974 - director
- The Collaborators: Undercover - TV series episode, CBC, 1974 - director
- The Collaborators: Dreams and Things - TV series episode, CBC, 1974 - director
- The Collaborators: A Little Something for the Old Age - TV series episode, CBC, 1974 - director
- Canadian Film Makers: Not Far From Home - TV series episode, CBC, 1974 - director
- Partners - feature, Clearwater Films, 1976 - co-writer, co-producer, director
- Holstein - documentary short, NFB, 1979 - editor, director
- Spread Your Wings: Tanya’s Puppet - TV series episode, 1981 - director
- Unfinished Business - feature, NFB, 1984 - writer, director, co-producer with Annette Cohen
- Danger Bay: Jan - TV series episode, CBC 1988 - director
- Turnabout - feature, Zebra Film & NFB 1988 - writer, director, co-producer with Don Haig

(Due to confusion with the wrestling promotor Don Owen, biographers have incorrectly credited Owen the filmmaker as being the cinematographer on the film Wrestling. Owen did not work on that film.)

== Awards ==
Runner (1962)

- Golden Gate International Film Festival, San Francisco: Honorable Mention, Film as Art, 1963
- Midwest Film Festival, University of Chicago, Chicago: Donald Perry Award, 1963

Nobody Waved Goodbye (1964)

- 18th British Academy Film Awards, London: BAFTA Award for Best Documentary, 1965
- Salerno Film Festival, Salerno, Italy: First Prize, 1968
- Mannheim-Heidelberg International Film Festival, Mannheim, Germany: CIDALC Award, 1964
- International Film Festival at Addis Ababa, Addis Ababa, Ethiopia: Third Prize, Feature Film, 1966
- Toronto International Film Festival, Toronto: 9th Place, Canada’s Ten-Best Films, 1984

High Steel (1965)

- Cork International Film Festival, Cork, Ireland: Bronze Statuette of St. Finbarr - First Prize, Documentary, 1966
- Locarno Film Festival, Locarno, Switzerland: Diploma of Honour, 1967
- Kraków Film Festival, Kraków, Poland: Diploma of Honour, 1967
- Melbourne Film Festival, Melbourne: Diploma of Merit, 1967
- International Days of Short Films, Tours, France: Prize of the Cine-Clubs, 1967
- Berlin International Film Festival, Berlin: Special Youth Prize, 1967
- 18th Canadian Film Awards, Montreal: Best Editing, 1966

Ladies and Gentlemen... Mr. Leonard Cohen (1965)

- 18th Canadian Film Awards, Montreal: Genie Award for Best Film, TV Information, 1966
- American Film and Video Festival, New York: Blue Ribbon, Literature, 1966
- International Festival of Short Films, Philadelphia: Award for Exceptional Merit, 1968

Notes for a Film About Donna and Gail (1966)

- Montreal International Film Festival, Montreal: First Prize, Medium Length, 1966
- 19th Canadian Film Awards, Montreal: Genie Award for Best Film, General Information, 1967
- Melbourne Film Festival, Melbourne: Diploma of Merit, 1967

The Ernie Game (1967)

- 20th Canadian Film Awards, Toronto: Genie Award for Best Feature Film, 1968
- 20th Canadian Film Awards, Toronto: Genie Award for Best Direction to Don Owen, 1968
- Barcelona International Film Festival, Barcelona: Honourable Mention, 1968
