= Mission of Fear =

- French: Astataïon, ou Le Festin des morts
- Directed by: Fernand Dansereau
- Written by: Alec Pelletier
- Produced by: André Belleau
- Starring: Alain Cuny
- Cinematography: Georges Dufaux
- Edited by: Fernand Dansereau
- Music by: Maurice Blackburn
- Distributed by: National Film Board
- Release date: May 20, 1965
- Running time: 77 minutes
- Country: Canada
- Language: French

Mission of Fear (French: Astataïon, ou Le Festin des morts) is a Canadian drama film, directed by Fernand Dansereau and released in 1965.

Based on The Jesuit Relations, the film dramatizes the story of the Canadian Martyrs at the Jesuit mission of Sainte-Marie among the Hurons through the reflections of Jean de Brébeuf (Alain Cuny) as he awaits his death. The cast also includes Jacques Godin, François Guillier, Jacques Kasma, Ginette Letondal, Hubert Loiselle, Yves Létourneau, Monique Mercure, Albert Millaire, Jean-Louis Millette, Jean Perraud, Jean-Guy Sabourin, Marcel Sabourin, Janine Sutto and Maurice Tremblay.

The film won the award for Best Feature Film at the Canadian Film Awards in 1966.

The film was one of the first times that bare breasts were shown on television with its airing by the Canadian Broadcasting Corporation in 1965.

== Works cited ==
- Marshall, Bill (2001). Quebec National Cinema. McGill–Queen's University Press. ISBN 0-7735-2103-8.
