= Ron Kelly =

Canadian film director and screenwriter (born 1929)

- Born: June 11, 1929; Vancouver, British Columbia, Canada
- Died: April 25, 2026 (aged 96); Peterborough, Ontario, Canada
- Occupations: Film director Screenwriter; Film producer
- Years active: 1956–2026

Ronald Arthur Kelly (June 11, 1929 – April 25, 2026) was a Canadian film director, film producer, and screenwriter. He began his career with the CBC film unit, directing many short and documentary films between 1952 and 1964. He traveled to France, Spain and Mexico producing and directing documentaries independently from 1956 to 1958. From 1959 to 1962, he studied at Pinewood Studios, England, on a Canadian Arts Council fellowship and while there produced and directed documentaries for the BBC, CBC and National Office of Film, UK. In 1967, he co-wrote and directed the feature film Waiting for Caroline, as a commemoration of Canada's centennial year. Waiting for Caroline was distributed internationally by United Artists, Hollywood. In Hollywood in 1968, Kelly directed for Twentieth Century Fox Studios and Disney Studio. In 1970, he returned to Canada, writing, directing and producing dramas and documentaries for the NFB and CBC. His most recent film is Victims of Victims (2004), a documentary exploration of the Palestinian-Israeli conflict.

Kelly died in Peterborough, Ontario, on April 25, 2026, at the age of 96.

== Awards and recognition ==
Ron Kelly received the Palme d'Or for England at the Cannes Film Festival, 1962 for The Tearaways. In 1965, he received a Canadian Film Award for Best Direction for his film The Gift, a documentary on Hiroshima, and again in 1967 for an episode of the TV Series Wojeck entitled The Last Man in the World. The latter also received the Golden Globe Award at Monte Carlo. Kelly's television productions of The Open Grave (a 1964 episode of the TV series Horizon) and The Megantic Outlaw (1970) were also winners of Canadian Film Awards, and The Open Grave won the Prix Italia in Genoa. The Irish received 1st prize for documentaries at the New York Film Festival, and the Atlanta Film Festival and the Chicago Film Festival's Gold Bear Award in 1975.

== Partial filmography ==
- The Open Grave (1964)
- Centennial Travellers (Documentary, 1965)
- Quo Vadis, Mrs. Lumb? (Documentary, 1965)
- The Gift (1965)
- Valley in a River (Documentary, 1966)
- The Last Man in the World (1966)
- Waiting for Caroline (1967)
- King of the Grizzlies (1970)
- The Megantic Outlaw (1971)
- Springhill (1972)
