= Jean-Claude Labrecque =

Canadian director and cinematographer (1938–2019)

- Born: June 19, 1938; Quebec City, Quebec, Canada
- Died: May 31, 2019 (aged 80); Montreal, Quebec, Canada
- Occupations: Film director Cinematographer; Film editor
- Years active: 1963 – 2019

Jean-Claude Labrecque, CM CQ (June 19, 1938 – May 31, 2019) was a director and cinematographer who learned the basics of filmmaking at the National Film Board of Canada.

== Career ==
Jean-Claude Labrecque was born in Quebec City, Quebec, and trained as a camera assistant at the NFB. As a cinematographer, he shot many of the early key films of Claude Jutra (À tout prendre), Michel Brault (Entre la mer et l'eau douce), Gilles Carle (La vie heureuse de Léopold Z), Gilles Groulx (Le Chat dans le sac) and Don Owen (Notes for a Film About Donna and Gail, The Ernie Game). He turned to directing in 1965 with 60 Cycles, about a long-distance bike race on the North Shore of the St. Lawrence River, which has been described as a virtual encyclopedia of camera techniques. It won 22 international awards and was nominated for a BAFTA. He left the NFB in 1967 to set-up his own production company, although he continued to freelance with the Board.

Throughout his lengthy career, Jean-Claude Labrecque's interests focused on matters of concern to the Québécois people, whether in sports, culture or politics. His better-known films include La Visite du Général de Gaulle au Québec (where he captured on film the infamous 'Vive le Québec libre!' outburst by French President Charles de Gaulle), Games of the XXI Olympiad and his second feature, Les Vautours, an eloquent and charming personal meditation on the birth of a generation, considered by critics to be his best film. More recently he has served as Bernard Émond's cameraman on such critically acclaimed films as The Woman Who Drinks (La Femme qui boit), The Novena (La Neuvaine) and Summit Circle (Contre toute espérance). Among his many awards and citations, he won two Canadian Film Awards, in 1964 and 1970, and the Prix Jutra for best documentary in 2003. He has lectured on filmmaking at Université du Québec à Montréal.

== Filmography ==
=== Fiction ===
- The Wise Guys (Les Smattes) – 1972
- The Vultures (Les vautours) – 1975
- The Coffin Affair (L'Affaire Coffin) – 1979
- The Years of Dreams and Revolt (Les Années de rêves) – 1984
- Aéroport: Court-circuit – TV movie, 1984
- Brother André (Le Frère André) – 1987
- Bonjour Monsieur Gauguin – 1988

=== Documentaries ===
- Lewis Mumford on the City, Part 6: The City and the Future (Short film Co-Directed with various, 1963)
- 60 Cycles (Short film, 1965)
- Intermède (Short film, 1966)
- La visite du général de Gaulle au Québec (Short film, 1967)
- La vie (Short film Co-Directed with Jean-Louis Frund, 1968)
- La guerre des pianos (Short film Co-Directed with Jean Dansereau, 1969)
- Hiver en froid mineur (Short film, 1969)
- Les canots de glace (Short film, 1969)
- Essai à la mille (Short film, 1970)
- La nuit de la poésie 27 mars 1970 (Co-Directed with Jean-Pierre Masse, 1970)
- Canada the Land (Short film Co-Directed with Rex Tasker, 1971)
- Images de la Gaspésie (Short film, 1972)
- Hochelaga (Short film, 1972)
- Université du Québec (Short film, 1972)
- Les notes de la vie (Short film, 1973)
- L'entreprise de toute une vie (Episode of Relation Pedagogique series co-directed with Jacques Gagné, 1973)
- Claude Gauvreau – poète (Short film, 1974)
- Québec fête juin '75 (Co-Directed with Claude Jutra, 1976)
- On s'pratique... c'est pour les Olympiques (Short film, 1976)
- Games of the XXI Olympiad (Jeux de la XXIe olympiade) (Co-Directed with Jean Beaudin, Marcel Carrière and Georges Dufaux, 1977)
- Claude Gauvreau (Short film, 1977)
- Gaston Miron (Short film, 1977)
- Gatien Lapointe (Short film, 1977)
- Jean-Guy Pilon (Short film, 1977)
- Michèle Lalonde (Short film, 1977)
- Nicole Brossard (Short film Co-Directed with Jean-Pierre Masse, 1977)
- Paul Chamberland (Short film Co-Directed with Jean-Pierre Masse, 1977)
- Suzanne Paradis (Short film, 1977)
- Yves Préfontaine (Short film Co-Directed with Jean-Pierre Masse, 1977)
- Panneau réclame (Short film Co-Directed with Jean-Pierre Masse, 1977)
- ...26 fois de suite! (Short film, 1978)
- Les montagnais (Short film, 1979)
- Le dernier des coureurs des bois (Short film, 1979)
- La nuit de la poésie 28 mars 1980 (Co-Directed with Jean-Pierre Masse, 1980)
- Paroles du Québec (1980)
- Marie Uguay (Short film, 1982)
- Les amis de la cinématheque (1988)
- L'histoire des trois (1990)
- La nuit de la poésie 15 mars 1991 (Co-Directed with Jean-Pierre Masse, 1991)
- 67 bis, boulevard Lannes (Short film, 1991)
- André Mathieu, musicien (1993)
- Le sorcier (Documentary TV series, 1994)
- Parents malgré tout (Documentary TV series, 1996)
- Le roman de l'homme (Documentary TV series, 1997)
- L'aventure des compagnons de St-Laurent (1997)
- Nos récits de voyage (Short film, 1997)
- Portager le rêve (Short film Co-Directed with André Gladu, 1998)
- Anticosti - Au temps des Menier (Short film, 1999)
- Le RIN (2002)
- Un théâtre dans la cité: Le TNM (Short film Co-Directed with Yves Desgagnés, 2002)
- À hauteur d'homme (2003)
- Le grand dérangement de Saint-Paulin Dalibaire (Short film, 2004)
- Le chemin d'eau de la Basse-Côte-Nord (2005)
- Forever Quebec (Infiniment Québec) (Short film, 2008)
- Félix (Short film, 2008)

== Awards and honours ==
- Winner of the Prix Albert-Tessier for an outstanding career in Québec cinema.
- Winner of the Prix Hommage at the 2008 edition of the Jutras
- Knight of the National Order of Quebec in 2009
- Member of the Order of Canada in 2009 "for his contributions to the development of film as a director of documentaries and fictional films, and as a renowned director of photography here in Canada and abroad".
