= Ladies and Gentlemen... Mr. Leonard Cohen =

- Directed by: Don Owen; Donald Brittain
- Written by: Donald Brittain
- Produced by: John Kemeny
- Cinematography: Paul Leach; Laval Fortier; Roger Racine
- Edited by: Barrie Howells
- Production company: National Film Board of Canada
- Release date: 1965
- Running time: 44 minutes
- Country: Canada
- Language: English

Ladies and Gentlemen... Mr. Leonard Cohen is a 1965 National Film Board of Canada documentary about Leonard Cohen, co-directed by Don Owen and Donald Brittain, written by Brittain and produced by John Kemeny.

The documentary captures Cohen's career as a noted poet and novelist before he launched his career as a singer-songwriter in 1967. The original idea for the film had involved documenting a tour of Canadian poets, including Irving Layton and Earle Birney; however, that idea was abandoned when the filmmakers decided the other poets would not serve as charismatic film subjects.

== Contents ==
Shot and edited in the Direct Cinema style, the filmmakers follow Cohen through his hometown of Montreal, Quebec, as he moves from poetry readings at McGill University, Cohen's alma mater, to a television appearance with his friend and fellow poet Irving Layton and host Pierre Berton, to his childhood home sitting with his mother, to his "three-dollar-a-night hotel room" in a shady part of the city. The audio is a mix of traditional voice-over, interviews with Cohen, along with Cohen's own poetry. The poems read are mostly taken from The Spice-Box of Earth and Flowers for Hitler, including:

- I Have Not Lingered in European Monasteries
- Prayer for Messiah
- A Kite is a Victim
- Disguises
- Beneath My Hands
- Here Was the Market
- Twelve O'Clock Chant
- As the Mist Leaves No Scar
- The Genius
- On Hearing a Name Long Unspoken
- Three Good Nights
- Alexander Trocchi, Public Junkie, Priez Pour Nous
- Hydra 1963
- The Only Tourist in Havana Turns His Thoughts Homeward
- The Music Crept By Us

== Themes ==
The central themes of the documentary include fame, authorship, image, irony and artifice. Cohen himself comments multiple times on the artificial nature of documentary filmmaking and storytelling. Throughout the film Cohen is aware that he is on camera, and actively shaping his own image, along with the filmmakers. Cohen is in fact a collaborator in this artificial process to the extent that the film ends with a sort of postscript, where Cohen has been invited to watch the film in a screening room alongside Don Owen. Cohen remarks on the fraud of the camera crew showing him pretend to sleep. Cohen then discusses how strange it is that he let them film him in the bathtub. In the footage they watch, a naked Cohen writes "CAVEAT EMPTOR," Latin for "buyer beware" on the wall next to the bathtub. Cohen says "I had to act as a double agent... let the [audience] know that this is not entirely devoid of the con." Earlier, following his TV appearance with Pierre Berton, Owen asks Cohen what Berton wanted from him and Cohen replied "He wanted me to cut my con out... What's the true story? Is wrestling really fixed?"

Unlike contemporaneous Direct Cinema documentaries on similar subjects, most notably Lonely Boy, by Roman Kroitor and Wolf Koenig, Cohen is given licence to comment on the proceedings, as and even after they happen. Where in Lonely Boy Paul Anka is only the subject, and often the dupe, of Koenig and Kroitor's investigation of fame and artifice, in Ladies and Gentleman..., Cohen is in on the con as a collaborator and co-conspirator. To this end, Cohen is allowed to manufacture irony, along with the directors throughout the film, including as he watches himself fumble with horizontal blinds in his hotel room and comments ironically, "I was always good with my hands."

== Awards ==
- 18th Canadian Film Awards, Montreal: Genie Award for Best Film, TV Information, 1966
- American Film and Video Festival, New York: Blue Ribbon, Literature, 1966
- International Festival of Short Films, Philadelphia: Award for Exceptional Merit, 1968
