= High Steel =

- Directed by: Don Owen
- Written by: Don Owen
- Produced by: Julian Biggs
- Starring: Harold McComber
- Narrated by: Don Francks
- Cinematography: John Spotton
- Edited by: Don Owen
- Music by: Bruce Mackay
- Production company: National Film Board of Canada
- Release date: 1965
- Running time: 13 minutes 7 seconds
- Country: Canada
- Language: English

High Steel is a 1965 short National Film Board of Canada documentary film directed by Don Owen about Mohawk Ironworkers from Kahnawake building New York City skycrapers.

== Synopsis ==
Featuring breathtaking sequences of workers walking along narrow steel beams high above street level, High Steel is based largely on the experiences of one Mohawk ironworker working in Manhattan, Harold McComber. The film contrasts the daring work of McComber and his coworkers in the skies above New York City with life back home in Kahnawake. It also explains how the Mohawk people living across the Saint Lawrence River from Montreal first gained their reputation for high steel work in the late 19th century by working on a railway bridge that ran through their land. However, as the film recounts through narration and archival photos, such a reputation came at a terrible cost. While working on the Quebec Bridge farther down river near Quebec City, dozens of Mohawks were among the 75 men killed during its 1907 construction collapse with a devastating impact on the small community. While celebrating their courage and skill, the film also makes it plain how the Mohawks are forced to leave home to make a living, and McComber regrets that his sons have had to grow up without their father.

== Production ==
The film's director of photography was John Spotton, with Don Francks as narrator, Julian Biggs as producer, and a song by Bruce Mackay, "Mountains of Iron and Steel" (replacing Gordon Lightfoot, who was originally supposed to have provided music). The film was shot using 35 mm cameras, with film crews having to gain access to the construction site high above the ground by traversing a ladder from an adjacent building.

== Awards ==
- Cork International Film Festival, Cork, Ireland: Bronze Statuette of St. Finbarr - First Prize, Documentary, 1966
- Locarno Film Festival, Locarno, Switzerland: Diploma of Honour, 1967
- Kraków Film Festival, Kraków, Poland: Diploma of Honour, 1967
- Melbourne Film Festival, Melbourne: Diploma of Merit, 1967
- International Days of Short Films, Tours, France: Prize of the Cine-Clubs, 1967
- Berlin International Film Festival, Berlin: Special Youth Prize, 1967
- 18th Canadian Film Awards, Montreal: Best Editing, to Don Owen 1966

== See also ==
- Mohawk skywalkers
