= Albert Millaire =

Canadian actor and theatre director (1935–2018)

Albert Millaire CC, CQ
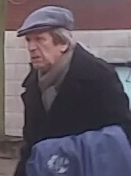
- Millaire in 2017
- Born: Rodolphe Albert Millaire; January 18, 1935; Montreal, Quebec, Canada
- Died: August 15, 2018 (aged 83); Montreal, Quebec, Canada
- Education: Conservatoire d'art dramatique de Montréal
- Occupations: Actor, director
- Years active: 1956-2015

Rodolphe Albert Millaire, CC, CQ (January 18, 1935 – August 15, 2018) was a Canadian actor and theatre director.

== Life ==
Millaire was born in Montreal. He was raised by a single mother, after his father died when Millaire was less than a year old. He was first inspired to become an actor after seeing Laurence Olivier's 1948 film performance of Hamlet.

Soon after completing his studies at the Conservatoire d'art dramatique de Montréal, Millaire became prominent on the Quebec theatre scene. He was particularly noted in performances in Alfred de Musset's Lorenzaccio, Molière's Tartuffe and Dom Juan, Shakespeare's Hamlet, and Roch Carrier's La céleste bicyclette.

Millaire had worked behind the scenes at Montreal's Théâtre du Nouveau-Monde, and had acted and directed in English at the Stratford Festival of Canada. His notable performances on television include such historical figures as Pierre Le Moyne d'Iberville and Sir Wilfrid Laurier, as well a noted stage performance as Louis Riel. Although acting primarily in French, he was also sometimes seen in English roles, including Adventures in Rainbow Country, By Way of the Stars and Road to Avonlea.

He had been chairman of the Académie québécoise de théâtre and the Canadian Council on the Status of the Artist.

He was married twice, first to Rita Imbault and later to television director Michèle Marchand.

Millaire died of cancer in Montreal on August 15, 2018, aged 83.

== Awards and recognition ==
- Officer, Order of Canada, 1989
- Companion, Order of Canada, 2001
- Knight, National Order of Quebec
- Recipient of the Governor General's Performing Arts Award for Lifetime Artistic Achievement, 2006
