= Fernand Dansereau =

Canadian film director and film producer

- Born: April 5, 1928 (age 98); Montreal, Quebec, Canada
- Occupations: Film director Film producer Screenwriter
- Years active: 1955–present

Fernand Dansereau CM OQ (born April 5, 1928) is a Québécois film director and film producer.

== Biography ==
After five years working as a reporter for the Montreal daily Le Devoir, Dansereau joined the NFB in 1955. He was a founding member of the NFB's French Unit and until 1960, he wrote and directed several feature films and documentaries for the series Panorama. He worked on the television series Temps présent from 1960 to 1964 and then returned to directing with the fiction feature Le festin des morts which won 2 Canadian Film Awards including Best Feature Film in 1966. He left the NFB in 1970 for the private sector. Among his many achievements, he wrote and directed the feature documentary Faut aller parmi l'monde pour le savoir (1971) which was selected for the Directors' Fortnight at the Cannes Film Festival in 1972. His 1977 feature Thetford au milieu de notre vie (co-directed with Iolande Cadrin-Rossignol) about life in a Québécois mining town became another career highlight. His dramatic feature Doux aveux (1982) garnered 4 Genie Award nominations in 1983. Most recently, Dansereau made the dramatic feature La brunante (2007) which was nominated for best film and best director at the 2008 Jutra Awards.

In 2005, he was awarded the Prix Albert-Tessier. In 2003, he received the Prix Lumière for his outstanding contribution to the profession and in 2009 received the Jutra Lifetime Achievement Award. In 2019, Dansereau was appointed as a Member of the Order of Canada and, in 2020, and Officer in the National Order of Quebec.

== Selected filmography ==
=== Fiction ===
- Le maître du Pérou - Short, 1958
- Pays neuf - Short, 1958
- La Canne à pêche - Short, 1959
- Mission of Fear (Astataïon ou Le festin des morts) - 1965
- This Is No Time for Romance (Ça n'est pas le temps des romans) - Short, 1966
- Contrat d’amour - Short, 1973
- Simple histoire d’amours (1974)
- Thetford au milieu de notre vie - Co-Directed with Iolande Cadrin-Rossignol, 1978
- Sweet Lies and Loving Oaths (Doux aveux) - 1982
- Twilight (La Brunante) - 2007

=== Documentaries ===
- La communauté juive de Montréal - 1956, short
- Pierre Beaulieu, agriculteur - 1959, short
- John Lyman, peintre - 1959, short
- Les Administrateurs - 1960, co-directed with Jacques Godbout
- Congrès - 1961, short co-directed with Jean Dansereau and Georges Dufaux
- Éducation populaire - 1968, series of 30 shorts
- Saint-Jerome - 1968
- Jonquière - 1969, short
- Québec ski - 1970, short
- Tout le temps, tout le temps, tout le temps...? - 1970
- Comité d’expression populaire - 1971
- It Is Necessary to Be Among the Peoples of the World to Know Them (Faut aller parmi l'monde pour le savoir) - 1971
- Vivre entre les mots - 1972
- Quotidien series - 1975-77, series of 28 shorts co-directed with Iolande Cadrin-Rossignol
- L’autre côté de la lune - 1994
- Quelques raisons d’espérer - 2001
- Hope Builders (Les porteurs d'espoir) - 2010
