= Werner Nold =

Swiss-Canadian film editor (1933–2024)

Werner Nold CM CQ (December 19, 1933, Samedan – February 28, 2024) was a Swiss-Canadian film editor, active predominantly in the cinema of Quebec.

Over a 35-year career at the National Film Board of Canada (NFB), Nold worked on approximately 100 films. He also co-founded the Conseil québécois pour la diffusion du cinéma and served as president of the Rendez-vous du cinéma québécois.

In 1984, he was named a Member of the Order of Canada, and 2012, he was named as a Knight of the National Order of Quebec. In 2010, he received the Prix Albert-Tessier from the government of Quebec for his contributions to the cinema of Quebec.

Born in Switzerland, Nold moved to Quebec in 1955, while in his early 20s. He was hired by the NFB in 1961, and retired from film editing in 1996, when back trouble made long hours of sitting too painful. He lived with his wife of over 40 years, Lucette Lupien, in Montreal's Habitat 67 complex. Werner Nold died on February 28, 2024, at the age of 90.
