= Between Sweet and Salt Water =

- French: Entre la mer et l'eau douce
- Directed by: Michel Brault
- Written by: Michel Brault; Gérald Godin; Marcel Dubé; Claude Jutra; Denys Arcand
- Starring: Claude Gauthier; Geneviève Bujold; Denise Bombardier; Robert Charlebois
- Cinematography: Michel Brault; Bernard Gosselin; Jean-Claude Labrecque
- Edited by: Michel Brault; Werner Nold
- Music by: Claude Gauthier
- Release date: 1967
- Running time: 85 minutes
- Country: Canada
- Language: French

Between Sweet and Salt Water (French: Entre la mer et l'eau douce), also known as Drifting Upstream, is a 1967 Québécois film directed by Michel Brault, co-written by Brault, Gérald Godin, Marcel Dubé, Claude Jutra and Denys Arcand.

The film also features boxer Ronald Jones in a small role. Jones was one of the subjects of Gilles Groulx's 1961 documentary Golden Gloves.

== Plot ==
Claude (Claude Gauthier) leaves his small town on the Côte-Nord to go to Montreal, where he works several odd jobs and eventually falls in love with Geneviève (Geneviève Bujold), a pretty waitress who works in a local diner. Claude enters a singing contest that launches his career. As he gradually becomes more well known, he has a brief affair with a married woman and breaks up with Geneviève. He returns to his hometown but nothing seems the same. Back in Montreal, he becomes increasingly more successful as a singer. One night he meets Geneviève backstage, only to learn she is now married, and realizes one can be as lonely in a small town as in a big city.

== Cast ==
- Claude Gauthier as Claude Tremblay
- Geneviève Bujold as Geneviève
- Paul Gauthier as Roger Tremblay
- Denise Bombardier as Denyse
- Robert Charlebois as Ti-Paul
- Louise Latraverse as Aude, la soeur de Claude
- Gérald Godin as Steve
- Reggie Chartrand as Réginald

== Additional information ==
This film has also been released under the following titles:

- Entre la mer et l'eau douce - Canada (original title)
- Zwischen den Welten - Austria (TV title) / East Germany (TV title) / West Germany (TV title)
- Drifting Upstream - Canada (English title)
- Mellan hav och stilla vatten - Sweden

== Reception ==
Entre la mer et l'eau douce is widely regarded as Michel Brault's most poetic and richly complex film.

The film was screened in the Director's Fortnight stream at the 1969 Cannes Film Festival.
