= Donald Brittain =

Canadian filmmaker (1928–1989)

Donald Brittain OC
- Born: June 10, 1928; Ottawa, Ontario
- Died: July 21, 1989 (aged 61); Montreal, Quebec
- Known for: Filmmaker
- Awards: Order of Canada

Donald Code Brittain, OC (June 10, 1928 – July 21, 1989) was a film director and producer with the National Film Board of Canada.

== Career ==
Fields of Sacrifice (1964) is considered Brittain's first major film as director. His other notable directorial credits include the 1964 feature documentary Bethune, 1965 documentaries Ladies and Gentlemen... Mr. Leonard Cohen and Memorandum and the Genie Award-winning 1979 documentary Paperland: The Bureaucrat Observed. He also directed the first-ever IMAX film, Tiger Child for Expo '70, and Earthwatch, a 70mm film for Expo 86.

He wrote the 1975 Oscar-nominated short documentary Whistling Smith. He co-directed the 1976 feature documentary Volcano: An Inquiry Into the Life and Death of Malcolm Lowry which garnered 6 Canadian Film Awards and an Academy Award nomination.

Brittain also directed the three-part CBC-coproduced series The Champions, chronicling the lives and battles of Canadian political titans René Lévesque and Pierre Elliott Trudeau. His most ambitious project was The King Chronicle, a three-part 1987–88 television series about the remarkable career of Prime Minister William Lyon Mackenzie King.

He won the Gemini Award for best screenplay and direction for the 1985 drama Canada's Sweetheart: The Saga of Hal C. Banks.

As NFB producer, Brittain's credits included Arthur Lipsett's A Trip Down Memory Lane.

Often a narrator of his own documentaries, Brittain also lent his voice to the animated mockumentary What on Earth!

== Lifetime achievement awards and posthumous honours ==
In 1989, Brittain was the recipient of a Margaret Collier Award. In 1990, he was posthumously appointed an Officer of the Order of Canada in recognition of "his masterful visual records of our social and cultural past.

The Donald Brittain Award for the best political or social documentary presented by the Academy of Canadian Cinema and Television at the Gemini Awards and more recently, the Canadian Screen Awards, are named in his honour.

Brittain is interred in Ottawa, Ontario's Beechwood Cemetery.
