= Flight Stop =

Art installation in Toronto

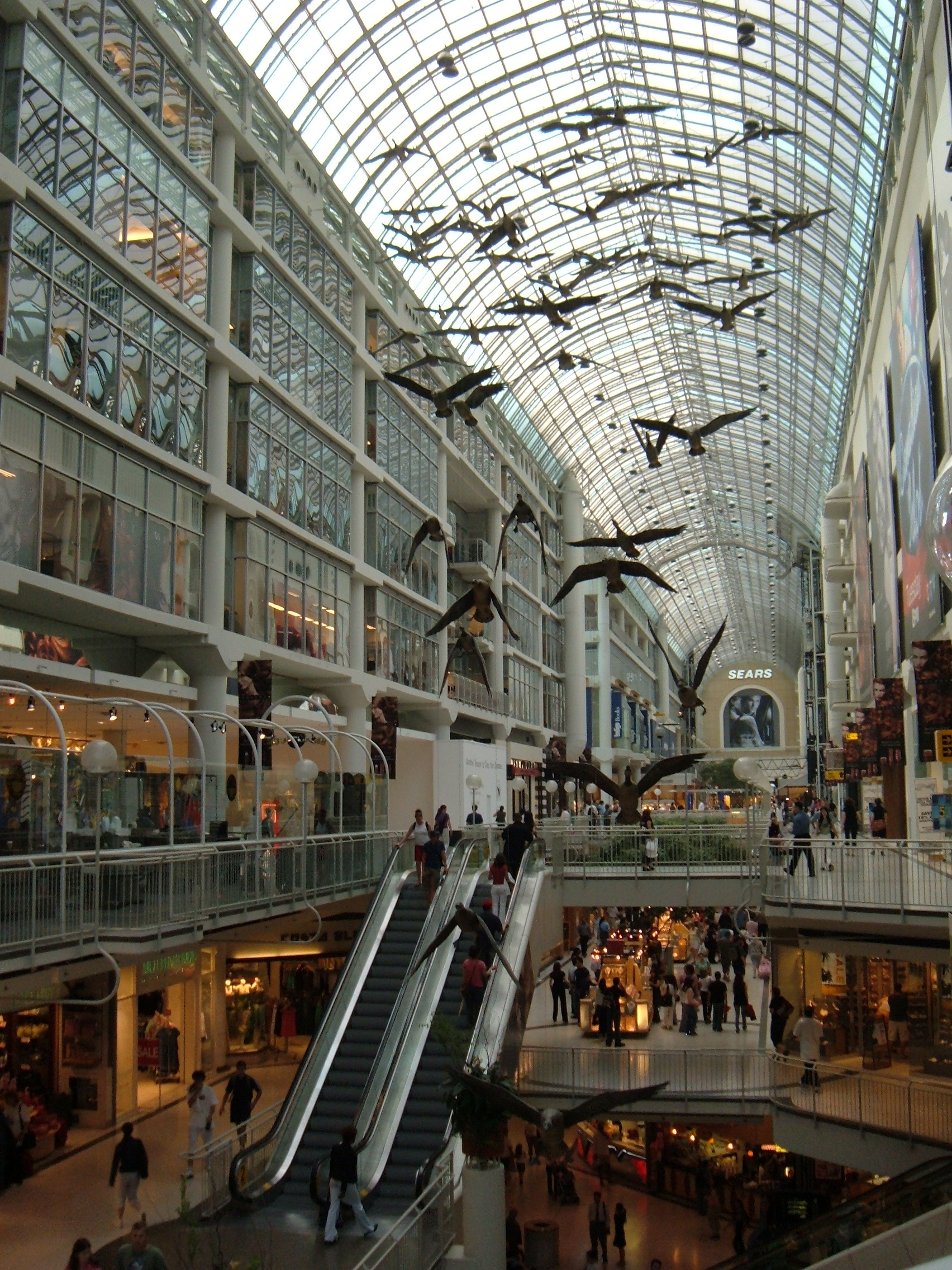
- Interior of the Toronto Eaton Centre showing a view of Flight Stop
- Artist: Michael Snow
- Year: 1979
- Type: Sculpture
- Medium: 60 suspended fibreglass Canada goose forms surfaced with tinted black and white photographs
- Dimensions: 32 x 20 x 16 m
- Location: Toronto, Ontario, Canada; 43.6528°N 79.3802°W

Flight Stop, also titled Flightstop, is a 1979 site-specific art work by Canadian artist Michael Snow. Located in the Toronto Eaton Centre in the downtown core of Toronto, Ontario, Canada, the work hangs from the ceiling and appears to depict sixty Canada geese in flight. Each individual goose is made of styrofoam covered in fibreglass and covered in a sheath made from photographs taken from a single goose. The flock is frozen in mid-flight, "flight stop" being a pun on the nature of still photography. When conceived in 1977, the work was titled Flight Stop but has frequently also been titled Flightstop. The work remains an iconic public art piece in Toronto and in many ways stands as a visual identity for the mall.

== Background ==
Michael Snow exhibited his work internationally from 1957. He used a wide range of media, and he was noted for his innovative use of a variety of technologies. Snow was an experimental filmmaker and a key figure of the structural film movement of the 1960s. His 1967 film Wavelength has been designated and preserved as a masterwork by the Audio-Visual Preservation Trust of Canada and was named number 85 in the 2001 Village Voice critics' list of the 100 Best Films of the 20th Century.

== Development and creation ==
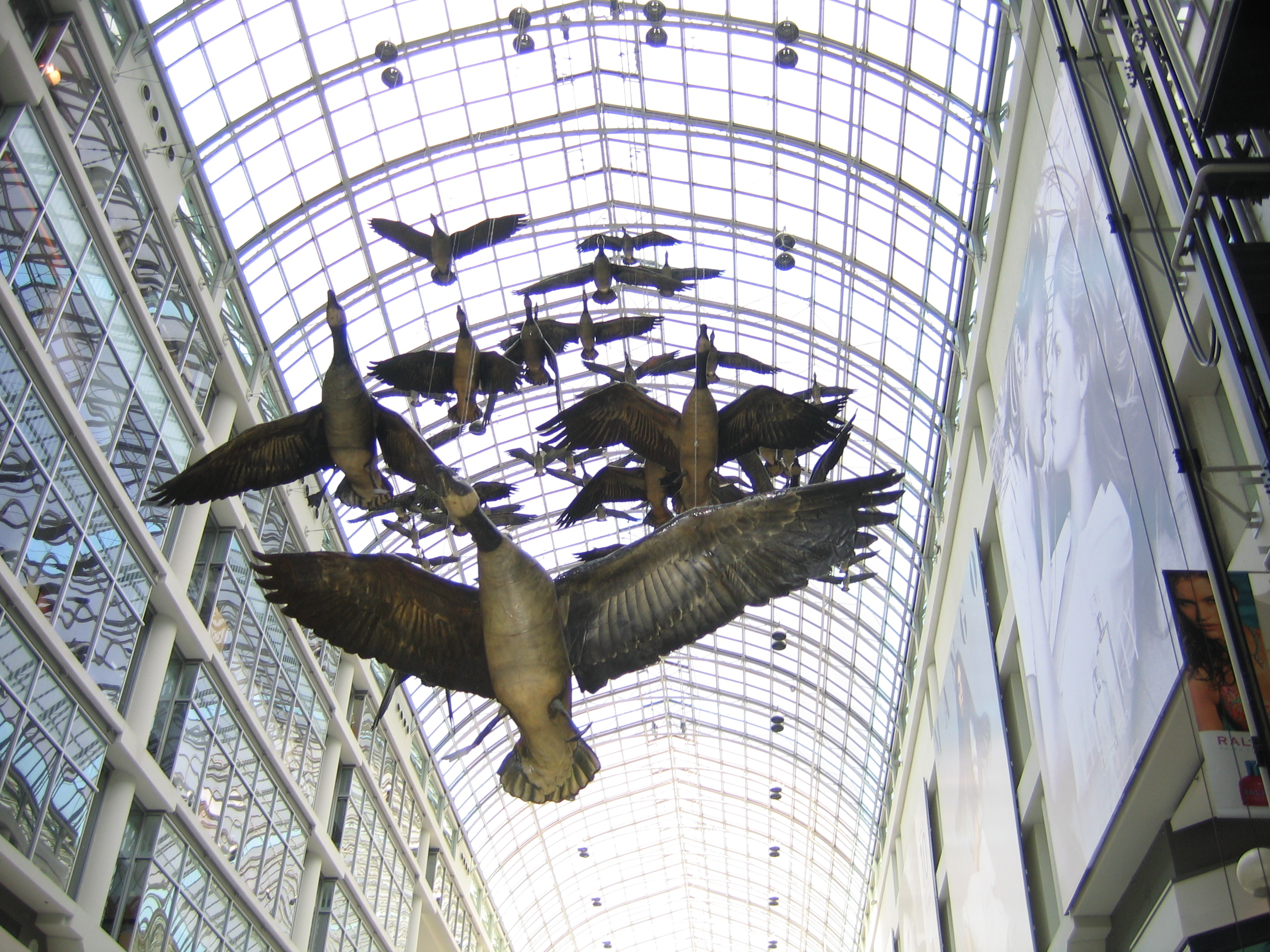
Detail of Flight Stop

Snow was commissioned by the Eaton Centre's developers, Cadillac Fairview, and architect Eberhard Zeidler to provide a permanent art work to hang in a skylit galleria, which would be visible from several levels and balconies as well as from ground-level corridors spanning Dundas and Queen Streets, given that the mall is built on a slope. Snow's original intent was to depict a flight of geese breaking formation as if to land in the mall. Flight Stop appears to be a straightforward representation of sixty geese, but the work is a combination of fibreglass forms and photographs of a single goose, "one of two culled from a flock living on Toronto Island."

Photographing the dead bird, Snow adjusted "the neck, wing, and tail positions and the cylindrical parts of the body". Three different body sizes were then carved in Styrofoam and, "using pattern-making techniques, two-dimensional photographic goose costumes were printed and assembled". The Styrofoam bodies were cast in fibreglass, covered in the photographic sheathes, and varnished in a tinted brown that has yellowed somewhat over time.

Strung from the roof on individual wires, the objects form a dynamic group: the poses lend variety; the play with scale maximizes depth; photographic detail heightens a sense of realism. The objects are somehow more naturalistic—goosier—than conventional sculptural representation could be, and this quality accentuates Snow's artistic comment on the nature of photographic illusion, on the tendency to suspend disbelief.

— Martha Langford, art historian

In Snow's original preparation for the work, the title was given as Flight Stop (and indicated as the "Flight Stop project" in the archival materials). However, in a number of monographs and catalogues, the work is called Flightstop. Now a tourist destination, Flight Stop is one of Snow's most famous and highly visible works, and the work has become iconic for the Toronto Eaton Centre and a part of the visual identity of the mall.

== Legal issues ==
During the Christmas season of 1981, the Eaton Centre placed red ribbons around the necks of the geese. Snow brought an action against the Centre to get an injunction to have the ribbons removed. In the landmark case Snow v Eaton Centre Ltd, the Ontario High Court of Justice affirmed the artist's right to the integrity of their work. The operator of the Toronto Eaton Centre was found liable for violating Snow's moral rights. The judgement in Snow's favour held that the sculpture's integrity was "distorted, mutilated or otherwise modified" which was "to the prejudice of the honour or reputation of the author" contrary to section 28.2 of the Copyright Act. The opinion was based both on the opinion of Snow as well as the testimony of experts in the art community.

== Legacy ==
Snow's position as a Canadian artist with an international profile was established well before 1979. Flight Stop established Snow as a highly visible artist in Canada, a rare feat in that country. As a work of public art, Flight Stop is not only highly visible but has become iconic for the Eaton Centre and Toronto as a whole.

== See also ==
- List of Canadian lower court cases

== Works cited ==
- Landau, Emily. "The Amazing Adventures of Michael Snow: an uncensored history of Toronto's most notorious art star". Toronto Life (March 27, 2013).
- Langford, Martha. Michael Snow: Life & Work. Toronto: Art Canada Institute, 2004. ISBN 978-1-4871-0006-3
- Panetta, Simona. "Michael Snow: The Transformer." City Life Magazine (December 5, 2012).
- Sandals, Leah. "Déja Viewed: Michael Snow on Looking Back, and Ahead". Canadian Art (September 20, 2016).
- Snow, Michael Michael Snow: Almost Cover to Cover. London: Black Dog Publishing. 2001. ISBN 190103318X
- Snow, Michael, Philip Monk, Louise Dompierre and Dennis Reid. The Michael Snow Project. Visual Art, 1951–1993. Toronto: A.A. Knopf Canada, 1994. ISBN 0394280539
