= List of Canadian courts of appeal cases =

A select number of decisions from the courts of appeal have proven to be the leading case law in a number of fields and have subsequently been adopted across all provinces, or else they are famous decisions in their own right. Most frequently the decisions were never appealed or were denied leave to the Supreme Court of Canada. The notable decisions of these courts are listed in chronological order by province.

== Federal Court of Appeal ==
- Tele-Direct (Publications) Inc. v. American Business Informations Inc. (1997) 76 CPR (3d) 296
- Englander v. Telus Communications Inc., 2004 FCA 387 - privacy, PIPEDA
- BMG Canada Inc. v. Doe, 2005 FCA 193 - privacy rights of filesharers
- Hinzman v. Canada (2006) - refugee protection for deserters of a war that began without UN approval
- Church of Atheism of Central Canada v Canada (National Revenue)

== British Columbia Court of Appeal ==
- Vancouver Rape Relief Society v. Nixon, 2005 BCCA 601 - protection of women's equality right to determine membership in equality-seeking organization

== Court of Appeal for Ontario ==
- Tilden Rent-A-Car Co. v. Clendenning (1978), 83 DLR (3d) 400, 18 OR (2d) 601 (Ont CA) - contracts of adhesion
- R. v. Buzzanga and Durocher (1979), 25 OR (2d) 705 (CA) - criminal culpability
- Blainey v. Ontario Hockey Association (1986), 14 OAC 194 - Human Rights
- Zylberberg v. Sudbury Board of Education, (1988)
- R. v. Church of Scientology of Toronto (1996), 33 OR (3d) 65, 116 CCC (3d) 1
- R. v. Pintar, (1996), 2 CR (5th) 151 (Ont CA)
- Gould Estate v. Stoddart Publishing Co. Ltd. (1998), 39 OR 555, 161 DLR (4th) 321 - copyright
- General Accident Assurance Co. v. Chrusz (1999), 180 DLR (4th) 241 (Ont CA) - solicitor client privilege
- Chippewas of Sarnia Band v. Canada (Attorney General) (2000), 51 OR (3d) 641, 195 DLR (4th) 135 (Ont CA) - aboriginal title
- Halpern v. Canada (Attorney General), [2003] OJ No 2268 - same sex marriage
- Hitzig v. Canada (2003) 231 DLR (4th) 104, 177 CCC (3d) 449
- Freeman-Maloy v. Marsden (2006), 79 OR (3d) 401, 267 DLR (4th) 37
- Indalex Limited (Re), 2011 ONCA 265 - priority of claims of pension fund in a company bankruptcy; leave to appeal granted by the Supreme Court of Canada, December 1, 2011.
- Bedford v. Canada, 2012 ONCA 186 - challenge of prostitution laws under the Charter

== See also ==
- List of Supreme Court of Canada cases
- List of notable Canadian lower court cases
- List of Vancouver court cases
