= List of Canadian lower court cases =

A select number of decisions from the superior and inferior courts that have proven to be the leading case law in a number of fields and have subsequently been influential in other provinces, or else they are famous decisions in their own right. These include trial court cases. Typically, these decisions were merely affirmed at the appellate level or were never appealed. Other cases were appeals to courts besides the provincial Court of Appeal or the Supreme Court of Canada. The decisions are listed in chronological order.

- Abortion trial of Emily Stowe (1879)
- R. v. Jim (1915) : Aboriginal hunting rights
- Canadian Admiral Corporation Ltd. v. Rediffusion Inc., [1954] Ex. CR 382, 20 CPR 75: copyright
- Teck Corp. Ltd. v. Millar (1972), 33 DLR (3d) 288 : Director liability
- Bettel v. Yim (1978), 20 OR (2d) 617 (Co. Ct.): torts
- Snow v. Eaton Centre Ltd. (1982) 70 C.P.R. (2d) 105: moral rights
- Jane Doe v. Board of Commissioners of Police for the Municipality of Metropolitan Toronto (1989), 58 D.L.R. (4th) 396, 48 C.C.L.T. 105 (H.C.J.), aff'd (1990), 74 O.R. (2d) 225, 72 D.L.R. (4th) 580 (Div. Ct.), leave to appeal refused (1991) 1 O.R. (3d) 416 (C.A.): right to sue police force in negligence for failure to warn
- R. v. Glad Day Bookshops Inc. (1993): freedom of expression
- Prise de Parole Inc v Guérin, Éditeur Ltée (1995), 104 FTR 104: moral rights
- Jane Doe v. Board of Commissioners of Police for the Municipality of Metropolitan Toronto (1998), 39 O.R. (3d) 487, 160 D.L.R. (4th) 697, 43 C.C.L.T. (2d) 123 (Gen. Div.): damage award against police force for failure to warn
- R. v. Gillian Guess (1998), : only case in Canadian history where jury room discussions were made part of the public record.
- Rudder v. Microsoft Corp. (1999): clickwrap licenses
- Kanitz v. Rogers Cable Inc., [2002] O.J. No. 665
- O'Donohue v. Canada, [2003] CanLII 41404 (Ont. S.C.)
- Lund v. Boissoin, 2009 ACQB 592
- Bedford v. Canada, 2010 Ontario Superior Court of Justice case which declared prohibition of streetwalking as well as brothels unconstitutional

== See also ==
- List of notable Canadian Courts of Appeals cases
- List of Supreme Court of Canada cases
- List of Vancouver court cases
