= Cityscape (2019 film) =

2019 film

- Directed by: Michael Snow
- Produced by: Janine Marchessault
- Distributed by: IMAX
- Release date: April 18, 2019 (Images)
- Running time: 10 minutes
- Country: Canada

Cityscape is a 2019 Canadian experimental short documentary film, directed by Michael Snow. Described by critics as an "elaboration" on the methods of his 1971 film La Région Centrale, the film depicts the cityscape of downtown Toronto through a rotating camera on the Toronto Islands.

The film was commissioned by IMAX, alongside films by Oliver Husain, Lisa Jackson, Kelly Richardson and Leila Sujir, as part of Outer Worlds, a program of short IMAX films that toured Canada in 2019 to mark the 50th anniversary of the company. The project premiered at the 2019 Images Festival, before touring to Canada's other IMAX theatres in Victoria, Sudbury, Edmonton and Montreal.

In December 2019, the film was named to the Toronto International Film Festival's annual year-end Canada's Top Ten list for short films.
