= Daniel Friedman =

Daniel Friedman(n) may refer to:

- Daniel Fridman (born 1976), Latvian-German chess grandmaster
- Daniel Fridman (rabbi), rabbi of the Jewish Center of Teaneck
- Dan Friedman (graphic designer) (1945–1995), graphic designer and former Yale faculty member
- Daniel Friedman (comedian) (born 1981), South African musical comedian known on stage as Deep Fried Man
- Daniel Mortimer Friedman (1916–2011), judge of the United States Court of Appeals for the Federal Circuit
- Daniel P. Friedman (born 1944), American computer science professor
- Daniel Friedmann (born 1936), Israeli Minister of Justice
- Daniel E. Friedmann (born 1956), CEO of MacDonald, Dettwiler and Associates and author of The Genesis One Code
- Daniel Friedman (author), American author of mystery fiction

== See also ==
- Daniel Freeman (disambiguation)
- Daniel Freedman (disambiguation)
