= Wavelength (1967 film) =

1967 experimental film by Michael Snow

- A still of the loft from Wavelength
- Directed by: Michael Snow
- Written by: Michael Snow
- Starring: Hollis Frampton; Roswell Rudd; Amy Taubin; Joyce Wieland
- Cinematography: Michael Snow
- Edited by: Michael Snow
- Music by: Ted Wolff
- Release date: 1967
- Running time: 45 minutes
- Countries: Canada; United States
- Language: English

Wavelength is a 1967 experimental film by Canadian artist Michael Snow. Shot from a fixed camera angle, it depicts a loft space with an extended zoom over the duration of the film.

When making Wavelength, Snow had limited experience in film and was primarily known for his prior work in painting and sculpture. He shot the film in December 1966 over the course of a week, casting friends of his to appear in its brief narrative events. He experimented with mixed film stocks and other techniques that produced changes in the image's appearance. The film's soundtrack combines synchronized sound with sinusoidal output from an audio oscillator, which increases in pitch until the end of the film.

Snow designed the original version of Wavelength for a limited release and first showed it at a private screening in May 1967. He submitted it to the 1967 Knokke-Le-Zoute Experimental Film Festival in Belgium, where it won the Grand Prix. Critics emphasized the film's presentation of continuous space and time during a period when experimental cinema was associated with rapid, fragmented editing. P. Adams Sitney identified it as a touchstone within the nascent structural film movement, and Scott MacDonald has recognized it as a landmark of avant-garde cinema.

Snow went on to create a trilogy of "camera motion" films, which included the later films Back and Forth (1969) and La Région Centrale (1971). He revisited Wavelength in several of his later works, and it has served as an inspiration for other minimalist filmmakers and artists.

== Background ==
By the time he made Wavelength, Michael Snow had limited experience as a filmmaker and was best known as an established artist working in painting and sculpture. Snow studied design at the Ontario College of Art, where he trained as a painter. During the mid-1950s, he worked briefly for George Dunning's studio Graphic Associates in Toronto. There, he created his first film, the short animation A to Z, in which pieces of furniture make love.

Snow's photographic series Four to Five (1962), made shortly before his move to New York, was the beginning of his Walking Woman works. These used a cropped graphic of a walking woman and reproduced it in a wide variety of media, materials, and settings. Snow produced an estimated 200 individual Walking Woman works plus an additional 800 non-gallery works. His first avant-garde film, New York Eye and Ear Control (1964), was an entry in this series. In many of his works during this period, Snow began to employ serialization with variations. Influenced by film and camera work, he also exhibited a pronounced interest in framing.

== Synopsis ==
The entire film is set inside a loft featuring four mullioned windows and minimal furnishings—a desk, a yellow chair, and a radiator against the far wall, with several photographs hanging above the chair. The film begins with a wide shot of the loft, and the image gradually zooms in on the wall as the story progresses. A woman in a red coat directs two men to place a bookcase against the left wall, after which they leave. Later, she returns to the loft with another woman. One of them turns on the radio, and the image takes on a pinkish hue as the women drink beverages and listen to "Strawberry Fields Forever" by the Beatles before abruptly leaving. The scene briefly cuts to a solid red screen, accompanied by a low-pitched hum that gradually increases in pitch until the end of the film. When the image of the loft returns, the film introduces a variety of alterations to the image. The loft is presented as a negative image, in monochrome colour schemes, or with extreme light levels that white out the screen.

The sound of breaking glass is heard before a man staggers into the loft and collapses on the floor, dying. As the zoom progresses, his corpse is eventually cut out of the frame. After some time, a woman arrives and makes a phone call to a man named Richard. She informs him about the dead body she has discovered and agrees to wait outside. Once she leaves, silent images of her previous actions are superimposed on the screen. The camera continues to zoom in on the photographs hanging on the wall, two of which depict Walking Woman figures and another showing waves. The hum on the soundtrack, now very high-pitched, becomes unstable and begins to resemble the sound of a siren. The photograph of the waves is enlarged until it fills the entire frame. The film concludes as the photograph goes out of focus and the image fades to white.

== Cast ==
- Amy Taubin
- Hollis Frampton
- Joyce Wieland
- Lynn Grossman
- Naoto Nakagawa
- Roswell Rudd

== Production ==
=== Pre-production ===
Snow's production notes for Wavelength show variations on the concept of an extended zoom that moves from a wide shot to a close-up. The film emerged from an exercise playing with combinations of words, clustered around "room", "wave", "length", "Atlantic", "time", and "ocean". Snow's ideas for the final close-up included a photograph of a "beautiful blond white nude girl", a window, a picture of Billie Holiday, a Tom Wesselmann painting, a photograph of a child, or a calendar featuring an autumn landscape. Snow settled on a photograph he had taken of the East River, part of a series made for his sculpture Atlantic. He selected the image for its calm and undramatic qualities.

Snow cast the film from his circle of friends. He selected Amy Taubin because of her previous acting experience in a Broadway adaptation of The Prime of Miss Jean Brodie. His notes for her scene included the idea to ask Taubin to masturbate. Filmmaker Hollis Frampton volunteered to appear in the film after Snow asked for "somebody to die for me".

Snow spent a year preparing notes and looking for a space to film. To prepare the loft for filming, he placed the photograph of the East River on the far wall of the room. Above it, he attached a pair of photographs of women walking, along with two Walking Woman silhouettes. The inclusion of the Walking Woman in Wavelength marked the end of the series.

=== Filming ===
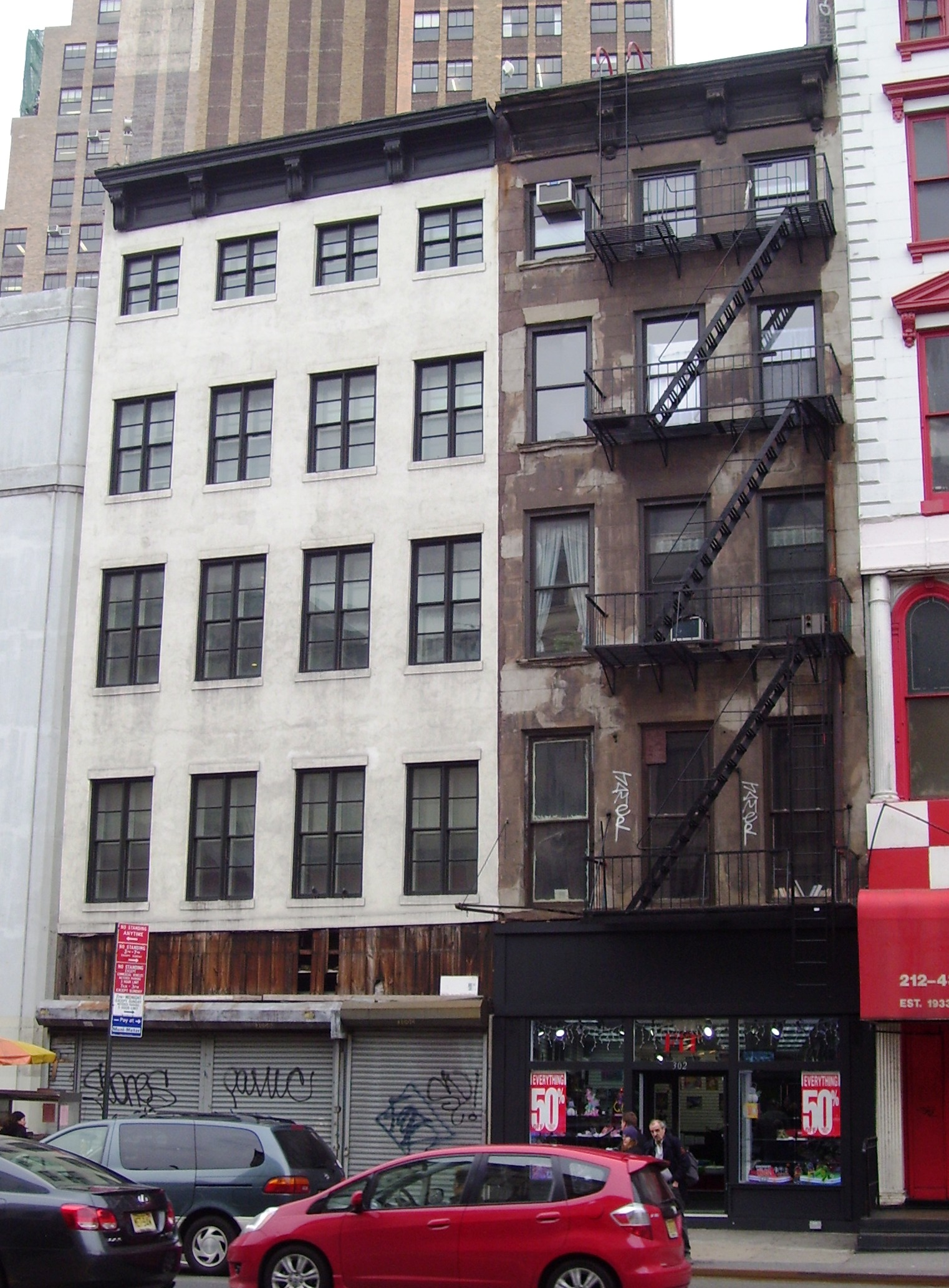
Wavelength was filmed at 300 Canal Street (left, pictured in 2012).

Wavelength was shot in a loft on Canal Street over the course of a week in December 1966. Snow borrowed a Bolex 16 mm camera and Angénieux zoom lens from filmmaker Ken Jacobs. He mounted it on a high platform from which it could capture more of the street scenes outside. The distance from the camera to the opposite end of the room was around 80 feet (24 m).

Because the camera could only record 3 minutes of footage before needing to be reloaded, Snow divided the film's runtime into about 18 segments and marked the positions of the zoom lens for the start and end of each segment. The scenes were shot out of order, with Frampton's death scene recorded first to accommodate his schedule. For the final scenes showing the wave photograph, Snow had to physically move the camera from its original position, having reached the limitations of the zoom lens.

He shot on multiple types of film stock to produce changes in the light and grain in the image. These included Kodachrome, Ektachrome, Kodak colour negative, Agfachrome colour reversal, DuPont black-and-white reversal, and Ansco stocks. Snow experimented with expired film, as well as film intended for outdoor lighting. Additional changes to the colouration were achieved by shooting during both day and night conditions, and by using colour gels or photographic filters.

=== Soundtrack ===
For the film's soundtrack, Snow initially considered increasing the volume in an extended crescendo. After deciding a glissando would be more suitable, he developed plans to record it on a trombone or violin and mix together multiple takes to fill the duration of the film. Ted Wolff, who worked at Bell Labs, was interested in the project and suggested using the pure tone of a sine wave produced by an audio oscillator. Wolff worked with Snow to build a motor that controlled the oscillator.

Snow had intended to make use of whatever sync sound was recorded during filming but made an exception for the music on the radio. During the original shoot, Joan Baez's cover of "The Little Drummer Boy" was playing. Feeling it did not fit well in the film, Snow replaced it with "Strawberry Fields Forever", which had just been released when he was editing the film. Snow initially mixed the soundtrack such that the sync sound was on the film's optical soundtrack and the electronic glissando was on a separate reel-to-reel tape. This would give him the ability to adjust the tape playback based on the acoustics of each screening venue.

== Structure and analysis ==
The primary structure of Wavelength is defined by its zoom. Over the course of the film, the angle of view narrows, making the far wall appear closer and closer. This experience cannot be recreated with the human eye and is unique to the mechanical eye. Annette Michelson proposed that Snow's use of the zoom "produces the formal correlative of the suspense film."

Snow expressed that he sought to create in Wavelength "a balancing of 'illusion' and 'fact'". Its soundtrack combines a representational component, the diegetic sound of on-screen events and ambient noise, with an abstract component, the electronic sine. Images of movement are often balanced with changes in how the viewer perceives the room. The entry of the dying man is preceded by fluctuations in the colour of the image. The scene of the woman making a phone call is shown twice, the second time through a superimposition over the continuing zoom.

== Release ==
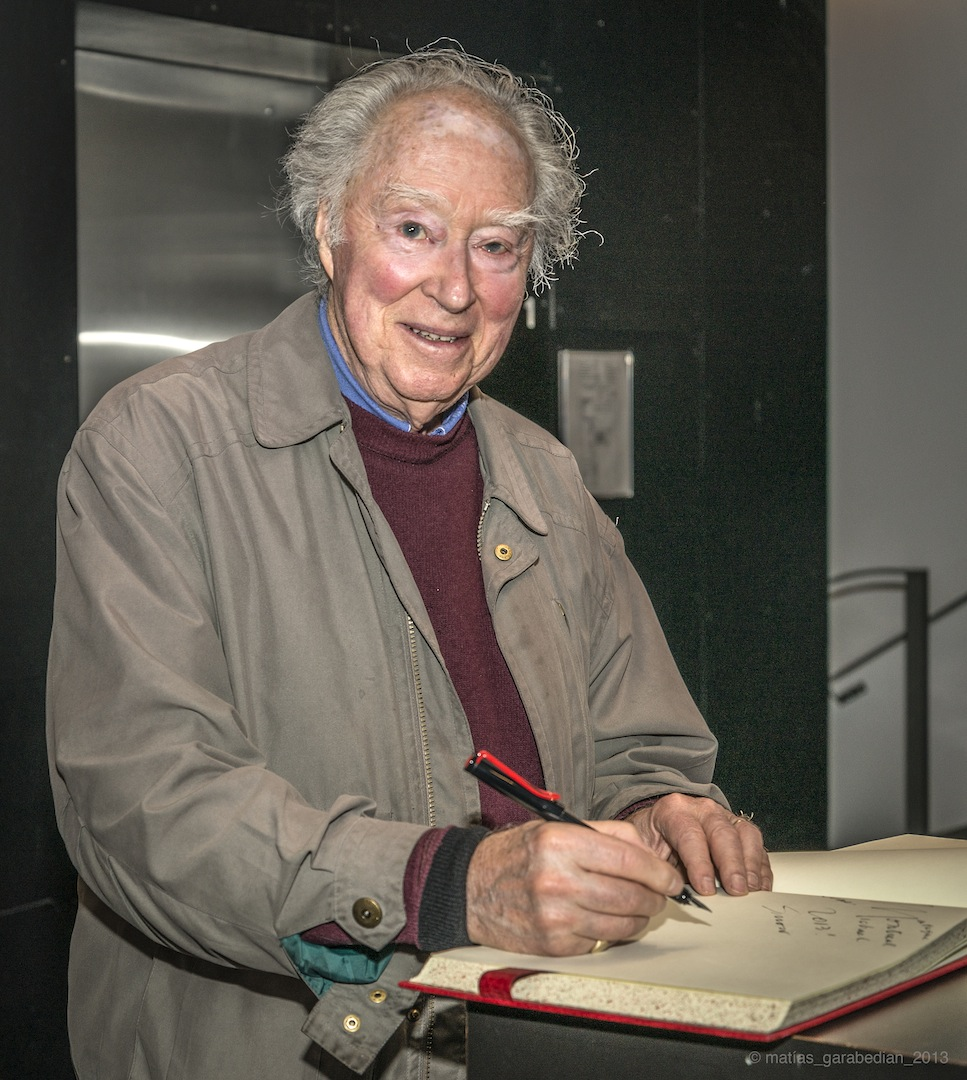
Director Michael Snow (pictured in 2013)

Wavelength was first shown in May 1967, at a private screening at the Film-Maker's Cinematheque attended by Shirley Clarke, Richard Foreman, Ken Jacobs, George Kuchar, Jonas Mekas, Nam June Paik, and Amy Taubin. Mekas recommended submitting the film to the Knokke-Le-Zoute Experimental Film Festival in Belgium. However, Snow expected the separately recorded soundtrack to prove challenging for wider exhibition and decided it would be better to transfer the score to the film's optical track. Since Snow lacked funds to finish the film, Mekas secured the money to create the print.

After the festival, Wavelength had its U.S. premiere in January 1968 in the first public screening at the Film-Makers' Cinematheque's new location in SoHo, as part of a program with Kusama's Self-Obliteration by Jud Yalkut and Shaman: A Tapestry for Sorcerers by Storm de Hirsch. Snow submitted it to the New York Film Festival but was rejected. Artist Richard Serra brought a copy of the film while traveling across Europe, exhibiting it a dozen times. When he screened it at the Stedelijk Museum in Amsterdam, a group of enraged audience members knocked over the projector.

Snow did not release Wavelength for home media, preferring that it be screened on film in a cinema. In discussing the shortcomings of digital projection, Taubin emphasized the importance of presenting the various film grains of Wavelength and the difference in "visual cues through which we read space". As of 2024, a restoration of the 16 mm print is being overseen by John Klacsmann, archivist at Anthology Film Archives.

== Critical reception ==
The screening of Wavelength in 1967 was, according to filmmaker Jonas Mekas, "a landmark event in cinema." The film won the Grand Prix at the 1967 Knokke-Le-Zoute Experimental Film Festival in Knokke, Belgium. Film Culture magazine presented Snow its 1967 Independent Film Award. Theorists praised the film for its close attention to framing, visual detail, and colour, and it was viewed as one of the most innovatory works within avant-garde cinema.

In a 1968 Film Quarterly review, Jud Yalkut called Wavelength "at once one of the simplest and one of the most complex films ever conceived." The Village Voice reviewer James Stoller noted, "The things to be said against such a film are obvious, known, and quite unarguable…What's at least more surprising is the somewhat mystical power that apparently still resides in the idea or image of a movie camera fixed pedantically upon a barely changing scene, with the special integrity of space and time that no or minimal cutting permits." In a 1968 L.A. Free Press review of the film, Gene Youngblood described Wavelength as "without precedent in the purity of its confrontation with the essence of cinema: the relationships between illusion and fact, space and time, subject and object. It is the first post-Warhol, post-Minimal movie; one of the few films to engage those higher conceptual orders which occupy modern painting and sculpture. It has rightly been described as a 'triumph of contemplative cinema.'" In a 1969 review of the film published in Artforum, Manny Farber described Wavelength as "a singularly unpadded, uncomplicated, deadly realistic way to film three walls, a ceiling and a floor... it is probably the most rigorously composed movie in existence."

In his 1969 article "Structural Film", film historian P. Adams Sitney identified a shift within avant-garde cinema away from complex forms and toward "a cinema of structure wherein the shape of the whole film is predetermined and simplified, and it is that shape which is the primal impression of the film." Analyzing the emerging structural film movement, Sitney called Snow "the dean of structural filmmakers" and highlighted Wavelength for its use of a fixed camera position in defining the shape of the work. Where Sitney describes structural film as a "working process", Malcolm Le Grice found the film's approach to durational equivalence "seriously wanting", in that the "implied…narrative [makes Wavelength] in some ways a retrograde step in cinematic form". To Stephen Heath, the principal theme of Wavelength was the "question of the cinematic institution of the subject of film" rather than the apparatus of filmmaking itself.

In her 1971 essay "Toward Snow", published in Artforum, Annette Michelson hailed the film as "a masterwork, a claim hardly to be seriously contended at this point in film history". She described experimental cinema prior to Wavelength as being defined by fragmented, non-narrative forms marked by the use of fast editing, layered superimpositions, and gestural hand-held shooting. For Michelson, the film established a "spatio-temporal continuity" and reintroduced "expectation as the core of film form". The essay has become a foundational text in criticism of Wavelength, and it led to Michelson editing an issue dedicated to time-based film works previously considered outside the magazine's purview.

== Legacy ==
Considered a canonical avant-garde film, Wavelength's 45-minute running time nevertheless contributes to a reputation for being a difficult work:

[G]iven the film's durational strategy, we feel every minute of the time it takes to traverse the space of the loft to get to the infinite space of the photograph of waves—and the fade to white—at the film's end. The film inspires as much boredom and frustration as intrigue and epiphany....

Wavelength is part of Anthology Film Archives' Essential Cinema Repertory collection. The film ranked 196th in the 2022 Sight & Sound critics' poll of the greatest films ever made, and also received five directors' votes. It was named #85 in the 2001 Village Voice critics' list of the Best Films of the Century. The Toronto International Film Festival's experimental film section Wavelengths, created by programmer Susan Oxtoby in 2001, takes its name from the film.

=== Related works ===
Wavelength established a template for many of Snow's later films, which critic J. Hoberman characterizes as "anti-illusionist, reflexive, and often paradoxical investigations of cinema's unique, irreducible properties." Snow has grouped it with Back and Forth, also known as <--->, and La Région Centrale as a trilogy of "camera motion" films. His photographic slide installation Slidelength features images from Wavelength and other related images. He juxtaposes these with objects, such as filters and gels, used in Wavelength's production. His 1976 Breakfast (Table Top Dolly) is a parody of Wavelength, in which a single tracking shot across a breakfast table shows the contents being physically displaced by the camera.

In 2003, Snow released WVLNT (or Wavelength for Those Who Don't Have the Time), a shorter and significantly altered version, on DVD. WVLNT transforms the original film by breaking it into three 15-minute segments that are superimposed. Snow's treatment is satirical, condensing the original "for the viewer who inevitably is in a hurry because all the world's info is pressing to be seen."

=== Influence ===
Wavelength was an early influence on minimalist composer Steve Reich, and his 1970 recording of Four Organs uses the film's closing photograph for its cover artwork. Filmmaker Don Owen, who viewed the film as "a meditation on death", cited it as an influence on his work. Anthony McCall has detailed how descriptions of Wavelength inspired the development of his 1973 work Line Describing a Cone, pointing to "the possibility that a single idea can define the essential outline of an entire film."

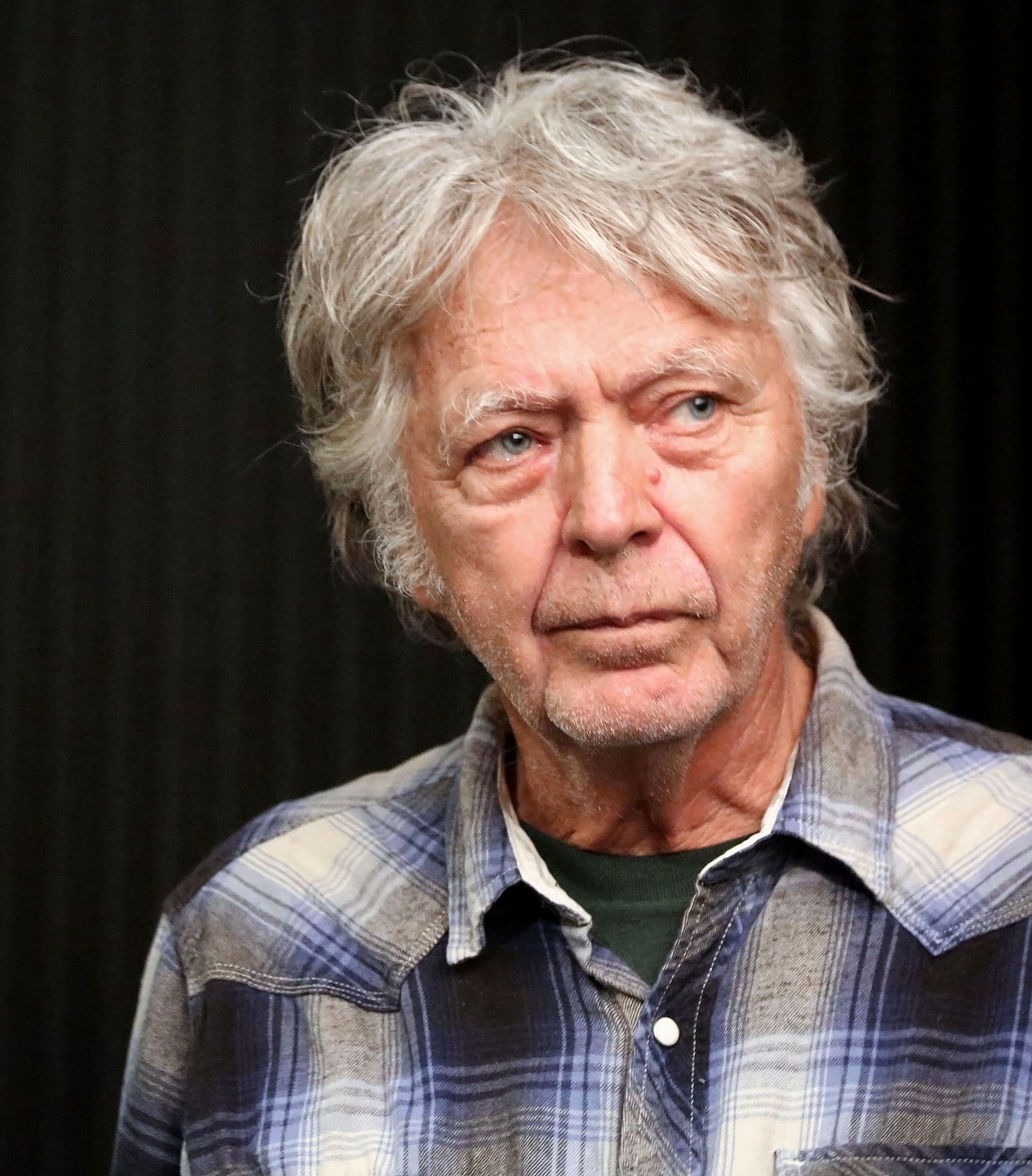
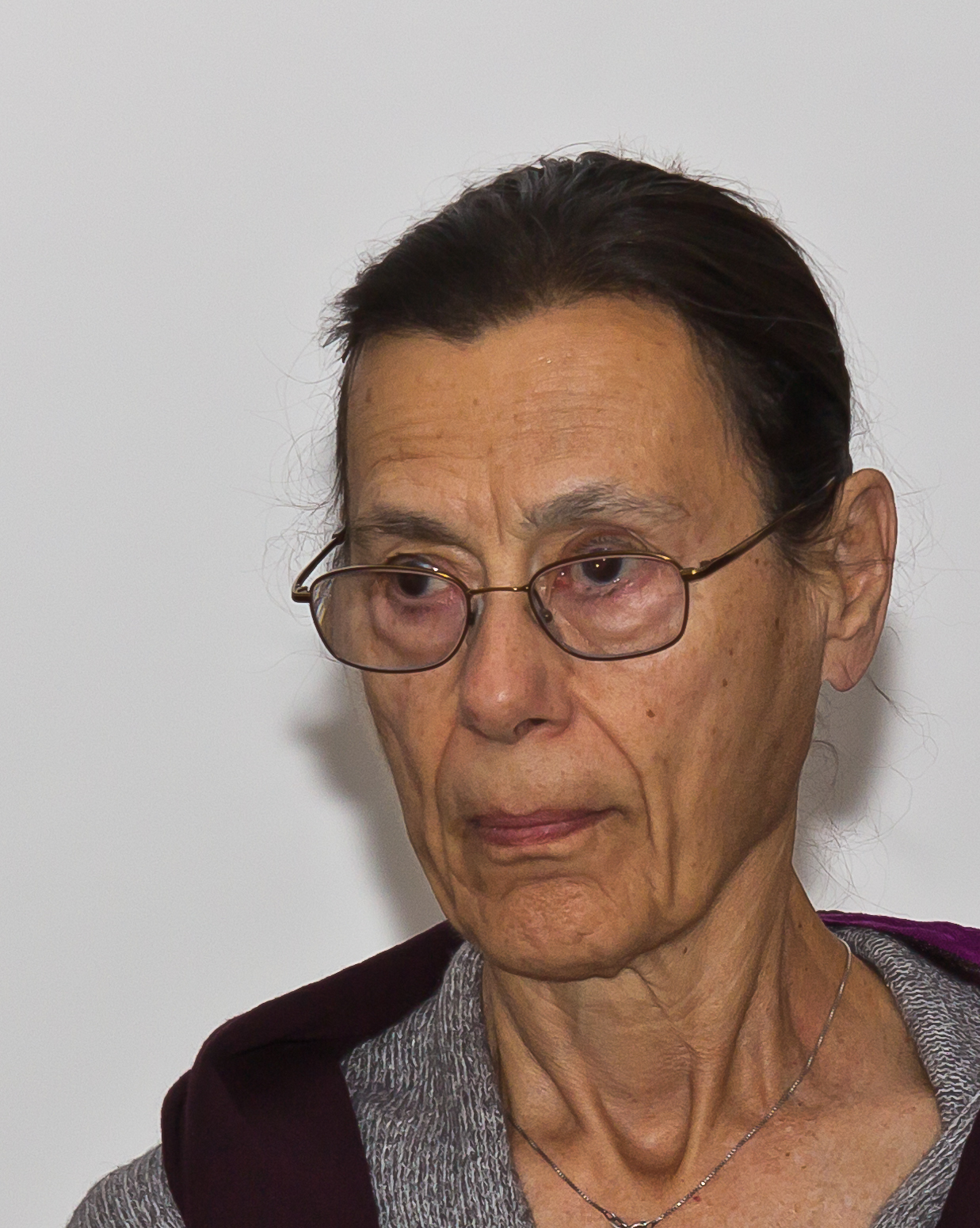
Excerpts of Wavelength have appeared in works by James Benning (left) and Yvonne Rainer (right).

James Benning's 1978 film Grand Opera makes explicit reference to Wavelength. The film opens with a black leader accompanied by a reworking of Amy Taubin's phone call about discovering a dead body. In 2015, Benning created a remake of Wavelength from two stills of the original film. His version uses digital effects to create a perfectly smooth, continuous zoom between the start and end points.

Yvonne Rainer used an excerpt of Wavelength in her 1985 film The Man Who Envied Women. In it, the loft serves as an example of the sort of spaces to which artists had access prior to the gentrification of New York. Helena Wittmann quoted Wavelength in her 2017 drama film Drift, whose final shot is a slow zoom toward a picture of ocean waves until it eventually fills the frame.

== Bibliography ==
- Cornwell, Regina (1980). Snow Seen: The Films and Photographs of Michael Snow. PMA Books. ISBN 978-0-88778-197-1 – via Internet Archive.
- Dixon, Wheeler Winston; Foster, Gwendolyn Audrey, eds. (2002). Experimental Cinema, the Film Reader. Routledge. ISBN 978-0-415-27787-7.
- Hartog, Simon (1978). "Ten Questions to Michael Snow". In Gidal, Peter (ed.). Structural Film Anthology. British Film Institute. ISBN 978-0-85170-053-3.
- Heath, Stephen (1981). Questions of Cinema. Indiana University Press. ISBN 978-0-253-15914-4.
- Hoberman, J. (2025). Everything Is Now: The 1960s New York Avant-Garde—Primal Happenings, Underground Movies, Radical Pop. Verso Books. ISBN 978-1-80429-086-6.
- Kunz, Martin, ed. (1979). Michael Snow. Kunstmuseum Luzern. ISBN 978-3-267-00001-3.
- Langford, Martha (2014). Michael Snow: Life & Work. Art Canada Institute. ISBN 978-1-4871-0004-9.
- Legge, Elizabeth (2009). Michael Snow: Wavelength. Afterall. ISBN 978-1-84638-055-6.
- MacDonald, Scott (1992). A Critical Cinema 2: Interviews with Independent Filmmakers. University of California Press. ISBN 978-0-520-05800-2.
- MacDonald, Scott (2019). The Sublimity of Document: Cinema as Diorama. Oxford University Press. ISBN 978-0-19-005212-6.
- Monk, Philip (1994). "Around Wavelength". The Michael Snow Project: Visual Art, 1951–1993. Alfred A. Knopf. ISBN 978-0-394-28053-0 – via Internet Archive.
- O'Brien, Kerry (2023). On Minimalism: Documenting a Musical Movement. University of California Press. ISBN 978-0-520-38207-7.
- Sitney, P. Adams (1979). Visionary Film: The American Avant-Garde 1943–1978. Oxford University Press. ISBN 978-0-19-502486-9.
- Turim, Maureen Cheryn (1985). Abstraction in Avant-Garde Films. UMI Research Press. ISBN 978-0-8357-1629-1.
- Wees, William C. (1992). Light Moving in Time. Berkeley: University of California Press. ISBN 978-0-520-07367-8.
