= Daniel Freeman (disambiguation) =

Daniel Freeman may refer to:

- Daniel Freeman (1826–1908), an American homesteader and Civil War veteran
- Daniel Freeman (Los Angeles County) (1837–1918), American farmer and land developer
- Daniel E. Freeman (born 1959), American musicologist
- Daniel Freeman (psychologist), British psychologist

== See also ==
- Daniel Freedman (disambiguation)
- Daniel Friedman (disambiguation)
- Daniel Freeman Hospital, California
- Freeman-Maloy v Marsden
