= Bettel =

Bettel may refer to:

- Bettel, Luxembourg, a village in the commune of Tandel
- Bettel (cards), a bid to take no tricks in certain card games
- Bettel v Yim, a 1978 Canadian tort case
- Xavier Bettel (born 1973), Luxembourgish politician and lawyer
- Tania Bettel, Luxembourgish cyclist who won the 1992 women's National Championship
- Michael Bettel (died 2003), British drummer for the band Tank
