= Snow v Eaton Centre Ltd =

1982 Canadian copyright case

Snow v. Eaton Centre Ltd.
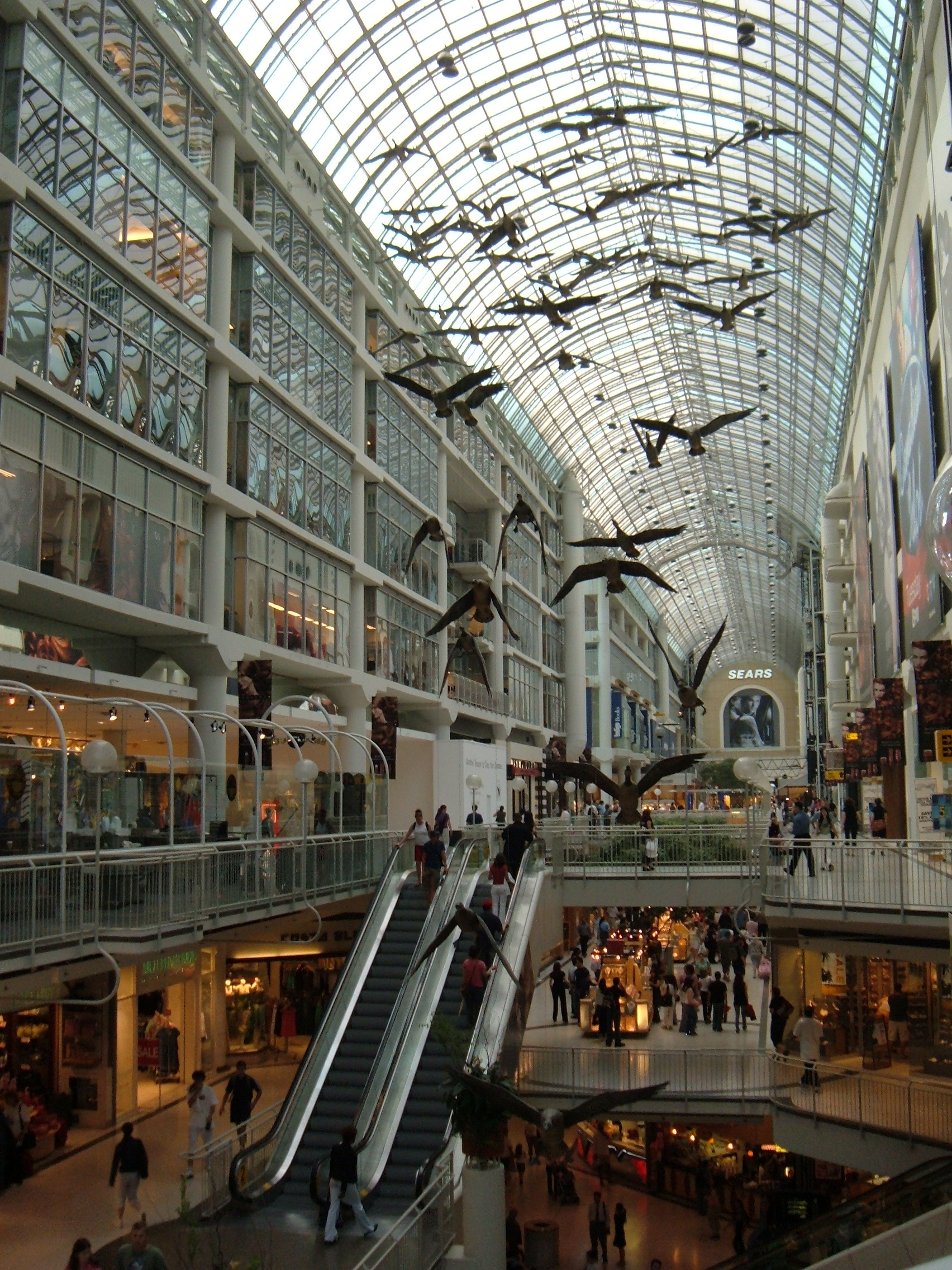
- Flight Stop, the sculpture under dispute at the Eaton Centre
- Court: Ontario High Court of Justice
- Decided: 1982-12-08
- Citation: 70 CPR (2d) 105, [1982] OJ No 3645

Case opinions
- Decision by: O'Brien J.

Keywords
- copyright, moral rights

Snow v. Eaton Centre Ltd. is a leading Canadian decision on moral rights. The Ontario High Court of Justice affirmed the artist's right to integrity of their work. The operator of the Toronto Eaton Centre was found liable for violating Michael Snow's moral rights by putting Christmas bows on his work Flight Stop.

== Background ==
Michael Snow was commissioned to do a sculpture called Flight Stop consisting of a number of Canada geese in flight in the atrium of the Toronto Eaton Centre. During the Christmas season of 1981, the Eaton Centre placed red ribbons around the necks of the geese. Snow brought an action against the Centre to get an injunction to have the ribbons removed. He had argued that the ribbons offended the integrity of, and distorted, his work.

== Judgment ==
The judge agreed with Snow. He held that the sculpture's integrity was "distorted, mutilated or otherwise modified" which was "to the prejudice of the honour or reputation of the author" contrary to section 28.2 of the Copyright Act. The opinion was based both on the opinion of Snow as well as the testimony of experts in the art community.

== Aftermath ==
Subsequent to this case, the standard for moral rights infringement has been raised by the requirement for more objective evidence of prejudice and harm. Evidence from other respected artists and people knowledgeable in the field is required to prove prejudice to honour or reputation.

The Copyright Act of Canada has also been amended since this case so that any modification to a painting, sculpture or engraving is deemed to prejudice the author. For those types of works, no evidence of actual prejudice is required.

== See also ==
- Prise de Parole Inc v Guérin, Éditeur Ltée
- List of notable Canadian lower court cases
