= Jonathan Rosenbaum =

American film critic (born 1943)

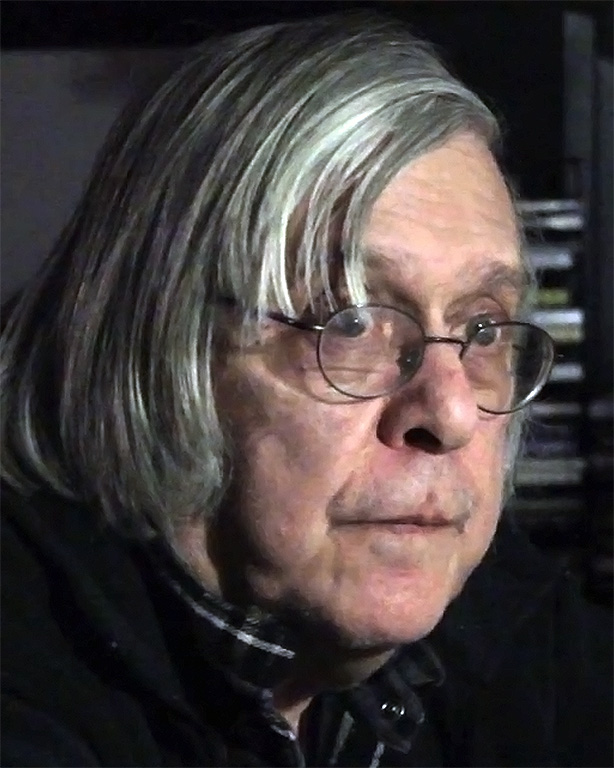
- Rosenbaum in 2013
- Born: February 27, 1943 (age 83); Florence, Alabama, U.S.
- Education: Bard College
- Occupations: Film critic; essayist; author
- Writing career
- Period: 1969–present
- Website: jonathanrosenbaum.net

Jonathan Rosenbaum (born February 27, 1943) is an American film critic and author. Rosenbaum was the head film critic for The Chicago Reader from 1987 to 2008. He has published and edited numerous books about cinema and has contributed to such notable film publications as Cahiers du cinéma and Film Comment.

Regarding Rosenbaum, French New Wave director Jean-Luc Godard said, "I think there is a very good film critic in the United States today, a successor of James Agee, and that is Jonathan Rosenbaum. He's one of the best; we don't have writers like him in France today. He's like André Bazin."

== Early life ==
Rosenbaum grew up in Florence, Alabama, where his grandfather had owned a small chain of movie theaters. He lived with his father Stanley (a professor) and mother Mildred in the Rosenbaum House, designed by notable architect Frank Lloyd Wright. Rosenbaum's uncle was rabbi Arthur Lelyveld, who was married to his mother's sister Toby, and he was a first cousin of New York Times executive editor Joseph Lelyveld.

Rosenbaum developed a lifelong interest in jazz as a teenager. He frequently refers to it in his film criticism. He attended The Putney School in Putney, Vermont, where his classmates included actor Wallace Shawn. He graduated from Putney in 1961. He attended Bard College, where he played piano in an amateur jazz ensemble that included future actors Chevy Chase as a drummer and Blythe Danner as a vocalist. He studied literature at Bard with the intention of becoming a writer.

== Career ==
After graduate school, Rosenbaum moved to New York and was hired to edit a collection of film criticism, which marked his first foray into the field. He moved to Paris, France, in 1969, working briefly as an assistant to director Jacques Tati and appearing as an extra in Robert Bresson's Four Nights of a Dreamer. While living there, Rosenbaum began writing film and literary criticism for The Village Voice, based in Greenwich Village in New York City, Film Comment, and Sight & Sound. In 1974, he moved from Paris to London, England, remaining there until March 1977, when he was offered a two-semester teaching position at the University of California, San Diego by Manny Farber.

In 1987, Rosenbaum was hired to succeed Dave Kehr as the film critic for The Chicago Reader; he retired from that position in 2008.

In addition, he has written many books on film and its criticism, including Film: The Front Line 1983, Placing Movies: The Practice of Film Criticism (1995), Moving Places: A Life at the Movies (1980; reprint 1995), Movies as Politics (1997), and Essential Cinema (2004). His most popular work is Movie Wars: How Hollywood and the Media Limit What Movies We Can See (2002). He wrote an analysis of Jim Jarmusch's film Dead Man (2000); the book includes recorded interviews with Jarmusch.

Rosenbaum edited This Is Orson Welles (1992), by Welles and Peter Bogdanovich, a collection of interviews and other materials relating to Welles. Rosenbaum consulted on both the 1998 re-editing of Welles's Touch of Evil (which was based on a lengthy memo written by Welles to Universal Pictures in the 1950s) and the 2018 posthumous completion of Welles's The Other Side of the Wind, produced by Peter Bogdanovich and Frank Marshall.

In August 2007, Rosenbaum marked the passing of Swedish director Ingmar Bergman with an op-ed piece in The New York Times, titled "Scenes from an Overrated Career".

He was a frequent contributor to the DVDBeaver website, where he offered his alternative lists of genre films. He writes the "Global Discovery Column" in the film journal Cinema Scope, where he reviews international DVD releases of films that are not widely available. He also writes a column called En Movimiento for the Spanish magazine Caimán Cuadernos De Cine.

Rosenbaum was a visiting professor of film at Virginia Commonwealth University's art history department in Richmond, Virginia from 2010 to 2011.

Rosenbaum participated in the 2012 Sight & Sound critics' poll.

Rosenbaum appears in the 2009 documentary For the Love of Movies: The Story of American Film Criticism, where he discusses the film criticism of Manny Farber.

=== Alternative Top 100 ===
In response to the AFI list of 100 greatest American movies published in 1998, Rosenbaum published his own list, focusing on less well-established, more diverse films. It also includes works by important independent American directors (such as John Cassavetes and Jim Jarmusch) who were absent from the AFI list. A second list by the AFI incorporated five titles from Rosenbaum's list.

In Essential Cinema: On the Necessity of Film Canons (2004), he appended a more general list of his 1,000 favorite films from all nations; slightly more than half were American. He starred his 100 favorite films on the list, marking both traditionally canonical films such as Greed (silent -) and Citizen Kane, and harder-to-find films such as Michael Snow's La Région Centrale and Jacques Rivette's Out 1 (both from 1971).

== Bibliography ==
As author

- Moving Places: A Life in the Movies (1980–1995), ISBN 0-520-08907-3
- Midnight Movies (1983–1991) (with J. Hoberman), ISBN 0-306-80433-6
- Film: The Front Line 1983 (1983), ISBN 0-912869-03-8
- Greed (1993), ISBN 0-85170-806-4
- Placing Movies: The Practice of Film Criticism (1995), ISBN 0-520-08633-3
- Movies as Politics (1997), ISBN 0-520-20615-0
- Dead Man (2000), ISBN 0-85170-806-4
- Movie Wars: How Hollywood and the Media Limit What Films You See A Capella/Chicago Review Press (2000), ISBN 1-55652-454-4
- Abbas Kiarostami (2003), co-author Mehrnaz Saeed-Vafa, Part of series: Contemporary Film Directors, E-Book 2018, ISBN 0-252-07111-5
- Essential Cinema: On the Necessity of Film Canons (2004), ISBN 0-8018-7840-3
- Discovering Orson Welles (2007), ISBN 0-520-25123-7
- The Unquiet American: Transgressive Comedies from the U.S. (2009), ISBN 978-3-89472-693-5
- Goodbye Cinema, Hello Cinephilia: Film Culture in Transition (2010), ISBN 978-0-226-72664-9
- Cinematic Encounters: Interviews and Dialogues (2018), ISBN 978-0-252-08388-4
- Cinematic Encounters 2: Portraits and Polemics (2019), ISBN 978-0-252-08438-6
- In Dreams Begin Responsibilities: A Jonathan Rosenbaum Reader (2024), ISBN 978-1-955-12532-1
- Travels in the Cities of Cinema (2025), ISBN 978-1-942782-88-9
- Camera Movements That Confound Us (2025), ISBN 978-1-942782-95-7

As editor

- This is Orson Welles (1992–1998), ISBN 0-306-80834-X
- Movie Mutations: The Changing Face of World Cinephilia (2003) (with Adrian Martin), ISBN 0-85170-984-2
