= Daniel Freedman =

Daniel Freedman may refer to:

- Daniel X. Freedman (1921–1993), psychiatrist and educator
- Daniel G. Freedman (1927–2008), psychologist
- Daniel Z. Freedman (born 1939), American theoretical physicist
- Danny Freedman, Canadian actor

== See also ==
- Daniel Freeman (disambiguation)
- Daniel Friedman (disambiguation)
