= R v Glad Day Bookshops Inc =

R v Glad Day Bookshops Inc (2004)
- Court: Ontario Superior Court of Justice
- Decided: 2004
- Defendant: Glad Day Bookshops Inc
- Plaintiff: Not specified
- Citation: Not specified

Case history
- Subsequent actions: The court found that a statutory scheme requiring the approval of the Ontario Film Review Board before films can be distributed or shown in Ontario violated the guarantee of freedom of expression in section 2 of the Canadian Charter of Rights and Freedoms.

Court membership
- Judge sitting: Not specified

Case opinions
- The case was symbolic for pornography advocates who argued that anti-pornography laws disproportionately limited the voices of gay and lesbian writers and authors, leading to the impounding of certain titles.

R v Glad Day Bookshops Inc, (2004) is a leading Ontario Superior Court of Justice decision on pornography and homosexuality. The court found that a statutory scheme requiring the approval of the Ontario Film Review Board before films can be distributed or shown in Ontario violated the guarantee of freedom of expression in section 2 of the Canadian Charter of Rights and Freedoms.

== Background ==
Bad Attitude is a lesbian magazine featuring stories of mild sado-masochism; it is published in the United States. In 1993 the magazine was the first publication to fall foul of feminist-inspired pornography laws in Canada.

According to the court's description, the magazine

consists of a series of articles where the writers fantasize about lesbian sexual encounters with a sadomasochistic theme. Photographs loosely complement some of the articles.

A story in the magazine featuring a lesbian stalking, ambushing and pleasuring another woman was found to be obscene, and the Glad Day Bookshop, which sold the investigating officer her copy, was fined C$200.

== Significance ==
The case was symbolic for pornography advocates, who at the time were trying to demonstrate that the arguments of anti-porn feminists Catharine MacKinnon and Andrea Dworkin were antithetical to women's interests. MacKinnon and Dworkin had provided arguments for new obscenity law in Canada; in this case the law disproportionately limited the voices of gay and lesbian writers, and even led to the impounding of two titles written by Dworkin.

== See also ==
- List of notable Canadian lower court cases
- Anti-pornography movement
