= Canadian Museum of Contemporary Photography =

Coordinates: 45.425083°N 75.695329°W

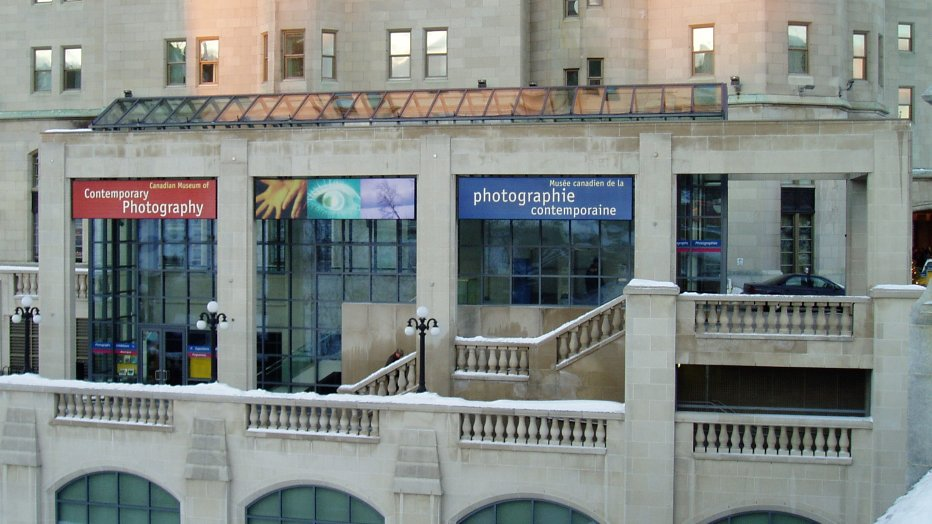
- Established: 1985
- Dissolved: 2009
- Location: within National Gallery of Canada in Ottawa, Ontario, Canada
- Type: gallery
- Website: www.gallery.ca

The Canadian Museum of Contemporary Photography (CMCP) (French: Le Musée canadien de la photographie contemporaine (MCPC)) was a gallery of Canadian contemporary art and documentary photography. Founded in 1985 and affiliated with the National Gallery of Canada (NGC), it was housed at the National Gallery of Canada, located at 380 Sussex Drive, Ottawa.

The CMCP did not have a permanent home until it moved to its purpose-built site at 1 Rideau Canal in 1992. The Pavilion entrance building, which was opened on May 7, 1992, was originally proposed by architect Michael Lundhom, who adapted an old railway tunnel running alongside the Chateau Laurier. The museum ultimately was designed and executed by architects Rysavy Rysavy. The glass and concrete entrance from the street, reminiscent of the colonnade leading into the National Gallery, lead patrons down to the main part of the museum which was located below street level.

Its founding director and chief curator was Martha Langford, who held those positions from 1985 until 1994.

In 2009 it was announced that the CMCP, which had been closed temporarily in 2006, would be permanently closed. Its collections and program of exhibitions were absorbed by the National Gallery of Canada. In 2016, the CMCP's photographic collection was folded into the newly created Canadian Photography Institute (CPI).

== Collection ==
The foundation of the CMCP's collection was a selection of photographs from the Still Photography Division of the National Film Board of Canada. By 2005, it held about 160,000 photographic works including many works by significant Canadian artists and photographers.

== Closure ==
On March 29, 2009 it was announced that the CMCP, which had been closed temporarily in 2006 due to a leak, would be permanently closed for conversion to committee rooms. Its collections and program of exhibitions have since been absorbed by the National Gallery of Canada. A campaign to maintain the CMCP at its purpose-built site was unsuccessful. The exhibitions are now showcased at the National Gallery of Canada. As of 2016, the CMCP's photographic collection has been folded into the newly created Canadian Photography Institute (CPI).

== Affiliations ==
The Museum was affiliated with: National Gallery of Canada, CMA, CHIN, and Virtual Museum of Canada.
