= Rudder v Microsoft Corp. =

1999 Ontario Superior Court case

Rudder v Microsoft Corp. [1999] OJ No 3778 (Sup Ct J). is an Ontario Superior Court case that is the leading decision on clickwrap licenses and forum selection clauses in Canada.

== Background ==
Rudder brought a class action on behalf of MSN subscribers in Canada for, among other things, improperly charging MSN subscriber's credit cards violating the terms of the contract.

Microsoft filed to dismiss the class action on the grounds of forum non conveniens. They argued that the contract between them and the subscribers contained a forum selection clause which gave exclusive jurisdiction to Washington state to resolve any disputes.

Rudder argued that the particular clause was not valid as it was not adequately brought to the attention of the user. The provision was sufficiently important that it required special notice.

== Opinion of the Court ==
Justice Warren Winkler found in favour of Microsoft and held that the clause was enforceable. Winkler rejected Rudder's argument, stating that "Admittedly, the entire Agreement cannot be displayed at once on the computer screen, but this is not materially different from a multi-page written document which requires a party to turn the pages."

Winkler observed that users were required to click on the "I agree" button to accept the terms, and that the impugned clause was no harder to read than any of the others. The sign-up procedure itself required users to click "I agree" twice, where the second time the user was told that they would still be bound to the terms even if they do not read them all. Winkler did not find it reasonable for Rudder to argue for the enforcement of all the other terms of the contract except for the forum clause. A finding in favour of the plaintiff, said Winkler, would not advance the goals of commercial certainty.

In concluding, Winkler held that "click-wrap" agreements in general should be "afforded the sanctity that must be given to any agreement in writing."

== See also ==
- List of notable Canadian lower court cases
- Caspi v. Microsoft Network – Similar US case
