= Blainey v Ontario Hockey Association =

Blainey v Ontario Hockey Association (1986) 54 O.R. (2d) 513 is a famous decision of the Court of Appeal for Ontario on the relationship between the Canadian Charter of Rights and Freedoms and the Ontario Human Rights Code. The Court held that Human Rights Codes in general are statutes and so must conform with the Charter.

Justine Blainey was excluded from playing in the boys hockey league by the Ontario Hockey Association. She was unable to bring a claim against the OHA because the Ontario Human Rights Code contained a provision that allowed male-only sports teams and since the OHA was a private organization the Charter did not apply to it. Instead she challenged the constitutionality of the provision of the Human Rights Code as a violation of the equality provision of the Charter.

The Court held that Section 19(2) of the Ontario Human Rights Code, which stated, "The right under section 1 to equal treatment with respect to services and facilities is not infringed where membership in an athletic organization or participation in an athletic activity is restricted to persons of the same sex", was unconstitutional, and struck down the provision.

== See also ==
- List of notable Canadian Courts of Appeal cases
