= Leila Sujir =

Canadian artist (born 1951)

- Born: 1951 (age 74–75); Hyderabad, India
- Notable work: Dreams of the Night Cleaners
- Website: leilasujir.com

Leila Sujir (born 1951) is a Canadian video artist.

== Career ==
Sujir was born in 1951 in Hyderabad India. She immigrated to Canada with her family in 1956. She received a Bachelor of Arts degree in English literature from the University of Alberta in 1971. She co-directed her first film, "Spectra" in 1973. In 1974, she spent a summer in Halifax studying experimental filmmaking at the Nova Scotia College of Art and Design. Sujir also undertook graduate studies in post-colonial and post-modern theory at the University of Calgary with visiting theorists and poets Robert Kroetsch (1979) and Eli Mandel (1985), and literary theory at Simon Fraser University in Vancouver in 1981. In 1994, Sujir's video "India Hearts Beat" (1988) was included in the exhibition New Canadian Video at the Museum of Modern Art, New York. She has been based in Montreal since 1999, working as a professor of Video art in the fine arts department of Concordia University. From 2005 to 2006, Sujir worked at the University of Calgary as Distinguished Visiting Scholar working in the Interactions Lab at the Computing Science Department where she developed a digital 3D interactive media work. Since 2006, she has continued to teach at Concordia University, now in the university's Intermedia/Cyberarts (IMCA) program. In 2016–2019, received a three-year Social Sciences Humanities Research grant, "Exploring Elastic 3D Spaces: Bodies and Belonging". In 2022, she served as Chair of the Studio Arts Department at Concordia University in the Faculty of Fine Arts, and an associate professor in the Intermedia area (Video, Performance, and Electronic Arts).

Sujir has been an artist in residence at the National Art School in Sydney, Australia (2012), at the Sydney College of the Arts at the University of Sydney, Australia (2013), at the Banff Centre (2013 and 2014), and at the Bath School of Art at Bath Spa University in the UK (2014-2015) where she developed a stereoscopic video projection for a building facade, Elastic City Spacey (2015).

== Work ==
Sujir is known for her video works examining cultural origin and difference. The Dreams of the Night Cleaners (1995) examines the lives of three night-shift employees at a Canadian airport. She co-produced the docu-fiction with the assistance of the National Film Board of Canada and The Banff Centre for the Arts, and won the Jury prize from the Alberta Motion Picture Industry Association Awards in 1995. In 1999, a solo survey exhibition of Sujir's videos and installations of the past ten years, Leila Sujir: Luminous Stories, curated by Katherine Ylitalo for the Art Gallery of Peterborough, toured across Canada.

A large format video art commission, Aerial, an artistic experiment with IMAX technologies, commissioned by curator Janine Marchessault for Outer Worlds, with the work of four other artists besides Sujir (Oliver Husain, Lisa Jackson, Kelly Richardson, and Michael Snow) and supported by a Canada Council New Chapter grant, was launched in 2019 at the Cinesphere IMAX at the closing night of the Images festival. Her ongoing stereoscopic 3D and Virtual Reality media art project, Forest! is situated in the old growth rainforests of the South Walbran Valley of Vancouver Island, on the traditional and ancestral lands of the Pacheedaht First Nation.

== Collections ==
Suijir's video works are held by several museum collections, including the National Gallery of Canada, the University of Lethbridge Art Gallery, and in Montbéliard, France, Centre international de création vidéo.
