= Prise de parole Inc. v Guérin, éditeur Ltée. =

Judgement of the Canadian Federal Court of Appeal

- Court: Federal Court of Canada
- Full case name: Prise de parole Incorporated v. Guérin, éditeur Limitée
- Decided: 1995-11-27
- Citation: 104 FTR 104, 66 CPR (3d) 257, [1995] FCJ No 1583, 60 ACWS (3d) 390,

Case history
- Appealed to: Federal Court of Appeal (affirmed)

Case opinions
- Decision by: Denault J.

Keywords
- copyright, moral rights

Prise de parole Inc. v Guérin, éditeur Ltée. is a leading Canadian case on moral rights in Canadian copyright law. The Federal Court of Canada found that the plaintiff's moral rights had not been violated because there was no objective evidence that the reproduction caused harm to his reputation.

== Background ==
In 1992, the defendant Guérin, éditeur Ltée. published a literary collection to be used in schools, entitled Libre expression, which contained a number of stories and excerpts of stories. One of the stories included was a substantial extract from La vengeance de l'orignal by Doric Germain. Germain had assigned copyright to his work to Prise de parole Inc., the plaintiff.

Under Canadian copyright law, moral rights cannot be assigned. Germain therefore retained these rights, and claimed at trial that the defendant had distorted his work by taking extracts while omitting subplots and context. The excerpts of the story were also presented out of order in the collection.

== Opinion of the Court ==
The Court noted that to establish a moral rights infringement under section 28.2, the claimant need only show that the work was distorted, mutilated, or otherwise modified "to the prejudice of the author's honour or reputation" and that actual prejudice to reputation or honour need not be proven.

Following the decision of Snow v. Eaton Centre Ltd., the Court noted that prejudice must first be determined on a subjective standard based on the author's opinion. Second, it must also be determined on an objective standard that is based on public or expert opinion in order to establish that the author's opinion was reasonable. The evidence presented did not objectively show that there was any prejudice and there was no evidence of actual harm. The Court observed that Germain had "not been ridiculed or mocked by his colleagues or the newspapers and he had not personally heard any complaints after the [collection] was published."

"In short, although the author has shown that his novel was substantially modified without his knowledge and that he was shocked and distressed by this, the evidence has not shown that, objectively, as required by section 28.2(1) of the Act, his work was modified to the prejudice of his honour or reputation. Since this has not been proven, the plaintiff is not entitled to moral damages."

Despite there being no finding of prejudice, due to the conduct of the defendant, the Court awarded the plaintiff $10,000.
