= Justine Blainey-Broker =

Canadian ice hockey player

- Born: January 11, 1973 (age 53) Canada
- Height: 5 ft 4 in (163 cm)
- Position: Defence
- CIAU NWHL team: Toronto Lady Blues; Brampton Thunder
- National team: Canada
- Playing career: 1981–present
- Website: www.blaineywellness.com

Justine Blainey-Broker (born January 11, 1973) is a Canadian former women's ice hockey player for the Toronto Lady Blues women's ice hockey program. Prior to playing for the Lady Blues, she had gone to the Ontario Court of Appeal in 1986 as part of a discrimination lawsuit regarding the Metro Toronto Hockey League.

== MTHL ==
In 1981, Justine Blainey won a spot on a Metro Toronto Hockey League Team (MTHL) called the Toronto Olympics. Despite making the team, she was denied the chance to play. This denial was attributed to MTHL regulations that did not permit women in the league. Blainey addressed a complaint to the Human Rights Commission but the Ontario Human Rights Code specifically allowed sexual discrimination in sports. Blainey chose to appeal the Ontario law. Initially, she lost the case in Ontario Supreme Court but won her case in the Ontario Court of Appeal in 1986. Charles Dubin, who was involved in the inquiry regarding Olympic sprinter Ben Johnson's steroid use, was the writer of the decision. Overall, she was involved in five different court cases. Despite the legal issues, she managed to play for several other MTHL teams including the Scarborough Young Bruins, Etobicoke Canucks and East Ender Ti-Cats. Many coaches had her listed on team rosters as Justin Blainey.

=== Blainey v. Ontario Hockey Association ===
Blainey v Ontario Hockey Association (1986) 54 O.R. (2d) 513 was the legal name for the case. The basis for the case was the relationship between the Canadian Charter of Rights and Freedoms and the Ontario Human Rights Code. The Court held that Human Rights Codes in general are statutes and so must conform with the Charter. The Court held that the exception for sports teams violated Section Fifteen of the Canadian Charter of Rights and Freedoms in a way that could not be justified under Section One of the Canadian Charter of Rights and Freedoms, and struck down the provision.

== Toronto Lady Blues ==
Blainey played for the Toronto Lady Blues women's ice hockey program in the 1990s and assumed another activist role. In 1993, (although the Lady Blues won 13 of the last 15 provincial championships), a task force recommended that the University of Toronto cut the team for financial reasons. Justine Blainey, a member of the team, organized a "Save the Team" night that raised over $8,000. She personally called 100 alumni during a one-week fundraising blitz. Blainey had previously earned national recognition as she endured five different court cases before her right to play was affirmed by the Ontario Court of Appeal in 1986 because the Metro Toronto Hockey League denied her the opportunity to play hockey for them in 1981. The Supreme Court of Canada refused to hear a further appeal from the League later that year.

== Brampton Thunder ==
In the formation of the National Women's Hockey League, Blainey played for the Brampton Thunder.

== Personal ==
Blainey graduated in 1995 from the University of Toronto Scarborough in Bachelor of Science degree in psychology and chemistry and subsequently completed her Doctor of Chiropractic at the Canadian Memorial Chiropractic College (CMCC) in Toronto. She married chiropractor Blake Broker, with whom she has two children: daughter Yohanna (age 24–25) and son Théo (age 22–23). She operates the Justine Blainey Wellness Centre, a chiropractic practice in Brampton. She continues to promote equality as well as healthy living through public speaking.
