= Englander v Telus Communications Inc =

Judgement of the Canadian Federal Court of Appeal

Englander v Telus Communications Inc, 2004 FCA 387 was a Federal Court of Appeal decision on Canadian privacy law under PIPEDA.

== Background ==
An individual named Mathew Englander resided in Vancouver. Englander filed a complaint with the Privacy Commissioner of Canada against Telus, his residential telephone service provider, for disclosing its customers' personal information to third parties without the customers' knowledge and consent, and for charging customers a two-dollar fee to have an unlisted phone number.

The Privacy Commissioner found the complaint not well-founded, citing a Canadian Radio-television and Telecommunications Commission (CRTC) rule that allowed a fee of up to two dollars for being de-listed. Englander then applied to the Federal Court of Canada – Trial Division for a judicial declaration that Telus's policies contravened PIPEDA, and other relief, but the court dismissed the application.

== Opinion of the Court of Appeal ==
The Court of appeal held that Telus was permitted to charge a fee under the CRTC regulations for name removal. However, the Court also found that Telus violated PIPEDA by not gaining full consent when they failed to offer the option to have the name excluded from the white pages when the customer signed up for the program.
