= Daniel E. Friedmann =

Canadian businessman

Daniel Friedmann
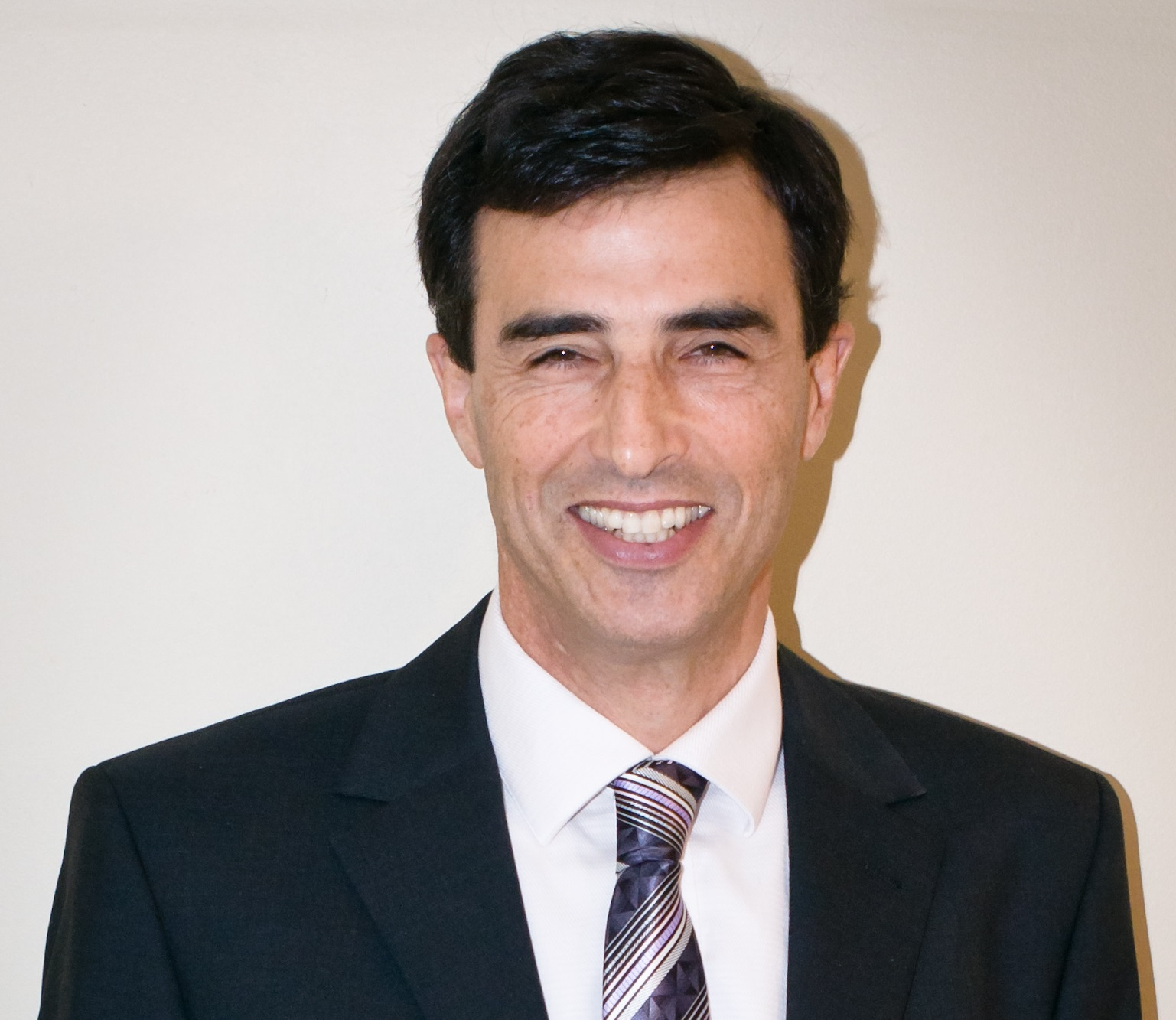
- Born: September 19, 1956 (age 70); Santiago, Chile
- Education: University of British Columbia
- Occupation: Chief Executive Officer
- Employer: Carbon Engineering Ltd.

Daniel Eduardo Friedmann serves as Carbon Engineering's CEO and Board Chair. Friedmann assumed the role of CEO in January, 2022, having served on CE's board for the previous five years, four of which as Board Chair.

Until 2016, Friedmann was CEO of MacDonald, Dettwiler and Associates for 20 years, during which time the company's revenue grew 19-fold and market capitalization increased 35-fold.

== Career ==
Friedmann was born Sept. 19, 1956, in Chile, and immigrated to Vancouver as a teenager; his family was part of a group that left Chile during the presidency of Salvador Allende. He studied engineering physics at the University of British Columbia and in 1979 went to work for MacDonald, Dettwiler and Associates, a company that at that time specialized in hardware and software for satellite ground stations. Over time the company started to work on satellites, designing and eventually owning Canada's RADARSAT system, and around 1990 diversified into software for the real estate industry, buying BC OnLine from provincial government of British Columbia. Friedmann rose through the ranks and became president in 1993 and CEO in 1995. As CEO he tried to focus the company on the real estate business and to exit the satellite business by selling it to a US company in 2008; the Canadian government vetoed the deal on national security grounds. Friedmann sold the real estate business in 2010 and focused MDA on developing businesses based on its engineering expertise, like robotics, and going deeper into the satellite business, buying the satellite builder, SSL in 2012.

Friedmann stepped down as CEO in 2016 to make way for an executive from the US.

Friedmann was selected as a 2015–2016 Brendan Wood TopGun CEO in Canada for Technology, Media and Telecommunications.

Friedmann is currently CEO and Chairman of Carbon Engineering, a company dedicated to removing CO_{2} from the air to aid in solving climate change.

== Self-published books ==
He has published several books: The Genesis One Code in 2012, The Broken Gift in 2013. The books offered his beliefs about how the Tanakh can be reconciled with modern scientific understanding. He also published Roadmap to the End of Days in 2017, The Biblical Clock in 2019, Mysteries of the First Instant in 2021, and a business book An MBA from Heaven in 2019.
