= Daniel X. Freedman =

American physician

Daniel Xander Freedman (17 August 1921 – 3 June 1993) was a psychiatrist and educator, pioneer in biological psychiatry.

== Biography ==
Born in Lafayette, Indiana, he performed pioneering studies in the relationship between drugs and behavior. Researching brain mechanism in allergy, he discovered the link of hallucinogens to brain transmitters. He also found biological effects of environmental stress on the brain, and identified hyperserotonemia in autism.

After attending Harvard College in the class of 1943, he enlisted in United States Army Signal Corps in July 1942. He later attended Yale School of Medicine and ultimately became Professor of Psychiatry at Yale until 1966 when he left Yale to become Chairman of the Psychiatry department at the University of Chicago where he continued his psychopharmaceutical research, primarily concerned with 5-hydroxytryptamine (serotonin).

The final phase of his career was spent at University of California, Los Angeles as professor of Psychiatry. His wife, Mary Freedman is a talented artist.

As Dan Freedman, he was a musician. One of his specialties was accompanying himself on the piano while giving a fine impression of Groucho Marx singing "Lydia the Tattooed Lady".

== Publications ==
- Handbook of Psychiatry (30 Volumes), Volume Twenty
