= La Région Centrale =

1971 film by Michael Snow

- Directed by: Michael Snow
- Cinematography: Pierre Abbeloos
- Distributed by: Canadian Filmmakers Distribution Centre
- Release date: 1971
- Running time: 180 minutes
- Country: Canada

La Région Centrale is a 1971 experimental Canadian film directed by Michael Snow. The film is 180 minutes long and shot over a period of 24 hours using a robotic arm, and consists entirely of preprogrammed movements.

== Description ==
La Région Centrale is three hours long, composed of seventeen shots of an uninhabited mountainous landscape. Between each take, the screen is black with a white X in the center. In the beginning, the camera moves to capture its surroundings with slow, continuous gestures. Over the course of the film, the movement crescendos as the camera spins rapidly.

== Development ==
Snow had the idea in 1964 to create a film where a camera moved "in every direction and on every plane of a sphere". During the late 1960s he created three films that experimented with camera movement: Wavelength, Standard Time, and <--->. He researched machines that could automatically move a camera in complex ways, particularly surveillance devices. The Canadian Film Development Corporation gave Snow a grant of $28,000, and he received additional funding from the Famous Players chain of theatres.

At the recommendation of IMAX co-founder Graeme Ferguson, Snow contacted Pierre Abbeloos, an engineer at the National Film Board of Canada. He commissioned Abbeloos to construct a "Camera Activating Machine" (CAM), a robotic arm on which a 16 mm camera could be mounted. Abbeloos took a year to design and build the device. To generate a control signal for the CAM, Abbeloos used the selsyn from the Arriflex 16ST camera and converted it into a spectrum of frequencies sent to the CAM's control box. This operated the camera's zoom and determined the CAM's motion through a series of tones.

== Production ==
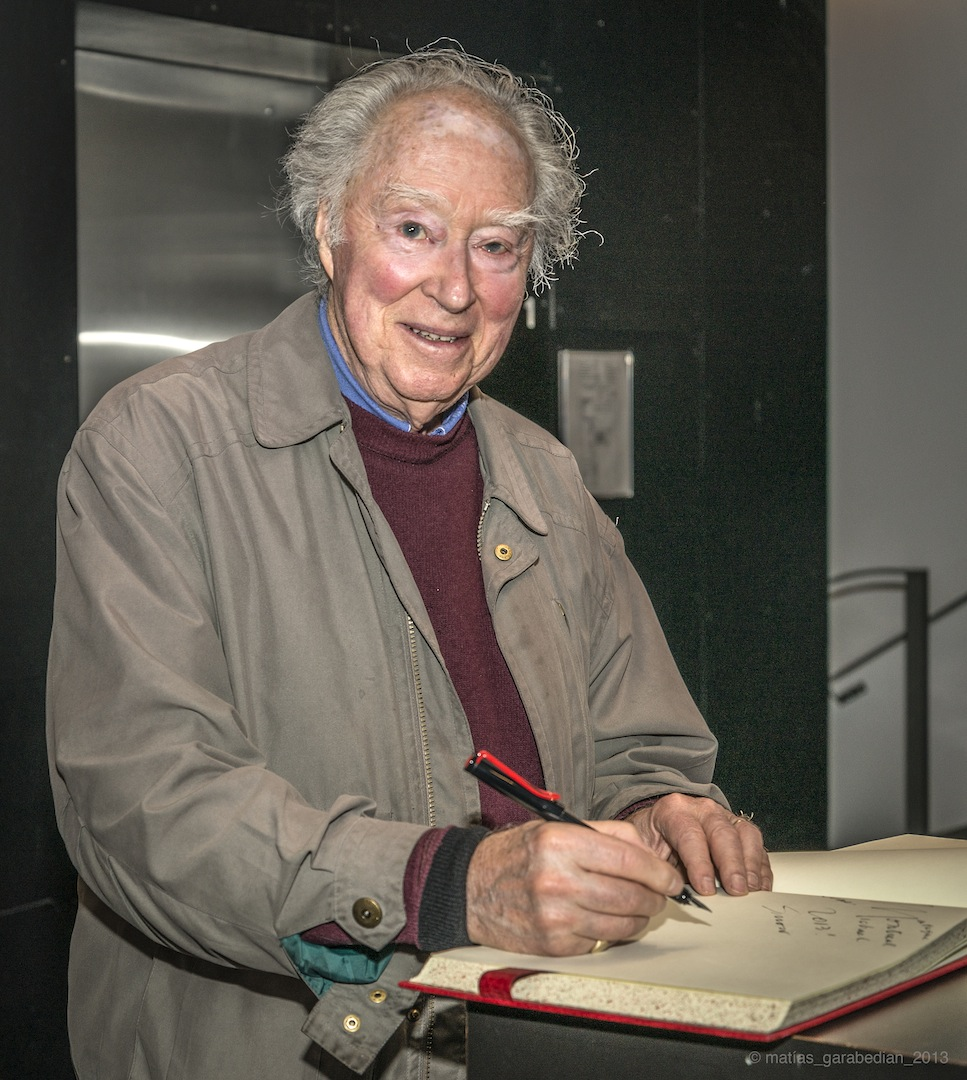
Director Michael Snow in 2013

Snow wanted to film a location with no traces of human activity. He originally considered the countryside north of his mother's birthplace of Chicoutimi in Saguenay, Quebec as well as Kapuskasing or Timmins, both mining areas that his father had surveyed in Northern Ontario. He scouted northern Quebec and found a mountain 160 km (100 mi) north of Sept-Îles.

Snow shot La Région Centrale from September 14 to 20, 1970 with his wife Joyce Wieland, Abbeloos, and Bernard Goussard. They chartered a helicopter to transport them to the mountain. Snow and his team were shooting for five days, producing sixty hours of footage. He edited the film during a residency at the Nova Scotia College of Art and Design.

For the film's soundtrack, Snow wanted to use the tones that controlled the CAM. He found it difficult to record the sound directly onto film in sync with the image; instead, he used a modified Revox to record the tones coming from the CAM's control box on quarter-inch cartridges. He dubbed the sound in post-production.

== Release ==
La Région Centrale was released in 1971. At the National Gallery of Canada, the film was exhibited along with the CAM, to which Abbeloos added a CCTV camera. The CAM responded to passersby with a 30-minute sequence of pre-programmed movements. When the film was shown at the Center for Inter-American Relations in 1972, Snow presented the modified CAM as a video sculpture titled De La.

== Reception and legacy ==
Jonas Mekas wrote that it was "curious how…'The Central Region' works totally mechanically, with computerized camera movements, and comes up with an unmistakable personal style". Wyndham Wise commented,

"In a brilliant convergence of form and content, camera movement becomes the reason d’etre. Rarely, if ever, has a film so clearly delineated the role of this machine in our reception and perception of the objected filmed. To make the film, Snow worked with a technician to design a mechanized camera that was able to move without human intervention in every direction imaginable. To further erase the influence of humans, Snow filmed in the remote reaches of Northern Quebec, where his camera roamed the landscape, in a manner both systematic and arbitrary. It’s both an exhilarating celebration of cinema’s unique qualities and a clever joke on the landscape tradition in Canadian art."

J. Hoberman ranked La Région Centrale as the second best film of the 1970s. It received five critics' votes and two directors' votes in the 2012 Sight & Sound polls of the world's greatest films. The film is now part of Anthology Film Archives' Essential Cinema Repertory collection. Jean-Luc Godard repurposed the film's title for a section of his 2018 essay film The Image Book examining depictions of the Arab Maghreb in cinema.
