= Teck Corp Ltd v Millar =

Teck Corp Ltd v Millar (1972) 33 DLR (3d) 288 is an important Canadian corporate law decision on a corporate director's fiduciary duty in the context of a takeover bid.

== Facts ==
Afton Mines Ltd’s majority owner was Teck Corp Ltd. Teck wanted to replace the board with its own nominees. It wanted Afton to enter the ‘ultimate deal’ with Teck to exploit mineral rights that Afton possessed. Before that could happen the Afton directors started an exploitation agreement with Canex. This agreement, common in Canada, provided Canex be issued with a large number of shares. This displaced Teck’s majority.

== Judgment ==
Justice Thomas R. Berger of the British Columbia Supreme Court held that a director may resist a hostile take-over so long as they are acting in good faith, and they have reasonable grounds to believe that the take-over will cause substantial harm to the interests of the shareholders collectively. Berger J said the following:

If today the directors of a company were to consider the interests of its employees no one would argue that in doing so they were not acting bona fide in the interests of the company itself. Similarly, if the directors were to consider the consequences to the community of any policy that the company intended to pursue and were deflected in their commitment to that policy as a result, it could not be said that they had not considered bona fide the interests of the shareholders.

[...]

...their [sc. the directors’] purpose was to obtain the best agreement they could while ... still in control. Their purpose was in that sense to defeat Teck. But, not to defeat Teck's attempt to obtain control, rather it was to foreclose Teck's opportunity of obtaining for itself the ultimate deal. That was ... no improper purpose.

== Significance ==
The case was viewed as a shift away from the standard set in the English case of Hogg v. Cramphorn Ltd. (1963). Recent scholarship has made the following observation:

[94] The decision in Teck v Millar, a seminal case on directors' duties, is consistent with the duty to protect shareholder interests from harm. Teck Corporation, a senior mining company, had acquired a majority of voting shares in Afton Mines Ltd., a junior mining company that owned an interest in a valuable copper deposit. In doing so, Teck sought to ensure procurement of a contract with Afton to develop the copper property. Before Teck could exercise its majority voting control to replace the board of directors with its own nominees, the Afton board signed a contract with another company that effectively ended Teck’s control position in Afton. In evaluating the evidence, Justice Berger was satisfied that Teck, the majority shareholder, "would cause substantial damage to the interests of Afton and its shareholders." In determining that the directors had not breached their fiduciary duty to the corporation, shareholder interests were distinguished from control interests. Drawing this distinction is key, "because once Teck's interest in acquiring control is put to one side, its interest, like that of the other shareholders, was in seeing Afton make the best deal available." Accordingly, the directors had made a decision that, despite affecting the control interests of the majority shareholder, had protected the shareholder interests of all shareholders (including Teck's) from harm. This concern for the collective interests of shareholders, rather than strict adherence to majority rule, is consistent with the tripartite fiduciary duty.

== See also ==
- BCE Inc v 1976 Debentureholders
