= Martha Langford =

Canadian art historian (born 1953)

Professor Martha Langford
- Born: December 18, 1953 (age 72); Ottawa, Ontario, Canada

Academic background
- Education: Nova Scotia College of Art and Design; PhD., McGill University
- Thesis: Suspended conversations, private photographic albums in the public collection of the McCord Museum of Canadian History (1997)

Academic work
- Discipline: Art history
- Institutions: Concordia University
- Website: https://www.concordia.ca/finearts/art-history/faculty.html?fpid=martha-langford

Martha Langford CM FRSC (born December 18, 1953) is a Canadian art historian. She is a Distinguished University Research Professor of art history at Concordia University and was previously the Research Chair and Director of the Gail and Stephen A. Jarislowsky Institute for Studies in Canadian Art. She was the founding director of the Canadian Museum of Contemporary Photography and served as its director and chief curator from 1985 until 1994. In 2018 she was elected Fellow of the Royal Society of Canada. She was made a Member of the Order of Canada on December 31, 2025.

== Personal life ==
Langford was born in Ottawa. Her father Warren was a civil servant and amateur photographer during the Cold War era. In 2011, Langford and her brother John published A Cold War Tourist and His Camera, which examined their father's photographs. Besides John, Langford also has two other siblings, Stuart Langford and Suzanne Morrison.

== Education ==
Langford was educated at the Nova Scotia College of Art and Design before obtaining her MA and PhD from McGill University. She published her thesis under the title "Suspended conversations, private photographic albums in the public collection of the McCord Museum of Canadian History." In 2001, she republished her thesis as Suspended Conversations: The Afterlife of Memory in Photographic Albums.

== Career ==
After working for nine years with the National Film Board of Canada, Still Photography Division, where she was Executive Producer from 1981 to 1985, she was the founding director of the Canadian Museum of Contemporary Photography. From 1985 to 1994, she served as its director and chief curator. In 1989, Langford was awarded the Government of Canada Merit Award. She then went on to complete her doctorate and sat on the board of Le Mois de la Photo à Montréal. Before she was hired by Concordia University as a professor of art history in 2004, Langford had taught at the University of Ottawa, McGill University, and Bishop's University.

In 2007, Langford published Scissors, Paper, Stone: Expressions of Memory in Contemporary Photographic Art with McGill-Queen's University Press. The book is a study of the role of memory in contemporary photographic art. Two years later, Langford worked as a curatorial consultant for the Musée du Quai Branly photographic biennale PhotoQuai 2009 and was the commissioning curator for Preoccupations: Photographic Explorations of the Grey Nuns Mother House for Concordia University.

In 2011, Langford was appointed research chair and director of Concordia University's Gail and Stephen A. Jarislowsky Institute for Studies in Canadian Art, succeeding François-Marc Gagnon. Before obtaining this position, Langford served as editor-in-chief of the Journal of Canadian Art History and an advisory board member for Ciel variable magazine.

In 2017, Langford published an edited collection, Narratives Unfolding: National Art Histories in an Unfinished World, which discussed contemporary art historical approaches and their relationship to the notion of national art.

In June 2018, Langford was selected as a research fellow at the Canadian Photography Institute. A few months later, in September, she was elected a Fellow of the Royal Society of Canada.

== Inspiration ==
While at the Nova Scotia College of Art and Design, Langford cited Michael Snow as an inspiration. As a result, she has published multiple papers on his work. In 2014, she published Michael Snow: Life & Work through the Art Canada Institute which presented an overview of his life and work.

== Selected publications ==
=== Books ===
- Langford, Martha, ed. (1984). Contemporary Canadian Photography from the Collection of the National Film Board = Photographie canadienne contemporaine de la collection de l'Office national du film (in English and French). Edmonton, AB: Hurtig. ISBN 0888302649.
- Power plays: contemporary photography from Canada. Edinburgh: Stills. 1989. ISBN 0906458048.
- Langford, Martha (1992). Beau : A Reflection on the Nature of Beauty in Photography = Une réflexion sur la nature de la beauté en photographie (in English and French). Ottawa: Canadian Museum of Contemporary Photography/Musée canadien de la photographie contemporaine. ISBN 0888845626.
- George Steeves: 1979-1993 (in English and French). Ottawa: Canadian Museum of Contemporary Photography/Musée canadien de la photographie contemporaine. 1993. ISBN 0888845669.
- Langford, Martha (2021) [2001]. Suspended Conversations: The Afterlife of Memory in Photographic Albums (2nd ed.). Montréal and Kingston: McGill-Queen's University Press. ISBN 9780228001386.
- Langford, Martha, ed. (2005). Image & Imagination. Montréal and Kingston: McGill-Queen's University Press. ISBN 9780773529694.
- Langford, Martha (2012). Scissors, Paper, Stone: Expressions of Memory in Contemporary Photographic Art. Montréal and Kingston: McGill-Queen's University Press. ISBN 9780773540781.
- Langford, Martha (2014). Michael Snow : life & work. Toronto: Art Canada Institute. ISBN 9781487100049.
- Langford, Martha (2017). Narratives Unfolding: National Art Histories in an Unfinished World. Montréal and Kingston: McGill-Queen's University Press. ISBN 9780773549791.

=== Articles ===
Langford contributes to such journals as Journal of Canadian Studies,Captures,Journal of Canadian Art History / Annales d'histoire de l'art Canadien, Visual Studies, among others.
