= Back and Forth (film) =

1969 film

- Directed by: Michael Snow
- Starring: Allan Kaprow
- Edited by: Michael Snow
- Release date: 1969
- Running time: 52 minutes
- Countries: Canada; United States
- Language: English

Back and Forth, also known as <--->, is a 1969 structural film by Canadian director Michael Snow. Shot in and outside a classroom at the Madison, New Jersey campus of Fairleigh Dickinson University, the camera pans and tilts with varying frequency.

== Content ==
Frames from Back and Forth (1969)

The first section shows a pan across a building’s exterior as a person walks into frame. A cut to a classroom interior shows a pan continuing the same movement along a fixed arc, both endpoints of which are signaled by the sound of the camera hitting a wooden stop arm. For most of this first section, the pans occur with the same frequency. Figures appear at various points in the field of view described by the pan’s arc (often on-camera, at one of the pan’s endpoints, but potentially also at any point in-between, either on- or off-camera). Three-quarters into this section, the pans begin to accelerate, until the image blurs.

The second section uses a tilt, which shows the room from floor to ceiling. Over this section’s duration, the tilts gradually decelerate.

A title card is shown, giving the shooting location, the names of people who appeared or were nearby, the equipment used, the names of the recording and processing facilities used, and the work’s distributor.

The final section superimposes previous pan and tilt sequences (some reversed or shown upside-down), intercut with black and white footage.

== Production ==
A title card appearing in the film reads:

This film was shot at Fairleigh Dickinson University, Madison, N.J. in July 1968. Editing and recording were completed in January 1969 in New York. Appearing in the film are: Allan Kaprow, Emmett Williams, Max Neuhaus, Terri Marsala, Donna Aughey, Joyce Wieland, Luis Camnitzer, George Murphy, Susan, Ay-O, Dr. Gordon, Liba Bayrak, Annie Scotty, Mary, Mac, students from the H.E.P. Program and others. Nearby were Nancy Graves, Richard Serra, John Giorno, Paul Ide, Alison Knowles, Jud Yalkut and many others—film stock was Ektachrome 7257, camera: Bolex H16 with Kinotar 12.7 lens. Recording was by Darvin Studio and prints by Filmtronics (New York). Available from New York Film-Makers' Cooperative, 175 Lexington.

== Cast ==
- Allan Kaprow
- Emmett Williams
- Max Neuhaus
- Joyce Wieland
- Luis Camnitzer

== Reception ==
Manny Farber, writing in the January 1970 issue of Artforum, commented on the work's sculptural effects: "Basically it's a perpetual motion film that ingeniously builds a sculptural effect by insisting on time-motion to the point where the camera's swinging arcs and white wall field assume the hardness, the dimensions of a concrete beam." Farber went on to single out the soundtrack's use of percussion as a sculptural element: "In such a hard, drilling work, the wooden clap sounds are a terrific invention, and, as much as any single element, create the sculpture. Seeming to thrust the image outward off the screen, these clap effects are timed like a metronome, sometimes occurring with torrential frequency."

Gene Youngblood, in the January 2–8, 1970, edition of the Los Angeles Free Press, regarded Back and Forth as an expansion of cinema's narrative parameters: ". . . in 'Back and Forth,' Snow was able to completely suffuse form with content, while not relinquishing the traditional elements of characterization and acting." Writing in The Monthly Film Bulletin, for September 1976, Jonathan Rosenbaum similarly addressed the film's use of characterization: "Although a man crosses the visual field in the opening shot, and people are glimpsed at intervals throughout, their presence comprises not the subject but the counterpoint of a physical process defined by the continual panning motion of the camera."

== See also ==
- Minimalist film
- Cinema of Canada
