= List of Vancouver court cases =

This article lists legal cases that originated in Vancouver that are significant because have proven to be the leading case law, or because they received significant media attention. Many of these Vancouver cases went on to be decided by the Supreme Court of Canada. The cases are listed in chronological order.

1. R. v. Gillian Guess (1998)

This case is significant because it explored whether jurors can face criminal sanction for the decisions they have made, and because it is the only case in Canadian legal history where jury room discussions were made part of the public record.

2. R. v. Sharpe (2001)

This case is significant because it explored whether Canada's criminal laws against child pornography violate the Canadian Charter of Rights and Freedoms.

3. Trinity Western University v. British Columbia College of Teachers (2001)

This is a leading Supreme Court of Canada decision on the freedom of religion and the court's ability to review a private school's policies.

4. R. v. Glen Clark

The trial of the former British Columbia premier on corruption charges.

http://www.courts.gov.bc.ca/jdb-txt/SC/02/12/2002BCSC1267.htm

5. R. v. Sukhvir Singh Khosa (2002)

This case is significant because the accused persons were convicted of reckless driving causing the death of Irene Thorpe, but they were not sentenced to jail time. The case fueled debate on when condition sentences are appropriate.

http://www.courts.gov.bc.ca/jdb-txt/sc/03/02/2003bcsc0221.htm

6. R. v. Malik and Bagri (2005) - The Air India Trial

http://www.courts.gov.bc.ca/Jdb-txt/SC/05/03/2005BCSC0350.htm

7. Stopps v. Just Ladies Fitness (2006)

Mr. Stopps is a male who sued a female only fitness facility and argued he had been discriminated because of his sex.

8. R. v. Robert Pickton (2007)

Mr Pickton is accused of killing 26 women. The jury portion of his trial commences in January 2007.

== See also ==
- List of Canadian courts of appeal cases
- List of Supreme Court of Canada cases
