= Bettel v Yim =

Bettel v Yim (1978), 20 O.R. (2d) 617 is a Canadian tort case from Ontario. The Court established that an individual is liable for all harm that flows from his or her conduct even where the harm was not intended.

== See also ==
- List of notable Canadian lower court cases
