= Moral rights in Canadian copyright law =

Moral rights in Canadian copyright law are protected under the Copyright Act of Canada and include an author's right to attribution, integrity and association of a work. Moral rights are to be distinguished from economic rights; moral rights essentially being derived from the reflection of the author's personality in his or her work, whereas economic rights grant an author the ability to benefit economically from their work. An author of a work retains moral rights for the length of the copyright, even if the copyright has been assigned or licensed to another party. Moral rights cannot be assigned or licensed, but can be waived by contract.

== History ==
Moral rights in Canada can be traced back to a 1915 amendment of the Criminal Code. The amendment created a criminal offence to change a copyrighted dramatic, operatic or musical work that was to be publicly performed for profit or to suppress its title or authorship without the author's consent. Canada also legislated moral rights into the Copyright Act in 1931, stemming from a revision of the Berne Convention for the Protection of Literary and Artistic Works in 1928. The provision was further clarified and expanded in 1988. In 2012, the Copyright Modernization Act added moral rights for aural and sound recorded performances.

== Statutory provisions ==
The relevant provisions of the Copyright Act that deal with moral rights are:

=== S14.1, S14.2, S17.1, and S17.2 ===
Section 14.1 defines moral rights as the author's right to the integrity of the work, the author's right to create the work under his or her own name, pseudonym or anonymously (known as the right of attribution). Section 14.1 also lays out that moral rights can be waived in whole or in part, but cannot be transferred or waived using an assignment or license. Section 14.2 states that moral rights last the length of the term of copyright and upon the author's death the rights do pass to those upon whom the work was bequeathed.

Section 17.1 and 17.2 provide the same rights and definitions as 14.1 and 14.2, but in relation to live aural performances and sound recordings.

=== S28.1 and S28.2 ===
Section 28.1 and Section 28.2 lay out the definition of moral rights infringement. Infringement includes any act or omission that is contrary to the moral rights of the author in general. The integrity of the work is infringed if it is to the prejudice of the honour or reputation of the author; distorted, mutilated or otherwise modified; or used in association with a product, service, cause or institution (known as the right of association). It is not an infringement of the moral work to physically change the location of the work or to restore or preserve the work in good faith.

=== S34(2) ===
Section 34(2) lays out the civil remedies for moral rights infringement and includes: all remedies by way of injunction, damages, accounts, delivery up and otherwise that are or may be conferred by law for the infringement of a right.

=== Berne Convention ===
Article 6bis of the Berne Convention, to which Canada is a party, grants moral rights, which are codified similar to the Canadian Copyright Act above. There are rights to authorship, integrity of the work, the moral rights persist as long as the economic rights to copyright, and the rights can pass on to the after death of the author if the ratifying state permits. Remedies are also governed by the ratifying state.

== Canadian case law ==
There has been very little Canadian case law on the subject of moral rights and therefore many of the interpretations of the provisions in the act have yet to be determined. Two cases are discussed below. Théberge speaks to the difference between economic and moral rights, and Snow lays out a test to determine whether prejudice to the honour or reputation of the author has occurred.

=== Théberge v. Galerie d'Art du Petit Champlain Inc. ===
In Théberge, a 2002 decision of the Supreme Court of Canada, the plaintiff was an artist who sold paintings that were printed on poster paper. The defendant bought one of the posters and, using a specialized process, transferred the physical ink from the poster to a canvas. The main question in the case was whether there was copyright infringement. Justice Ian Binnie writing for the majority stated that there was a distinction between economic and moral rights:

"The economic rights are based on a conception of artistic and literary works essentially as articles of commerce."

Whereas moral rights are derived from the civil law tradition:

"They treat the artist's oeuvre as an extension of his or her personality, possessing a dignity which is deserving of protection. They focus on the artist's right (which by s. 14.1(2) is not assignable, though it may be waived) to protect throughout the duration of the economic rights (even where these have been assigned elsewhere) both the integrity of the work and his or her authorship of it (or anonymity, as the author wishes)."

Justice Binnie went on to say that moral rights are infringed if the work is modified to the prejudice of the honour or reputation of the author [s. 28.2(1)]. The logical implication from this provision is that modifications to the work that do not prejudice the honour or reputation of the author are within the rights of the copyright owner. Binnie concluded that the plaintiff in this case was attempting to pass off an economic right as a moral right. That is, the plaintiff was attempting to prevent the defendants from accessing a different market (economic incentive) by arguing that they were infringing his moral rights. Therefore, the majority of the Supreme Court of Canada held in favour of the defendant.

Justice Charles Gonthier in dissent held that the court not only needed to consider the infringement of moral rights but also the change in the medium of the painting [prohibited by section 3.(1)] and the change in the physical structure of the work [prohibited by section 28.2(3)].

=== Snow v. the Eaton Centre Ltd. et al. ===
In Snow, a 1982 case at the Ontario High Court of Justice, the defendant had purchased a sculpture of 60 geese that they placed inside their shopping centre. During their Christmas celebration the defendant tried to attach ribbons to the necks of the geese. The plaintiff alleged that the addition of the ribbons modified his work in a manner prejudicial to his honour or reputation.

Justice O'Brien held that moral rights give the plaintiff greater rights than rights based on libel or slander and that moral rights are not unconstitutional. He also stated that prejudice is measured subjectively by the author and found for the plaintiff in this case:

"I believe the words 'prejudicial to his honour or reputation' in s. 12(7) involve a certain subjective element or judgment on the part of the author so long as it is reasonably arrived at." [Note s.12(7) refers to previous Copyright Act]

Therefore, the test for the subjective prejudice to the honour or reputation of the author is to be measured by the author, so long as it is reasonably arrived at.

== Academic commentary ==
Academic commentary on moral rights differs. One perspective holds that moral rights allow an author to maintain and promote his or her creativity. This stems out of a notion that an author is intimately tied with his or her work.

Another perspective holds that allowing authors to protect their artwork may in fact damage artistic creation by preventing modification or in some case destruction of an artwork. Which position is correct is unclear, however, it is a fact that there is only a small amount of case law concerning moral rights. Furthermore, the statutory language around moral rights is ambiguous, and it is conceivable that moral rights may come into contention with fair dealings provisions, in which case a balancing of an author's moral rights and a user's fair dealing rights is necessary.

== See also ==
- Moral rights
- Moral rights (in the US)
- Defamation
