= Freeman-Maloy v Marsden =

- Court: Ontario Court of Appeal
- Full case name: Freeman-Maloy v. Marsden et al., (2006) 208 O.A.C. 307 (CA)
- Decided: March 12, 2006
- Citations: (2006), 208 O.A.C. 307 (CA)

Case history
- Appealed to: Supreme Court of Canada

Court membership
- Judges sitting: Goudge, Sharpe and LaForme, JJ.A.

Within case law, Freeman-Maloy v Marsden was a Canadian court case that revolves around a plaintiff, York University student Daniel Freeman-Maloy, who held two protests at York University regarding the Israeli–Palestinian conflict, disrupting classes. In response Lorna Marsden, president of York University, suspended Freeman-Maloy for three years without a tribunal hearing. Freeman-Maloy applied to the courts for judicial review of Marsden's decision.

The case's litigation revolved around sorting out under which heads of law, if any, Freeman-Maloy could validly pursue Marsden. The case subsequently settled out of court.

== Justiciability ==
A tort is an action taken by a party who claims to have been wronged, to recover the damages sustained from the party who did the alleged wrongdoing. The tort of misfeasance in public office is based in the idea that those who hold public office and exercise public functions are subject to the law and must not abuse their powers to the detriment of the ordinary citizen. In this matter's hearing before two courts, a preliminary question was at issue: is it reasonable to think that the office of the president of a university might be a public office within the meaning of this particular tort?

This question was based in Marsden's allegation that, because it is plain and obvious that her office as president could not be such a public office, Freeman-Maloy's action should be dismissed on its face. Freeman-Maloy argued that, on the contrary, such a thing was not plain and obvious, and that his suit against Marsden was therefore sufficiently serious that it should be permitted in court of law.

An April 14, 2005 decision at the Superior Court found that Marsden was correct, as it was "plain and obvious" that her office as president of York University did not constitute a public office. On March 31, 2006, however, the Court of Appeal for Ontario overruled that decision, finding that because the matter of whether Marsden did indeed hold such an office was not "plain and obvious", the question of misfeasance in public office was more properly addressed at trial. The Supreme Court of Canada denied leave to appeal on September 14, 2006. Whether or not Dr. Marsden held a public office within the meaning of this particular tort, and whether or not she was eligible to be sued for civil damages to Mr. Freeman-Maloy under that heading, was therefore to be determined at trial.

== Settlement ==
On May 3, 2007, the parties reached an out-of-court settlement. Among the terms of the settlement were each party's legal undertaking to maintain the confidentiality of all terms of the settlement.
