= Michael Snow =

Canadian artist (1928–2023)

Michael Snow CC RCA
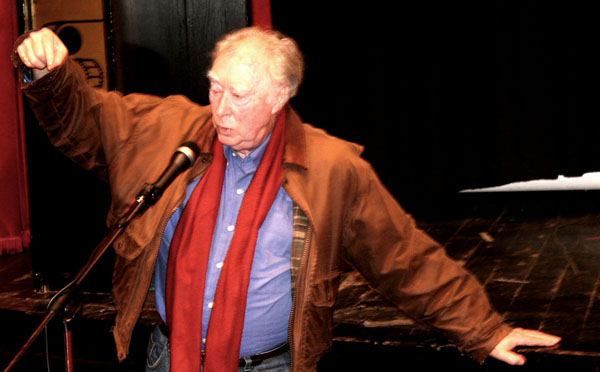
- Snow in 2007
- Born: Michael James Aleck Snow; December 10, 1928; Toronto, Ontario, Canada
- Died: January 5, 2023 (aged 94); Toronto, Ontario, Canada
- Education: Ontario College of Art
- Known for: Installation artist, filmmaker, painter
- Notable work: Wavelength (1967) ↔ (1969); La Région Centrale (1971); Flight Stop (1979); *Corpus Callosum (2002)
- Movement: Structural film
- Spouses: Joyce Wieland (m. 1956; div. 1976); Peggy Gale (m. 1990)
- Children: 1
- Awards: Officer, Order of Canada; 1981; Companion, Order of Canada; 1997; Chevalier d'ordre des Arts et des Lettres, France; 1995; Governor General's Award in Visual and Media Arts; 2000; Honorary Doctorate, Université de Paris I Panthéon-Sorbonne; 2004; Honorary Doctorate, Université du Québec à Chicoutimi; 2016

Michael James Aleck Snow CC RCA (December 10, 1928 – January 5, 2023) was a Canadian artist who worked in a range of media including film, installation, sculpture, photography, and music. His best-known films are Wavelength (1967) and La Région Centrale (1971), with the former regarded as a milestone in avant-garde cinema.

== Life ==
Michael James Aleck Snow was born in Toronto on December 10, 1928. He studied at Upper Canada College and the Ontario College of Art. He had his first solo exhibition in 1957. Snow exhibited with the Isaacs Gallery in Toronto throughout the 1960s, becoming even more involved with the gallery upon his return to Toronto in 1971. In the early 1960s, Snow moved to New York with his wife, artist Joyce Wieland, where they remained for nearly a decade. For Snow this move resulted in a proliferation of creative ideas and connections and his work increasingly gained recognition. He returned to Canada in the early 1970s "an established figure, multiply defined as a visual artist, a filmmaker, and a musician."

His work has appeared at exhibitions across Europe, North America and South America. Snow's works were included in the shows marking the reopening of both the Centre Pompidou in Paris in 2000 and the MoMA in New York in 2005. In March 2006, his works were included in the Whitney Biennial.

Snow's first wife was fellow artist Joyce Wieland, whom he married in 1956. The couple moved to New York City in 1963, but they moved back to Toronto about a decade later and divorced in 1976. In 1990, he married curator and writer Peggy Gale, and they had one son. He was the uncle of filmmaker and video artist Su Rynard.

Snow died from pneumonia in Toronto on January 5, 2023, at the age of 94. His papers are in the E.P. Taylor Research Library & Archives, Art Gallery of Ontario, Toronto.

== Work ==
=== Films ===
Snow is considered one of the most influential experimental filmmakers of all time. Annette Michelson, in writing about Snow, his 1967 film Wavelength, and his films in general, speaks of the impact of Snow's films, placing viewers in a "position to more fully understand the particular impact of Snow's filmic work from 1967 on, to discern the reasons for the large consensus given" to Wavelength when it was honoured with the Grand Prize at the 1967 Experimental Film Festival EXPRMNTL 4 in Knokke, Belgium, and that "Wavelength, [appears] as a celebration of the 'apparatus' and a confirmation of the status of the subject, and it is in those terms that we may begin to comprehend the profound effect it had upon the broadest spectrum of viewers...." Wavelength has been the subject of numerous retrospectives internationally. Film scholar Scott MacDonald says of Snow that "[f]ew filmmakers have had as large an impact on the recent avant-garde film scene as Canadian Michael Snow, whose Wavelength is probably the most frequently discussed 'structural' film."

Wavelength has been designated and preserved as a masterwork by the Audio-Visual Preservation Trust of Canada and was named #85 in the 2001 Village Voice critics' list of the 100 Best Films of the 20th Century .

Snow's films have premiered in film festivals worldwide and five of his films have premiered at the Toronto International Film Festival (TIFF). In 2000, TIFF commissioned Snow, along with Atom Egoyan and David Cronenberg, to make a series of short films collectively titled Preludes, for the 25th Anniversary of the festival.

In his Village Voice review of Snow's 2002 film *Corpus Callosum, J. Hoberman writes that Snow's films are "[r]igorously predicated on irreducible cinematic facts [and] Snow's structuralist epics—Wavelength and La Région Centrale—[announce] the imminent passing of the film era. Rich with new possibilities, *Corpus Callosum heralds the advent of the next. Whatever it is, it cannot be too highly praised." *Corpus Callossum was screened at the Toronto, Berlin, Rotterdam, and Los Angeles film festivals amongst others. In January 2003, Snow won the Los Angeles Film Critics Association's Douglas Edwards Experimental/Independent Film/Video Award for *Corpus Callosum.

=== Music ===
Originally a professional jazz musician, Snow has a long-standing interest in improvised music, as indicated by the soundtrack to his film New York Eye and Ear Control. As a pianist, he has performed solo and with other musicians in North America, Europe and Japan. Snow performed regularly in Canada and internationally, often with the improvisational music ensemble CCMC and has released more than a half dozen albums since the mid-1970s. In 1987, Snow issued The Last LP (Art Metropole), which purported to be a documentary recording of the dying gasps of ethnic musical cultures from around the globe including Tibet, Syria, India, China, Brazil, Finland and elsewhere, with thousands of words of pseudo-scholarly supplementary notes, but was, in fact, a series of multi-tracked recordings of Snow himself, who gave the joke away only in a single column of text in the disc's gatefold jacket, printed backwards and readable in a mirror. One track, purported to be a document of a coming-of-age ritual from Niger, is a pastiche of Whitney Houston's song "How Will I Know."

Snow, with Richard Serra, James Tenney and Bruce Nauman, performed Steve Reich's Pendulum Music on May 27, 1969 at the Whitney Museum of American Art.

=== Other media ===
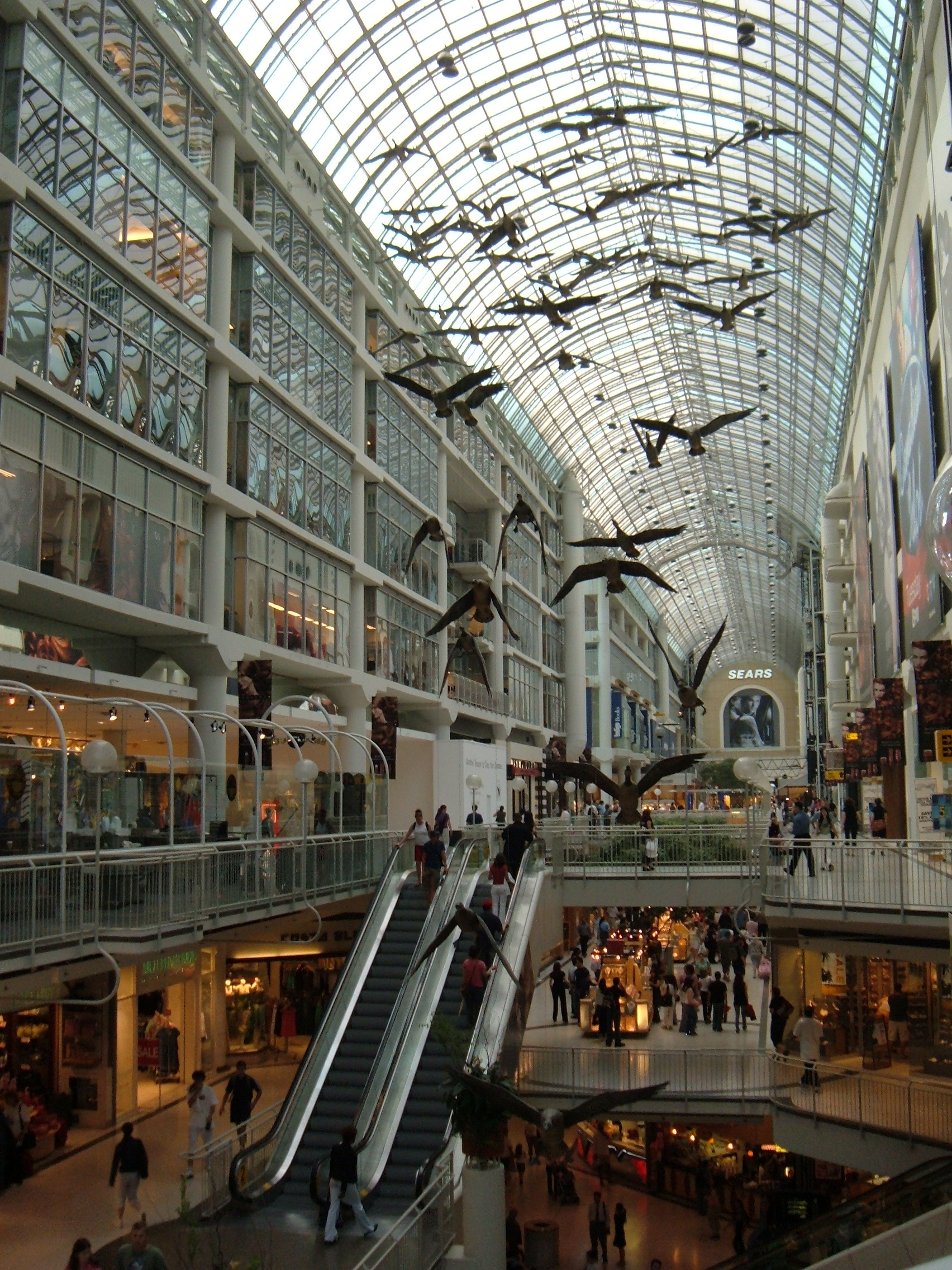
Interior of the Eaton Centre showing one of Michael Snow's best known sculptures Flight Stop, which depict Canada geese in flight.

Before Snow moved to New York in 1963, he began a long-term project that for six years would be his trademark: the Walking Woman. Martha Langford in Michael Snow: Life & Work describes this work as employing a single form that offered an infinite number of creative possibilities, the figure itself perceived variably as "a positive (a presence to be looked at) and a negative (an absence to be looked through)." His 1962 work Four to Five consisted of a grid of photographs of the Walking Woman placed in Toronto streets and subway stations, inviting the viewer to consider how public space transforms the sculpture.

Langford identifies duality as a guiding principle in Snow’s work. By combining materials and methods Snow creates hybrid objects that often defy classification. A work which exemplifies Snow's testing of stylistic boundaries is his 1979 installation Flight Stop (also titled Flightstop), a site-specific work in Toronto's Eaton Centre mall, which looks like a sculptural representation of sixty geese, but is in fact an intricate combination of fibreglass forms and photographs of a single goose.

In 1982, Snow sued the corporate owner of the Toronto Eaton Centre for violating his moral rights by altering Flight Stop. In the landmark case Snow v Eaton Centre Ltd, the Ontario High Court of Justice affirmed the artist's right to the integrity of their work. The operator of the Toronto Eaton Centre was found liable for violating Michael Snow's moral rights by putting Christmas bows on the work.

Snow's works have been in Canadian pavilion at world fairs since his Walking Women sculpture was exhibited at Expo 67 in Montréal. He was chosen to represent Canada at the Venice Biennale in 1970; this was the first solo exhibition held at the Biennale's Canadian Pavilion. His bookwork BIOGRAPHIE of the Walking Woman / de la femme qui marche 1961-1967 (2004) was published in Brussels by La Lettre vole. It consists of images of the public appearances of his globally famous icon.

Anarchive2: Digital Snow describes Michael Snow as "one of the most significant artists in contemporary art and cinema of the past 50 years." This 2002 DVD was initiated by Paris' Centre Pompidou and was produced with the support of la foundation Daniel Langlois, Université de Paris, Heritage Canada, the Canada Council, Téléfilm Canada and Montreal’s Époxy. It is an encyclopedia of Snow's works across media, browsed in a manner inimitably and artfully created by Snow. Its 4,685 entries include film clips, sculpture, photographs, audio and musical clips, and interviews.

== Retrospectives and honours ==
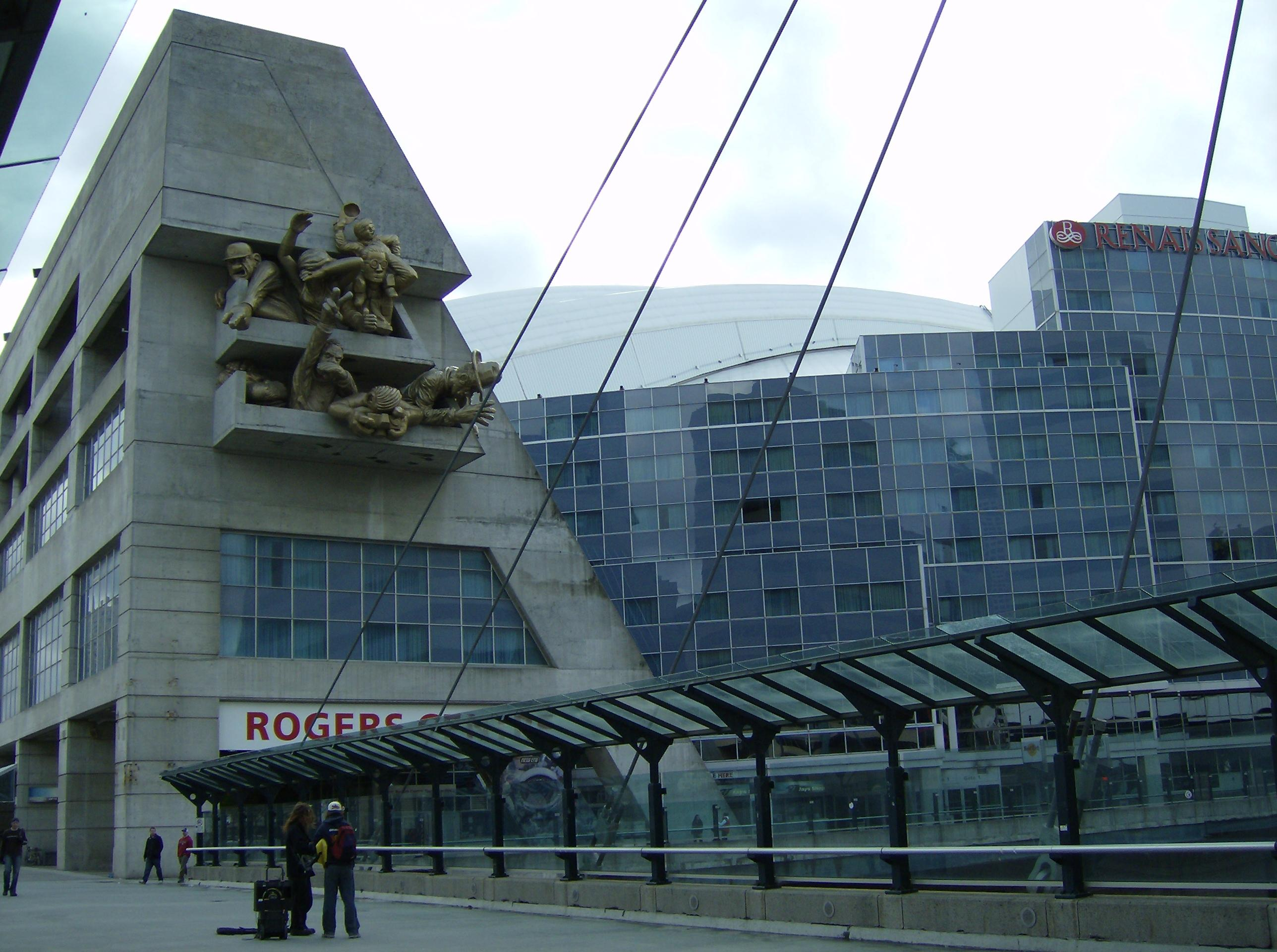
In the background you can see multiple stadium sculptures on the eastern side of Skydome Rogers Centre.

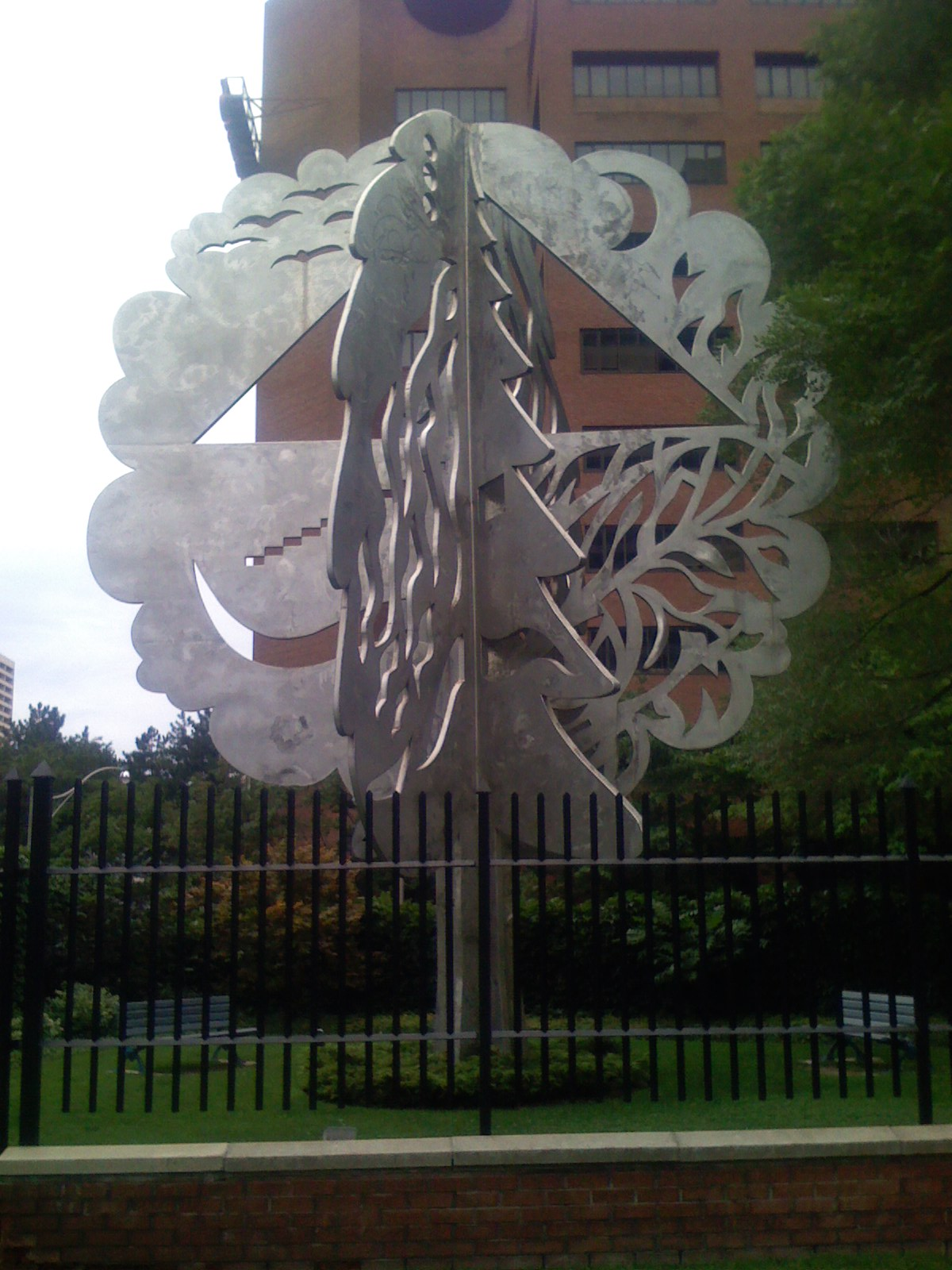
Michael Snow's sculpture 'Red, Orange and Green' (1992) at Rogers Building (Canada)

In 1993, The Michael Snow Project, lasting several months, was a multivenue retrospective of Snow’s works in Toronto exhibited at several public venues and at the Art Gallery of Ontario and The Power Plant. Concurrently his works were the subjects of four books published by Alfred A. Knopf Canada. Snow has shown internationally in both galleries and cinemas, including a retrospective of his work at the British Film Institute, London where his celluloid works were shown in the cinemas and his digital works in the gallery (The BFI Gallery). The project, titled 'Yes Snow Show', took place in 2009 and was co-curated by Elisabetta Fabrizi and Chris Meigh-Andrew.

In 1981, he was made an Officer of the Order of Canada and was promoted to Companion in 2007 "for his contributions to international visual arts as one of Canada's greatest multidisciplinary contemporary artists". In 2000, he was one of the seven first winners of the Governor General’s Award in Visual and Media Arts.

In 2004, the Université de Paris I, Panthéon-Sorbonne awarded him an honorary doctorate. In 2006, Lima's Museum of Art (MALI) held a selective retrospective exhibition as well as a screening of his films in Peru, as part of the Vide/Art/Electronic Festival.

=== Honorary degrees ===
Université de Paris I, Panthéon-Sorbonne (2004), Emily Carr Institute, Vancouver (2004) Nova Scotia College of Art and Design, Halifax (1990), University of Toronto (1999), University of Victoria (1997), Brock University (1975).

=== Academic appointments ===
- Visiting Artist/Professor at MAPS (Master of Art in Public Sphere), Ecole Cantonale d'Art du Valais, Sierre, Switzerland (February 2005, January 2006)
- Visiting Artist/Professor at L'école Nationale Supérieure d'Art de Bourges, France (December 2004, May 2005)
- Visiting Artist/Professor, École nationale supérieure des Beaux-Arts, Paris, 2001
- Visiting Artist/Professor, le Fresnoy, Tourcoing France, 1997-1998
- Visiting Professor, l'Ecole Nationale de la Photographie, Arles France, 1996
- Visiting Professor, Princeton University, 1988
- Professor of Advanced Film, Yale University, 1970
- CCMC artists in residence, La Chartreuse, Avignon Festival, France, 1981

=== Other awards ===
- Gershon Iskowitz Prize, 2011
- Los Angeles Film Critics Association Award for Independent/Experimental Film and Video Award for "*Corpus Callosum", 2002
- Queen's Golden Jubilee Medal, 2002
- Governor General’s Award in Visual and Media Arts, 2000, first recipient
- Chevalier de l'ordre des arts et des lettres, France, 1995
- Los Angeles Film Critics Association Award for Independent/Experimental Film and Video Award for "So Is This", 1983
- Guggenheim Fellowship, 1972
- Grand Pix of the Knokke Experimental Film Festival for "Wavelength", 1967
- Member, Royal Canadian Academy of Arts

== Major installations ==
- "The Windows Suite" is a permanent installation consisting of 32 varied sequences of images, which are presented on 65" plasma screens in 7 of the windows of the façade of the Toronto Pantages Hotel and Spa and related condo buildings facing Victoria Street in central Toronto. Some of these sequences one might possibly glimpse in the windows of a sophisticated hotel, condo, spa and parking garage building, but many sequences are "impossible," e.g. in one sequence fish swim from window to window. This installation was opened as an official event of the Toronto International Film Festival September 2006.
- Flight Stop - Toronto Eaton Centre a collection of life sized Canada geese in flight hanging over the main section of the mall. In 1982, the installation was the subject of a leading Canadian court decision on moral rights, Snow v. The Eaton Centre Ltd.
- The Audience (1989) - SkyDome (now Rogers Centre in Toronto) is a collection of larger than life depictions of fans located above the northeast and northwest entrances. Painted gold, the sculptures show fans in various acts of celebration.

== Filmography ==
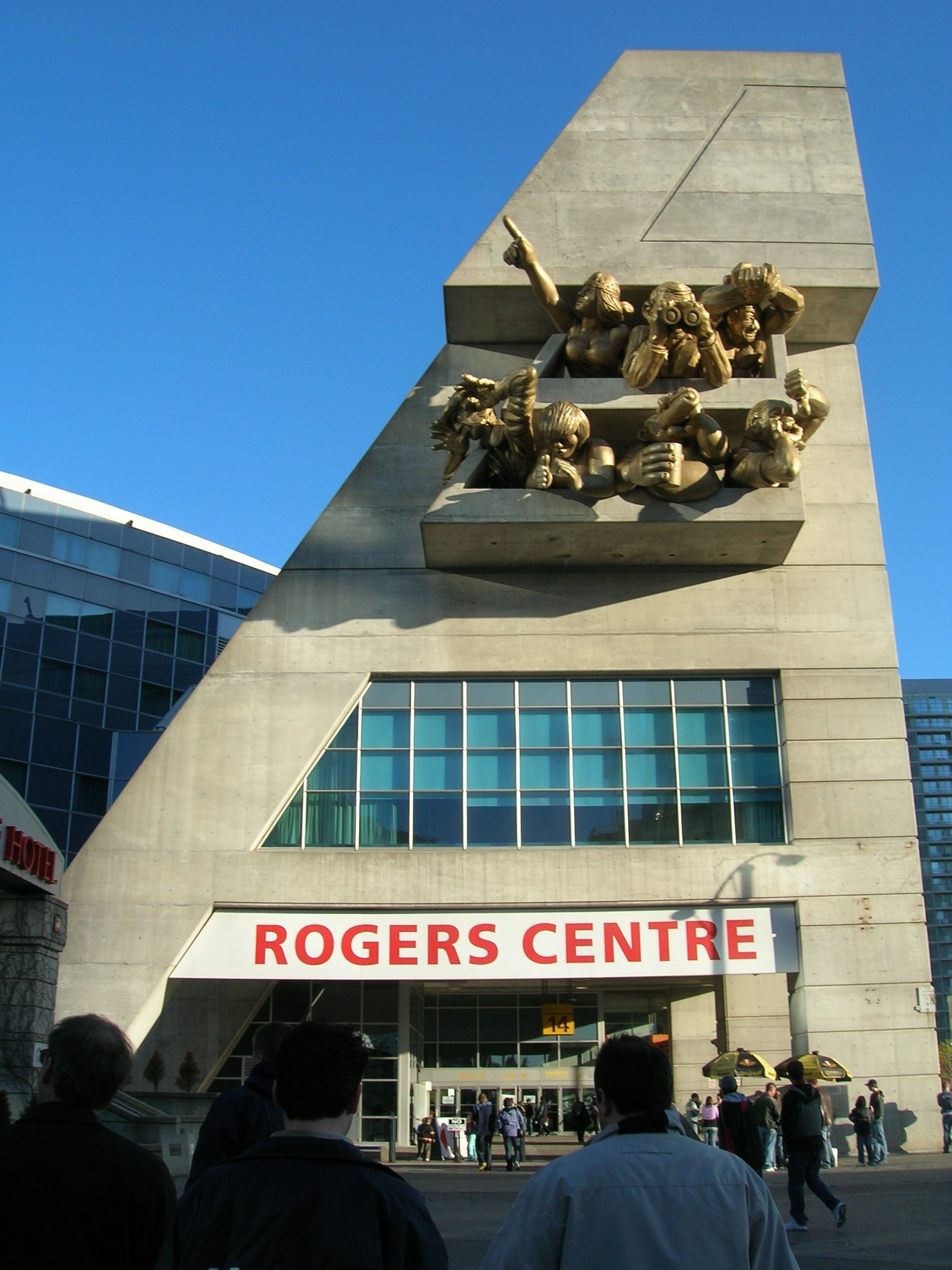
The Audience sculpture adorning the facade on the northwest corner of Rogers Centre stadium in Toronto. This photo only shows half of the art installation. The other set is located above the north east corner of the building, and is of similar size and configuration.

- A to Z (1956)
- New York Eye and Ear Control (1964)
- Short Shave (1965)
- Wavelength (1967)
- Standard Time (1967)
- One Second in Montreal (1969)
- Dripping Water (with Joyce Wieland, 1969)
- <--→ or Back and Forth (1969)
- Side Seat Paintings Slides Sound Film (1970)
- La Région Centrale (1971)
- Two Sides to Every Story (double 16mm installation, 1974)
- "Rameau's Nephew" by Diderot (Thanx to Dennis Young) by Wilma Schoen (1974)
- Breakfast (Table Top Dolly) (1976)
- Presents (1981)
- So Is This (1982)
- Seated Figures (1988)
- See You Later (1990)
- To Lavoisier, Who Died in the Reign of Terror (1991)
- Prelude (2000)
- The Living Room (2000)
- Solar Breath (2002)
- *Corpus Callosum (2002)
- WVLNT ("Wavelength For Those Who Don't Have the Time") (2003)
- Triage (2004), with Carl Brown
- SSHTOORRTY (2005)
- Reverberlin (2006)
- Puccini Conservato (2008)
- Cityscape (2019)
