= Claude Léveillée =

Canadian actor, pianist and singer-songwriter

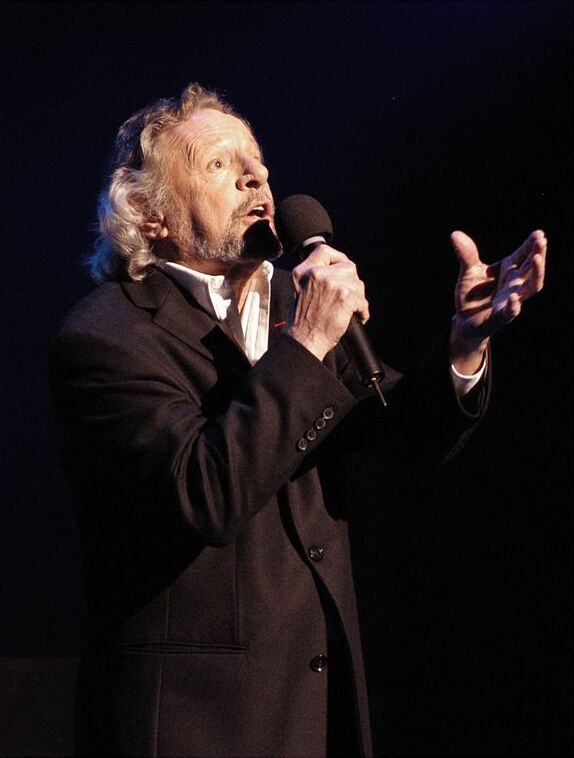
- Claude Léveillée at Montreal's Francofolies, by Victor Diaz Lamich, October 2006.

Background information
- Born: Joseph Gérard Adolphe Claude Léveillée; 16 October 1932; Montreal, Canada
- Died: 9 June 2011 (aged 78) Mirabel, Quebec; Canada
- Genre: Comedy
- Occupations: Actor; pianist; composer; singer-songwriter
- Instruments: Piano; guitar; drums
- Years active: 1956–2004

Claude Léveillée (16 October 1932 – 9 June 2011) was a Canadian actor, pianist, and singer-songwriter who composed more than 400 songs, instrumental pieces, and musicals.

In 1959, Léveillée co-founded Les Bozos, an informal collective of Quebec chansonniers. He notably collaborated with Édith Piaf, writing several songs for her, including "Les Vieux Pianos," "Ouragan," and "Boulevard du Crime." He also composed for a number of Quebec artists, including Julie Arel—"Merci à toi" (1976)—and Nicole Martin, with songs such as "Il est en nous l'amour" (1985), "Mon père et ma mère," and "On s’aimera" (both 1987). Léveillée performed widely, with appearances in France, the Soviet Union, Belgium, Switzerland, and Japan. His acting credits include roles in the film Line of Demarcation (1966) and the television series Scoop (1991–1994).

== Biography ==
=== Youth ===
Joseph Gérard Adolphe Claude Léveillée was born on 16 October 1932 in Montreal. His parents were Pierre Léveillée (1901–1992) and Laurette Lalande (1901–1995).

Léveillée's mother was a pianist and his father was a tenor. In addition to the piano, Claude also played the accordion and harmonica. He began performing with the accordion on the streets of Montreal.

=== Education ===
Claude Léveillée enrolled at the Collège André-Grasset in 1947, then at the Collège de Montréal in 1951. During school, he sometimes played a Contessa accordion.

In 1954, at 21 and with a Bachelor of Arts degree from the classical course, he enrolled at the Université de Montréal in economics, politics, and social sciences. Here he discovered an old piano at the university, whose music led him to meet the actress Élizabeth Chouvalidzé.

=== Early musical career ===
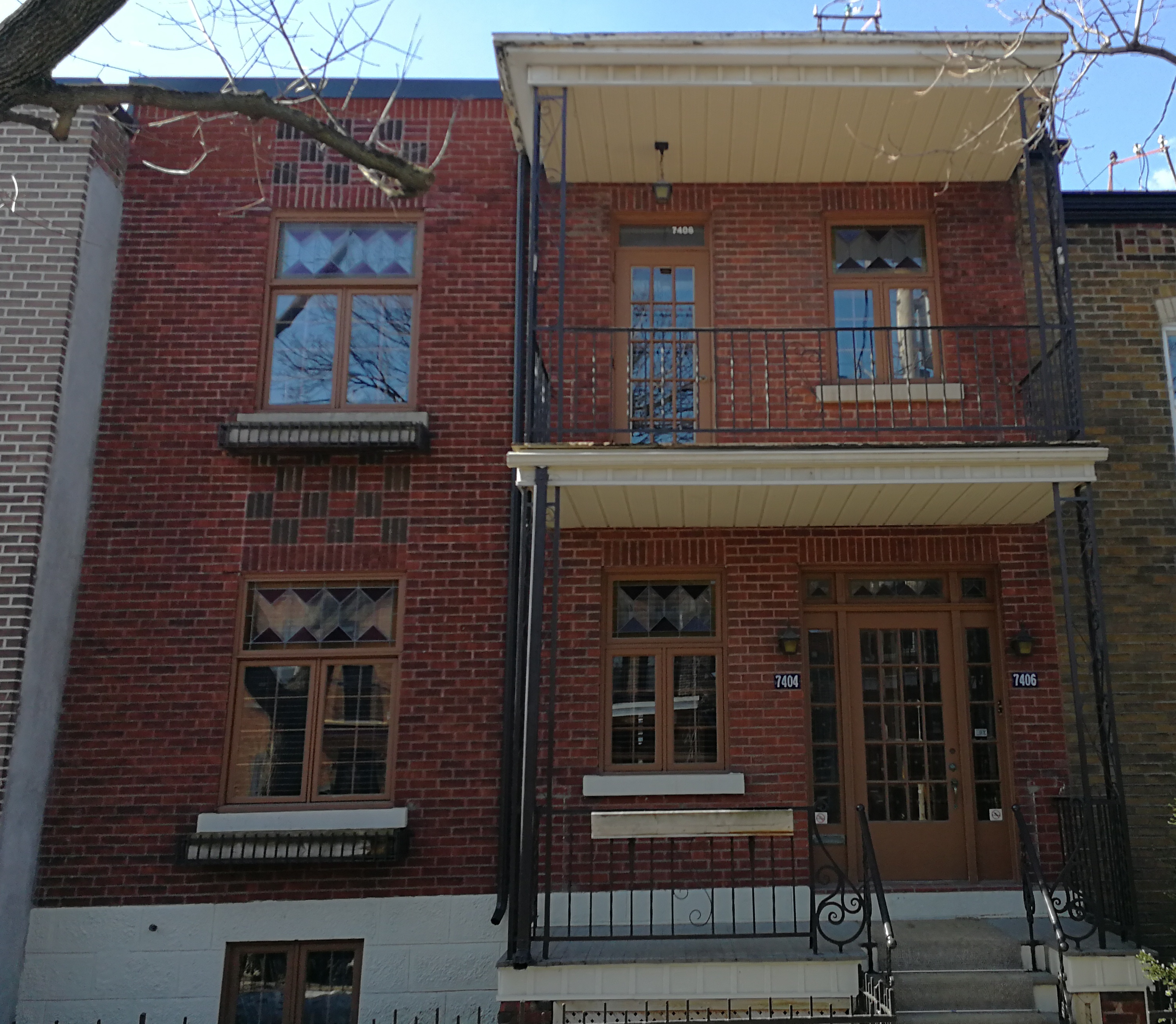
Birthplace of Léveillée in the Villeray district of Montreal

In October 1955, Léveillée and Élizabeth Chouvalidzé appeared on stage at the Université de Montréal in the magazine Bleu et Or, to perform a number by Gilbert Bécaud and Liberace. He was noticed by Noël Gauvin, director of the TV show Music-hall. Gauvin later approached Léveillée to compose the song Montréal for the singer Andrée D'Amour.

In late 1954, Claude Léveillée started combining his poetry with his music. In 1955, he created his first song, "Tes Rêves". It was entered in the Chœur Bleu et Or competition at the Université de Montréal. He appeared in Music-Hall, where he performed some of his songs. At the university's cantina, Élizabeth and Claude auditioned for extra roles at Société Radio-Canada. They met Claude Caron, who remembered Léveillée's accordion performances. Caron offered him the role of Bozo in Père Ambroise Lafortune's television series La Rivière perdue.

After two years, he dropped out of university and the social sciences. In 1956, he played in "Le Secret de la rivière perdue" on Radio-Canada Television; he also created a character for children, Clo-Clo (sets, script, text, and music) on the "Domino" program (1957–59, 1961–62).

In 1956, Léveillée met Paul Buissonneau at the École des beaux-arts de Montréal, where he was in charge of the musical score for the 1956 revival of Orion le tueur at the Centre Saint-André-Apôtre. Boissonneau offered Léveillée the opportunity to open the next play he staged, La Tour Eiffel qui tue, presented from 4 to 9 March 1957 at the Salles du Gesù in Montreal and on 25 May in Edmonton. In 1957, Claude Léveillée created the soundtrack for La Belle Rombière by Guillaume Hanoteau and Jean Clevers. In 1958, he played the lead role in Marcel Aymé's play Les Oiseaux de lune.

In 1959, he co-founded Les Bozos with six other young Quebec chansonniers. That same year, he entered one of his songs ("Les vieux pianos") in the third edition of the Canadian Song Contest. This song, selected as one of the twelve finalists, was recorded shortly afterwards by Micheline Manseau to a honky-tonk piano rhythm ("[...] vous n'êtes plus de notre temps [...]") and was Léveillée's first recording.

==== Collaborations with Édith Piaf ====
On 12 June 1959, Édith Piaf went to the cabaret Chez Bozo where she met Léveillée. She then invited him to come and compose songs for her in Paris in August 1959. Later that year, Léveillée collaborated with Piaf in the documentary 67 bis boulevard Lannes, directed by Jean-Claude Labrecque. He returned to Quebec in 1960. Édith Piaf recorded several of the songs he had written for her (including "Boulevard du crime", "Ouragan", and "Le Vieux piano", a version of Les Vieux pianos featuring a third person), then died in 1963.

=== 1960s and 1970s ===
In 1961, Léveillée became the artistic director of the small boîte à chansons, Le Chat Noir, in Montreal, where he hired Gilles Vigneault. Léveillée obtained several of Vigneault's texts (some of them written in his presence) to set to music and composed some thirty of them, including "Le bout du monde", "Le chemin de prairie", "Il en est passé", "Avec nos yeux", and "L'hiver", which was sung by Monique Leyrac. In France, Claude Léveillée won the Grand Prix du disque canadien de la radio de CKAC in 1962.

In 1963, he played the musical role in Paul Buissonneau's show Les Éphémères, with Yvon Deschamps and Jean-Louis Millette, among others. The show was cancelled, but Léveillée still recorded the music he had composed for it. Later, for Louis-Georges Carrier, director of the Théâtre de la Marjolaine, Léveillée wrote the music for several musicals, including "Doux temps des amours". On 23 April 1963, with Paul Buissonneau, Yvon Deschamps, and Jean-Louis Millette, he co-founded the Théâtre de Quat'Sous.

Léveillée was the first Quebec singer to perform alone at Place des Arts (in 1964). He won the Grand Prix du Disque in 1966. On 21 May 1967, he performed the song "Le rendez-vous" on the American Ed Sullivan Show, broadcast live from Montreal on the occasion of the World's Fair held there at the time.

In 1968, accompanied by André Gagnon, Léveillée performed 26 recitals in the USSR. In the 1960s, he produced The Old Pianos, Frédéric, The Legend of the White Horse, "Le Rendez-vous" (lyrics by Gilles Vigneault), The Scene, Emmène-moi au bout du monde, and Soir d'hiver (poem by Émile Nelligan).

In the early 1970s, he produced songs such as "L'étoile d'Amérique", "Cheval de bois", "Si jamais" and "Marie Rose". In 1972, he represented Canada at the Sopot Song Festival in Poland. The same year, he returned on tour to the USSR.

In 1976, he gave a series of concerts at Place des Arts, participated in the "5 grands sur la montagne" show (Une fois cinq), and presented a few concerts with Félix Leclerc on Île d'Orléans (Le temps d'une saison). That same year, he gave Julie Arel the song Merci à toi. In 1978 and 1979, he gave way to instrumental music with Black Sun and Escale 80.

=== 1980s ===
In 1980, he lost his only child, Pascal, who died at the age of 20. Léveillée embarked on a tour in 1980, beginning at the Théâtre de Quat'Sous in the fall. In 1982, he released a new album of songs featuring "Le coyote", "La grande vie", and "Les fils de la liberté". He toured Switzerland from 1981 to 1984. Accompanied by Claude Gauthier and Pierre Létourneau, Léveillée took part in the Trois fois chantera tour in Quebec in 1984.

In 1985, he presented the commemorative show Tu t'rappelles Frédéric with his friend André Gagnon. In the same year, he took part in the Fondation Québec-Afrique, singing in the collective project "Les Yeux de la faim". He also composed the song "Il est en nous l'amour" for Nicole Martin, with a text by Pierre Létourneau. The song was nominated at the ADISQ gala the following year. In August 1986, he married Hélène LeTendre LeBlond in Lutry, Switzerland. She was a journalist, columnist, and Quebec TV host. They remained married until Claude's death in 2011.

In 1986, Léveillée began a series of instrumental concerts titled Un homme, un piano. In 1987, he shared the stage with Renée Claude for a few concerts under the title Partenaires dans le crime, then wrote the songs "On s'aimera" and "Mon père et ma mère" for which Nicole Martin joined as a backing vocalist. In 1988, McDonald's restaurants used his song, Frédéric, for the Quebec adaptation of the advertising campaign around the character Mac Tonight, renamed Pierrot McDo. In 1989, he released the album Enfin revivre.

=== 1990's to 2000's ===
In the early 1990's, Léveillée landed the role of businessman and press magnate Émile Rousseau in the TV series Scoop, for which he also composed the musical score. In 1994, he recorded the album Mes années 60. He went on to produce three albums: Rêves inachevés (1998), Rêves inachevés vol 2 (1999), and Nonstop le rebel (2000).

On stage, he continued to perform at the Place des Arts in 1994, 1997 and 2003. He also appeared briefly in George Mihalka's L'Homme idéal and Michel Poulette's La Conciergerie. He returned to television in 2002, playing a mentally ill former teacher in the TV series Tabou.

On 27 April 2004, on stage at the age of 71, he suffered his first stroke, followed by a second on 20 October, leaving him severely disabled. After a stay in the hospital and some rehabilitation, he was taken home at his request and remained there.

In 2008, the second and final volume of his biography was published; the following year, the Bibliothèque et Archives nationaux du Québec (BAnQ) acquired the Claude Léveillée archive. The fund is still kept there.

=== Death ===
On 5 May 2011, the Mouvement national des Québécoises et Québécois presented Guy Latraverse and the artisans of the 1 fois 5 show with the "Artisan de la Fête nationale du Québec 2011" award to mark the 35th anniversary of the concert. Claude did not attend the press conference due to his poor health, his last public appearance before his death was through his video testimonial.

On 4 June 2011, Claude Léveillée suffered a third stroke at home and lost his speech. On 9 June 2011, he died of a cerebral hemorrhage at the age of 78.

His funeral was on 18 June 2011 at Montreal's Notre-Dame Basilica (with a capacity of 1,500 people). The ceremony, conducted by Father Raymond Gravel, was broadcast live on RDI, with André Gagnon at the piano. On the day of his funeral, the flag at the Parliament Building in Quebec was lowered to half-mast. The day before, the public was invited to march near the coffin at Place des Arts. Claude Léveillée was then taken to Notre-Dame-des-Neiges Cemetery, where he was laid to rest beside his parents and son.

== Discography ==
Claude Léveillée's musical and poetic work is distinguished by its lyricism.

=== Albums ===
- 1962 Claude Léveillée (Columbia, FL-289)
- 1963 Claude Léveillée (Columbia, FL-303)
- 1963 Clo-Clo on the Farm (Harmonie, HFL-8001)
- 1964 Claude Léveillée in Paris (Columbia, FL-318)
- 1964 Christmas with Clo-Clo (Harmonie, HFL-8003)
- 1965 Léveillée – Gagnon (Columbia, FL-331; Reissued in 2012, Audiogram)
- 1966 Claude Léveillée in Paris, volume 2 (Columbia, FL-339)
- 1966 Léveillée plus ten (Columbia, FL-346)
- 1967 A Private (Columbia, FL-351)
- 1967 One voice, two pianos (Columbia, FS-662; Reissued in 2014, Audiogram)
- 1967 She will turn the earth (Columbia, FS-677)
- 1970 The Star of America (Leko, KS-100)
- 1971 Claude Léveillée (Leko, KS-101)
- 1971 If ever (Leko, KS-102)
- 1971 If Ever (Leko, KS-103)
- 1972 Wooden horse (Barclay, 80125)
- 1972 Contact (Barclay, 80147)
- 1972 Clo-Clo and Bibi on vacation (Children's album made with Bernadette Morin and Gérard Manset ) (Barclay, 10021)
- 1973 The Lovers of the Year 2000 (Barclay, 80174)
- 1974 The Beautiful Sundays (Barclay, 80202)
- 1975 We go back in love (Barclay, 80216)
- 1978 Black Sun (Polydor, 2424.171)
- 1978 The Long Journey, Volume 1. (Claude Léveillée recounts the creation of his songs) (Polydor, 2457.104)
- 1979 Rally (Kébec-Disc, KDM-975)
- 1979 Escale 80 (CAM, CML-2006; Reissued in 1984 under the title Escale 84 : Amplitude, PS-2504)
- 1982 Claude Léveillée (Pro-Culture, PPC 6019)
- 1989 At Last Live Again (GMD, 1303–27; Reissued with additional titles in 1995 : Dawn, 0295CD)
- 1994 My Sixties. (New Recordings) (Aube, CD-0294)
- 1997 One man, one piano. (New Recordings) (Dawn, CD-0298).
- 1998 Unfinished Dreams (Dawn, CD2 0299)
- 1999 Blanche the Beloved (Unfinished Dreams vol. 2) (Aube, CD-2-301)
- 2000 Non-stop the rebel (Aube, AUBECCD2304)
- 2008 Heart without a country (De L'Aube, AUBECD0307)

=== Simple ===
- 1962 Frédéric – Beyond the Ages (Columbia, C4 6888)
- 1963 Frédéric – Don't say anything – With our eyes – Beyond the ages (Columbia, EP 5642)
- 1963 Taxi – I will come to die – You will have given me – Winter (Columbia, EP 5914)
- 1965 The Sweet Time of Love – Remember the Time (with Andrée Lachapelle) (Columbia, CT 33105)
- 1966 Le chemin du roy – To those who seek castles (Columbia, C4 6951)
- 1966 Chez Larry – What do I care (Columbia, C4 6977)
- 1967 Will turn the earth (with Lise Lasalle) – And then the snow came (with Andrée Lachapelle) (Columbia, C4 6988)
- 1969 For Lovers – A Long Time Ago (Columbia, C4 7024)
- 1969 If I Call Montreal – Where Does My Heart Go (Columbia, C4 7049)
- 1985 The eyes of hunger – The eyes of hunger (Fondation Québec-Afrique, collective project " The Eyes of Hunger ") (Kébec-Disc, KD-12-1985; Reissue Kébec-Disc, KD-1985)

=== Concerts ===
- 1964 Claude Léveillée at Place des Arts. (Recorded April 1964) (Columbia, FL-311)
- 1976 Place des Arts 1976. (Recorded February 1976) (The Mansion, 911–912)
- 1999 In the time of song boxes. (Performing at Butte-à-Mathieu in Val-David in 1962) (Riche-Lieu, RIC 2 9951)

=== Compilations ===
- 1968 Ten years of song (Columbia, F3S 300)
- 1969 The Ceremonial of Love (Columbia, FS-726)
- 1991 The Great Hits (Sony Music, BUK-50217; reissued in 2006 under the title "Collections": Sony BMG, 82876829452)
- 1995 My 70s (Aube, CD-0296)
- 1996 My 80s (Aube, CD-0297)
- 1997 Claude Léveillée – Émergence (Sony Musique, C2K 91057)
- 2003 My immortals, I entrust them to you (Aube, AUBECCD2305)

=== Collaborations and performances as guest artist ===
- 1965 The voice (Ballet created for Edith Piaf set to music by Claude Léveillée on a libretto by Michel Rivgauche). (Pathé, 67193)
- 1972 Life is beautiful. (Poems by Guy Godin to music by Claude Léveillée) (Barclay, 80140)
- 1974 Complicity. We don't know anymore. (Other titles by various performers). (Barclay, 80180)
- 1976 1 time 5. (With Gilles Vigneault, Jean-Pierre Ferland, Robert Charlebois and Yvon Deschamps / Recorded 21 and 23 June 1976) (Kébec-Disc, KD-923/924; Reissued in 1990 : Sound Image Management, GSI-2117; and GSI Music (2010), GSIDVD-0578)
- 1976 The time of a season. (In performance with Félix Leclerc ) (Polydor, 2675.144)
- 1979 The legend of the little gray bear / A dog's diary. (Tales for children recited by Félix Leclerc to music by Claude Léveillée,) (Polydor, 2424.196)
- 1980 I Hear You Singing. (With Gilles Vigneault, Monique Leyrac, Fabienne Thibeault, Michel Rivard, Pauline Julien and Nicole Croisille / Recorded at Place-des-Nations on 5 September 1980) (Kébec-Disc, KD-507/508)
- 1996 The memory of song boxes. Frederick. (Other titles by various performers. Recorded in May 1996 at the Spectrum in Montreal) (DisQuébec, QUÉC-2-1108)
- 1998 Gagala. Imagination. (Other titles by various performers) (Firma, FM 2 0015)
- 2000 Isabelle Boulay – Love scenes. Frédéric (duet with Isabelle Boulay) (Sidéral, SIDCD-2702)
- 2003 Marie-Denise Pelletier – The words of Eddy Marnay. The first love in the world (duet with Marie-Denise Pelletier) (Disques Victoire, VIC2-1843).

=== Tributes ===
- 1975 Claude Léveillée – Ten successes for you. (Instrumental versions, orchestrations by Gérard Manset) (1975, Barclay, 80206)
- 2005 Time for a song, time to say I love you. (Tribute disc to Claude Léveillée) (Aube, AUBECCD0306).
- Since 2013, the Studio-Théâtre de la Place des Arts in Montreal has officially become Salle Claude-Léveillée.

== Filmography ==
=== As an actor ===
==== Films ====
- 1966 The Line of Demarcation, a film by Claude Chabrol — Captain Duncan Presgrave, the Englishman
- 1989 Jesus of Montreal, a film by Denys Arcand — A professor of theology
- 1990 67 bis boulevard Lannes, a documentary by Jean-Claude Labrecque — Himself (remembrance of 1959, in Paris, at Piaf's)
- 1994 Murder in Music, a film by Gabriel Pelletier — Alex Fugères
- 1996 The Ideal Man, by George Mihalka — Colleague of Pierre
- 1997 The Caretaker's Lodge (La Conciergerie), by Michel Poulette — The publisher
- 2004 So the Moon Rises (La lune viendra d'elle-même), a film by Marie-Jan Seille and Monsieur Langlois

==== Television ====
- 1956 The Lost River, by Ambroise Lafortune (SRC) — Bozo
- 1957 The Magic Lantern (SRC)
- 1957–1959 and 1961–1962 Domino (SRC) — Tintinet, renamed Clo-Clo the clown; co-writer, scriptwriter, set designer and songwriter of hundreds of children's songs
- 1958 The Lost River : Children of the Street, drama by Réginald Boisert (SRC) — directed by Claude Caron
- 1960–1962 La Côte de sable, television novel by Marcel Dubé (SRC) — directed by Louis-Georges Carrier
- 1962 Beyond the Ages, drama by Jean-Robert Rémillard (SRC) — directed by Jean Faucher
- 1962 Absolvo te, television novel by Jean-Robert Rémillard (SRC) — directed by Jean-Robert Rémillard
- 1963 Inquisition, drama by Diego Fabbri (SRC) — directed by Louis-Georges Carrier
- 1982 In low voice, drama by Gilles Archambault (SRC) — directed by James Dormeyer
- 1983 The June Wedding (SRC)
- 1983–1985 The Promised Life, television novel by Marcel Dubé (SRC)
- 1991–1995 Scoop (SRC), series by Fabienne Larouche and Réjean Tremblay (role : Émile Rousseau, a press magnate)
- 1995 The Coffin affair (The Great Trials series) — directed by Jean-Claude Labrecque
- 2002–2003 Tabou (TVA) — television novel by Michel d'Astous and Anne Boyer — (role : Normand Bélanger, a former professor suffering from dementia)

=== As composer ===
==== Movie theater ====
- 1957 La Belle Rombière by Guillaume Hanoteau and Jean Clevers, 1951
- 1961 The Ice Rink by Gilles Carle
- 1964 Trouble-Maker (Trouble-fète) by Pierre Patry
- 1972 The Rebels (Quelques arpents de neige) by Denis Héroux
- 1974 The Beautiful Sundays by Richard Martin
- 1984 My Travels in Canada by Marc Blais (Cf. Escale 84)
- 1991 The Dance Goes On (Norstar) by Paul Almond
- 2002 Rivers of Silver by Michel Gauthier

==== Television ====
- 1962 Beyond the Ages (SRC)
- 1962 The Weather (SRC)
- 1962 Debureau (SRC)
- 1965 Kill the Fatted Calf (SRC)
- 1966 On the return of the white geese (SRC)
- 1968 Turntable (SRC)
- 1968 Virginia (SRC)
- 1968 Media (SRC)
- 1968 Manual (SRC)
- 1969 The Cell (SRC)
- 1969 Florence (SRC)
- 1969 Review (SRC)
- 1971 Of Mice and Men (SRC)
- 1971 The Two Waltzes (SRC)
- 1971 Between noon and evening (SRC)
- 1971 Friday Deadline (SRC)
- 1971 The Time of Lilacs (SRC)
- 1972 La Perdrière (SRC)
- 1972 The Shipwreck (SRC)
- 1974 The Beautiful Sundays by Richard Martin
- 1974 A woman in blue at the bottom of a rain garden (SRC)
- 1974 Cold Millionaire (SRC)
- 1974 The Pelican (SRC)
- 1980 Just a Memory (SRC)
- 1981 The Sons of Liberty (SRC)
- 1988 Good Sunday, music from the artistic chronicle (TVA)
- 1991–1995 Scoop (SRC)

=== Concerts ===
==== DVD ====
- 2005 Claude Léveillée in show. (Show "Cold Africa" presented at Place des Arts in 1977) (Zone 3, ZDVD561)
- 2010 1 time 5. (With Gilles Vigneault, Jean-Pierre Ferland, Robert Charlebois and Yvon Deschamps / Recorded 23 June 1976 in Montreal) (GSI Musique, Gsidvd0578)

=== As an actor ===
- 1957 The Eiffel Tower that kills, by Guillaume Hanoteau, 1946 (by the Théâtre de Quat'Sous, dir. Paul Buissonneau ) —
- 1958 Les Oiseaux de lune, by Marcel Aymé, 1955 (at the Théâtre de la Comédie-Canadienne ) — lead role

=== As a theater composer ===
- 1956 Orion the Killer, by Jean-Pierre Grenier and Maurice Fombeure, 1946 (at the National Drama Festival, Center Saint-André-Apôtre) — musical part of this play directed by Paul Buissonneau

=== As composer of revues or musicals ===
- 1963 Les Éphémères with a libretto by Paul Buissonneau. Submitted twice, it was ultimately never played.
- 1964 Gogo Loves You (Off-Broadway in New York), with a libretto by Anita Loos and Gladys Shelley (composed in 1961)
- 1964 Le Doux Temps des amours, libretto by Louis-Georges Carrier
- 1965 Il est une saison, libretto by Louis-Georges Carrier
- 1966 Don't miss the spy, libretto by Louis-Georges Carrier
- 1967 She will turn the Earth, libretto by Louis-Georges Carrier
- 1967 We only love once, libretto by Louis-Georges Carrier
- 1968 Noah's Ark, libretto by Louis-Georges Carrier
- 1968 Les Posters, booklet by Louis-Georges Carrier
- 1973 For five cents of love
- 1975 Summer is called Julie, libretto by Louis-Georges Carrier

=== As a composer of tales ===
- 1972 The saying of the eagle and the beaver, story by Gilles Vigneault

== Bibliography ==
- 1971 L'Étoile d'Amérique, collection of song texts by Claude Léveillée (Leméac)
- 1978 Le Long Voyage, collection of scores
- 1990 Claude Léveillée, collection of scores

== Awards and recognition ==
- 1962 – Canadian Record Grand Prize, from radio station CKAC
- 1966 – Singer-songwriter grand prize (Prix La Bolduc ) at the Record Festival
- 1977 – Prize of the Charles-Cros Academy of Paris, for the disc 1 times 5
- 1995 – Jacques-Blanchet Medal, from the Jacques Blanchet estate
- 1996 – Officer of the Order of Canada
- 1998 – Knight of the National Order of Quebec
- 1998 – Knight of the Legion of Honor of France
- 1999 – Félix tribute at the ADISQ Gala
- 2004 – Felix of the compilation of the year
- 2005 – Inducted into the Canadian Songwriters Hall of Fame, with his song Frédéric
- 2007 – Sylvain-Lelièvre Prize, for his exceptional career

== Bibliography ==
- Claude Léveillée on the trapezes of the stars, by Daniel Guérard, songs and poems*, Montreal, Ed. of Man, Coll. "Words from here", 1990, 297 p. 23 ISBN 978-2-7619-0908-2
- Thérien, Robert; D'Amours, Isabelle (1992). Dictionnaire de la musique populaire au Québec (in French). Québec: éd. Institut québécois de recherche sur la culture (IQRC). pp. xxv, 580. ISBN 2-89224-183-9.
- Chamberland, Robert; Gaulin, André (1994). La chanson québécoise de la Bolduc à aujourd'hui. Les Cahiers du Centre de recherche en littérature québécoise. Anthologie. Nuit Blanche Éditeur. p. 593. ISBN 978-2-921053-28-0.
- Le guide de la chanson québécoise [avec index]. Les guides culturels Syros (Triptyque ed.). Montréal: Paris : Syros/Alternatives. 1996. ISBN 2-89031-124-4.
- Claude Léveillée, by Marie-Josée Michaud, Montreal, Art Global
  - Volume 1, 2004, 380 p.ISBN 2-9207-1890-8, 978-2-9207-1890-6 — from his birth to his return from Paris in 1960
  - Volume 2, 2008, 480 p.ISBN 978-2920-71895-1 — from 1960 to 27 April 2004

Marriages: Micheline Guernon (mother of her son Pascal); Monica Miller; Francine Massé; Hélène LeTendre LeBlond 1986–2011.

== See also ==
- Quebec music
