= Les Yeux de la faim =

Single by Fondation Quebec-Afrique
- Released: May 1985
- Recorded: 1985
- Genre: Pop
- Length: 4:25
- Label: Kébec-Disc
- Songwriters: Gil Courtemanche; Jean Robitaille
- Producer: Jean Robitaille

"Les Yeux de la faim" (meaning "The Eyes of Hunger") is a French-language song written by Canadian journalist Gil Courtemanche and Canadian composer Jean Robitaille. It was recorded by a one-off supergroup of many musicians to raise funds for the Quebec-Africa Foundation, a charity to help people facing famine in Africa. It was released as a charity single in May 1985 in Quebec. "Les Yeux de la faim" was one of a number of such supergroup singles released around this time, along with "Do They Know It's Christmas?" in the United Kingdom, "We Are the World" in the United States and "Tears Are Not Enough" in English Canada.

== Participating artists ==
Artists participating in the recording included: Celine Dion, Daniel Lavoie, Martine St-Clair, Michel Rivard, Jean-Pierre Ferland, Gilles Vigneault, Nicole Martin, Claude Léveillée, Donald Lautrec, Claude Gauthier, Véronique Béliveau, Pierre Bertrand, Marie-Michèle Desrosiers, Yvon Deschamps, Renée Claude, Pierre Lalonde, Louise Portal, Dominique Michel, Jacques Michel, Louise Forestier, Sylvain Lelièvre, Marjo, Jean-Guy Moreau, Belgazou, Martine Chevrier, Michel Louvain, François Cousineau, Diane Juster, Jacques Boulanger, Michel Lemieux, Peter Pringle, Sylvie Tremblay, Nanette Workman, Robert Leroux, Patsy Gallant, René Simard, Nathalie Simard, Normand Brathwaite and the band Toulouse.

== Commercial performance ==
"Les Yeux de la faim" entered the chart in Quebec on 25 May 1985. The song topped it for seven weeks between June and August 1985, and stayed on the chart for nineteen weeks. "Les Yeux de la faim" was certified gold in Canada on 28 August 1985.

== Awards ==
In 1986, PROCAN presented special awards to the song's writers, Gil Courtemanche and Jean Robitaille, and to the Quebec-Africa Foundation to honour their charitable commitment. Courtemanche and Robitaille were also nominated for the Félix Award for Author/Composer of the Year but lost to Corey Hart.

== Track listings and formats ==
- Canadian 7" single
1. "Les Yeux de la faim" – 4:25
2. "Les Yeux de la faim" (Instrumental Version) – 4:25
- Canadian 12" maxi-single
1. "Les Yeux de la faim" (Extended) – 5:38
2. "Les Yeux de la faim" (Extended Instrumental Version) – 5:38

== Charts ==
Chart (1985)	Peak position
Quebec (ADISQ)	1

== Certifications and sales ==
Region	Certification	Certified units/sales
Canada (Music Canada)	Gold	50,000^{^}
^{^} Shipments figures based on certification alone.
