= Peter Pringle =

Canadian musician (born 1945)

- Born: September 7, 1945 (age 81); Halifax, Nova Scotia, Canada
- Genres: pop, jazz, classical
- Instruments: vocals, piano, theremin, various string instruments
- Years active: 1975–present

Peter Pringle (born September 7, 1945) is a Canadian musician and television personality, most prominent in the 1970s and 1980s.

== Early career ==
Pringle began performing at age six in the children's choir of the Canadian Opera Company. He later studied a variety of classical instruments, including lute, sitar and surbahar, financing his studies by writing pop songs. Several of his songs were recorded by Anne Murray, for whom he also performed as a backing vocalist.

There have been occasional erroneous claims made in internet forums that Pringle's real name is David Murray, and that he is Anne Murray's brother. While Anne Murray did have a brother named David, he was a surgeon rather than a musician, and he died in 2021.

== Recording ==
Pringle moved to Los Angeles in 1975, and released his self-titled debut album the following year. He then moved to Montreal in 1980, and continued to record pop songs in both English and French. He is a two-time Juno Award nominee for Most Promising Male Vocalist, at the Juno Awards of 1978 and the Juno Awards of 1982.

In 1985, he participated in the recording of "Les Yeux de la faim", a French-language charity single for the 1983–85 famine in Ethiopia, alongside musicians such as René Simard, Nathalie Simard, André Gagnon, Yvon Deschamps, Gilles Vigneault, Nanette Workman and Patsy Gallant, and in 1986 he was one of the performers at Canada's first major benefit concert for HIV/AIDS, alongside Michel Louvain, Joe Bocan, Denny Christianson and Les Grands Ballets Canadiens.

In 1986, he garnered a Genie Award nomination for Best Original Song for "Cold As Ice", a song he co wrote with Kevin Hunter, for the soundtrack to the film Toby McTeague; a minor controversy resulted when the song was mistakenly omitted from the first round of ballots sent out to Academy of Canadian Cinema and Television voters, forcing the Academy to send out replacement ballots.

In this era, he was also a regular host of the Miss Teen Canada pageant, and hosted television variety specials for TVA.

Since 2007 he has gained recognition online for performing ancient epics and poems on his Youtube channel. He uses a wide variety of instruments from the lyre to the hurdy-gurdy and performs many of these poems in their original ancient languages. His recording of the initial verses of the Epic of Gilgamesh, specifically Gilgamesh, Enkidu, and the Netherworld, has more than 13 million views as of March 2026.

== Acting ==
In 1987, Pringle premiered a one-man theatrical show in which he portrayed Noël Coward, mixing a dramatic monologue with performances of Coward's songs. He toured the show across Canada several times over the next few years, as well as creating and performing several other musical revue shows, including From Irving Berlin to Gilles Vigneault, a show based on the biblical Song of Songs and New York-Paris, a Musical Voyage. In 1994 he also appeared as Duncan in a production of Wendy Wasserstein's play The Sisters Rosensweig.

== Theremin ==
Pringle released a compilation album, Comme j'étais - comme je suis!, in 1996, and then retired from recording or performing pop music.

By 1998, Pringle began to reemerge as a theremin player. He has released two independent albums of theremin music, has performed on the instrument both in solo shows and with the Montreal Chamber Orchestra, and has released a number of YouTube videos of his performances of both classical and modern pieces on the instrument.

== Discography ==
- Peter Pringle (1976)
- Rain Upon The Sea (1981)
- Magicien (1981)
- Fifth Avenue Blue (1982)
- Pour Une Femme (1982)
- Souris-Moi (1984)
- Fantasies (1984)
- Chansons d'amour (1984)
- Pauvre Casanova (1985)
- Noel Coward: A Portrait (1987)
- Le Jeu d'amour (1991)
- Le Secret du Cantique des Cantiques (1992)
- Comme j'étais - comme je suis! (1996)
- Many Voices (2003)
- A Theremin Jewel Box
- Dancing Alone (2021)
