= Sous le signe du lion =

- Genre: drama series
- Created by: Françoise Loranger
- Country of origin: Canada
- No. of seasons: 3
- No. of episodes: 56

Production
- Running time: 30 min. and 60 min.

Original release
- Network: Télévision de Radio-Canada

Sous le signe du lion is a Quebec television series comprising thirty 30-minute episodes, directed by Jean-Pierre Sénécal and broadcast in 1961. A two-season remake (thirteen 60-minute episodes each season) was broadcast in 1997 and in 2000. The original screenplay was written by Françoise Loranger. Hélène Pedneault adapted it in 1997 and Guy Fournier in 2000. The 1997 adaptation was directed by Maude Martin, and the 2000 by Yvon Trudel.

Faced with the daring and modern script, Radio-Canada refused to broadcast it at first, but changed its mind a few years later.

== Synopsis ==
The story revolves around rich and powerful Jérémie Martin, the father in a family which fears and scorns him. It begins after the death of his wife Clothilde, who is euthanized by Jérémie's mistress and the family maid, Annette. The plot unfolds around Clothilde's locket, on which is engraved "Qui suis-je?" (Who am I?), and her diary, to which Jérémie has no access.

In the second season of the remake, Jérémie is paralyzed after a heart attack. He loses his hold on the family, which further worsens his health.

== Cast ==
=== Original version ===
- Juliette Béliveau: Marie-Rose Julien
- Rita Bibeau: shop employee
- Charlotte Boisjoli: Annette Julien
- Monique Champagne: Céline Martin
- Colette Courtois: stenographer
- Jean Coutu: Beaujeu Martin
- Jean Dalmain: Dr. Rondeau
- Bertrand Gagnon: Master Pelletier
- Roger Garceau: Notary Public Beauchemin
- François Guillier: Michel Martin
- Paul Hébert: Gabriel Mercier
- Jacques Kasma: René
- Madeleine Langlois: Céline Martin
- François Lavigne: Trudeau
- Ovila Légaré: Jérémie Martin
- Yves Létourneau: Laurent Martin
- Michel Mailhot: Jean-Marie Mounier
- Monique Mercure: Simone
- Jean-Louis Millette: a client of Beaujeu's
- Dyne Mousso: Martine Julien
- Jean-Louis Paris: Albert Julien
- Claude Préfontaine: Philippe Beaujeu
- Denise Provost: Clothilde Martin
- Rose Rey-Duzil: Maria
- Claire Richard: Carmelle
- François Tassé (actor): Maurice
- Véronique Vilbert: Beaujeu's secretary

=== Remake ===
- Jean Besré: Notary Public Beauchemin
- Eric Cabana: Maurice
- Anne-Marie Cadieux: Simone
- Margot Campbell: Céline
- Corinne Chevarier: Carmelle
- Suzanne Clément: Martine Julien
- Jean Deschênes: Jérémie's father
- Pierre Drolet: doctor
- Jacques Godin: Jérémie Martin
- James P. Hyndman: Jean-Marie Mounier
- Pierre Légaré: Pelletier
- Sylvie Legault: Céline Martin
- Roger Léger: Laurent Martin
- Jacques Lussier: Beaujeu Martin
- Alexis Martin: Philippe Beaujeu
- Marie-Claude Michaud: Geneviève
- Nathalie Naubert: Clothilde Beaujeu
- Huguette Oligny: Marie-Rose Julien
- Denys Paris: René
- Claude Préfontaine: Dr. Rondeau
- Claude Prégent: Albert Julien
- Danielle Proulx: Annette Julien
- Denis Roy: Gabriel Mercier
- Gabriel Sabourin: Michel Martin
- Lenie Scoffié: Maria
- Gisèle Trépanier: Antonia

== Awards ==
- Prix Gémeaux for best series in 1998

== See also ==
- List of French-language Canadian television series
