= Zizanie =

(La) Zizanie may refer to:

- La Zizanie, a 2001 album recorded by French pop singer Zazie
- La Zizanie (film), a 1978 French comedy film directed by Claude Zidi
- La Zizanie, the French name of the comic book Asterix and the Roman Agent
- Zizanie, a 2019 dance work performed by Restless Dance Theatre in Adelaide, Australia
- Zizanie (game show), a French Canadian game show hosted by Jacques Lussier in 1990–92

== See also ==
- JG Thirlwell, who also works under the project name of Baby Zizanie
