= André Langevin =

Canadian writer and journalist

André Langevin, OC (July 11, 1927 – February 21, 2009) was a Canadian writer and journalist. He is best known for his Prix du Cercle du livre de France-winning novels Évadé de la nuit (1951) and Poussière sur la ville (1953); Poussière sur la ville was also published in English as Dust Over the City (1955), and adapted by Arthur Lamothe as the theatrical film Dust from Underground in 1968.

== Biography ==
Langevin was born in Montreal, but lost both parents in childhood and spent seven years living in an orphanage. He was educated at the Collège de Montréal, and joined Le Devoir as a journalist in 1945. He also wrote for Le Temps, La Liberté, Le Nouveau Journal and Le Magazin Maclean, and won the Prix Liberté for his journalism in 1967. He was also a news editor for Radio Canada until 1985.

His other novels included Le Temps des hommes (1956), followed by a long period of silence, broken by L'Élan d'Amérique (1972) and Une Chaîne dans le parc (1974). Une Chaîne dans le parc, later translated into English as Orphan Street, was the first Canadian novel ever to be nominated for the Prix Goncourt. He also wrote short stories and dramatic plays for both stage and radio, including Une Nuit d'amour (1954) and L'Oeil du peuple (1957).

He wrote or, at least, published nothing after 1974.

He was awarded the Prix Athanase-David in 1998 for his body of work. A new edition of his works was published in 2013 by Éditions du Boréal.
