= Gens du pays =

Québécois song

"Gens du pays" is a Québécois song that is often considered the unofficial national anthem of Quebec. Written by poet and singer-songwriter Gilles Vigneault, and with music co-written by Gaston Rochon, it was first performed by Vigneault on June 24, 1975 during a concert on Montreal's Mount Royal at that year's Fête nationale du Québec ceremony. It quickly became a folk classic, and it has been played frequently at Fête nationale ceremonies since then. The chorus is by far the most famous part of the song: Gens du pays, c'est votre tour / De vous laisser parler d'amour, which, translated, says, "people of the land, it is your turn to let yourselves speak of love."

The song is also associated with the Quebec sovereignty movement and the sovereigntist Parti Québécois, which use it as a sort of anthem. A famous instance of this took place at René Lévesque's concession speech after the citizens of the province rejected independence in the 1980 Quebec referendum. At the end of Lévesque's speech, the crowd assembled to hear him speak stood up and sang "Gens du pays", which Lévesque called "the most beautiful Québécois song in the minds of all Quebecers."

== Birthday adaptation ==
In Quebec, a modified version of the chorus is often sung to celebrate a person, for example on a birthday (in the specific case of the birthday, the idea was explicitly introduced by Vigneault, Yvon Deschamps and Louise Forestier at the song's 1975 introduction):

Mon cher ami (or Ma chère amie), c'est à ton tour
De te laisser parler d'amour.

("My dear friend, it's your turn / To let yourself be lovingly spoken to.")

Alternatively, "ami(e)" (friend) is replaced with the name of the person being celebrated.

For instance, at René Lévesque's funeral, mourners outside the church broke out singing "Mon cher René, c'est à ton tour de te laisser parler d'amour."

The birthday adaptation uses the familiar, informal and singular "tu" form of French personal pronouns, in contrast with the original which uses "vous" pronouns, which are either singular but formal, or plural (as with other Romance languages such as Spanish).

== See also ==
- List of birthday songs
