= Paul Buissonneau =

French-Canadian theatre director

Paul Georges Buissonneau, OC (born 24 December 1926 – 30 November 2014) was a francophone theatre director in Montreal, Quebec, Canada.

Born in Paris, Buissonneau started his career as a singer with the French chorus Les Compagnons de la chanson, alongside Édith Piaf who was also singing with the group at the time. He parted company with the chorus during a tour of North America, and settled in Quebec.

In 1952, the City of Montreal appointed Buissonneau as artistic director of La Roulotte, a parks-based outdoor theatre, which gave an early opportunity to famous Quebec artists Yvon Deschamps, Jean-Louis Millette, Claude Jasmin, Claude Léveillée, Marcel Sabourin and Robert Charlebois.

In 1956, he founded his own company, the Théâtre de Quat'Sous (Four-penny Theatre) and served as its artistic director until 1989. Many famous Quebec playwrights began their career in this theatre, notably Robert Lepage, François Barbeau, André Brassard, René-Daniel Dubois, and Lothaire Bluteau.

During his 35-year career as director of the Quat'Sous theatre, he played and wrote numerous plays and TV shows. He is remembered for creating and bringing to life the character of Picolo in the children's television series entitled La Boîte à surprises (The surprise box). The series started in 1954 and lasted until the early 1970s.

He received the Governor General's Performing Arts Award in 1998 and the Prix Denise-Pelletier in 2001. In 2009, he was made an Officer of the Order of Canada "for his contributions to the evolution of the performing arts, especially theatre, as director of the La Roulotte and Quat’Sous theatres."

== See also ==
- Culture of Quebec
