= Dust from Underground =

1968 Canadian film

- French: Poussière sur la ville
- Directed by: Arthur Lamothe
- Written by: André Langevin
- Based on: Poussière sur la ville by André Langevin
- Produced by: Pierre Patry; Jean Roy
- Starring: Michelle Rossignol; Guy Sanche
- Cinematography: Guy-Laval Fortier; Michel Brault; Jean Roy; Réo Grégoire; Michel Régnier; Jacques Filion
- Edited by: Arthur Lamothe
- Music by: Gilles Vigneault
- Production company: Coopératio
- Release date: May 3, 1968
- Running time: 93 minutes
- Country: Canada
- Language: French

Dust from Underground (French: Poussière sur la ville) is a Canadian drama film, directed by Arthur Lamothe and released in 1968. Adapted from the novel by André Langevin, the film stars Michelle Rossignol as Madeleine Dubois, a woman who begins to have an extramarital affair when her husband Alain (Guy Sanche) is too busy at work to devote any time and attention to their relationship.

The cast also included Henri Norbert, Nicole Filion, Gilles Pelletier, Nicolas Doclin, Roland Chenail, Victor Désy, Paul Guèvremont, Pierre Dupuis, Rose-Rey Duzil, Réjeanne Desrameaux and Louisette Dussault.

The film was shot in Thetford Mines, Quebec, in 1965, but was not released theatrically until 1968. In addition to screening commercially in Quebec, the film was screened at the 18th Berlin Film Festival in 1968 as part of Young Canadian Film, a lineup of films by emerging Canadian filmmakers.
