= 1 fois 5 =

Studio album by multiple artists
- Released: 1991 (original release in 1976)
- Genre: Québécois
- Length: 78:11 min.
- Label: GSI Musique (GSIC-2117)
- Producers: Guy Latraverse and André Perry for Kébec-Disque

The album 1 fois 5, released in 1976, includes the greatest hits of the artists Robert Charlebois, Gilles Vigneault, Claude Léveillée, Yvon Deschamps and Jean-Pierre Ferland, interpreted on Mount Royal on Saint-Jean-Baptiste Day.

The following year, the album won the prize of the Académie Charles Cros.

== The Show ==
- Two years after the Superfrancofête concert J'ai vu le loup, le renard, le lion, the organisers of the celebrations for the National Holiday in 1976 (the 23 June) decided to create another giant outdoor concert. This time, the political content and the sense of identity needed to be stronger, and five singers were chosen instead of three. The members of the concert of 1974 were rapidly thrown together, each artist providing their own musicians. In 1976, an orchestra were provided, with much time for practice, collaborations, and even a collaborative composition session, which led to Chacun dit je t'aime. The concert took place twice, in Québec on the Plaines d'Abraham, on 21 June 1976 and in Montréal on Mount Royal, on 23 June 1976. Robert Charlebois and Gilles Vigneault were again part of the event, with the addition of Claude Léveillée, Jean-Pierre Ferland and Yvon Deschamps, the last a surprising inclusion, since he is known foremost as a comedian, and then a singer. The patriotism in songs like Gens du pays (sung by all five) is mostly in the songs by Vigneault, but also Charlebois' The frog song. The rocker had already performed his songs successfully two years previously, therefore he had to perform songs from his new record, Longue distance. A new version of Fu Man Chu was also performed. Charlebois also sung a duet with Léveillée on Les vieux pianos with two pianos on stage. All five contributed parts of their traditional-influenced songs in the La même gigue medley. The sound is better than on the previous album, and 1 Fois 5 is a good example of singer-songwriters from the 1970s in Québec and of the nationalism of the time.
- The last replaying of the concert was done at Radio-Québec, on Saint-Jean-Baptiste in 1997.
- At Saint-Jean-Baptiste on 23 June 2006, France D'Amour, Anik Jean, Marjo, Andrée Watters and Marie-Hélène Fortin of the group Mes Aïeux revisited the classic songs of the five singers in a special performance marking the 30th anniversary of the 1 fois 5 concert.
- Eventually, GSI Musique worked for several months on the version of the "Une fois 5" concert recording, releasing a record and video of the concert together with Radio-Québec who owned the rights to the visual aspects of the concert. The release date has been set to June 1, 2010, for the CD/DVD of this legendary concert.

== Songs on record ==
--Disc 1--

1. Gens du pays / les 5
2. The frog song / Robert Charlebois
3. Il me reste un pays / Gilles Vigneault
4. L'étoile d'Amérique / Claude Léveillée
5. Aimons-nous / Yvon Deschamps
6. Le petit roi / Jean-Pierre Ferland
7. Tout l'monde est malheureux / Gilles Vigneault
8. Les fesses / Yvon Deschamps
9. Les vieux pianos / Robert Charlebois et Claude Léveillée
10. Mon ami J.C. / Jean-Pierre Ferland
11. La grande valse fofolle / Claude Léveillée
12. Le doux chagrin / Les 5
13. a) Vive les Jeux olympiques; b) J'sais pas comment, j'sais pas pourquoi / Yvon Deschamps
14. Chacun dit je t'aime / les 5
15. Ce matin un homme / Claude Léveillée
16. Mon ami Fidel / Robert Charlebois
17. Les gens de mon pays / Gilles Vigneault
18. Un peu plus haut, un peu plus loin / Jean-Pierre Ferland
19. La même gigue / les 5
20. Gens du pays / les 5

== Songs of the concert ==
1. Gens du pays / les 5
2. Marie-Claire / Jean-Pierre Ferland
3. The frog song / Robert Charlebois
4. Il me reste un pays / Gilles Vigneault
5. L'étoile d'Amérique / Claude Léveillée
6. Aimons-nous / Yvon Deschamps
7. C'est extraordinaire (dialogue) / Les 5
8. Tout l'monde est malheureux / Gilles Vigneault
9. La grande valse fofolle / Claude Léveillée
10. Les fesses / Yvon Deschamps
11. Les vieux pianos / Robert Charlebois et Claude Léveillée
12. Le doux chagrin / Les 5
13. Mon ami Fidel / Robert Charlebois
14. Mon ami J.C. / Jean-Pierre Ferland
15. Fu Man Chu (Chu D'dans) / Robert Charlebois
16. Vive les jeux olympiques (monologue)/ Yvon Deschamps
17. J'sais pas comment, j'sais pas pourquoi / Yvon Deschamps
18. Le petit roi / Jean-Pierre Ferland
19. Ce matin un homme / Claude Léveillée
20. Les gens de mon pays / Gilles Vigneault
21. Un peu plus haut, un peu plus loin / Jean-Pierre Ferland
22. Présentation des musiciens / Les 5
23. Chacun dit je t'aime / Les 5
24. La même gigue / les 5
25. Gens du pays / les 5

== Production team ==
- Musicians – Victor Angellilo, Marcel Beauchamp, Gaston Rochon, Gilles Schetagne, Marc Bélanger, Jean-Marie Benoît, Michel Dion, Ronald Faucher, Michel Fauteux, Jean-Claude Guérard, Jean-Pierre Lauzon, Daniel Lessard, Michel Le François, Yvan Ouellet, Richard Provençal, Libert Subirana, Serge Vallières
- Choir: France Castel, Louise Lemire, Louise Bédard and Margo McKinnon
- Musical directors: Gaston Rochon, Marcel Beauchamp, Michel Le François, Jean-Pierre Lauzon and Yvan Ouellet
- Director: The group; Artistic counselor: Jean Bissonnette
- Sound: Michel Léveillée, Nick Blagona assisted by André Perry
- Mixing: Nick Blagona assisted by André Perry
- Studio: Fedco Audio Labs (Mobile studio), Le Studio Morin-Heighs
- Original recording: Sabin Brunet, S.N.B. in 1976
- Digital remastering: Bill Kipper, S.N.B. in 1991
- Production: GSI Musique and Kébec Disque; executive producers: Jean Bissonnette, Jean-Claude L'Espérance, Guy Latraverse
- Liner notes- Conception and graphic design: Kébec Disque; Presentation text: Lise Payette
