= Mon Pays =

1964 song by Gilles Vigneault

"Mon pays" ("My Country", or "My Homeland", in English) is a song composed by Quebec singer-songwriter Gilles Vigneault in 1964.

The song was written for the NFB film The Snow Has Melted on the Manicouagan (La Neige a fondu sur la Manicouagan), directed by Arthur Lamothe. The song consists of six stanzas of lyrics about winds, cold, snow, and ice, of the solitude of wide open spaces and of the ideal of brotherhood. Its theme, "'Mon pays ce n'est pas un pays, c'est l'hiver", is well-known throughout the province. As well as expressing the natural beauty and praising the special characteristics of the composer's Quebec homeland, the song is seen by many people as declaring the free spirit of the province; Vigneault has denied that this was ever his intention; however, he has been firm that "mon pays" refers to Quebec and should not be associated with Canada as a whole.

Vigneault won the Prix Félix-Leclerc at the 1965 Festival du disque de Montréal for the song. Later that same year, Monique Leyrac performed it at the International Song Festival in Sopot, Poland, taking first prize with it.

In 1977, the melody from "Mon Pays" was reworked into the disco song "From New York to L.A." recorded by Patsy Gallant. This song with English lyrics by Gene Williams unrelated to the original French, was an international hit for Gallant - Canada/ #6 Pop, #1 Adult Contemporary,/ the UK/ #6, Ireland/ #5, Australia/ #10, the Netherlands/ #15, Norway/ #7, South Africa/ #5, Sweden/ #17, - and in 1995 reached #5 in Austria via a remake credited to N.Y.L.A. featuring Stephanie McKay.
