= Picolo =

Character on Canadian children's TV

Picolo is the name of a character created by Paul Buissonneau for the Canadian Broadcasting Corporation (CBC). Picolo is also the title track of several program series with Paul Buissonneau in the title role aired on television channel CBC. For several years, even in official sources, the spelling Picolo or Piccolo is used. (Note: As part of the show The Children of TV aired December 12, 2012 and relating to youth programming, an extract from the very first episode 1956 was released and the title was written 'Piccolo' with two "c". 'Picolo' is spelled with two "c" in the 'This is Radio-Canada - schedule TV and radio' 1967 It is only under the name 'Picolo' (with a "c ") that Paul Buissonneau registered the trademark with the Canadian Intellectual property Office. Books, music and games that we could see were all in the name of 'Picolo'. Finally, the credits of the show aired from 1968 to 1971 indicated 'Picolo'.)

== Original Character ==
In the summer of 1956, (Note: According to the local listing 'Week at CBC', the series aired from June 25 to September 17, 1956.) Fernand Golden Buissonneau asked Paul Buissonneau to write the texts of the Picolo series and personify the title role. In the 13-part series, Picolo spoke with characters from fairy tales (Bluebeard, Little Red Riding Hood, Puss in Boots, the Cadet Rousselle, Tom Thumb, Mother Michel, etc.). This series also introduced Claude Préfontaine and Gilles Gauthier.

The costume was made from a drawing by Francoise Charbonneau. (Note: According to the book of Jean-Marie and Olivier Bioteau Lasser: Paul Buissonneau ou la vigoureuse impatience (Paul Buissonneau or vigorous impatience), published by Lanctôt Editor in 1997, Francoise Charbonneau became the first wife of Paul Buissonneau November 18, 1949 (page 122). Francoise Charbonneau is better known in the art world as the Françoise Nicot (page 227). A report by Hughette Proulx on page 18 of the newspaper 'Radiomonde and Télémonde' 4 January 1958 'shows a photograph showing the photographer Orssagh Paul Buissonneau in the costume of Picolo and Françoise Nicot in a suit similar (Source: Archives of Michel_Pebbles and the National Library of Quebec). The name of his character is Picolette (source: interview with Paul Buissonneau). Paul Buissonneau indicates that this was a special show at a party. The article itself says that the show was called 'The Mailbox Pictures' and that it was a show that took place on Christmas Eve. Involved in this issue, also, Madeleine_Arbour, Pierre Thériault in 'Mr. Surprise', Kim_Yaroshevskaya in Fanfreluche 'etc. Comparing text and photographs, it can be said that this is the episode of the Wednesday, December 25, 1957, at 17:00 of La Boîte à Surprise (The Surprise Box).)

Thereafter, from the 1956–1957 season, Picolo also became a character in La Boîte à Surprise (The Surprise Box). He addressed the themes of the Commedia dell'arte with Pulcinella, Harlequin, etc. (Note: Some information about La Boîte à Surprise were obtained during an interview with Paul Buissonneau by Pensees2008 on May 17, 2009.)

Also as part of La Boîte à Surprise, another series of 33 episodes that focuses on the areas of France was made.

Paul Buissonneau created a third series, as part of the Surprise Box with Picolo "Picolo and objects". This is a 15-minute program. It was rebroadcast on Wednesday morning 17 and 24 May 1967.

Description from "Here CBC: local listings for television" "Clown strange, half-Pierrot, Harlequin half, Piccolo can talk to objects around and make them talk with Paul Buissonneau. "

Hold the DVD box set! It is Picolo Volume 1, distributed by Imavision in 2007, includes excerpts of songs from "Picolo and objects."

Meanwhile, Paul Buissonneau interpreted his character Picolo at The Treehouse city of Montreal.

As of October 18, 1967, as part of The Box Surprise, we were treated to a series of episodes of a half-hour "Picolo" which could also be presented as the "Picolo and Michel" when Michael the Magician was present. Paul Buissonneau was in the role of Picolo, Michel Pebbles in the role of Michael the Magician, Pants, the Doctor and Captain Columbine.

From 1968 to 1971, Picolo became a series of thirty-minute episodes covering the main themes of the Commedia dell'arte, with Pants, the Doctor, and Captain Columbine. Michael the magician was also be part of the distribution. Episodes of the 1967-1968 period of the Surprise Box were integrated into the Picolo series.

During the same period, a Picolo musical was produced which had musical interludes featuring Picolo. Thereafter, the musical interludes were released individually at different times, between two programs for several years.

All forms of advertising were removed from TV shows for children. This was necessary to fill the gaps left by the missing ads. There was, on disc, entire directories snippets of famous classical music, stripped of all rights. Paul Buissonneau gave free rein to his imagination to sustain his character Piccolo with small adventures accompanied by the music. These interludes have therefore been included in the regular youth programming on the air instead of advertisements. These interludes were actually gathered during three specials. These interludes were shot on film, and unfortunately, they were lost.

In 1980, creation of the Piccolo Theatre (Piccolo's name is spelled with two "C") in the Threepenny Theatre. This time, however, it was Bernard who personified Meney Piccolo. The production was broadcast on Télé-Métropole December 25, 1981.

In November 2010, the City of Montreal inaugurated a mural in honor of Paul Buissonneau at the corner of Ontario Street and Beaudry. The mural of the character Picolo of The Box Surprise was designed by artist Lawrence Gascon. It measures 227 square feet (about 21 square meters) and is composed of a mosaic of brightly colored ceramics.
