= Claude Préfontaine =

Canadian actor

- Born: Claude Préfontaine; January 24, 1933; Montreal, Quebec, Canada
- Died: January 5, 2013 (aged 79); Montreal, Quebec, Canada
- Occupation: Actor
- Years active: 1960–2009

Claude Préfontaine (January 24, 1933 – January 5, 2013) was a Canadian actor who also appeared in many films and Canadian versions of cartoons. He died, aged 79, in Montreal, Quebec, Canada.

== Filmography ==
=== Movie ===
- 1966 : YUL 871
- 1968 : Valérie
- 1970 : Le savoir-faire s'impose
- 1972 : The True Nature of Bernadette
- 1974 : Les aventures d'une jeune veuve
- 1982 : Au boulot Galarneau! (short film)
- 1983 : The Deadly Game of Nations
- 1984 : Adolescente, sucre d'amour
- 1988 : Some Girls
- 1989 : Laura Laur
- 1991 : Les naufragés du Labrador
- 1992 : Communion (short film)
- 1995 : La présence des ombres
- 2001 : Les oubliés du XXIe siècle ou la fin du travail
- 2002 : Savage Messiah

=== Television ===
- Picolo (CBC, 1956)
- Sous le signe du lion (SRC, 1961) — Philippe
- Les Enquêtes Jobidon (SRC, 1962–1964)
- Ti-Jean caribou (SRC, 1963–1966)
- Nos étés (TVA, 2006) — Docteur Pouliot, 1 episode
- Les Sœurs Elliot (TVA, 2007) — Théo Ortéga (contained)

=== Theater ===
- Richard II de Shakespeare
- Dom Juan de Molière
- Au retour des oies blanches (1966)
