= Françoise Loranger =

Canadian playwright, radio producer, theatrical writer and feminist

- Born: June 18, 1913; Saint-Hilaire
- Died: April 5, 1995 (aged 81); Montreal
- Spouse(s): Paul Simard(1), Jean Michaud(2)
- Parent(s): Joseph-Henri Loranger, Marguerite Lareau

Françoise Loranger (June 18, 1913 – April 5, 1995) was a Canadian playwright, radio producer, theatrical writer and feminist. She was born in Saint-Hilaire.

== Biography ==
Loranger left school at the age of 15, there being no public education provision in Québec for girls at the time. At the age of 17 she was writing short fiction for the magazine Revue Populaire. She started writing radio scripts in 1938, often collaborating with the poet, novelist and playwright Robert Choquette. In 1949 she published her first novel, Mathieu, which was a success with critics and the public. In the 1950s and 1960s she wrote many TV dramas, notably the series Sous le signe du lion (1961–62). In 1965 she turned her attention to the theatre with the play Une maison … un jour, which toured France and Russia. She won the 1967 Governor General's Awards with Encore cinq minutes in the French "poetry or drama" section.

Loranger died in Montreal.

== Selected works ==
- Mathieu (1949)

=== Theatre ===
- Une maison … un jour (1963)
- Encore cinq minutes (1966)
- Double jeu (1967)
- Le chemin du roy en collaboration avec Claude Levac (1967-1978)
- Médium saignant (1969)
- Jour après jour (1971)
- Un si bel automne (1971)
- La dame de cent ans (1995)

=== TV ===
- Georges … oh! Georges ou Jour après Jour (1958)
- Un cri qui vient de loin (1965)
- La dame de cent ans (1978)
- Sous le signe du lion (1993)
