= Arlette Cousture =

Canadian writer

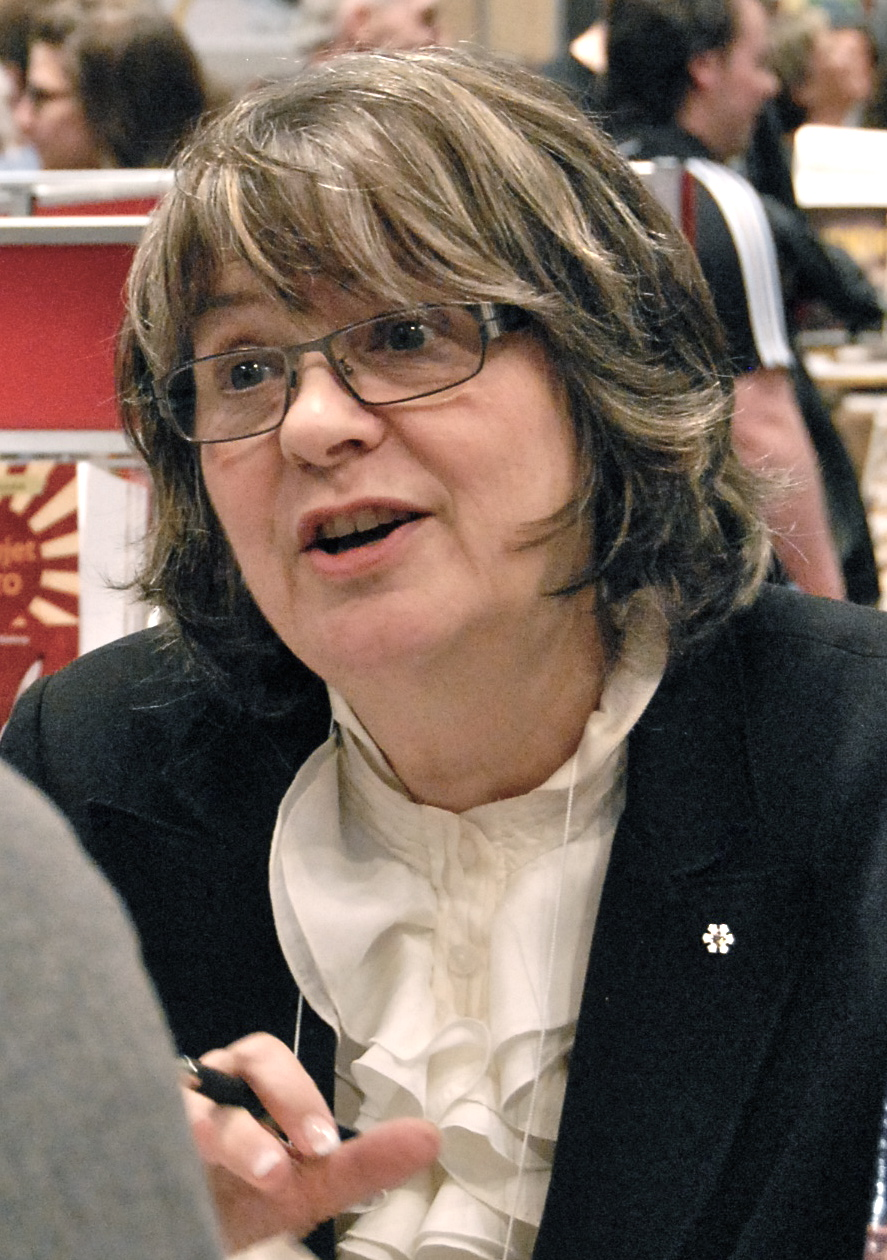
- Cousture
- Born: April 3, 1948 (age 78); Saint-Lambert, Quebec, Canada
- Writing career
- Genre: Novel
- Notable work: Les Filles de Caleb

Arlette Cousture, OC CQ (born April 3, 1948) is a Canadian writer. She writes historical fiction, often depicting the lives of women in Quebec. Many of her novels have become best-sellers in the French language.

== Early life ==
Cousture was born in Saint-Lambert, Quebec, Canada. She graduated with a Bachelor of Arts from collège Sainte-Marie.

== Career ==
As a young woman, Cousture worked at Radio-Canada television. She later worked in radio and as a journalist. She worked in communications at Hydro Quebec.

In the 1980s, Cousture wrote a pair of best-selling novels, Les filles de Caleb, about the life of a young teacher in rural Quebec. The stories later became the basis of a television series and were translated into English. Cousture later wrote more stories about the novels' heroine, Emilie.

In the 1990s, Cousture wrote a two-volume story, Ces Enfants d'ailleurs, about a Polish family's move to Canada during World War II.

== Awards and honours ==
In 1998, she was made an Officer of the Order of Canada. In 2012, she was made a Knight of the National Order of Quebec.
