= Les Filles de Caleb =

Quebec TV series

- Created by: Jean Beaudin
- Written by: Arlette Cousture
- Directed by: Jean Beaudin
- Starring: Marina Orsini; Roy Dupuis; Germain Houde; Véronique Le Flaguais; Pierre Curzi
- Theme music composer: Richard Grégoire
- Country of origin: Canada
- Original language: French
- No. of episodes: 20

Production
- Editor: Pierre Thériault
- Running time: 1 hour

Original release
- Network: Radio-Canada
- Release: 1990 – 1991

Les Filles de Caleb is a Quebec TV series of 20 one-hour episodes, created by Jean Beaudin, based on the eponymous novel of Arlette Cousture, broadcast in 1990 on Radio-Canada and repeated in 2006 on Prise 2. An English-language version was also produced and broadcast in English Canada on CBC Television under the name Emilie. For its broadcast in France, the title of Émilie, la passion d'une vie was used.

== Plot ==
The series is set in the rural Mauricie region in the Province of Quebec at the end of the 19th century and through the beginning of the 20th century. Émilie, daughter of Caleb Bordeleau, decides to pursue her education. She faces great opposition from her small-minded entourage, but succeeds at becoming a school teacher. She falls in love with one of her students, the adventurer Ovila Pronovost, and is torn between her vocation and her love for him. The Bordeleau and Pronovost families worry about the alliance of these two lovers of such difficult to reconcile passions. After their marriage, they remain in the town of St-Tite and had many children. Ovila, restless and always attracted by wide open spaces, leaves the family to go up North to the Abitibi region, recently opened to colonisation, for opportunities to hunt and lumberjack. Émilie chooses to stay and bring up their family on her own. After the death of one of Ovila's brothers, they moved to Shawinigan.

== Cast ==
- Vincent Bolduc: Napoléon Bordeleau
- Marina Orsini: Émilie Bordeleau
- Roy Dupuis: Ovila Pronovost
- Germain Houde: Caleb Bordeleau
- Véronique Le Flaguais: Félicité Pronovost
- Pierre Curzi: Dosithée Pronovost
- Johanne-Marie Tremblay: Célina Bordeleau
- Jessica Barker: Charlotte Baumier
- Richard Blaimert: Edmond Pronovost
- Hugo Dubé: Joachim Crête
- Michel Goyette: Lazare Pronovost
- Patrick Goyette: Ovide Pronovost
- Lucie Laurier: Émilie, young
- Sophie Léger: Antoinette Arcand
- Jacques Lussier: Henri Douville
- Nathalie Mallette: Berthe Auclair
- Étienne de Passillé
- Karine Pelletier: Rose Pronovost
- Ysabelle Rosa: Rosée Pronovost
- Patrick Labbé: Télesphore Pronovost
- Annie Major-Matte: Marie-Ange Pronovost
