= Monique Leyrac =

Canadian actress and singer (1928–2019)

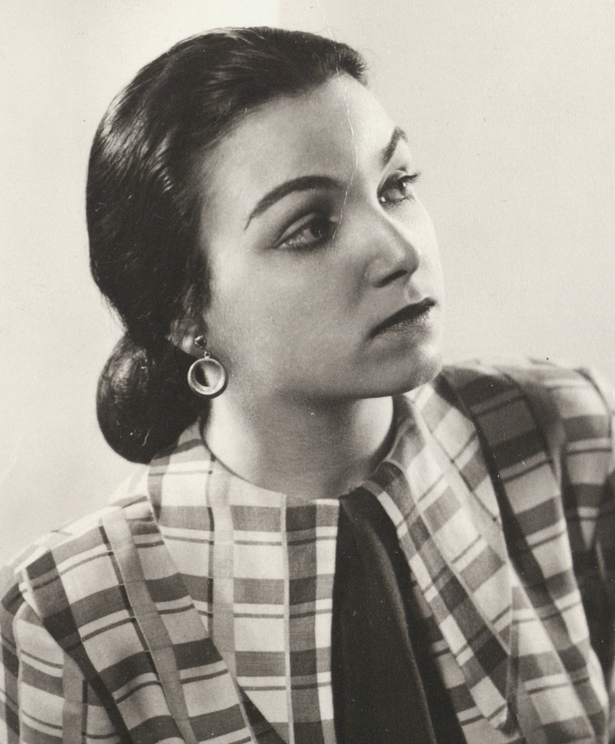
- Born: Monique Tremblay; 26 February 1928; Montreal, Quebec
- Died: 15 December 2019 (aged 91); Cowansville, Quebec
- Occupations: Singer, actress
- Known for: "Mon Pays"
- Awards: Order of Canada; National Order of Quebec; Governor General's Performing Arts Award

Monique Leyrac, OC, CQ (26 February 1928 – 15 December 2019) was a Canadian singer and actress who popularized many songs by French-Canadian composers.

== Early life ==
Leyrac was born Monique Tremblay in Montreal, Quebec. She helped raise her siblings while her mother worked as a milliner, while educating herself by reading poetry and fiction. She studied drama with Madame Maubourg.

== Career ==
Leyrac began her acting career on the radio in 1943, using her knowledge of music and drama. In 1965 she won the grand prize at the Sopot International Song Festival in Poland for her rendition of Gilles Vigneault's "Mon Pays". That year she also won first prize at the Festival de la Chanson at Ostende, Belgium. In 1967 she sang at Expo 67.

Leyrac was named an Officer of the Order of Canada in 1967 and was the subject of an hour-long documentary on CBC television in 1972. She received the 1979 Prix de musique Calixa-Lavallée. She recorded ten albums of music, and in the 1980s she began to write and stage one-woman shows in which she sang and acted.

In 1997, Leyrac received the Governor General's Performing Arts Award, Canada's highest honour in the performing arts. In 1998, she was made a Knight of the National Order of Quebec.

In 2007 a boxed set, Leyrac/La diva des années 60, was released, containing three albums of her performed songs, many by Quebec composers, as well as a DVD with a short documentary of her life and career. In 2013 Leyrac was presented with the Prix Denise-Pelletier for her outstanding career in the performing arts.

In 2019 a biography of Leyrac's life, written by François Dompierre, was released.

Leyrac was married for twenty-five years to actor-director Jean Dalmain, from 1952 to 1977. Leyrac died on 15 December 2019 in Cowansville, Quebec at the age of 91.
