= The Snow Has Melted on the Manicouagan =

1965 Canadian film

- French: La neige a fondu sur la Manicouagan
- Directed by: Arthur Lamothe
- Written by: Arthur Lamothe
- Produced by: Marcel Martin
- Starring: Monique Miller; Jean Doyon; Margot Campbell; Gilles Vigneault
- Cinematography: Gilles Gascon
- Edited by: Arthur Lamothe
- Music by: Gilles Vigneault
- Production company: National Film Board of Canada
- Release date: 1965
- Running time: 58 minutes
- Country: Canada
- Language: French

The Snow Has Melted on the Manicouagan (French: La neige a fondu sur la Manicouagan) is a Canadian dramatic docufiction film, directed by Arthur Lamothe and released in 1965. The film stars Monique Miller as a woman who is torn between the love of her husband (Jean Doyon) and her desire to escape the dreariness and tedium of their isolated life in rural northern Quebec where he works as a maintenance engineer on the Daniel-Johnson Dam.

The cast also includes Margot Campbell and singer-songwriter Gilles Vigneault in supporting roles. The film is historically most noted for "Mon Pays", Vigneault's most famous song and a classic of Quebec music, which was introduced as the film's theme song.

The film premiered at the 1965 Montreal International Film Festival.
