= Manouane River Lumberjacks =

- French: Bûcherons de la Manouane
- Directed by: Arthur Lamothe
- Written by: Arthur Lamothe
- Produced by: Fernand Dansereau; Victor Jobin
- Cinematography: Guy Borremans; Bernard Gosselin
- Edited by: Arthur Lamothe; Jean Dansereau
- Production company: National Film Board of Canada
- Release date: 1962
- Running time: 27 minutes
- Country: Canada
- Language: French

Manouane River Lumberjacks (French: Bûcherons de la Manouane) is a Canadian short documentary film, directed by Arthur Lamothe and released in 1962. Considered an important milestone in the Cinema of Quebec, the film is a portrait of lumberjacks working in the Manouane River area of Quebec, based in part on Lamothe's own history of having worked in the lumber camps before pursuing filmmaking.

The film has faced some discussion of the fact that some of its content was censored. Because the film contained some allegations of mistreatment and exploitation of the lumberworkers, the National Film Board prevented Lamothe from explicitly naming the lumber company they were working for, and from drawing any political conclusions about the fact that the lumber company was owned by English Canadians while the workers were all québécois or indigenous. Later analysis has also highlighted the fact that the lumberworkers' dialogue in the original French version of the film was not directly translated by either subtitling or dubbing in the English version, but was simply overdubbed with commentary by the film's narrator.

Despite this, the film is still seen as having a significant pro-worker political position, and as one of the first major Canadian documentary films to present a gritty direct cinema view of Quebec rather than a romanticized or folkloric image.
