= Thunder Drum =

- French: Mémoire battante
- Directed by: Arthur Lamothe
- Written by: Arthur Lamothe
- Produced by: Arthur Lamothe; Nicole Lamothe
- Starring: Gabriel Arcand
- Narrated by: Arthur Lamothe; Rolande Rock
- Cinematography: Guy Borremans; Jérôme Dal Santo; Daniel Fournier; Serge Giguère; Roger Moride
- Edited by: Nicole Lamothe
- Music by: Jean Sauvageau
- Production company: Les Ateliers Audio-Visuels du Québec
- Distributed by: Cinéma Libre
- Release date: October 1, 1983
- Running time: 168 minutes
- Country: Canada
- Language: French

Thunder Drum (French: Mémoire battante) is a Canadian documentary film, directed by Arthur Lamothe and released in 1983. The film is a portrait of the Innu people of northern Quebec.

The film was a Genie Award nominee for Best Feature Length Documentary at the 5th Genie Awards in 1984.
