= Trouble-Maker (film) =

- French: Trouble fête
- Directed by: Pierre Patry
- Written by: Pierre Patry; Jean-Claude Lord
- Produced by: Jean Roy; Pierre Patry; Roger Blais
- Starring: Lucien Hamelin; Louise Rémy; Jean Duceppe; Yves Létourneau; Gilbert Chénier
- Cinematography: Jean Roy
- Edited by: Lucien Marleau
- Music by: Claude Léveillée
- Production company: Coopératio
- Release date: 1964
- Country: Canada
- Language: French

Trouble-Maker (French: Trouble fête) is a Canadian drama film, directed by Pierre Patry and released in 1964.

The film stars Lucien Hamelin as Lucien, a student at a religious school who begins to rebel against the strict moral order of the Roman Catholic priests.

It was made over 25 days on a shoestring budget, and adapted some aspects of the direct cinema style of filmmaking. The film is typically analyzed by critics as an allegory for the Quiet Revolution, although its criticism of the Catholic church saw Patry threatened with excommunication.

The film was a Canadian Film Award finalist for Best Motion Picture in 1964.
