= Monique Miller (actress) =

French Canadian actress

Monique Miller OC, GOQ
- Born: 9 December 1933 (age 92); Montreal, Quebec
- Known for: actor

Monique Miller, OC GOQ (born 9 December 1933) is a French Canadian actress. She is known for her live theatre performances, and also performs in films and on television.

She is the sister of actress Louise Rémy.

== Career ==
In 1951 Miller performed in the first production of the Théâtre du Nouveau Monde in Montreal. She made her screen debut in the film Tit-Coq in 1953. In 1955 she performed in the television series Cap-aux-sorciers. In 1965 she appeared in the mid-length docufiction film The Snow Has Melted on the Manicouagan (La neige a fondu sur la Manicouagan).

In 2001, she was made an Officer of the Order of Canada. In 2011, she was made a Grand Officer of the National Order of Quebec.

Miller performed in the play Absence at the Dublin Dance Festival in 2015. In 2016 she won the National Theatre School of Canada's Gascon Thomas award.

As of 2018 Miller continues to perform in Montreal.
