= Arthur Lamothe =

- Born: December 7, 1928; Saint-Mont, France
- Died: September 18, 2013 (aged 84)
- Occupations: Film director Film producer Screenwriter
- Years active: 1961 - 2013

Arthur Lamothe, CM (December 7, 1928 – September 18, 2013) was a French-Canadian film director and film producer.

== Biography ==
Born in Saint-Mont, France, Lamothe immigrated to Canada in 1953 and immediately got a job as a lumberjack in the Abitibi region of northern Quebec. In 1954 he began studying economics at the Université de Montréal. During his time as a student he became interested in cinema and began writing for several film publications. After graduating in 1958, he was immediately hired as a writer for Radio-Canada. In 1961 he was hired by the NFB and wrote Dimanche d'Amérique, his first screenplay, which became the first film by Gilles Carle. In 1962 he directed his first film, a short documentary entitled Manouane River Lumberjacks (Bûcherons de la Manouane). He directed his first feature-length fiction work in 1965, Dust from Underground (Poussière sur la ville); the film was not successful and Lamothe returned to documentary films. Lamothe has only made a handful of fiction films during his career, and he is best known and most respected for his documentaries. In his films, Lamothe most frequently explored social and economic themes, as well as activism for issues he passionately supported, especially with regard to indigenous people.

In 1980 he was awarded the Prix Albert-Tessier and in 1995 was made a member of the Order of Canada.

Gilles Vigneault's "Mon Pays" was written for Lamothe's 1965 film The Snow Has Melted on the Manicouagan (La neige a fondu sur la Manicouagan).

== Selected filmography ==
=== Features ===
- The Snow Has Melted on the Manicouagan (La neige a fondu sur la Manicouagan) - 1965
- Dust from Underground (Poussière sur la ville) - 1968
- Equinox (Équinoxe) - 1986
- Ernest Livernois, photographe - 1988
- Silencing the Guns (Le silence des fusils) - 1996

=== Documentaries ===
- Manouane River Lumberjacks (Bûcherons de la Manouane) (Short, 1962)
- De Montréal à Manicouagan (Short, 1963
- La moisson (Short, 1966)
- Le train du Labrador (Short, 1967)
- Au-delà des murs (Short, 1968)
- Ce soir-là, Gilles Vigneault... (1968)
- Actualités québécoises (Series, 1969)
- Pour une éducation de qualité (Series of 6 Shorts, 1969)
- Hell No Longer (Le mépris n'aura qu'un temps) (1970)
- Un homme et son boss (Short Co-Directed with Guy Borremans, 1970)
- Révolution industrielle (Short, 1970)
- Le train du roi (Short, 1970)
- La machine à vapeur (Short, 1971)
- Le monde de l'enfance (Short, 1971)
- Le technicien en arpentage minier (Short, 1971)
- A bon pied, bon oeil (Short, 1972)
- Les gars de Lapalme (Short Co-Directed with François Dupuis, 1972)
- Special Delivery (Short Co-Directed with François Dupuis, 1972)
- La route du fer (Short, 1972)
- Le système de la langue française (Series of 7 Shorts, 1972)
- A propos de méthodes (Series of 5 Shorts, 1973)
- Chronique des indiens du Nord-est du Québec (Series, 1973-1980)
  - Carcajou et le péril blanc (Series of 3 Features and 5 Shorts, 1973-1976)
  - La terre de l'homme (Series of 4 Features and 1 Short, 1976-1980)
- Qui? Quoi? Pourquoi? (Short, 1973)
- Te promènes tu souvent sur un lapin? (Short, 1973)
- Ti-Louis mijote un plan... (Short, 1973)
- Voyage sans détour (Short, 1974)
- La chasse aux Montagnais (Short, 1974)
- C'est dangereux ici (Short, 1978)
- Le collet à lièvre (Short, 1978)
- Le piège à martre (Short, 1978)
- La raquette (Short, 1978)
- Montage de la tente (Short, 1978)
- Géographie Montagnaise (Short, 1978)
- Vous avez droits, les autres aussi (Short, 1980)
- Thunder Drum (Mémoire battante) (Series of 3 Features, 1982-1983)
- Cultures amérindiennes (Series of 80 videos, 1984-2004)
- La conquête de l'amérique (Series of 2 Features, 1990-1992)
- L'écho des songes (1993)
- Dix portraits (Series, 1998)
- La terre mère (1998)
- Du rêve au libéralisme (1999)
- Mémoire antérieure (Series of 13 Shorts, 2005)
- Les pêcheurs acadiens de l'Île Lamèque (2007)
