= Jacques Lussier =

Canadian actor (1960–2024)

- Lussier as Beaujeu Martin in Sous le signe du lion in 1998
- Born: 1 March 1960; Montreal, Quebec, Canada
- Died: 14 April 2024 (aged 64); Montreal, Quebec, Canada
- Education: Conservatoire d'art dramatique de Montréal
- Years active: 1980s–2023

Jacques Lussier (1 March 1960 – 14 April 2024) was a Canadian actor of film, theatre, and television.

== Biography ==
Jacques Lussier was born in Montreal on 1 March 1960.

A graduate of the Conservatoire d'art dramatique de Montréal, Lussier acted mostly in the 1980s and 1990s. His credits include Les Filles de Caleb, Cormoran, Les Machos, Sous le sign du lion, Intimate Power and Monsieur le ministre. A bilingual, Lussier also acted in Grey Owl. His last credit was in Reasonable Doubt in 2023.

Lussier was the host of the game show Zizanie from 1990 to 1992. He also dubbed actors, including Jude Law, Brad Pitt, Jason Connery, Freddie Prinze Jr. and Rick Schroder.

Lussier was nominated for the Prix Gémeaux in 1998.

He died in Montreal on 14 April 2024, aged 64.

== Selected filmography ==
=== Television ===
- 1982: Monsieur le ministre: Thierry Robert
- 1986: Laurier: Henri Laurier
- 1990: Les Filles de Caleb: L'inspecteur Henri Douville
- 1990: Cormoran: Vincent Bellavance
- 1993: Blanche: L'inspecteur Henri Douville
- 1994: Scoop: Marc
- 1995: Les Grands Procès: Me Bienvenue
- 1995: Les Machos: Antoine Lorrain
- 1997: Sous le signe du lion: Beaujeu Martin
- 2002: L'Or: Jérôme Dulac
- 2005: Le Négociateur: Sergent Lebel
- 2006: René Lévesque: Jean-Roch Boivin
- 2006: Les Bougon: L'officier dactylo / Réal Louis Bolduc
- 2009: Les Boys: Médecin de Méo
- 2009: Mirador: René Duval

=== Film ===
- 1986: Intimate Power: Janvier
- 1994: Louis 19, King of the Airwaves: Le patron de Louis
- 1999: Grey Owl: François Dulac
