= Jean-Louis Millette =

- Born: 4 January 1935
- Died: 29 September 1999 (aged 64)

Jean-Louis Millette (French pronunciation: [ʒɑ̃ lwi milɛt]; 4 January 1935 – 29 September 1999) was a Canadian French-speaking actor and writer.

Millette was born in Montreal, Quebec, Canada. Millette's television career spanned over thirty years: he was a cast member of many of the best-known series in Quebec, including the children's series La Ribouldingue (which he also co-wrote), L'Héritage, Symphorien and Montréal P.Q. (in a role which earned him a Prix Gémeaux in 1994). He was also the voice of Abraham Simpson, Apu Nahasapeemapetilon and Waylon Smithers in the Quebec dubbing of The Simpsons. On the big screen, he played mostly supporting roles, most notably in Robert Lepage's first film The Confessional (Le Confessionnal).

However, Millette's most significant work was in theatre: he was a major figure of Quebec theatre and, in 1990, received the Prix Victor-Morin for outstanding achievement in theatre in Quebec. He was a member of the Théâtre de Quat'Sous when it was founded by Paul Buissonneau in 1956. Millette died suddenly in Montreal of a heart attack in September 1999. At the time, he was touring a one-man performance of Larry Tremblay's The Dragonfly of Chicoutimi. This role had earned him the Masque Prize (Quebec's annual prizes in theatre) for best acting performance.
