= Yvon Deschamps =

Canadian actor, author, and entertainment producer

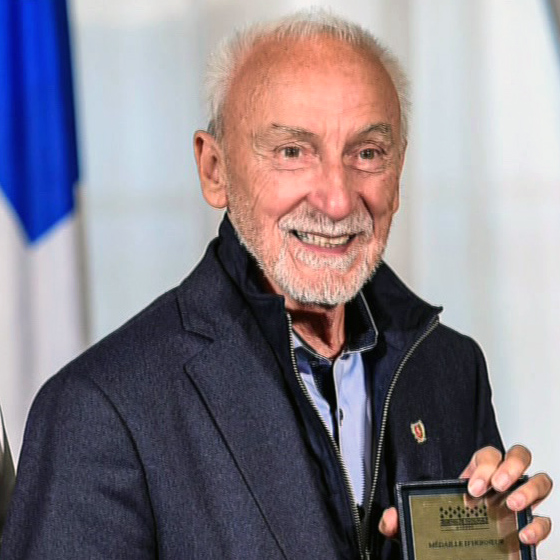
Yvon Deschamps in 2018

Yvon Deschamps CQ (born July 31, 1935, in Montreal, Quebec) is a Québécois author, actor, comedian and producer best known for his monologues. His social-commentary-tinged humour propelled him to prominence in Quebec popular culture in the 1970s and 1980s. Deschamps has been considered one of the greatest comedians in Quebec history.

== Biography ==
=== Beginnings ===
Yvon Deschamps was born in Montreal's working-class Saint-Henri district. He left school in 1951, after Grade 11, and in 1953 found work in the record library at Radio-Canada's new television service. It was at Radio-Canada that Deschamps discovered the performing arts; after attending a boulevard theatre piece starring Georges Groulx and Denise Pelletier, he added a taste for the theatre, and enrolled in acting classes with François Rozet and Paul Buissonneau. He took the stage for the first time in 1957 at the Théâtre universitaire canadien, playing Pylade in a production of Jean Racine's Andromaque.

In 1959, Deschamps was part of La Roulotte, Paul Buissonneau's travelling children's theatre. The following year he married Mireille Lachance (the two would divorce in 1967). In 1961 he became friends with Claude Léveillée, becoming his drummer, even though the man had actually never played the drums before. In 1963 he formed a company with Léveillée and several other artists at Buissonneau's Théâtre de Quat'Sous. In 1965 he played his first film role in Jean-Claude Lord's Deliver Us from Evil (Délivrez-nous du mal), although the film was not released theatrically until 1969.

That same year Deschamps left his short career as a musician behind and opened Le Fournil, a restaurant in Old Montreal, followed by Saint-Amable in 1966. Both would end up bankrupt a few years later, but while they were open Deschamps hosted his Boîte à Clémence, a boîte à chanson hosted by Clémence DesRochers, participating in the Le monde sont drôles (People are Funny) and Sois toi-même(Be Yourself) shows which opened there in 1967. The latter played a special role in his career, because that is where the Yvon Deschamps "character" and his "good boss" role appeared for the first time:)

=== L'Ostidshow ===
In the winter of 1968, finding himself broke and occasionally sleeping on friends couches with new girlfriend Judi Richards, Deschamps took a job at the Quat'Sous offered by his friend Buissonneau. Buissonneau had just lost Michel Tremblay's celebrated play Les Belles-sœurs to the Rideau Vert theatre, and was looking for a play to finish the season with.

Deschamps proposed a musical review to Louise Forestier and Robert Charlebois with Mouffe on board, and very little rehearsal time. The result would be known as L'Osstidcho (L'hostie de show or "The freaking show"), a show that would revolutionize Quebec song. Inspired by Arlo Guthrie's Alice's Restaurant, Deschamps made his first real monologue part of the review when Robert Charlebois did not want to learn his lines for the dialogue (he decided to strum the guitar instead). In Les unions, qu'ossa donne? (Unions, What are they Good For?), Deschamps played a naïve worker extolling the great generosity and good-heartedness of his boss, making it clear that reality was not quite so rosy:

One time, my wife falls sick real bad, so the hospital phoned. It was a quarter past two, the boss answers. He comes to see me, and says, "Your wife is in the emergency ward."

He says, "Look, don't make yourself crazy about this! Just make like nothing's happened, keep on working. If anything does happen, I'll let you know."

"Not just any boss that would've done something like that!"

Deschamps would write a number of other monologues, including Le monde sont malades (People are Crazy), C'est extraordinaire (That's Really Something), and La Saint-Jean (June 24), as well as Nigger Black and Pépère (Grandpa), both of which went back to the character's childhood.

=== Glory ===
Following the success of Osstidcho, Yvon Deschamps' career skyrocketed. In 1969 he presented L'argent (Money) as the opening act for singer Marie Laforêt's tour, then Le bonheur (Happiness) at the Théâtre du Canada; these two monologues would become his second album. Deschamps put on his first solo show at the Patriot, where he would go on to appear some 310 times.

In 1970 Deschamps released his third album, Le p'tit Jésus/Le fœtus (Baby Jesus/The Foetus) and appeared more than 240 times at the Place des Arts's Théâtre Maisonneuve, where he launched monologues like Dans ma cour (In My Yard) and Cable TV. The following year another 180 performances were held, including five consecutive weeks sold out.

In 1971 he had a film role in Jean Bissonnette's Hold on to Daddy's Ears (Tiens-toi bien après les oreilles à papa).

Deschamps presented his shows On va s'en sortir (We'll Manage) at the Théâtre Saint-Denis in 1972 and La libération de la femme (Women's Lib) at the Patriote in 1973 and 1974, giving some 150 performances of the latter show. In 1975, he toured for nine months to put on L'histoire sainte (History of the Sacred).

In 1977, Deschamps returned with a new, untitled show which would headline for 16 weeks at the Place des Arts and show 102 times over that period. His first daughter with now-wife Judi Richards, Annie, was born. For a brief period he attempted to pierce the English-language market with a California tour, and appeared three times on Peter Gzowski's popular CBC programme (one of these appearances is archived in the first volume of his DVD collection), further appearing on the CBC's Let's Save Canada Hour. He soon reconsidered moving his new family to the United States to essentially 'start over' and went home to Montreal.

In 1979, he headed back yet again to the Place des Arts, with a difficult show which included his La petite mentale (the retarded girl) and La manipulation monologues. Deschamps himself called the show a "catastrophe" and would later recall that "they ended up writing off my career." He had a second daughter, Karine, and came back in 1982 with C'est tout seul qu'on est l'plus nombreux (We are the biggest crowd alone). Although the public hesitated at first—only 5000 tickets had sold a week before the show opened—the show was very well received; as Deschamps put it, "I got wise and, ten days later, began selling out a room a day."

The following year Deschamps headlined two weeks at the Théâtre de la Ville de Paris. It would be the swan song of the most fruitful period of his career: seeing a new generation of Québécois comedians like Ding et Dong growing up around him, and troubled by what he saw as a political correctness movement in the 1980s, Deschamps chose 1983 to bow out as a monologuist with his farewell show, Un voyage dans le temps (A Journey Through Time).

=== Departure and return ===
In 1985, Samedi de rire (Saturday Laughs), a one-hour variety show with comedic skits and a special guest (musical or other) carried on Saturday nights at 7 p.m. on Radio-Canada. Yvon Deschamps was the host, and appeared alongside Normand Chouinard, Normand Brathwaite, Pauline Martin and Michèle Deslauriers. Among the characters he developed there was the famous storyteller persona of Ti-Blanc Lebrun who would swallow his harmonica before the end of every story and be unable to continue. Seventy-eight episodes and two "best of" recaps would air between 1985 and 1989. Judi Richards and Yvon Deschamps welcomed their 3rd and last daughter, Sarah-Émilie in 1986.

The experience of weekly television allowed Deschamps, now in his 50s, to keep a hand in the comedy business and stay in touch with Quebec audiences, but with a much lower level of stress than his one-man shows had involved. That said, he has presented occasional monologues in between two skits. Deschamps then launched CTYVON (ITSYVON) on the heels of Samedi de rire's success. CTYVON was a daily program filmed in a television studio, half sitcom and half parody of other television programs. But the show did not have a chance to find an audience as the at-first-unpopular Samedi de Rire did, with Radio-Canada yanking it off the air after a few months for low ratings(1989–1990).

After eight years away from the stage, Deschamps decided to wade back in one last time with a new show, U.S. qu'on s'en va? (What's Next for U.S.?), performed live 140 times in 1992 and 1993, and broadcast on Radio-Canada television. Following the show's success he moved into semi-retirement, purchasing in 1996 the Manoir Rouville-Campbell, a historic hotel property, a Tudor Manor, in Mont-Saint-Hilaire in Quebec's Montérégie region. He helped keep the hotel running during the off-season by opening a small nightclub there called Boîte à Yvon (Yvon's Club) in which he would perform some of his classic and more recent material to the 300-capacity crowd. An album, Yvon Deschamps au Manoir Rouville-Campbell, was issued in 1999. Yvon then built a bigger hall called l'Orangeraie in the Manoir with a scenic view of the manoir grounds and the Richelieu river.

The semi-retirement did not last, either, however. Following pressure from contemporaries and friends, such as wife Judi Richards and Normand Brathwaite, who were adamant that his newer material should be shared with larger audiences, Deschamps got back to work. The result, Comment ça, 2000? (2000 Already?), was performed in front of sold-out houses in the Manoir, at Montreal's Théâtre Corona and Quebec City's Palais Montcalm, then hit the road for a cross-Quebec tour in 2001 and 2002, culminating in the Comment ca, 2000... 2001... 2002?

Since 2000, the Boîte à Yvon has regularly presented emerging Quebec comedians. In 2001 Deschamps was named a Knight of the National Order of Quebec by Quebec's premier, Bernard Landry.

In 2006, Deschamps toured with his wife of 35 years in the show 'Judi et Yvon font une scène' where they shared the stage equally for the first time. It was a sold-out success.

The Manoir was sold in 2006, but in his 70s Deschamps shows no sign of stopping. As one of the most prolific hosts and performers the 'Festival Juste pour rire' has ever had, he presented one new or re-worked monologue for each gala show for the festival's 25th anniversary in the summer of 2007. They paid homage to him with a special gala.

He has three daughters, Annie, Karine and Sarah-Émilie.

== Style ==
Yvon Deschamps' monologues were known for their unrelenting irony, and often buried a message that was completely opposite to what the stage character was saying literally. For Deschamps' first monologue, Les unions, qu'ossa donne?, he created an exploited worker who incarnated the Québécois self-image of a historic past as water-carriers and hewers of wood, and who remained resolutely blind to his exploitation at the hands of his "good" boss.

In the beginning, Yvon Deschamps' never-named "character" was distinguished by his spectacular naïveté, which served as a vehicle for Deschamps to tackle delicate subjects such as racism. In Nigger Black, for instance, the character recalled boyhood surprise upon learning that "Nègres" were no more nor less than human beings like him, neither better nor worse:

Us, we had some on our street; they lived in the same houses we did, went to the same schools. Hey, even some of us had some, there were French-Canadian "nègres". One of 'em was in my class, his name was Robert. Hey, that was the first time I'd seen a "nègre" named Robert!

But, very quickly, Deschamps felt the need to go further outside the usual boundaries. His character began to be more self-assured, his remarks more pointed:

In 1972, I decided to write differently and to stage my theatrical shows. It was all about evoking different emotions in the audiences. Discomfort, too. I yelled at my musicians. I pretended to forget things for five minutes. I once even had the sprinklers go off during a show. Until the beginning of the 1980s, I figured I had to go as far as possible in my live shows. My audiences had seen everything. They left the show with their heads between their legs.

In L'intolérance, Deschamps tried something riskier: going beyond what his audience could possibly accept. The monologue started quietly, after a long introduction and a song (On va s'en sortir, We'll Manage), with the character warning the public against the dangers of intolerance, which had caused wars, massacres, genocides and other human follies—all that, punctuated with a diatribe against "faggots". Deschamps' character cited as an example the Biafra genocide, where intolerance had resulted in "millions of little niggers dying of hunger", adding that it didn't bother him too much since, after all, these were only "niggers". At the same time, Deschamps would hasten to add, intolerance had also killed "real people" – the "almost Whites", which were the "Light Greys", by which he meant Jews.

Six million Jews died because Hitler, he did some of that intolerance. He was nuts, a goddamn maniac, you know? Yeah, that guy, Hitler, he said that the Jews didn't smell right or dress right, and they had those braids, and they stunk and they didn't wash and they bought everything...

I happen to know they're like that, but you can't kill them for that! Jews, you just make sure you don't have any around you have to deal with, that's all.

The monologue continued to unwind, and the character would explain how he had kicked a Jewish family out of their neighbourhood as a teenager, punctuated by exclamations of "damn dirty Jews". He would push and push until a member of the audience showed some sign of disgust. The character would at that point turn to the audience member and accuse him of showing the same intolerance he'd been warning the public about for the last twenty minutes. Deschamps' character would add that an army should really be mounted against the intolerants, ending the monologue with the sounds of a regiment marching, fading into a reprise of the opening song, On va s'en sortir.

Deschamps always admitted being a little bit frightened when he performed this monologue.

== Influence on Quebec society ==
"From Martin Matte to Patrick Huard, many young comedians today see Deschamps as their spiritual father, the man who opened the doors to today's comedy movement. A little bit like Michel Tremblay in the theatre, who brought a new generation of playwrights into the world, Yvon Deschamps gave Quebec comedy its stamp of approval."

C'est avec Yvon Deschamps que débute une nouvelle tradition d'humour au Québec qui se perpétue de nos jours avec un très grand nombre d'artistes de tous âges. Claude Meunier, un de nos plus talentueux humoristes, a dit de Deschamps qu'il est « un personnage historique qui a probablement le plus contribué à la réflexion sur la question nationale. C'est un personnage écouté, un éveilleur social et politique. » Un autre humoriste de talent, Pierre Légaré a écrit « Tous les humoristes québécois, sans exception, utilisent une ou plusieurs voies qu'a découvertes, tracées, ou pavées Yvon. »

"He's a guy who could paint a wicked satirical portrait of our society, then laugh cruelly about our shortcomings. Deschamps said some outrageous things, and they went over because it was him, and we knew that coming from him, there was nothing mean or cruel about it." — Gilles Latulippe

== Albums ==
- Les unions, qu'ossa donne (1969, Polydor, 542–503)
- L'argent... ou le bonheur (1969, Polydor, 542–508)
- Le p'tit Jésus / Le fœtus (1970, Polydor, 2424.017)
- Cable TV (1971, Polydor, 2424.033)
- On va s'en sortir (1972, Polydor, 2424.062)
- La sexualité (1972, Polydor, 2424.072)
- La libération de la femme (1973, Kébec-Disc, KD-700)
- Bill 22 (1974, Kébec-Disc, KD-701)
- L'histoire sainte (1975, Kébec-Disc, KD-904)
- Yvon Deschamps en anglais (1976, Direction, 10001)
- Au Théâtre Maisonneuve (1977, Kébec-Disc, 956/957)
- Yvon Deschamps (1979, Yvon-Deschamps, YD-984)
- C'est tout seul qu'on est l'plus nombreux (1982, Bo-Mon, BM-562/563)
- Yvon Deschamps (1987, Bo-Mon, BM-564)
- U.S. qu'on s'en va? (1993, GSI Musique, BMCD 566)
- Yvon Deschamps au Manoir Rouville-Campbell (1999, GSI Musique, BMCD 567)
- Comment ça, 2000... 2001... 2002? (2003, GSI Musique, BMCD 2568)

== Bibliography ==
- Paquette, Claude (1997). Yvon Deschamps : un aventurier fragile. Montreal: Québec/Amérique. ISBN 2-89037920-5.
- Deschamps, Yvon (1998). Tout Deschamps : trente ans de monologues et de chansons. Outremont: Lanctôt Éditeur. ISBN 2-89485-064-6. Archived from the original on November 17, 2015.
