= Gilles Vigneault =

Canadian poet and singer-songwriter (born 1928)

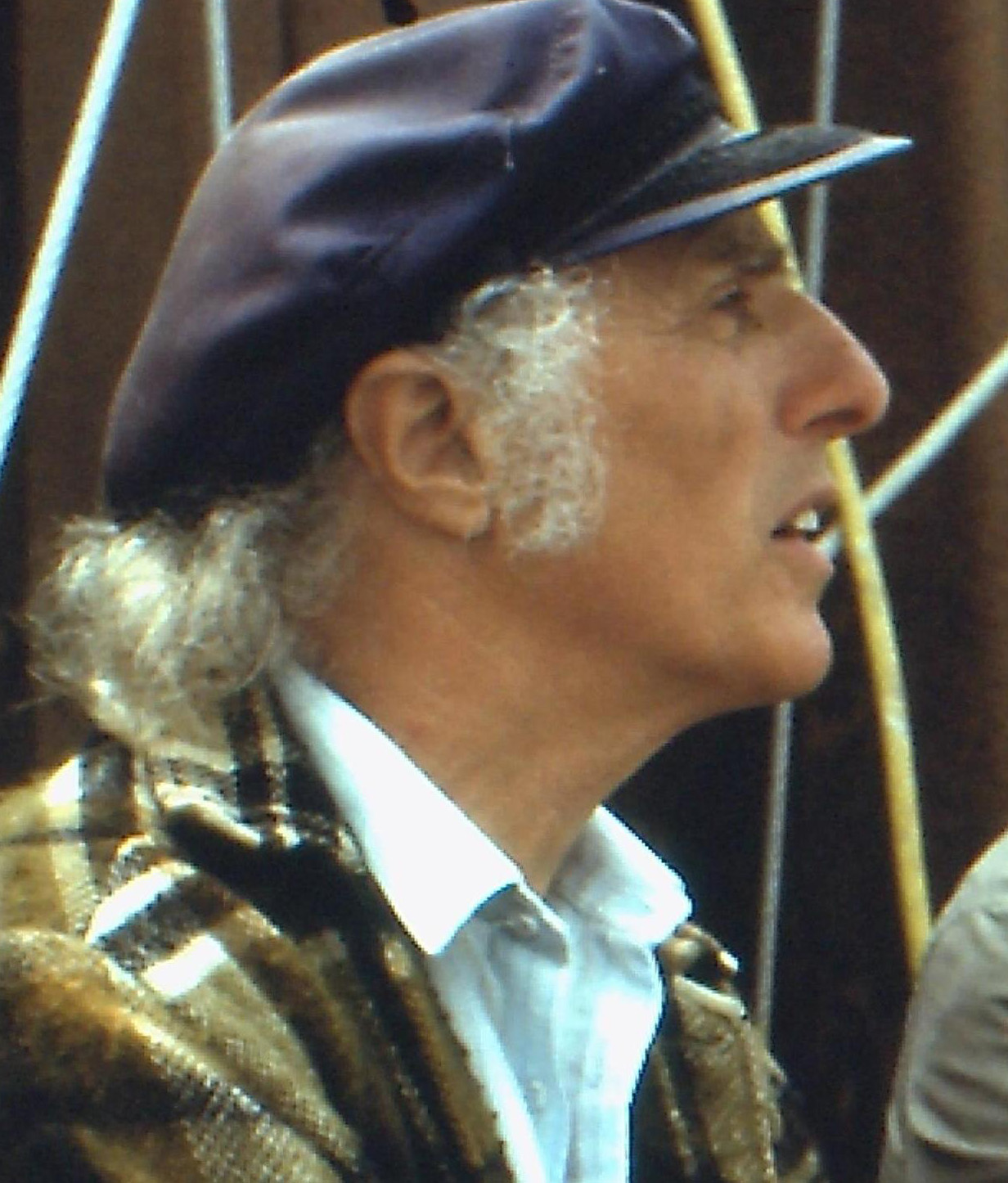
- Vigneault in 1989

Background information
- Born: 27 October 1928 (age 97); Natashquan, Quebec, Canada
- Genre: Folk music
- Occupations: Poet; publisher; singer-songwriter
- Instrument: Vocals
- Years active: 1959–present
- Website: gillesvigneault.com

Gilles Vigneault GOQ (French pronunciation: [ʒil viɲo]; born 27 October 1928) is a Canadian poet, publisher, singer-songwriter, and Quebec nationalist and sovereigntist. Two of his songs are considered by many to be Quebec's unofficial anthems: "Mon pays" and "Gens du pays", and his line Mon pays ce n'est pas un pays, c'est l'hiver (My country is not a country, it is winter, from "Mon Pays") became a proverb in Quebec. Vigneault is a Grand Officer of the National Order of Quebec, Knight of the Legion of Honour, and Officer of the Ordre des Arts et des Lettres.

== Life and career ==
Vigneault was born in Natashquan, in the Côte-Nord region of Quebec.

He started writing poetry during his studies at the seminary in Rimouski, and by the 1950s was publishing poems and writing songs for other performers. In 1959, he founded the publishing house Les Éditions de l'Arc to distribute his publications. His first collection, Étraves, was published in 1959.

In 1960, Vigneault made his singing debut at the L'Arlequin club in Quebec City, followed by a successful Montreal concert later that year. In 1962, he recorded his first album, Gilles Vigneault, and received the Grand Prix du Disque from Montreal radio station CKAC. His reputation grew in Quebec and beyond with the success of his song "Mon Pays", from the soundtrack of the NFB film The Snow Has Melted on the Manicouagan (La neige a fondu sur la Manicouagan) in 1965.

Vigneault's reputation as a songwriter and performer continued to spread and he became popular not only in Quebec, but also in English Canada and Europe. He performed in major Canadian concert halls, including Montreal's Place des Arts, the National Arts Centre in Ottawa, and at Toronto's Massey Hall. In Europe, he toured in France, Switzerland, Poland, Belgium, and Luxembourg.

The mid-1970s saw Vigneault's participation in several major events. On 13 August 1974, 130,000 spectators came together on the Plains of Abraham for the Superfrancofête, where Vigneault participated in a historic concert alongside Félix Leclerc and Robert Charlebois. The concert was recorded and released as the album J'ai vu le loup, le renard, le lion. At the Saint-Jean-Baptiste Day concert "Les 5 Jean-Baptistes" on Montreal's Mount Royal on 24 June 1976, Gilles Vigneault performed together with Robert Charlebois, Claude Léveillée, Jean-Pierre Ferland, and Yvon Deschamps. This concert was recorded and released as 1 fois 5, which later received the Grand Prix du Disque (the Charles Cros award). In October 2022, he received an honorary doctorate from Université TÉLUQ for his lifetime achievements, notably his contribution to Québécois identity.

Vigneault's political views have remained strongly in favour of national sovereignty for Quebec. During the 2014 Quebec general election campaign, he supported the Parti Québécois.

The main subjects of Vigneault's writing are Quebec and its people, as well as human relationships, love, and everyday life. Vigneault is also concerned with environmental issues and has written songs and tales for children.

His childhood reminiscences about his upbringing were filmed by Michel Moreau for the 1993 documentary film A Childhood in Natashquan (Une enfance à Natashquan).

In 2016, Vigneault received the honorary distinction of Compagnon des arts et des lettres du Québec from the Conseil des arts et des lettres du Québec. In 2017, he received an honorary Doctor of Literature degree from Carleton University.

== Family ==
Vigneault has seven children: Michel, Louis, François (a poet and lyricist), Pascale, Guillaume (a novelist), Jessica (a pianist and singer), and Benjamin (a percussionist).

== Discography (partial) ==
Gilles Vigneault (1962)
  - Jos Monferrand
  - Petite gloire et pauvre fortune
  - Quand j'ai chaussé les bottes (poem)
  - Jos Hébert
  - J'ai pour toi un lac
  - Caillou La Pierre
  - Am'nez-en d'la pitoune
  - Lorsque mon père (poem)
  - Jean-du-Sud
  - Jack Monoloy
  - Quand vous mourrez de nos amours
  - La danse à Saint-Dilon
  - Guillaume Vigneault (fils)
Gilles Vigneault chante et récite (1963)
  - Tam ti delam
  - Ma jeunesse
  - Quelqu'un était ici (poem)
  - Ballade de l'été
  - Si les bateaux
  - John Débardeur
  - Du milieu du pont
  - Chanson du temps perdu
  - J'ai fait mon ciel d'un nuage (poem)
  - Ballade de l'hiver; Pendant que...
  - Zidor le prospecteur
Gilles Vigneault vol. 3 (1964)
  - Larguez les amarres
  - L'air du voyageur
  - Fer et titane
  - Money-bum
  - Jean-Baptiste
  - La plus courte chanson
  - Tit-oeil
  - Le doux chagrin
À la Comédie-Canadienne (1965)
  - Présentation
  - Les gens de mon pays
  - Le livre
  - Hier la ville
  - Souviens-toi
  - Ti-Franc la patate
  - Ti-Paul
  - Tombe la nuit
  - Les menteries
  - La musique
  - Mon pays
Mon pays (1966)
  - Mon pays
  - La rue St-Jean
  - La fleur du temps
  - Avec les vieux mots
  - Mon ami Léo
  - Bébé la guitare
  - La chanson démodée
  - Le vent
  - Les corbeaux
  - Jean-Jean
  - Les semelles de la nuit
  - Le petit bonhomme
Gilles Vigneault enregistré à Paris (1966)
  - Petite gloire pauvre fortune
  - Avec les vieux mots
  - Jean-du-sud
  - Si les bateaux
  - Mon pays
  - C'est le temps
  - J'ai pour toi un lac
  - Jack Monoloy
  - Doux
  - Pendant que
  - La danse à St-Dilon
La Manikoutai (1967)
  - Était-ce femme... (poem)
  - La Manikoutai
  - Quand vous mourrez de nos amours
  - Ma mie est de retour
  - Vos mains; Le vent de la mer
  - J'ai un pays; Ce que je dis
  - Jean Bourgeois
  - Dites-moi
  - Je ferai les jours de beau temps... (poem)
  - La lune chinoise
Le nord du nord (1968)
  - Le nord du nord
  - Comment comment
  - Berlu
  - Autant de temps
  - Fer et tit
  - Tire mon coeur
  - L'horloge
  - Tout l'monde est malheureux
  - Ah! que l'hiver
  - Vu
Les voyageurs (1969)
  - Larguez les amarres
  - Mon bateau et mon quai
  - Poussière sur la ville
  - Sur la vitre des automnes
  - Je ne dirai plus
  - Mon pays II
  - Les voyageurs
  - Quand elle dit
  - Le temps passe
  - Berceuse pour ne pas endormir
  - La complainte
Musicorama: Olympia 1969 (1969)
  - Introduction
  - Tam ti delam
  - J'ai pour toi un lac
  - Jos Monferrand
  - Pendant que
  - Les voyageurs
  - Quand vous mourrez de nos amours
  - Jack Monoloy
  - Monologue
  - Fer et tit
  - Mon pays
  - Bébé la guitare
  - Le doux chagrin
  - Zidor le prospecteur
  - Les gens de mon pays
  - La Manikoutai
  - La danse à St-Dilon
Les grands succès de Gilles Vigneault (1971)
- (two-record "greatest hits" compilation)
  - Jos Monferrand
  - Lorsque mon père / Jean-du-sud
  - Am'nez-en d'la pitoune
  - Jack Monoloy
  - La danse à Saint-Dilon
  - Larguez les amarres
  - Fer et titane
  - Pendant que
  - Tam ti delam
  - Zidor le prospecteur
  - Mon pays
  - La Manikoutai
  - Les voyageurs
  - J'ai un pays
  - Bébé la guitare
  - Le nord du Nord
  - Tout le monde est malheureux
  - Ah! que l'hiver
  - Berceuse pour ne pas endormir
  - Mon pays II
Le temps qu'il fait sur mon pays (1971)
  - Le voyageur sédentaire
  - Vague est le pont, ici-ailleurs
  - Chanson pour Bob Dylan
  - L'eau de l'ennui
  - L'enfuie
  - Le silence
  - Les robots
  - Je m'ennuie
  - Chanson de la couleur du ciel
  - La tite toune; Un enfant
  - On met beaucoup de temps
  - Le temps qu'il fait sur mon pays
C'est le temps (1971)
- (two-record compilation)
  - La rue St-Jean
  - La fleur du temps
  - La chanson démodée
  - Le vent; Les corbeaux
  - Les semelles de la nuit
  - Le petit bonhomme
  - Petite gloire, pauvre fortune
  - Avec les vieux mots
  - Si les bateaux
  - C'est le temps
  - J'ai pour toi un lac
  - Quand vous mourrez de nos amours
  - Ma mie est de retour
  - Le vent de la mer
  - Ce que je dis
  - Jean Bourgeois
  - Les gens de mon pays
  - Le doux chagrin
  - Tombée la nuit
Pays du fond de moi (1973)
  - Il me reste un pays
  - Le galet
  - Ton père est parti
  - Maintenant
  - Les cerfs-volants
  - Parlez-moi un peu d'amour
  - Gros Pierre
  - Les voyageries
  - Berceuse
  - Je chante pour...
TNM 73 (1973)
  - On n'a jamais l'hiver qu'on veut
  - Beau voyageur
  - Quand je ferai ta chanson
  - Paulu Gazette
  - Quand nous partirons pour la Louisiane
  - Lucky Too Too;
  - Comptine pour endormir l'enfant qui ne veut rien savoir
  - L'été
  - La turlute
J'ai planté un chêne (1976)
  - J'ai planté un chêne
  - Chanson du 29 février
  - Tit-Nor
  - Une branche à la fenêtre
  - I Went To The Market
  - Gens du Pays
  - Quand la tendresse vient...
  - Faut que je me réveille
  - Le bonheur
  - Les neuf couplets
  - La queste du pays
À l'encre blanche (1977)
  - Sabots
  - Petite heure
  - 17 décembre
  - Par un hiver
  - Sous verre
  - Intérieur
  - Par la fenêtre
  - L'été; Marine
  - Migrations
  - Neiges
  - À Vêpres
  - Balise
  - L'homme
  - Une lettre
  - À contre-temps
  - Un visiteur
  - Le coureur
  - L'errante
  - Le fou
  - L'héritier
  - Sables
Gilles Vigneault à Bobino (1977)
- (two-record set)
  - Gens du pays
  - Les gens de mon pays
  - Il me reste un pays
  - J'ai planté un chêne
  - Jack Monoloy
  - Gros Pierre
  - Jean-du-sud
  - Monologue
  - Une branche à la fenêtre
  - I Went To The Market
  - Quand la tendresse vient
  - Faut que je me réveille
  - Zidor le prospecteur
  - Fer et titane
  - Tit-Nor
  - Quand nous partirons pour la Louisiane
  - La queste du pays
  - La danse à Saint-Dilon
  - Gens du pays
Comment vous donner des nouvelles (1978)
  - Comment vous donner des nouvelles
  - Timor la peur
  - Il y a quelque chose
  - Pour t'avoir montré la surface (poem)
  - Encore une chanson d'amour
  - Je viens d'écrire une lettre
  - Mettez votre parka
  - Les quatre pays
  - Vos mots les miens (poem)
  - Sur le bout de la langue
  - Tante Irène
  - J'ai rentré le bois
Les quatre saisons de Piquot (1978)
  - Le printemps: le pont
  - L'été: le cerf-volant
  - L'automne: le trésor
  - L'hiver: le renard
Avec les mots du dimanche (1979)
- (two-record set)
  - Avec les vieux mots
  - Au doux milieu de vous
  - La vieille Margot
  - Le grand Paulo
  - La mi-carême
  - Une chanson blanche
  - Les amours les travaux
  - Je m'ennuie d'un pays
  - P'tit Louis
  - Les mots du dimanche
  - J'ai pour toi un lac
  - Jos Monferrand
  - Si on causait deux mots (monologue du oui)
  - Les menteries (nouvelle version)
  - Le pays de chacun
  - Il me reste un pays
Combien de fois faut-il parler d'amour (1982)
  - Chacun fait selon sa façon
  - Petite berceuse du début de la colonie
  - Les beaux métiers
  - La complainte du lendemain
  - La tourterelle
  - L'arbre du temps
  - Au fond de nous
  - Ouvrez les oreilles
  - Dame Nostalgie
  - La vieille école
  - L'enfant et l'eau
  - Combien de fois faut-il parler d'amour
Un jour, je ferai mon grand cerf-volant (1983)
  - Le grand cerf-volant
  - Mademoiselle Émilie
  - L'enfant et le pommier
  - Le chemin
  - L'étranger
  - Les trois danses
  - Tit-Dé
  - La nuit
  - Avec un bout de bois
  - La Vaillante
  - Chaque fois
Mets donc tes plus belles chansons ensemble (1986)
- (compilation)
  - Tam ti delam
  - Jack Monoloy
  - Le doux chagrin
  - Les trois danses
  - Si les bateaux
  - Les gens de mon pays
  - Tout le monde est malheureux
  - Ton père est parti
  - Jos Monferrand
  - Chacun fait selon sa façon
  - Il me reste un pays
  - Mettez votre parka
  - J'ai planté un chêne
  - Gros Pierre
  - Mademoiselle Émilie
  - Gens du pays
  - I Went To The Market
  - Les beaux métiers
  - Le grand cerf-volant
  - La danse à Saint-Dilon
Les îles (1987)
  - Marche avec moi
  - Printemps
  - Ti-Mand tout faire
  - La chanson de l'eau
  - La découverte
  - Le terminateur
  - Dans les paysages
  - Le clairon le tambour
  - Les îles de l'enfance
  - Le danseur
  - Si tu n'es plus
  - Une Île
1960-1990: Chemin faisant, cent et une chansons (1990)
- CD 1
  - Quand j'ai chaussé les bottes (poem)
  - Tam ti delam
  - J'ai pour toi un lac
  - Jean-du-sud
  - Si les bateaux
  - Jos Monferrand
  - Du milieu du pont
  - Jos Hébert
  - Quand vous mourrez de nos amours
  - Jack Monoloy
  - Ballade de l'hiver
  - Zidor le prospecteur
  - Fer et titane
  - John Débardeur
  - Mon ami Léo (poem)
  - Bébé la guitare
  - Le doux chagrin
  - La danse à Saint-Dilon
  CD 2
  - Ma jeunesse
  - Vos mots, les miens (poem)
  - En descendant la rue Saint-Jean
  - Ce que je dis
  - Pendant que...
  - C'est le temps
  - Ballade de l'été
  - Beau voyageur
  - Je chante pour...
  - Ouvrez les oreilles
  - Jean Bourgeois
  - Une branche à la fenêtre
  - On n'a jamais l'hiver qu'on veut
  - La plus courte chanson
  - La Manikoutai
  - Prenez soin des mots, Madame (poem)
  - Les gens de mon pays
  CD 3
  - Avec les vieux mots
  - Quand la tendresse
  - Ah! que l'hiver...
  - L'horloge
  - Gros Pierre
  - Encore une chanson
  - Mon pays
  - J'ai planté un chêne
  - Le petit bonhomme
  - Je viens d'écrire une lettre
  - Faut que je me réveille
  - Berceuse
  - Le livre
  - Paul-Eu-Gazette
  - Ton père est parti
  - Un enfant
  - L'enfant et le pommier
  - Je m'ennuie d'un pays
  CD 4
  - Le temps qu'il fait sur mon pays
  - Vague est le pont / Ici, ailleurs
  - Comment vous donner des nouvelles
  - Le voyageur sédentaire
  - J'ai rentré le bois
  - La tite toune
  - Le bonheur
  - Les robots
  - Tit-nor
  - Berlu
  - Autant le temps
  - Tout l'monde est malheureux
  - Chanson du 29 février
  - Le nord du Nord
  - La chanson démodée
  - Chanson pour Bob Dylan
  - On voudrait tout dire (poem)
  - Quand nous partirons pour la Louisiane
  CD 5
  - Les quatre pays
  - Au doux milieu de vous
  - Petite berceuse du début de la colonie
  - La tourterelle
  - Les beaux métiers
  - La complainte du lendemain
  - Mademoiselle Émilie
  - Les mots du dimanche
  - Au fond de nous
  - Maintenant
  - Tante Irène
  - Parlez-moi
  - Pour t'avoir montré la surface (poem)
  - Mettez vot' parka
  - La découverte
  - Les amours, les travaux
  - Le grand cerf-volant
  - Gens du pays
  CD 6
  - Dans les paysages
  - Le chemin
  - Chaque fois
  - Comptine pour endormir l'enfant qui ne veut rien savoir
  - Dame nostalgie / La vieille école
  - Le terminateur
  - Une chanson blanche
  - Chacun fait selon sa façon
  - L'étranger
  - Marche avec moi
  - La nuit
  - Le danseur
  - Les îles de l'enfance
  - Chanson de l'eau
  - Berceuse pour Julie
  - Une île
  - Il me reste un pays
  - Vos mots que je lance
Le chant du portageur (1992)
  - Lettre à mes parents
  - On ne sait jamais
  - Les trois perdrix
  - Monsieur Ptitpas
  - Lettre à mes parents (suite)
  - L'odeur des feux de feuilles
  - D'où qu'ils soient dans le monde
  - Amour est un beau langage
  - Les trois chemins
  - C'est ce soir qu'ils dansent
  - Le reel du portageur
  - Une lettre de Monsieur Ptitpas à Isabelle
  - Il est quatre heures
  - Quand tu vas chez l'marchand
  - Au fil des jours
  - La parole et le silence
  - Dans la nuit des mots
  - Le montagnais
  - Le pays que je veux faire
  - Le courrier
  - Le chant du portageur
  - Sa journée faite
C'est ainsi que j'arrive à toi (1996)
  - Les outils
  - Le trésor
  - Charlie-Jos
  - La mer, l'amour, la mort
  - J'ai mal à la terre
  - La source
  - Je ne saurai jamais (poem)
  - Au jardin de mon père
  - Les arpilles
  - Au loin sur la mer
  - L'homme
  - Chacun porte son âge
Voyagements : En direct du théâtre Champlain (2001)
- (CD box set containing 2 disks)
  CD 1
  - Le voyageur sédentaire
  - Si les bateaux
  - La découverte
  - Bonsoir...
  - Le temps qu'il fait
  - En descendant la rue St-Jean
  - J'ai sur ma table de travail...
  - Ton père est parti
  - Pêcheur l'été
  - Le prospecteur (poem)
  - Zidor le prospecteur
  - J'ai pour toi un lac
  - Elle a dénoué ses cheveux
  - Beau voyageur
  - Hélas...Tit Nor
  - Mais le voyage
  - Ah! que l'hiver
  - Le doux chagrin
  - L'étranger
  CD 2
  - Nuit
  - La lune chinoise - En une époque...
  - La source - Mais la source...
  - C'est le temps
  - J'ai mal à la terre
  - Et pendant que...
  - On ne sait jamais
  - Pendant que les bateaux
  - Le mots du dimanche - Mais l'amour dans les chansons...
  - Les arpilles
  - À faire se rencontrer...
  - Quand je reviendrai... (poem)
  - Les amours les travaux
  - Maintenant
  - Le nord du nord
  - Avec nos mots
  - Tombé la nuit
Au bout du cœur (2003)
  - Au bout du cœur
  - Madame Adrienne
  - Les éléments
  - Le reel de Béris
  - Après les milliers
  - Je demeure où l'amour loge
  - Théo l'orphelin
  - Que retenir
  - La ballade d'un sans abri
  - Les sirènes
  - Le premier soir des noces
  - Le reel de la chaise noire
  - Dans le plus noir de la nuit
  - Comptine en mode zen
  - Entre vos mains
  - Épiloque : Au bout du cœur
Gilles Vigneault et les Charbonniers de l'enfer (2007)
  - La découverte
  - Les sirènes
  - Berlu
  - Théo l'orphelin
  - Charlie-Jos
  - Tante Irène - J'ai rentré le bois
  - Ouvrez le oreilles
  - Gens du pays
  - Faut que j'me réveille
  - Le grand cerf-volant
  - La tite toune - Tout l'monde est malheureux
  - Au jardin de mon père
  - Mettez vot' parka
Arriver chez soi (2008)
  - Chemin faisant
  - Les mots (prologue)
  - Lucas l'écolo
  - Je n'ai pas cessé de t'aimer
  - Jack Tattoo
  - Comme tout arrive
  - C'est dans la nature des choses
  - Dévorer des kilomètres
  - C'est à Natashquan...
  - Une journée sans portable
  - Internaute
  - Arriver chez soi
  - Entre musique et poésie (epilogue)
Les années soixante (2010)
  - Tam ti delam
  - Jean-du-Sud
  - Bebe la guitare
  - Quand vous mourrez de nos amours
  - Mon pays
  - Jos. Monferrand
  - Tout l'monde est malheureux
  - J'ai pour toi un lac
  - Jack Monoloy
  - Jos. Hebert
  - Si les bateaux
  - Le Manikoutai
  - Le doux chagrin
  - La danse à St. Dilon
  - Pendant que...
  - Les gens de mon pays
  - Le nord du nord
Retrouvailles (2010)
  - La danse à St. Dilon
  - Quand vous mourrez de nos amours
  - Madame Adrienne
  - Gros Pierre
  - Je ne dirai plus
  - Ma jeunesse
  - Tout le monde est malheureux
  - Pendant que...
  - Une branche à la fenêtre
  - Ton père est parti
  - J'ai mal à la terre
  - La source
  - Entre musique et poésie
  - Mettez vot'parka
  - Jack Monoloy
  - Les gens de mon pays
Retrouvailles 2 (2011)
  - Gens du pays
  - C'est le temps
  - Le Manikoutai
  - La nuit
  - J'ai planté un chêne
  - Zidor le prospecteur
  - Tit-Nor
  - Ah! Que l'hiver
  - Charlie-Jos
  - Maintenant
  - Je n'ai pas cessé de t'aimer
  - Si les bateaux
  - Tombée la nuit
  - Il me reste un pays
Tu peux dormir le temps nous veille - Les berceuses de Gilles Vigneault (2012)
  - Tu peux dormir le temps nous veille
  - Une chanson pomme
  - Berceuse pour Julie
  - J'ai rentré le bois
  - Les mots du dimanche
  - La chanson de l'eau
  - Berceuse pour Mario
  - Les amours, les travaux
  - J'ai pour toi un lac
  - Un enfant dessine un rond
  - Les éléments
  - Les îles de l'enfance
  - Petite berceuse du début de la colonne
  - Chanson du 29 février
Vivre debout (2014)
  - L'inventaire
  - Pour le voyage
  - Tu chantais
  - Coyot' Bill
  - Les silences
  - Berceuse pour une poupée
  - L'isoloir
  - Uranium
  - Le mot
  - La page
  - Partir
  - Vivre debout
  - La leçon d'humilité
  - Dans la dune
  - Petit bilan provisoire
Ma jeunesse (2018)
  - La danse à St. Dilon
  - Ma jeunesse
  - Jack Monoloy
  - J'ai pour toi un lac
  - Jos Montferrand
  - C'est le temps
  - Si les bateaux
  - Ah! Que l'hiver
  - Quand vous mourrez de nos amours
  - La chanson démodée
  - Mon pays
  - Les gens de mon pays
Comme une chanson d'amour (2021)
  - Le dit du feu
  - Monsieur l'air
  - Madame l'eau
  - Dans la dune
  - Langage mon doux pays
  - J'OREILLE, un fait du printemps
  - Le veilleur
  - Madame la lumière
  - La terre
  - Comme une chanson d'amour
  - Romance d'hiver

== Honours ==
Honorary doctorates:

- Trent University (1975)
- Université du Québec à Rimouski (1979)
- Université de Montréal (1981)
- York University (1985)
- Carleton University (2017)

Awards and honours:

- Prix Félix-Leclerc for the song "Mon pays" (1965)
- Governor General's Award for French language poetry or drama (1965)
- Prix de musique Calixa-Lavallée (1966)
- Grand Prix du Disque of the Charles Cros Academy, Paris (in 1970 for Du milieu du pont, in 1984 for two recordings for children: Les Quatre saisons de Piquot and Quelques pas dans l'univers d'Éviola and in 1990)
- Molson Prize (1982)
- Prix Denise-Pelletier conferred by the Quebec government (1983)
- Médaille Jacques-Blanchet (1987)
- Grande médaille de la chanson française-Vermeil medal (1988)
- Governor General's Performing Arts Award - Lifetime Artistic Achievement (1993)
- Canadian Songwriters Hall of Fame (2006)

He is a Grand Officer of the National Order of Quebec (2000), Knight of the Légion d'honneur (1986), and Officier of the Ordre des Arts et des Lettres (1990).

Several cultural institutions and streets in Quebec and France bear the name of Gilles Vigneault:

- The library of the Rimouski Community college (La Bibliothèque Gilles-Vigneault)
- École Gilles-Vigneault (Montreal, Quebec)
- École Gilles-Vigneault de Marseille (Marseille, France)
- Rue Gilles-Vigneault (Blainville, Quebec)
- Rue Gilles-Vigneault (Rimouski, Quebec)
- Rue Gilles-Vigneault (Granby, Quebec)
- Rue Gilles Vigneault (Saint-Charles-Borromée, Québec)

== See also ==
- List of Quebec musicians
- List of poets
- Music of Quebec
- Culture of Quebec
