= Théâtre de Quat'Sous =

Coordinates: 45°30′59″N 73°34′24″W

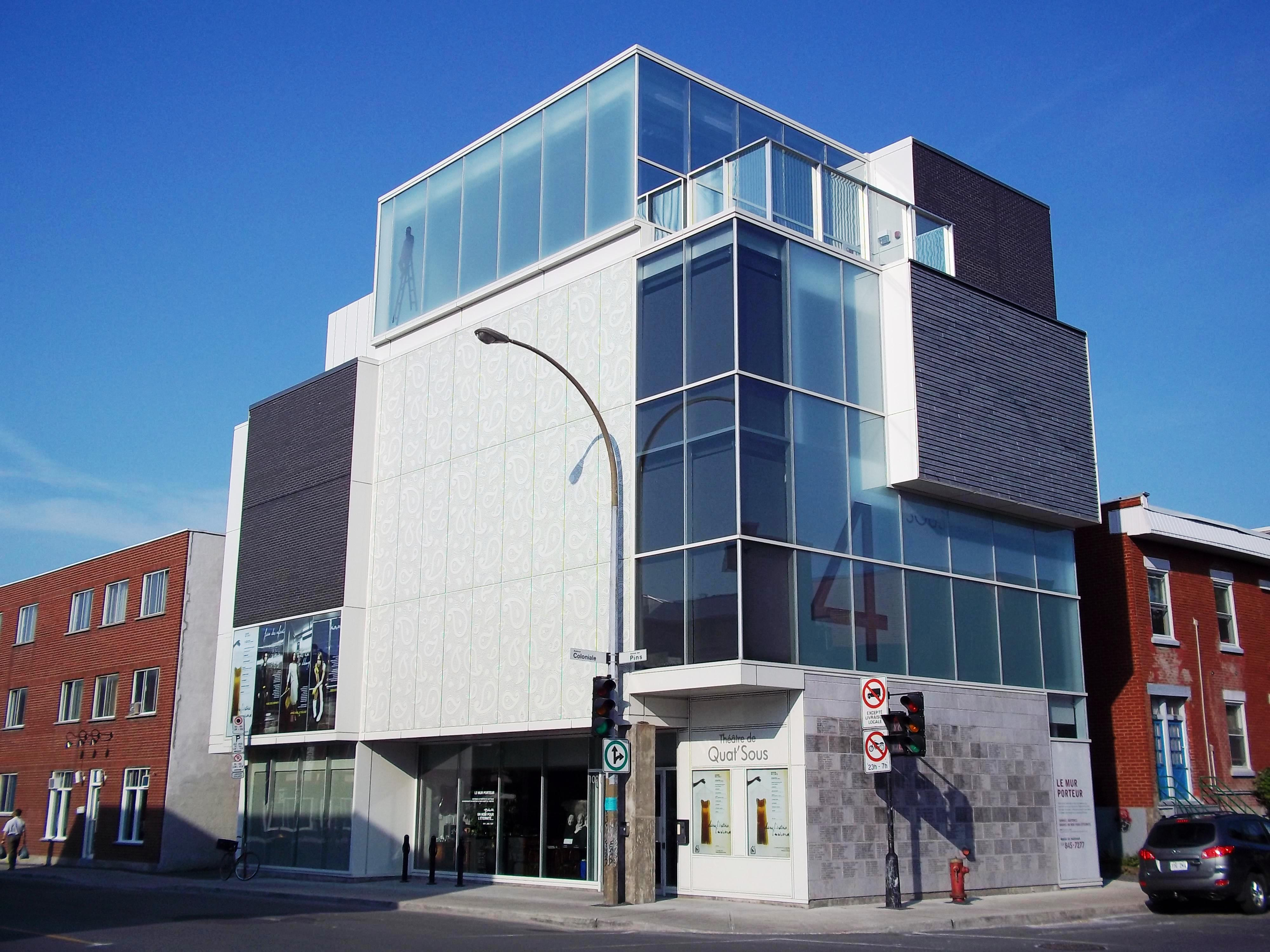
Théâtre de Quat'Sous' new building on Pine Avenue

The Théâtre de Quat'Sous is a Canadian theatre on Pine Avenue in the borough of Le Plateau-Mont-Royal in the city of Montreal, Quebec. Established in 1955, it is the third-oldest theatre company in Montreal after Théâtre du Rideau Vert and Théâtre du Nouveau Monde. The first Canadian play about and starring a drag queen, Hosanna by Michel Tremblay, was first performed at Théâtre de Quat'Sous in 1973.
