= Home Movies: The Great Canadian Film Caper =

- Genre: Documentary
- Created by: Rosalind Farber
- Written by: Rosalind Farber; Wendy Michener
- Presented by: John Gould
- Country of origin: Canada
- Original language: English
- No. of seasons: 1

Production
- Producer: Ross McLean

Original release
- Network: CBC Television
- Release: 17 August – 7 September 1966

Home Movies: The Great Canadian Film Caper is a Canadian television documentary miniseries that aired on CBC Television in 1966.

== Premise ==
John Gould hosted this series, which is about filmmaking in Canada.

== Scheduling ==
The hour-long episodes were broadcast on Wednesdays at 9:30 p.m. from 17 August to 7 September 1966.

== Episodes ==
1. Documentaries were the subject of this first episode, featuring discussion and film excerpts from filmmakers Richard Ballentine (The Most), Donald Brittain (Ladies and Gentlemen... Mr. Leonard Cohen) and Beryl Fox (The Single Woman And The Double Standard).
2. The second episode concerned contemporary Canadian feature cinema, featuring excerpts of À tout prendre (Claude Jutra), The Luck of Ginger Coffey (Irvin Kershner director; Crawley Films company), The Mask (Julian Roffman), Nobody Waved Good-bye (Don Owen), Sweet Substitute (Larry Kent), La Vie heurese de Leopold Z (Gilles Carle) and Winter Kept Us Warm (David Secter).
3. Animation was featured on the third programme with samples of National Film Board of Canada animated films A Is For Architecture (Gerald Budner, Robert Verrall), Christmas Cracker (Norman McLaren, Gerald Potterton, Grant Munro and Jeff Hale) and My Financial Career (Grant Munro, Gerald Potterton). Other animators featured include Carlos Marchiori, Louis de Niverville and Michael Snow.
4. The final episode outlined the history of Canadian cinema from news footage of 1897 to early 20th-century productions to the National Film Board's World War II propaganda works. This was accompanied by excerpts from feature films Carry On Sergeant (1928), The Man From Glengarry and The Viking.
