= 6th Canadian Film Awards =

Canadian film awards ceremony

- Date: May 10, 1954
- Location: Kent Theatre, Montreal, Quebec
- Hosted by: Yousuf Karsh; J. R. White

The 6th Canadian Film Awards were presented on May 10, 1954 to honour achievements in Canadian film.

The judging committee had received two complaints over the previous year: that it granted too many awards relative to the number of submissions, and that its criteria were too focused on films' education value, rather than their appeal to the viewing public. In response, the judges stated that they would assess each film on overall effectiveness, including its realization of purpose and quality of craftsmanship. As to the former issue, the judges agreed to reduce the number of Honourable Mentions and issue Special Mentions for films that had qualities worthy of recognition.

Sixty-eight films were submitted for this year's awards, which were presented by Imperial Oil president J. R. White. The event's Master of Ceremonies was renowned photographer Yousuf Karsh.

== Winners ==
- Film of the Year: The Seasons — Imperial Oil, Christopher Chapman producer and director
- Theatrical Feature Length (Documentary): Not awarded
- Theatrical Short: Farewell Oak Street — National Film Board of Canada, Gordon Burwash producer, Grant McLean director

Honourable Mention: Danish Seining — Atlantic Films and Electronics, Herman Noelle director
Honourable Mention: The Settler (L'Abatis) — National Film Board of Canada, Guy Glover producer, Bernard Devlin and Raymond Garceau directors

- Non-Theatrical, Open: The Seasons — Imperial Oil, Christopher Chapman producer and director

Honourable Mention: Embryonic Development: The Chick — National Film Board of Canada, J.V. Durden producer and director

- Non-Theatrical, Government Sponsored: The World at Your Feet — National Film Board of Canada, Michael Spencer producer, Larry Gosnell director

Honourable Mention: Everybody's Handicapped — Graphic Associates, John Ross producer, Ernest Reid director

- Non-Theatrical, Non-Government Sponsored: Episode in Valleydale — Crawley Films, George Gorman producer and director

Honourable Mention: Polysar — Crawley Films, Peter Cock producer and director
Honourable Mention: The Ring-Necked Pheasant — Wildlife Productions, T. M. Short director

- Special Mentions:

Les Routes de Québec — Service de Ciné-Photographie, Service de ciné-photographie de la province de Québec
Food for Freddy — Crawley Films, Peter Cock producer and director
1953 Grey Cup Final — Davart Productions
Kumak, the Sleepy Hunter — Dunclaren Productions, Alma Duncan and Audrey McLaren producers
Canadian Pattern — Associated Screen Studios, Earl Clark director
Prelude to Kitimat aka Breakthrough at Alcan — Parry Films, Lew Parry producer
Brasil — Crawley Films, Peter Cock producer, F.R. Crawley director
Herring Hunt — National Film Board of Canada, Guy Glover producer, Julian Biggs director
Treasures of the Ukraine — E. F. Attridge, Robert J. Beale Jr. and Frank J. Martyniuk producers
A-Hunting We Will Go — Edmonton Movie and Photo Club

- Amateur: Eight-Fifteen — Toronto Film Society
- Special Award

Gordon Sparling, Associated Screen Studios — "for distinguished service to the art of the film in Canada and to the Canadian film industry".
