= Christmas cracker (disambiguation) =

A Christmas cracker is an entertainment item used in some Christmas celebrations.

Christmas Cracker may also refer to:

- Christmas Cracker (film), a 1963 Canadian short film
- "Christmas Crackers" (Are You Being Served episode), 1975 Christmas special of the British TV sitcom
- "Christmas Crackers" (Only Fools and Horses), 1981 Christmas special of the British TV sitcom
