= The Little Mermaid (1974 film) =

- Newspaper print ad
- Genre: Animation
- Directed by: Peter Sander
- Voices of: Ambrosian Singers
- Narrated by: Richard Chamberlain
- Theme music composer: Ron Goodwin
- Composer: Ron Goodwin
- Country of origin: Canada
- Original language: English

Production
- Producers: Christine Larocque; Gerald Potterton; Murray Shostak
- Running time: 26 minutes
- Production companies: Potterton Productions; Pyramid Films

Original release
- Network: CBS
- Release: 4 February 1974

The Little Mermaid is an animated short film adaptation of the fairy tale by Hans Christian Andersen. The film was produced in 1973 by the Canadian-based Potterton Productions, Pyramid Films and Reader's Digest. It is narrated by Richard Chamberlain, with vocals provided by the Ambrosian Singers. The work is notable for its close faithfulness to Andersen’s original text, including the heroine’s pursuit of an immortal soul and the story's original bittersweet ending.

The film premiered in the United States on CBS on February 4, 1974, and in Canada on CTV on December 3 of the same year. It later competed at the 1976 Giffoni Film Festival without receiving any awards.

== Plot ==
A young mermaid princess longs to experience life in the human world. After rescuing a prince from a shipwreck and falling in love with him, she makes a pact with a sea witch, sacrificing her voice in exchange for human legs so she can try to win his heart.

Though she gains the opportunity to live among humans, the prince ultimately marries another princess. Refusing to harm him to save herself, she chooses self-sacrifice and is transformed into a daughter of the air, gaining the hope of an immortal soul.

== Home media ==
The film was released on VHS by Reader's Digest in 1985, paired with The Happy Prince, and by Random House in 1987. In the UK, it was issued on VHS by Diplomat Video alongside The Selfish Giant and The Happy Prince.
