= Christopher Chapman =

Canadian film director (1927–2015)

- Born: January 24, 1927; Toronto, Ontario, Canada
- Died: October 24, 2015 (aged 88); Uxbridge, Ontario, Canada
- Occupation: Film director
- Years active: 1954–1976

Christopher Chapman CM RCA (January 24, 1927 – October 24, 2015) was a Canadian film writer, director, editor and cinematographer. Best known for his award-winning 1967 short film A Place to Stand, he also pioneered the multi-dynamic image technique used in films and television shows.

== Personal life ==
Chapman was born in Toronto, shortly after midnight on January 24, 1927, and just minutes after his twin brother Francis. Christopher and his twin had four elder siblings, Philippa, Howard, Robert, and Sally. Another brother, Julian, died in infancy. They were children of distinguished architect Alfred Hirschfelder Chapman (of Chapman and Oxley) and concert pianist Doris Chapman.

In the 1950s, Christopher spent a year in England designing cars for the Ford Motor Company before returning to Canada and becoming a filmmaker.

Chapman was married to Barbara-Glen Chapman (née Kennedy), his wife of 44 years. He died at the age of 88 on October 24, 2015, at his residence in ReachView Village, a long-term care facility in Uxbridge, Ontario. The Chapmans had one son, Julian, who is a former Deputy Commander of 4th Canadian Division, Canadian Army Brigadier General.

== Career ==
Over his career, Chapman made approximately 40 films for television, the National Film Board of Canada, theatrical release, tourism organizations, science centres, and international expositions. Chapman's first film, The Seasons, won the Canadian Film Award (CFA) for Film of the Year in 1954.

In 1965 Christopher and Francis Chapman jointly won the Canadian Film Award for Best Colour Cinematography at the 17th Canadian Film Awards for Expedition Bluenose.

Another of his films to win the CFA Film of Year was his 1967 short, A Place to Stand, which also received two Academy Award nominations in 1968, winning the one for Best Live-Action Short. The film, commissioned by the Government of Ontario, featured Chapman's innovative multi-dynamic image technique (or 'the Brady Bunch effect'), wherein moving panes of moving images are used within the single context of the screen. Over a year of filming, Chapman shot 70 kilometres (43 miles) of film, which he then edited into 18 minutes, though the images moving across the screen were the equivalent of an hour and three-quarters of film. The process exhausted Chapman and he was still unsure of using it until its first screening occurred: "There were a couple of stenographers, who were eating their lunch watching the screening, and they were agog," Chapman said. "But I wanted to run. I was exhausted and thought it was a failure, but a chap grabbed me as I was going out the door. He'd been standing at the back of the screening room and said he was blown away by it. It was Steve McQueen."

In 1968, McQueen starred in The Thomas Crown Affair, directed by Norman Jewison, a film that used Chapman's split-screen technique. Jewison added the multiple-image sequences into the film after seeing A Place to Stand. Over the years since, many films and television series have used the technique, with the most recent known to be the American series 24, which, by using the technique, documented the simultaneous actions of its characters.

In 1970, Chapman directed a film for the Hudson’s Bay Company, called Impressions, as part of HBC's 300th anniversary celebrations. Impressions, another film of Chapman’s to use his multiple-dynamic technique, follows the HBC's 300-year history using both historic and modern images: iconic images of the fur trade are paired with modern department stores; scenes of farming are shown with oil production are seen, and so on.

In 1984, Francis and Christopher Chapman collaborated on a three-dimensional nature film for the nascent Science North.

=== Filmography ===
| Year | Film | Type | Awards and nominations |
|---|---|---|---|
| 1954 | The Seasons | Documentary short | Won: Film of the Year (6th Canadian Film Awards) |
| 1963 | Lewis Mumford on the City: Part 1: The City - Heaven and Hell; Part 2: The City - Cars or People?; Part 3: The City and Its Region | Documentary short | |
| 1964 | The Persistent Seed | Documentary short | |
| 1964 | Magic Molecule | Documentary short | |
| 1964 | The Enduring Wilderness | Promotional film | Produced for the National Parks Branch by the National Film Board. Chapman credited as "Photographer". |
| 1967 | A Place to Stand | Documentary short | Won: Film of the Year (20th Canadian Film Awards) Won: Best Live Action Short Subject (40th Academy Awards) Nominated: Best Documentary Short Subject (40th Academy Awards) Nominated: Best Short Film (Chicago International Film Festival) |
| 1970 | Impressions | Promotional film | |
| 1976 | A Sense of Humus | Documentary short | |
| 1981 | Kelly | Narrative feature | |

== Honors ==
In addition to his film honors, Chapman was appointed a member of the Order of Canada in 1987 and awarded a Doctor of Laws by Ryerson University in 2000. Chapman served as president of both the Royal Canadian Academy of Arts and the Directors Guild of Canada. He was also a member of The Arts and Letters Club of Toronto.
