= Multi-dynamic image technique =

Multi-dynamic image technique is a name given by its Canadian creator Christopher Chapman (January 24, 1927 – October 24, 2015) to a film innovation which shows several images shifting simultaneously on right-angled panes within the overall image, with these panes variously containing a single image or forming part of an image completed by one or a number of other panes. The process was first used in his film A Place to Stand, produced for the Ontario pavilion at Expo 67, held in Montreal.

== Background ==
The 1956 Associated British-Pathe fantasy/science-fiction release The Door in the Wall (dir. Glenn Alvey, screenplay by Alvey and H. G. Wells) can be seen as a primitive forerunner of Chapman's technique. Using what it announced as "The Dynamic Frame – in which the shape and size of the picture change according to the dramatic needs of the story", the film displayed, however, neither movement of image panels nor multiplicity or division of images. Chapman felt "it was clear that its failure was creative, not technical" and decided against advice to employ this matting technique when making a film for the Telephone Association Pavilion at Expo 67.

Scene from Christopher Chapman's A Place to Stand (1967) premiering the multi-dynamic image technique

Chapman initially had great difficulties with the technical aspects of his expanded concept for A Place to Stand and almost gave up on the idea as a result; in his own words, he "had nothing to read about how to do it." Working from 350 pages of notes, he was limited to editing on a two-picture-head moviola, so that only two images could be viewed simultaneously; he "could never 'see' the film develop".

Shots were viewed "with an eye to vertical frames and horizontal frames, odd frames, small frames and large frames". It was important to also shoot material that would be of limited interest, so as not to confuse the viewer with too many visual stimuli. Editing required close attention to where the various images would direct the viewer's gaze.

The technique as employed in A Place to Stand displayed as many as 15 images at a time. In this way, the under-18-minute film contained an actual hour and a half of footage. The dimensions of the original screen used were 66 feet or 20.12 m (wide) by 30 feet or 9.14 m (high). Unlike other multi-image films, it did not require special equipment or a special theatre.

== Response ==
The film and its innovative technique enjoyed great immediate popularity. It was seen by an estimated two million at Expo 67 and was later distributed to theatres, ultimately reaching an audience of an estimated 100 million in North America and Europe.

A Place to Stand was nominated in two categories at the 1967 40th Academy Awards presented on April 10, 1968, Best Documentary Short Subject and Best Live Action Short Subject, winning in the latter. It also won Chapman the Canadian Film Award (later to become the Genie Awards) for Film of the Year (and additionally won for Best Non-Feature Sound-Editing). Chapman himself was ultimately appointed to the Order of Canada in 1987.

== Influence ==
Scene from The Thomas Crown Affair (1968) demonstrating one example of the multi-dynamic image technique

Prints of Chapman's film were purchased for viewing by executives, producers and directors by almost all of the major studios in Hollywood. The technique has inspired many films and television series, most notably Norman Jewison's 1968 film The Thomas Crown Affair. Steve McQueen, star of the film, was on hand for the premiere screening of A Place to Stand at the Todd-AO studios in Hollywood, and personally told an unsure Chapman (who "thought it was a failure") that he was highly impressed; the following year, Norman Jewison had incorporated the technique into the film, inserting the scenes into the already finished product. (Chapman later dissuaded a "very disappointed" McQueen from using the technique in his 1971 vehicle Le Mans, claiming "it was much too big a film, with too many writers; it wouldn't work that way". He has stated that "many filmmakers then adopted multi-dynamic image even though few understood it".)

The Boston Strangler, also from 1968 (director Richard Fleischer), has several long multi-frame sequences clearly based on Chapman's original in terms of arrangement and rhythm; here, however, the panes remain static and do not show identical images in simultaneous multiplicity. Fleischer used the technique again, this time with subdivided images and moving panes closer to Chapman's original, in the title sequence to his 1973 film Soylent Green.

Chapman's innovation found quick favour in late 1960s and 1970s television, notably in title sequences. Mannix, Barnaby Jones, Kojak, Medical Center, The Odd Couple, Dallas, Phyllis, Lancelot Link, Me and the Chimp, The Brady Bunch and The Bob Newhart Show (beginning with the fifth season in 1976–77) are all examples of the technique being used in opening credits to some extent, whether by combining multiple panes as in A Place to Stand or overlaying panes on full-screen images (as with The Bob Newhart Show). Indeed, the multi-dynamic image technique has been referred to in the press as the "Brady Bunch effect". The more contemporary U.S. action drama TV series 24 as well as the Canadian documentary series Final 24 both also use the technique.

More broadly, the multi-dynamic image technique has been credited with laying the groundwork for the IMAX format.

== See also ==
- Multi-image – Obsolete multimedia presentation format
- Split screen (film and video production) – Filmmaking technique
- Hyperlink cinema – Multilinear filmmaking style
