= McQueen (TV series) =

- Genre: Drama
- Created by: George Salverson
- Written by: Bryan Barney; John Fisher; Jack Gray; Donald Jack; Leslie MacFarlane; Ian Ross; George Salverson
- Directed by: René Bonnière; Peter Carter; Kirk Jones
- Country of origin: Canada
- Original language: English
- No. of seasons: 1

Production
- Executive producer: Ronald Weyman

Original release
- Network: CBC Television
- Release: 23 September 1969 – 18 September 1970

McQueen is a Canadian drama television series that aired on CBC Television from 1969 to 1970.

== Premise ==
The plot features newspaper columnist McQueen (Ted Follows) whose "The Actioneer" feature exposes fraud artists and dubious businesses. He is assisted by Denise (Daphne Gibson) and Natasha (Jan Goldin).

The pilot episode, "There's a Car Upside-Down on My Lawn", concerns the disposition of an abandoned vehicle. The episode won two Canadian Film Awards in 1969, for Best Director (Francis Chapman) and Best Actress in a Non-Feature (Josephine Barrington).

Jenny (Margot Kidder) was featured in two episodes as an employee of McQueen's newspaper. In one episode, she helps expose a scam at a talent agency, while in the other she seeks McQueen's help for a Vietnam War draft evader she is dating.

The series was inspired by Frank Drea's Action Line column of the Toronto Telegram, whose newsroom was used to film scenes for the series.

Guest actors during the series included Ruth Springford, Austin Willis, Henry Ramer and Louis Zorich.

== Scheduling ==
McQueen was broadcast on Tuesdays at 9:00 p.m. (Eastern) from 23 September 1969 until 18 September 1970. The show was not well-received; by January, the newly installed head of CBC Entertainment was quoted in the Toronto Star as saying: "Everybody knows it's a failure now, but unfortunately we're stuck with it for the rest of the season."

=== Episodes ===
No.	Title	Directed by	Written by	Original release date
1	"You'll Never Be Lonely"	Unknown	Unknown	23 September 1969
McQueen rescues a victim from a social club with an outrageous contract, but discovers that some other members don't want to be rescued.
2	"Mr. Flim-Flam"	Unknown	Unknown	30 September 1969
McQueen confronts a discount vacuum salesman, whose $10 vacuums are worthless.
3	"Faith Healer"	Unknown	Unknown	7 October 1969
McQueen sets out to expose a faith healer as a confidence trickster, but the reality is more complex.
4	"How Could You Use A Poor Maiden So?"	Unknown	Unknown	14 October 1969
A North Bay motel owner asks McQueen to write about an expensive cigarette lighter left behind in a room -- which leads to a revelation of infidelity.
5	"All The World's A Stage"	Unknown	Unknown	21 October 1969
McQueen goes up against an acting agency that rakes in money from would-be actors, but doesn't deliver employment.
6	"The Elevator"	Unknown	Unknown	28 October 1969
McQueen fights on behalf of tenants who are facing an arbitrary and unreasonable building manager.
7	"Brotherly Love"	Unknown	Unknown	4 November 1969
McQueen and Denise try to outwit a couple of con artists raising money for a non-existent orphanage.
8	"There's A Car Upside-Down On My Lawn"	Unknown	Unknown	11 November 1969
McQueen struggles with one bureaucratic nightmare after another, as he tries to help a couple get rid of an abandoned car on their property.
9	"Home Is Where The Draft Ain't"	Unknown	Unknown	18 November 1969
A young woman in McQueen's office is in love with a draft dodger, working in Canada illegally.
10	"Vanity, Vanity"	Unknown	Unknown	25 November 1969
A would-be novelist gets suckered into investing his life savings into a vanity publishing scam.
11	"The Man With The Green Head"	Unknown	Unknown	2 December 1969
McQueen tries to get a refund for a man who fell for a phony hair restoration scheme.
12	"The Book"	Unknown	Unknown	9 December 1969
McQueen and Denise find a valuable rare book donated to a newspaper-sponsored book drive.
13	"T Is For Teacher"	Unknown	Unknown	16 December 1969
McQueen champions the reinstatement of a teacher fired for her political beliefs.
14	"When You Have Lived Too Long"	Unknown	Unknown	23 December 1969
McQueen tries to secure a job for a lonely 70-year-old.
15	"A Small Deposit"	Unknown	Unknown	30 December 1969
McQueen goes undercover to get a young woman her deposit back on some unwanted furniture.
16	"The Skirt"	Unknown	Unknown	6 January 1970
McQueen faces off against a teacher who has banned skirts and sideburns in his class.
17	"The Delightful Monster"	Unknown	Unknown	13 January 1970
A woman begs McQueen to help her get a passport, which the authorities have denied her.
18	"Walk, Don't Run"	Unknown	Unknown	27 January 1970
McQueen defends a young man mistakenly arrested for shoplifting.
19	"Jerry and Jan"	Unknown	Unknown	3 February 1970
McQueen is called on to intervene when a couple of Nova Scotia drifters stay with relatives for weeks, running up outrageous bills.
20	"Carnival"	Unknown	Unknown	10 February 1970
McQueen helps a woman get a refund on a cancelled flight to Jamaica, but discovers others may be in danger of getting ripped off.
21	"Five Hectic Hours"	Unknown	Unknown	17 February 1970
McQueen and Denise try to help a young couple get married.
22	"Bombs Don't Need A Fuse"	Unknown	Unknown	24 February 1970
McQueen goes after used-car dealers selling "bombs" -- cars they know to have serious, life-threatening defects.
23	"The Last Of The Medicine Man"	Unknown	Unknown	10 March 1970
McQueen and Denise go after an old-fashioned pitchman, selling worthless bric-a-brac at wildly inflated prices.
24	"Who Only Stand And Wait"	Unknown	Unknown	17 March 1970
McQueen becomes involved with two lonely people (an artist and a poet) who may be perfect for each other.
25	"Emma Doesn't Live Here Anymore"	Unknown	Unknown	24 March 1970
McQueen investigates the disappearance of an elderly woman from her home. With Cathleen Nesbitt.
26	"Rewrite Column Four"	Unknown	Unknown	31 March 1970
A friend on a rival newspaper is fired, and McQueen thinks it night be because the publisher is trying to cover up a scandal about an unsafe building.
