= Multi-image =

Obsolete multimedia presentation format

Multi-image is the now largely obsolete practice and business of using 35mm slides (diapositives) projected by single or multiple slide projectors onto one or more screens in synchronization with an audio voice-over or music track. Multi-image productions are also known as multi-image slide presentations, slide shows and diaporamas and are a specific form of multimedia or audio-visual production.

Soft-edge masking and overlap for projected panoramas.

One of the hallmarks of multi-image was the use of the wide screen panorama. Precisely overlapping slides were placed in slide mounts with soft-edge density masks; when the resulting images were projected, the images would blend seamlessly on the screen to create the panorama. By cutting and dissolving between images in the projectors, animation effects were created in the panorama format.

The term multi-image is sometimes used to describe digital photo image computer programs that combine or change images on-screen, for photo montages, and image stitching.

== Description ==
Multi-image presentations were a unique form of communication to audiences of various sizes, to meet a variety of communication and entertainment needs. The use of projected photographic images such as lantern slides for entertainment and instruction dates to the mid-1800s. Others, such as L. Frank Baum had a traveling show (1908) that included slides, film, and actors describing the Land of Oz. Throughout the years improvements in technology took place and applications for multi-image continued to expand. During the 1960s, automated synchronized audio and slides modules became more common and found use in instructional environments.

In general, multi-image can be defined as being:

- Based largely on analog production tools and technologies including art and audio production and film-based photography. 35mm slide film has high resolution and color range and are based on grain and dye clouds rather than on a fixed raster pattern, which when projected often is perceived as being more realistic, uniform, and detailed than digital images. Line density for 35mm film was up to 3850 lines per inch, which at the time no video projection technology could match.
- Multi-disciplinary in terms of the types of skills required to create and stage multi-image presentations.
- Venue driven; multi-image presentations had specific requirements for the equipment and spaces they were intended for and presented in.

== Multi-image business ==
Multi-image as a business thrived during the 1970s and 1980s. Multi-image presentations ranged from single projector shows run by projector-viewer to large events for business meetings and conventions where multiple shows would be presented and often were rear-projected by 24 or more projectors.

Creating and presenting multi-image productions involved a relatively large number of specialized skills, equipment, and facilities to produce. During the height of multi-image, a number of types of businesses were directly engaged in the industry which employed thousands of specialists that ranged from producers and designers, writers, artists, typesetters, photographers, photo lab technicians, audio technicians, programmers, staging specialists as well as others associated with these disciplines.

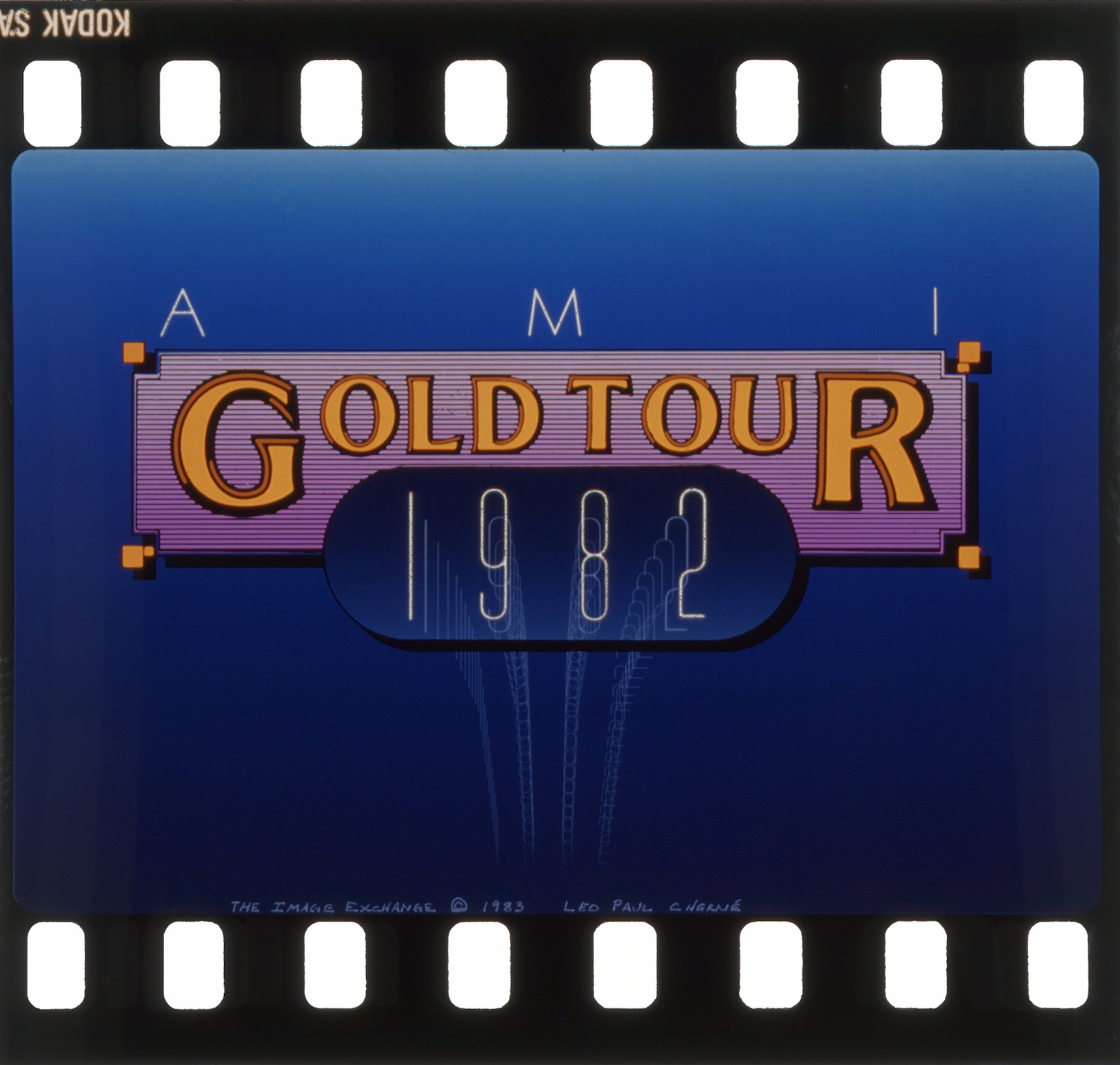
AMI Gold Tour promotion.

A professional organization, the Association for Multi-image International (AMI), was created and had numerous active chapters around the world. The AMI held an annual convention and multi-image competition. Local chapters of AMI in various cities also held regional competitions.

An entire industry grew around supplying the tools and equipment needed to supply and support multi-image production.

- Corporations who manufactured and sold basic equipment and materials used in the production of multi-image, such as 35mm slide projectors, film, slide mounts, soft-edge masks and other items. The list of suppliers for the multi-image industry was extensive with a number of companies attaining international importance for the products they produced, including Eastman Kodak, Wess Slide Mounts, Chief Manufacturing, Navitar and Schneider Optics.
- Manufacturers of highly specialized multi-image equipment such as optical slide cameras and slide projector programming hardware. Precise camera systems were developed for the multi-image market featuring pin-registered film movements capable of making multiple exposures, controlled backlit color light sources, motorized multi-axis compounds for precise positioning of artwork, and long-roll film loads. Slide projector programming computers and dissolve equipment and software was developed to synchronize the slides with the audio by providing precise time control over slide tray positioning and lamp fade rates needed to create multi-image animation. Programmer and camera manufacturers included Audio Visual Labs, Electrosonic, Clearlight Inc. Spindler & Sauppe, Marron Carrel and Forox.
- Companies who specialized in one or more of the general disciplines used in the production of multi-image and offered multi-image as a service; these ranged from companies or individuals such as photographers, slide services and photo labs to full production multi-image service companies, staging companies, and event production and communications companies. Additionally, there were individual contractors who served as producers, directors, and designers or provided other talents needed to create multi-image presentations.

Driven by changes in technology and by economic considerations, multi-image has been replaced by video presentations and by readily available computer based technologies such as laptop computers running PowerPoint and projecting through digital projectors. Visual presentation and photo and graphics editing software programs have allowed a wider range of communicators quick, flexible, and easy access to the tools and technologies needed to create presentations. Digital photography has reduced the need for laboratory services and complex equipment. The expansion and ease of use of desktop computing brought a close to the multi-image industry.

== Multi-image production technologies ==
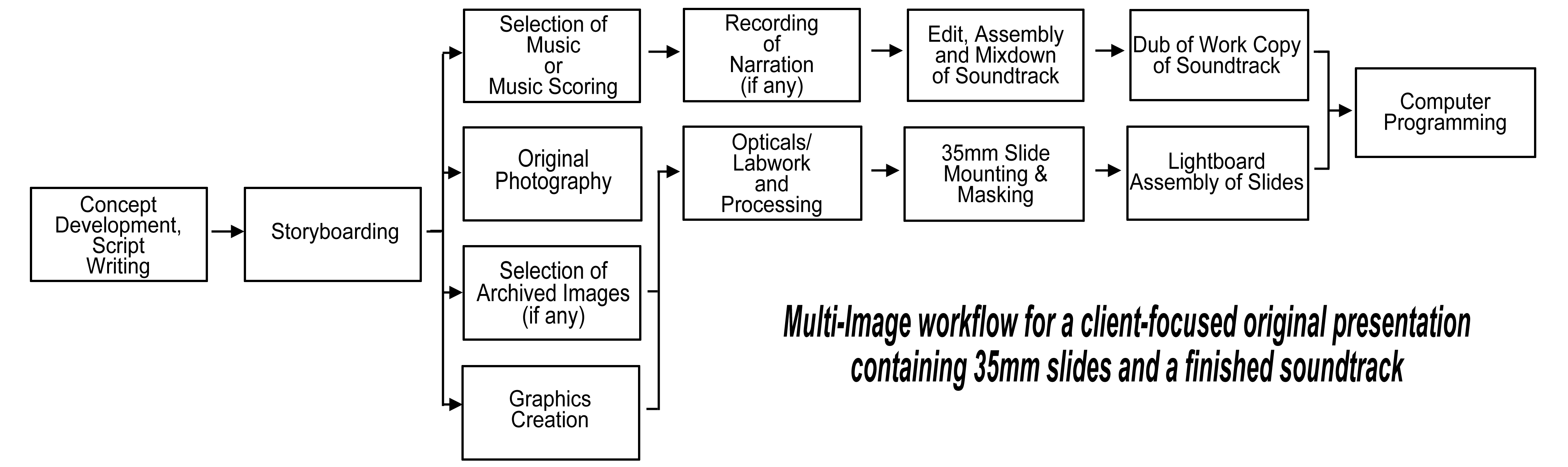
Typical workflow for multi-image production

The art and business of multi-image drew from many older existing technologies. When a multi-image project was initiated, various overall management roles were required to provide direction, planning, and project management. These roles generally involved the activities similar to those found in other media industries, such as creative, visual, and technical directors, producers, production managers, and writers.

Often individuals with the various production skills would fill these roles as well as performing their production roles. Multi-image productions in general were deadline driven and it was common that the production process would be non-linear, allowing for multiple activities to take place with overlapping roles.

=== Art and multi-image design ===
The visual quality of a presentation was based on using photographs and artwork created for use in the presentation as source material. 35mm slides could be used directly as they were originally taken, or re-photographed by design. Often the original photographs were masked or duplicated for positioning and sizing. In some instances, 35mm cameras modified for pin-registration were used to create animated sequences. The registered 35mm format was generally standard but square and masked images were developed and supported by slide mount manufacturers like Wess Mounts.

Through the use of multiple projectors set up to project onto a defined screen area, projected images could be designed as animations. Typical programmable multi-image animation effects included filmic effects; cuts, dissolves, fades; fading from one photograph or graphic to another at different rates and intensities, and the development of computer-controlled 'dissolve units' by multi image equipment developers was key to the unique 'live' aesthetic of multi image productions, progressively building images and text to form a completed statement, inserting images or graphics into frames or windows on screen, step by step movement of images across the screen area, and superimposing text or images into a background. The visual effects were electronically synchronized to precise recorded soundtracks of music, sound effects, and voice, based on the capabilities and limitations of the slide projectors and dissolve units and computer controller. Multi Image systems equipment were developed by Arion, Audio Visual Laboratories, Clear Light, Dataton, Electronics, Multivision, and Spindler and Sauppé.

Artwork produced for multi-image presentations in general was based on one of two forms of top-lit reflective copy artwork:

1. Materials that were produced and copied as flat art directly to slides to be used in the production, or
2. Color- or image-separated and layered photomechanical art that would be copied to high-contrast masks which were then used to create slides. This second process was called optical slide printing and was based on many of the basic principles from photomechanical prepress art used in offset printing, silk-screen printing, and cel animation.

Flat art was created by using a variety of standard graphic illustration techniques, using pen and ink, airbrush, paints, from clip art, colored paper, transfer lettering such as Letraset, and by copying from existing materials on a copy stand or on optical slide camera. Cel art, such as found in cel animation, was also used.

Art used in optical slide printing was based on the use of high-contrast photomechanical materials such as photomechanical transfers, black and white type, rubylith and other materials. Phototypesetting was done by a variety of means including the Visual Graphics Corporation PhotoTypositor and the Compugraphic EditWriter at companies that specialized in providing typography. When making artwork for multi-image presentations, photographs, transparencies, and film images or continuous tone film or airbrushed masks could also be used as part of the camera-ready artwork.

The color or image separated layers of artwork were pin-registered using a variety of standard copystand/animationstand pin systems techniques. including 1/4-inch, Oxberry, and Acme. The artwork was created on a light table or animation disc to provide back lighting.

Often the art was created based on a grid system. A copy of the optical slide camera grid or reticle was used to align the artwork elements. The use of the grid for alignment could be used to accurately position images and art elements throughout the process from the creation of the artwork to the final projected images. This process also allowed layers of the artwork to be interchangeable from slide to slide, images or graphic elements could be carefully placed on the screen relative to other images, and for combining parts of images or graphics by separate slides as in an animated sequence.

=== Audio production ===
The audio track of a multi-image show provided a framework for the timing of the presentation and for the sequencing and animations of the slides. These were produced generally on 1/4-inch audio tape on multi-track tape recorders such as models by Crown, Fostex, Otari, Sony, Tascam and TEAC, which allowed for having two tracks or channels for stereo sound and one for the synchronization or click track which was used to encode and playback the signals for the dissolve units.

The synchronization signals could be as simple as multiple pulse tones, each with a unique corresponding command, to digital telemetry, directly addressing a programming computer such as an AVL ShowPro V or a Spindler & Sauppe Director 24Z. As time and technology progressed, timecode was used, with the programming computer chasing the timecoded audio tape and firing commands from a managed list of cues.

The audio and synchronization tracks were normally separated by a blank track (or "guard track") to prevent any audible spill of the synchronization cues into audio playback. Sometimes the guard track would be a third audio channel, such as sound effects or mix-minus narration, to permit flexibility of mixing on-site. In such situations, the tape might be processed with Dolby or dBx noise reduction to help prevent audible spill from the synchronization track.

In early productions, audio editing of the music or voice-over was done manually to create a scratch track, usually with a cutting block and tape. Once the audio edits were completed, the final version would be copied onto another tape; either to 1/4 inch, cassette or other format so that there tape used to run the presentation would be a fresh uncut tape.

Multi-Image audio tracks could be any combination of voice and music and were generally created in audio or recording studios or were created in-house. Before the advent of MIDI (Musical Instrument Digital Interface) devices and software, music was frequently sourced from popular music for which licensing rights would be obtained, from royalty-free music found on LP records, or created by musicians in a studio. With MIDI, the audio portion of the productions could be designed around the requirements of the project, made quickly, and allowed for more complex media integrations.

=== Printing with light ===
Completed artwork was copied under top lights on a pin-registered camera on a high contrast film such as Kodaline or Kodalith to create 35mm mattes used in the optical slide printing process. Other than using camera original photos, slides used for presentation were made on a slide duplication, slide animation, or rostrum camera designed for slide production. The most commonly used slide camera stands were Forox, Marron Carrel (later Maron), and Sickles (later Mangum Sickles).

When needed, pin-registered positive mattes known as countermattes were made by contact printing from the mattes. When a set of mattes and countermates were completed, the optical slide camera was used to assemble the separate images onto a single frame of film by making multiple exposures through the mattes. Accuracy in positioning the separate elements of the slide is made possible by the film sprockets, which were also used to position the finished color slides and masks in the slide mounts.

Maron 1600 camera table, large format 12-field compound, and colorhead.

Copy cameras and optical slide cameras usually had motorized movement of the camera on the column toward and away from the table to allow for resizing the image on the camera on the Z-axis.

Fully functional optical slide cameras had compounds for positioning both artwork and the mattes relative to the lens and camera head. A compound could move left to right (horizontal) X-axis and top to bottom (vertical) Y-axis movement as well as rotate (theta-axis). Compounds were often motorized with micro-stepping motors to allow for smooth programmable and repeatable positioning. Higher end optical slide cameras had the ability to create and save programs.

Light sources for copying artwork generally were quartz halogen lights. Backlighting was generally provided by the use a darkroom photographic enlarger colorhead modified for use with the camera. This form of controlled light provide colored light balanced for the color sensitivity of the film used and provided color light for the separate exposures that are made through the mattes.

The optical slide camera could be used to create a number of types of slides and special effects commonly used in multi-image presentations:

- Duplicates: copies of transparencies
- Copy slides: slides made by top-light copying of artwork or illustrations
- Title burns: made by making multiple exposures through a series of mattes, such as text slides
- Color on color slides: Similar to burn slides but with a color background, often requiring countermattes
- Step and repeat: Using a compound, making a series of exposures where the compound is moved between each exposure
- Movements: long exposures made from a backlit matte, the shutter is open while the compound and the camera move the matte creating a streaking effect
- Glow effects: using a light diffusing material while exposing the backlight through a matte to create soft edges around the image on the matte
- Filter effects: using color, star and other types of camera filters for special effects
- Image effects: by either manipulating the mattes and countermattes of by positioning transparencies while duplicating them; posterizations, inserts, split frames, and panoramas
- Camera effects: Some optical slide cameras have the capabilities for in-camera mattes, bi-packing, and rotoscoping

Slides created by these methods and combinations of these methods were made to align and animate when projected, creating what was considered the visual multi-image experience.

==== Film processing ====
Film processing requires specific facilities, equipment, and skill needed to maintain consistent results. Film processors for developing transparency film require maintaining processing control which was based on good practices in chemical mixing and storage, accurate time, temperature and agitation during the process and the use of control strips. Control strips were run with the film and read on a densitometer to determine their variation from a standard so that corrections could be made

==== Computer graphics ====
The use of computer graphics replaced much of the manual activity in creating the artwork and converting the art into slides. Service bureaus offering production work from large workstations such as Dicomed and Genigraphics dominated larger markets. Smaller producers using desktop software such as Photoshop, Persuasion, Harvard Graphics and PowerPoint allowed many slide producers to quickly create slides which were imaged on film recorders such as Management Graphics, Lasergraphics, Polaroid, Celco, and CCG.

=== Assembly ===
Completed slides were mounted into pin-registered slide mounts. Three or more pieces of film could be mounted into a slide mount which allowed slides to contain the image film chip and masks to allow for inserting and over-projecting. Slides were edited and arranged for programming on light tables.

In order for all the slides to align properly on the screen, a set of alignment slides were also created for the show according to the show's screen configuration. These slides were most often placed in the 80 slot of all the trays. Before programming or staging can commence, all the projectors have to be aligned to this alignment slide grid.

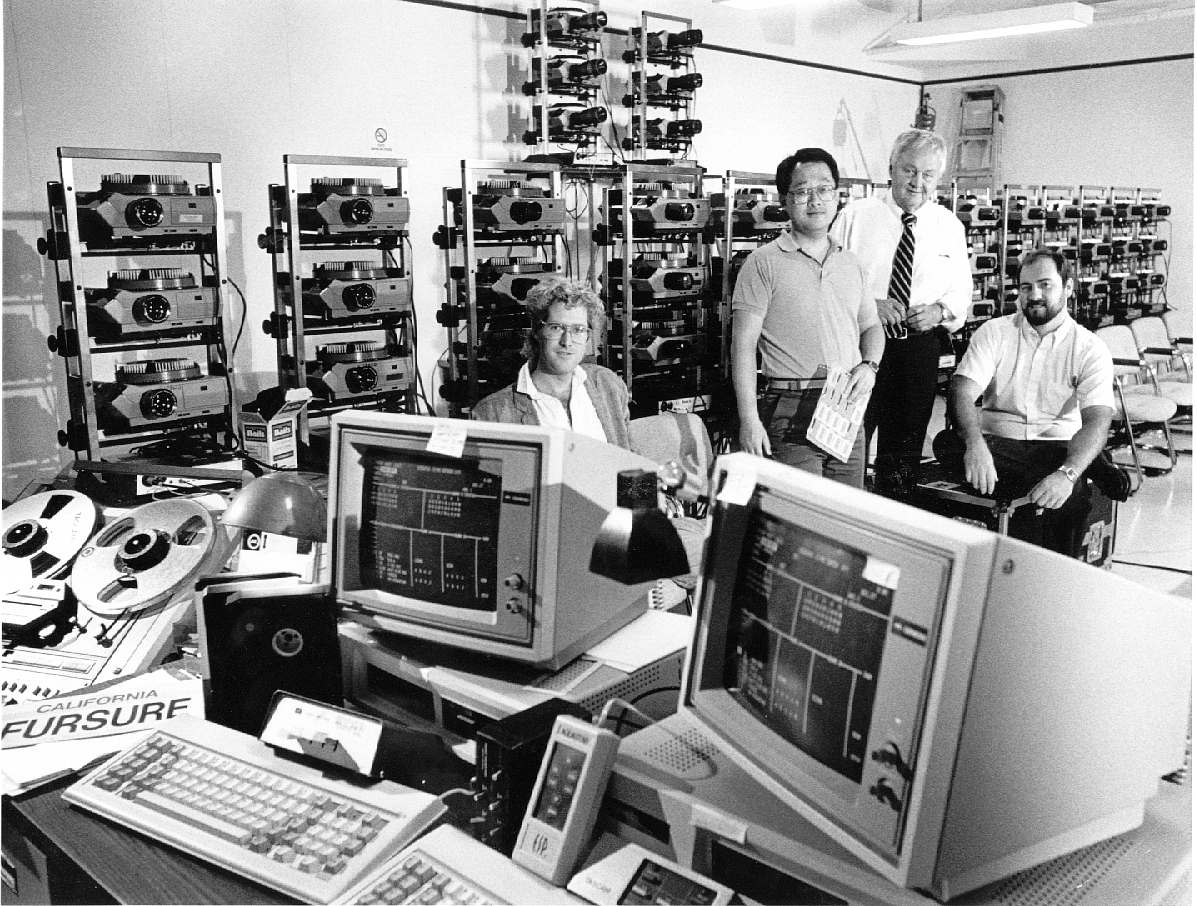
Multi-image programming setup for the 1988 Ford Division New Car Announcement Show. AVL Eagle Genesis computers in foreground.

Slides were then placed into assigned trays and tray slots in a specific order, according to a programming script. The programming script was created by the programmer by listening to the sound track, narration script (if there was narrative) and according to the design storyboard. The programmer would note on the storyboard where each slide(s) would appear on the screen(s) at each part of the track by noting the slide's tray and tray slot position. Imagine having hundreds (or more) of slides in three to thirty or more projectors and not having a programming script to know the tray and tray slot position of each slide. With these tools, the programmer would then place the trays on the corresponding projectors and listen to the sound track and program the designed action for each slide to create a final show. Depending on the number of projectors, slides and length of the show, the programming process could take from a few hours to days, weeks and sometimes months to complete. Often with changes and modifications to the script, design, new images, graphics and hence, revised programming.

=== Programming ===
Programming of a multi-projector multi-image show was generally done on one of several systems such as Arion, Audio-Visual Laboratories (AVL), Electrosonic, Clearlight, Dataton, UAV, Spindler-Sauppe and Multivision. The programming itself was done on a system that allowed for input by the programmer and dissolve units which were attached to the projectors and controlled the functions of the projectors based on the programming instructions. Programming could also be used to control room lights, film projectors, rewind of the audio tape and resetting of the projectors, and to trigger other effects that might be used in the presentation, such as a strobe light.

There were two basic slide projector programming controls: a set of instructions to position the slide in the projector and a set of instructions for the slide projector lamp. These controls would be used to define the cues. The cues would often designate an action for more than one projector such as with a dissolve between two slides which would require simultaneously fading up on one lamp and fading down another lamp. Similar commands were used to control motion-picture projectors, as well as auxiliary controls for lighting and effects, etc.

Slide tray	AVL "Procall": Multi-image programming timing based on slide positioning
Forward	Lifts the current slide from the projector gate into the slide tray, rotates the tray one position and drops the next slide into the gate. During this process a shutter at the slide gate in the projector is used prevent projecting while the lamp remains lit. The average time to cycle from slide to slide varies from 0.9 to 1.5 seconds, depending on the projector.
No movement	The slide projector is instructed to make no tray move during a cue or series of cues. On AVL systems, this is termed an "alt", and embedded into a lamp command.
Reverse	Lifts the current slide from the projector gate into the slide tray, rotates the tray one position in reverse and drops the previous slide into the gate. During the cycle the shutter will close and open in the same manner as a forward movement.
Use of shutter	The slide projector shutter can be controlled to block light without controlling voltage to the lamp. The shutter cycle time varies from projector to projector, averaging at about 0.2 seconds to cycle from open to closed.

Projector Lamp	AVL "Procall": Multi-image programming effects based on lamp intensity
Lamp on and off	The projector lamp can be instructed to turn on and off. When programmed one or more projectors, can be made to produce several basic effects including: Cut – Lamp is turned on or off quickly. When two projectors are involved, the lamp in one projector is turned off while the lamp in a second is turned, made to appear that these two actions are made at the same time. A cue based on a cut will include a slide tray advance, unless designated an "alt" (see Alternate).; Hard Cut – By first using the slide projector shutter, the transition between two projectors can be made faster than by controlling the lamp on and off. A visible "shutter chop" can be seen, depending on the shutter speed of the projector involved.; Soft Cut – Usually a term applied to a fast dissolve that takes place in less than a second.; Alternate – Appears as a cut, but with no slide tray advance.; Fast Alternate – As above, but allowing the programmer to create flickering effects while the lamp intensity fades up or down.
Lamp Fade	Fade – A timed, controlled operation where the projector lamp is either turned on or off over a set period of time, producing the effect of the slide image slowly appearing or disappearing on the screen.; Dissolve – A timed crossfading of two or more projectors. Dissolves can be programmed to occur as quickly as one second, or as slow as 32 seconds.; Freeze – During a fade process, the intensity or light output of the lamp in any projector can be stopped in time at a given light intensity for a given period of time. This capability can be used to produce complex multi-projector dissolves. Also, it allows for a projected background to be "faded back" while a brighter image is superimposed.

	AVL "Procall": Other Commands
Timing	Wait X – Add timing to a sequence during programming either to add padding to a programmed effect or as a temporary timing pad that will be resolved as the programming is completed. The 'X' represents a time value, expressed in seconds and hundredths of seconds.; Time X – Instructing a programmed event or sequence of events to begin at the time read from the timecode track of a prerecorded tape. The 'X' represents a time value, expressed in hours, minutes, seconds and hundredths of seconds, or hours, minutes, seconds and SMPTE video frames. During programming, the computer reads the incoming timecode. With the program list resting at a Time X cue, a snapshot of the incoming timecode is recorded when the Enter key is struck.
Other effects	Loop Load/Loop Go/Loop Stop – Loads a sequence of commands to be repeated continuously until instructed to stop. During a Loop sequence, the programming computer is freed-up to control other projectors.; Blink Alt/Blink Load/Blink Go/Blink Stop – Loads a sequence of blink commands to be repeated continuously until instructed to stop. A series of projectors can be included, with lamp fade up/down options available, with the ability to preprogram cycle-animation into a Blink sequence. During a Blink sequence, the programming computer is freed-up to control other projectors.

Through synchronizing the audio and the visual effects and combining visual slide effects, the programming process could create a single continuous show that was saved to memory. Once the programming was completed, the most common way to preserve the programming information was to record the programming cues onto the audio track so that the show could be run synchronized with the audio playback. In some situations, data would be contained in the programming computer (stored either on an internal hard disk drive or a floppy disk), and the events would be triggered by a timecode track on the audio tape.

As multi-image programming devices progressed to digital computers and became more sophisticated in the late 1970s, more programming features were added. Complex looping effects, independent cycling allowing background animation over foreground effects, comprehensive control of motion picture projectors, control of (and by) video devices and other peripheral devices, and the use of SMPTE timecode for synchronization became commonplace. Multiply-exposed optical effects and the use of computer-generated imagery allowed the medium to emerge, briefly, as an art form. The use of multitrack audio playback enhanced the experience and provided for surround sound.

=== On the road ===
Completed multi-image productions were presented in a variety of venues ranging from temporary one-on-one settings to semi-permanent world's fair pavilions and museum exhibitions. Large multi-projector multi-image presentations required adequate projection space which was often from behind the screen for rear-screen projection. Setting up large show required control over the room lighting and often involved drapes and scaffolds.

The actual presentations often were considered to be business theater, incorporating special effects such as pyrotechnics, breakaway screens, live entertainment, even breakaway screens such as having a vehicle crash through the screen to introduce a new model truck.

== See also ==
- Eagle Computer § Multi-image models
- Multi-dynamic image technique
- Multi-monitor
- Multimedia
- Slide show
- Split screen (filmmaking)
- Video wall
