= Canon (film) =

1964 film

- Directed by: Norman McLaren; Grant Munro
- Produced by: Norman McLaren
- Cinematography: Robert Humble
- Music by: Eldon Rathburn
- Production company: National Film Board of Canada
- Distributed by: National Film Board of Canada
- Release date: 1964
- Running time: 9 minutes
- Country: Canada

Canon is a 1964 National Film Board of Canada animated short co-directed by Norman McLaren and Grant Munro that offers a visual representation of the canon musical form through three animated segments. The soundtrack combines both a recorded classical score by Eldon Rathburn and electronic sounds produced via synthesizer.

The film uses object animation as cubes moves in checkboards and it also use non-camera animation as only four peoples doing gestures.

== Awards ==
- Montreal International Film Festival, Montreal: First Prize, Best Animated Film, 1965
- 3rd International Film Festival of India, New Delhi: Bronze Peacock, Second Prize, 1965
- 17th Canadian Film Awards, Toronto: Genie Award for Best Film, Arts and Experimental, 1965
