= Francis Chapman =

Canadian cinematographer and film and television director (1927–2020)

Francis Sweetland Chapman (January 24, 1927 - September 5, 2020) was a Canadian cinematographer and film and television director. He was most noted for the film Expedition Bluenose, for which he and his twin brother Christopher Chapman jointly won the Canadian Film Award for Best Colour Cinematography at the 17th Canadian Film Awards in 1965.

Francis and Christopher were the sons of architect Alfred Hirschfelder Chapman of Chapman and Oxley and concert pianist Doris Dennison Chapman.

As a director, his credits included episodes of United!, Adventures in Rainbow Country, McQueen, The Starlost and Téléfrançais. He was also a Canadian Film Award nominee for Best Director at the 21st Canadian Film Awards in 1969, for the McQueen pilot episode "There's a Car Upside Down on My Lawn".

In 1984, Francis and Christopher collaborated on a three-dimensional nature film for the nascent Science North.
