= The Real Story of Happy Birthday to You =

- Directed by: Gerald Potterton
- Written by: Don Arioli; Gerald Potterton; William Litwack
- Produced by: William Litwack; Ronald A. Weinberg
- Starring: Roger Daltrey; Ed Asner
- Edited by: Nathalie Rossin
- Music by: Milan Kymlicka
- Production companies: Cinar; France Animation S.A.
- Distributed by: CTV Television Network
- Release date: January 4, 1992
- Running time: 30 minutes
- Countries: Canada; France
- Language: English

The Real Story of Happy Birthday to You is a made-for-TV French-Canadian children's animated special directed by Gerald Potterton as part of The Real Story of... / Favorite Songs animated anthology series. The short was produced by Cinar and France Animation in association with Crayon Animation and Western Publishing and was released in January 1992 in the United States. It also features the voices of Ed Asner and Roger Daltrey.

== Plot ==
The story involves neglected child Olivia, whose only friends are Charlie the Horse and Barnaby the Stablehand. Olivia wants her own special birthday song, but her evil caretaker tries to keep her from hearing it.

== Cast ==
- Ed Asner as Charlie
- Roger Daltrey as Barnaby
- Sonja Ball as Olivia
- A.J. Henderson as Chef Henri
- Liz MacRae as Maid
- Judi Richards as Maid
- Carlyle Miller as Gardener
- Dan Lebel as Gardener
- Tony Robinow as Lord O/Snitchgrovel
- Paula Harding Howe as Lady O

== Production ==
The film was produced in 1991.

Czech-Canadian composer Milan Kymlicka provided the music for the film. He has also composed music for other Canadian TV series such as Babar, Rupert, The Busy World of Richard Scarry, The Legend of White Fang, The Adventures of Paddington Bear, the 1997 version of Lassie, Alfred Hitchcock Presents, Night Hood and The Neverending Story.

== Songs ==
- The Girlie Wants a Song

Music by Milan Kymlicka, Lyrics by Gerald Potterton

- The Birthday Contest Medley

Music by Milan Kymlicka, Lyrics by Gerald Potterton

- Happy Birthday to You

Used by permission Warner Bros. Music, Written by Patty Hill and Mildred J. Hill

== Broadcast ==
The film was first broadcast on CTV Television Network and then on Family Channel and Showcase in Canada and later on HBO in the USA. It has also been airing on Cartoon Network and the BBC in the UK, RTB in Brunei, ABC TV in Australia, ATV World in Hong Kong, M-Net and SABC1 in South Africa, RTÉ in the Republic of Ireland, Prime 12, Premiere 12 and Channel 5 in Singapore, TPI in Indonesia, TV1 in Malaysia, BFBS and SSVC Television in Germany, Arutz HaYeladim in Israel and Channel 2 in New Zealand. All twenty channels have aired it along with all the other animated short films in The Real Story of... / Favorite Songs series.

== Home media ==
It was first released on video by Golden Book Video and later Sony Wonder in the USA and released again by ABC Video and Roadshow Entertainment. The Australian release also contained another short film The Real Story of Twinkle, Twinkle Little Star which featured the voices of Vanna White and Martin Short.
