= The Selfish Giant (1971 film) =

- US TV Guide print ad
- Genre: Animation
- Directed by: Peter Sander
- Voices of: The King's Singers
- Narrated by: Paul Hecht; Charles Aznavour (French version)
- Theme music composer: Ron Goodwin
- Composer: Ron Goodwin
- Country of origin: Canada
- Original language: English

Production
- Producers: Gerald Potterton; Murray Shostak
- Running time: 26 minutes
- Production companies: Potterton Productions; Pyramid Films; Reader's Digest

Original release
- Network: CTV
- Release: 26 November 1971

Related
- The Happy Prince

The Selfish Giant is an animated short film adaptation of the short story by Oscar Wilde. The story has symbolic religious themes and may be considered a work of allegory in Christian literature. It earned a 44th Academy Award nomination in the Animated Short Subject category. It was entered in the 22nd Berlin International Film Festival, winning the Silver Bear for Best Short Film.

== Production and release ==
The film was produced in 1971 by the Canadian-based Potterton Productions, Pyramid Films and Reader's Digest.

One of the film's animators was Micheline Lanctôt. The King's Singers provided the vocals after having formed only a few years before.

The film first aired on Canadian television on 26 November 1971 on CTV. It aired in the United States on CBS on 28 March 1973.

== Plot ==
A giant erects a wall to keep children out of his garden, reaping the consequences of a continuous winter. After months of winter with no other seasons in sight, spring suddenly returns when the children slip into a hole in the wall and play in the trees, except for one corner of winter where a little boy is too small to climb into the tree. The giant's heart melts at the sight and, realizing how selfish he's been, he helps the child into the tree. He then tears down the wall and tells the children it was their garden to play in. Years pass and the giant enjoys playing with the children, but never sees the one special boy he first helped. One day when he had grown old, he again sees the little boy, who appears with wounds in His hands and feet. He has come to escort the giant to His garden, which is paradise.

== Soundtrack ==
The original soundtrack of the film, featuring narration by Paul Hecht, was released in 1973 by Reader's Digest and Capitol.

=== Track listing ===
All music is composed by Ron Goodwin.

Side One
No.	Title	Lyrics	Recording artists	Length
1.	"Children Leaving Home"			1:43
2.	"The Giant Returns Home"			2:32
3.	"Building A Wall"	Ron Goodwin	The King's Singers	2:00
4.	"The Children Leave The Garden"			1:50
5.	"Dance of the Frost, The Snow and the North Wind"			1:54
6.	"The Arrival of the North Wind"			0:48

Side Two
No.	Title	Lyrics	Recording artists	Length
1.	"Dance of the Hail"			3:15
2.	"Autumn's Arrival"			0:50
3.	"The Children Return to the Garden"			3:09
4.	"The Giant Relents"			3:07
5.	"Years Go Over"	Ron Goodwin	The King's Singers	2:00
6.	"The Death of the Giant"			2:56
Total length:				24:04

== Home media ==
The film was released on VHS by Reader's Digest in 1985, paired with The Remarkable Rocket, by Random House in 1986, and by Family Home Entertainment in 1992. In the UK, it was issued on VHS by Diplomat Video alongside The Happy Prince and The Little Mermaid.

== See also ==
- The Happy Prince (1974 film)
- The Selfish Giant (2013 film)
