= The Settler =

1952 film

- French: L'Abatis
- Directed by: Bernard Devlin; Raymond Garceau
- Written by: Bernard Devlin
- Produced by: Guy Glover
- Narrated by: Jean Sarrazin (French); William Greaves (English)
- Cinematography: Denis Gillson
- Edited by: Victor Jobin
- Music by: Morris Surdin
- Production company: National Film Board of Canada
- Release date: 1952
- Running time: 16 minutes
- Country: Canada
- Languages: English; French

The Settler (French: L'Abatis) is a Canadian short documentary film, directed by Bernard Devlin and Raymond Garceau and released in 1952. The film depicts the history of settlement in the Abitibi region of Quebec.

The film was released both in a French-language version narrated by Jean Sarrazin, and an English-language version narrated by William Greaves.

The film received an honorable mention for the Canadian Film Award for Best Theatrical Short Film at the 6th Canadian Film Awards in 1954.
