= Grant Munro (filmmaker) =

Canadian animator, filmmaker and actor

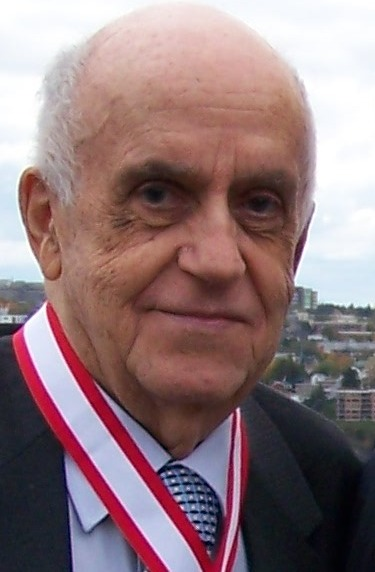
- Born: April 25, 1923; Winnipeg, Manitoba, Canada
- Died: December 9, 2017 (aged 94); Montreal, Quebec, Canada
- Occupations: Filmmaker, animator
- Years active: 1945–1988
- Awards: Officer of the Order of Canada; Dr. hc, Concordia University (Film awards below)

Grant Munro OC LL. D. (April 25, 1923 – December 9, 2017) was a Canadian animator, filmmaker and actor. In 1952, he co-starred with Jean-Paul Ladouceur in Norman McLaren's Neighbours. His film, Christmas Cracker, was nominated for an Academy Award in 1965.

== Early life ==
Munro was born and raised in Winnipeg, Manitoba. After graduating from Gordon Bell High School, he went to the Musgrove School of Art and the Winnipeg School of Art. In 1944, he graduated with honors from the Ontario College of Art and joined the National Film Board (NFB) in the same year.

== Career ==
Munro's work as an animator first won notice during 1945, when he set the songs "My Darling Clementine" and "The Daring Young Man on the Flying Trapeze" to animated cut-outs. He left the NFB in 1947 to work with another company, returning in 1951, in time to perform the physically demanding role of one of the neighbours in Norman McLaren's Neighbours, a film which used the technique known as "pixilation" (a term coined by Munro) and which won both a Canadian Film Award and an Academy Award. In 1957, he moved to London to work as Director of Animation for George Dunning's TV Cartoons; he returned to the NFB in 1961. In 1970, he moved to Cuba and, for two years, worked for the Instituto Cubano del Arte e Industria Cinematográficos.

Munro collaborated with McLaren on the animated films Two Bagatelles (1952), Christmas Cracker (1963) and Canon (1964). In the 1970s, his focus shifted to documentaries. He directed: Tours en l'air (1974), a film about work of dancers Anna-Marie and David Holmes; Boo Hoo (1975), which concerned a cemetery and crematorium in Saint John, New Brunswick; and Animated Motion (parts 1–5, 1976–8) and McLaren on McLaren (1983), which documented the work and philosophy of his friend and colleague. He also directed See You in the Funny Papers (1983), which examined the life and work of cartoonist Lynn Johnston.

Munro retired from the National Film Board in 1988. He died in Montreal on December 9, 2017, at the age of 94.

=== Honours ===
On June 20, 2007 Concordia University awarded Munro an honorary doctorate in recognition of his legacy for generations of filmmakers.

On October 10, 2008, Munro was made an Officer in the Order of Canada by Governor General Michaëlle Jean. The backgrounder to the award read as follows:

Grant Munro is a pioneering animator and filmmaker. One of the earliest and longest-serving members of the National Film Board of Canada, he developed innovative techniques that influenced both the film industry and other animators. He produced films that were used as public education tools in schools across Canada, and collaborated with the Montreal Children’s Hospital to create educational films for children with learning disabilities. As well, he was involved in making several award-winning film's and has been an inspiring role model and dedicated mentor to several generations of young filmmakers.

=== Grant Munro Rediscovered ===
On December 4, 2003, the Museum of Modern Art paid tribute to Munro with Grant Munro Rediscovered, a retrospective program of his work:

On the occasion of Grant Munro’s eightieth birthday and the release of a new DVD, Cut-Up: The Films of Grant Munro, the Museum of Modern Art pays tribute to this seminal but under-recognized animator. Working from within the historic Animation Unit of the National Film Board of Canada from 1945 through the early 1970s, Munro directed, produced, shot, edited, and even acted in some of the most significant hand-drawn and pixilated animation ever made. A frequent collaborator with Norman McLaren, Munro brought a wicked wit and sublime grace to the art.

In 2003, a DVD of his work entitled Cut-Up: The Films of Grant Munro was released. It includes two Munro-McLaren collaborations which they did not complete: On the Farm and Six and Seven Eighths.

== Filmography ==
Director and/or Producer, Animator

- Let's All Sing Together: No. 3 - animated short, Norman McLaren 1945 - co-animator with René Jodoin
- Let's All Sing Together: No. 4 - animated short, Norman McLaren 1945 - co-animator with Jim MacKay and Jean-Paul Ladouceur
- Let's All Sing Together: No. 5 - animated short, Norman McLaren 1945 - co-animator with Jean-Paul Ladouceur
- Let's All Sing Together: No. 6 - animated short, Norman McLaren 1945 - co-animator with Jean-Paul Ladouceur and René Jodoin
- The Three Blind Mice - animated short, George Dunning 1945 - co-animator with George Dunning and Robert Verrall
- Stanley Takes a Trip - animated short, 1947 - co-animator with Helen MacKay, co-director with Helen MacKay and Jim MacKay
- Christmas Carols - animated short, 1947 - co-animator
- Two Bagatelles - experimental film, 1952 - co-director with Norman McLaren
- Neighbours - experimental film, Norman McLaren 1952 - cast
- One Little Indian - puppet film, 1954 - director
- Huff and Puff - animated training film, Graham Crabtree 1955 -co-animator with Gerald Potterton
- The Standard Range Approach - training film, Michael Birch and René Jodoin 1957 - animator
- My Financial Career - animated short, Gerald Potterton 1962 - co-animator with Gerald Potterton
- Pot-pourri - montage, 1962 - co-director with Jeff Hale, Derek Lamb, Austin Campbell, Kaj Pindal, Cameron Guess and Rhoda Leyer
- What Farm Price Support Means to You - documentary short, Ernest Reid 1962 - animator
- Christmas Cracker - animated short 1963 - co-director with Norman McLaren, Gerald Potterton and Jeff Hale
- Seven Surprizes - compilation 1963 - co-director with Norman McLaren, and Claude Jutra
- Canon - animated film, 1964 - co-producer and co-director with Norman McLaren
- The Animal Movie - animated short film, 1966 - animator, co-director with Ron Tunis
- Toys - documentary short, 1966 - producer, director
- Ashes of Doom - short film, 1970 - editor, co-director with Nadia Salnick
- Where There's Smoke - compilation, 1970 - co-director
- General Health - documentary short, 1970 - co-director with Břetislav Pojar and Don Arioli
- Nutrition - documentary short, 1970 - co-director with Břetislav Pojar and Don Arioli
- Percy Saltzman Anti-Smoking Clip - documentary short, 1971 - co-director with Don Arioli
- Tour en l'air - documentary short, 1974 - co-editor, producer, director
- Boo Hoo - documentary short, 1975 - director
- Animated Motion: Part 1 - instructional film, 1976 - co-producer and co-director with Norman McLaren
- Animated Motion: Part 2 - instructional film, 1976 - co-producer and co-director with Norman McLaren
- Animated Motion: Part 3 - instructional film, 1977 - co-producer and co-director with Norman McLaren
- Animated Motion: Part 4 - instructional film, 1977 - co-producer and co-director with Norman McLaren
- Animated Motion: Part 5 - instructional film, 1978 - co-producer and co-director with Norman McLaren
- McLaren on McLaren - documentary short 1983 - director
- See You in the Funny Papers - documentary short, 1983 - co-editor, producer, director

== Awards ==
One Little Indian (1954)

- Rapallo International Film Festival, Rapallo, Italy: Great Cup of the Province of Genoa, 1956
- Rapallo International Film Festival, Rapallo, Italy: First Prize & Silver Medal, Abstract Films, 1956
- National Committee on Films for Safety, Chicago: First Prize, Bronze Plaque, Traffic & Transportation, 1955
- Golden Reel International Film Festival, Film Council of America, New York: Recognition of Merit, 1955
- Kootenay Film Festival, Nelson, British Columbia: Certificate of Merit, Second Award, Artistic Achievement, 1955
- 7th Canadian Film Awards, Toronto: Honorable Mention, Non-Theatrical, 1955

Pot-pourri (1962)

- 14th Canadian Film Awards, Toronto: Award of Merit - Filmed Commercials (Public Service), 1962

Christmas Cracker (1963)

- Golden Gate International Film Festival, San Francisco: First Prize, Best Animated Short, 1964
- Electronic, Nuclear and Teleradio Cinematographic Review, Rome: Grand Prize for Technique, Films for Children, 1965
- Electronic, Nuclear and Teleradio Cinematographic Review, Rome: Grand Prize for Animation Technique, 1965
- Film Centrum Foundation Film Show, Naarden, Netherlands: Silver Squirrel, Second Prize 1966
- Philadelphia International Festival of Short Films, Philadelphia: Award of Exceptional Merit, 1967
- Landers Associates Annual Awards, Los Angeles: Award of Merit, 1965
- 37th Academy Awards, Los Angeles: Nominee: Best Short Subject – Cartoons, 1965

Canon (1964)

- Montreal International Film Festival, Montreal: First Prize, Best Animated Film, 1965
- 3rd International Film Festival of India, New Delhi: Bronze Peacock, Second Prize, 1965
- 17th Canadian Film Awards, Toronto: Genie Award for Best Film, Arts and Experimental, 1965

The Animal Movie (1966)

- Venice Film Festival, Venice: Second Prize, Plaque of the Lion of St. Mark, 1966
- La Plata International Children's Film Festival, La Plata, Argentina: Silver Oak Leaf, First Prize, 1967
- Zlín Film Festival/International Film Festival for Children and Youth, Gottwaldov, Czechoslovakia: CIDALC First Prize 1967

Toys (1966)

- La Plata International Children's Film Festival, La Plata, Argentina: Silver Medal, 1968

Ashes of Doom (1970)

- International Festival of Short Films, Philadelphia: Award for Exceptional Merit, 1971

Tour en l'air (1974)

- American Film and Video Festival, New York: Blue Ribbon, Performing Arts, 1975
- Melbourne Film Festival, Melbourne: Diploma of Merit, 1975

Animated Motion (1976)

- Athens International Film/Video Festival, Athens, Georgia: Special Merit Award, 1978

See You in the Funny Papers (1983)

- Athens International Film/Video Festival, Athens, Georgia: Special Merit Award, 1984
