= The Seasons (1954 film) =

- Directed by: Christopher Chapman
- Produced by: Christopher Chapman
- Cinematography: Christopher Chapman
- Music by: Antonio Vivaldi
- Production company: Imperial Oil
- Distributed by: National Film Board of Canada
- Release date: August 2, 1954
- Running time: 18 minutes
- Country: Canada

The Seasons is a 1954 Canadian short documentary film directed by Christopher Chapman. Set to Antonio Vivaldi's The Four Seasons, the film depicts the cycle of the seasons throughout a year on the grounds of his parents' farm on the shore of Lake Simcoe.

The film won the Canadian Film Award for Film of the Year at the 6th Canadian Screen Awards.

Following Chapman's death in 2015, a public sculpture inspired by and named in honour of The Seasons was installed on the grounds of the ReachView Village seniors home in Uxbridge, Ontario, where Chapman had lived in his final years.
