= The Happy Prince (1974 film) =

- Title card
- Genre: Animation
- Directed by: Michael Mills
- Voices of: Glynis Johns; Christopher Plummer
- Narrated by: Christopher Plummer
- Composer: Ron Goodwin
- Country of origin: Canada
- Original language: English

Production
- Producers: Michael Mills; Gerald Potterton; Murray Shostak
- Running time: 25 minutes

Original release
- Network: CTV
- Release: 2 December 1974

Related
- The Selfish Giant

The Happy Prince is an animated short film adaptation of the short story by Oscar Wilde. The film was produced in 1974 by the Canadian-based Potterton Productions as a follow-up to its 1971 film The Selfish Giant. It is narrated by Christopher Plummer. The film premiered in Canada on CTV on December 2, 1974. It was broadcast in the US in syndication in 1975 and in the UK on the BBC.

== Plot ==
A royal statue makes friends with a swallow. The statue is moved by the suffering he sees around him and asks the swallow to peel off his gold covering leaf by leaf and give it to various poor and needy people.

== Artists ==
- Written for the screen and directed by Michael Mills
- Master animator: Jim Hiltz
- Animators: Robert Browning, Paul Driessen, Sebastian Grunstra, Julian Harris, Terence Harrison, Geoff Loynes, Gary Mooney, Paul Sabella, Paul Schibli, Don Stearn, Mike Stuart
- Background design: Sue Butterworth, John Dawson, Diane Desrosiers, Timothy Elliott, Michel Guerin, Caroline Price
- Sound editors: Peter Hearn, Gerard Senecal

== Music ==
Howard Blake was originally hired to score the film, and after writing a theme for the bird, and a song, he called the director and found out they had hired Ron Goodwin without telling him.
