= Gerald Potterton =

British-Canadian animator and director (1931–2022)

Gerald Potterton RCA
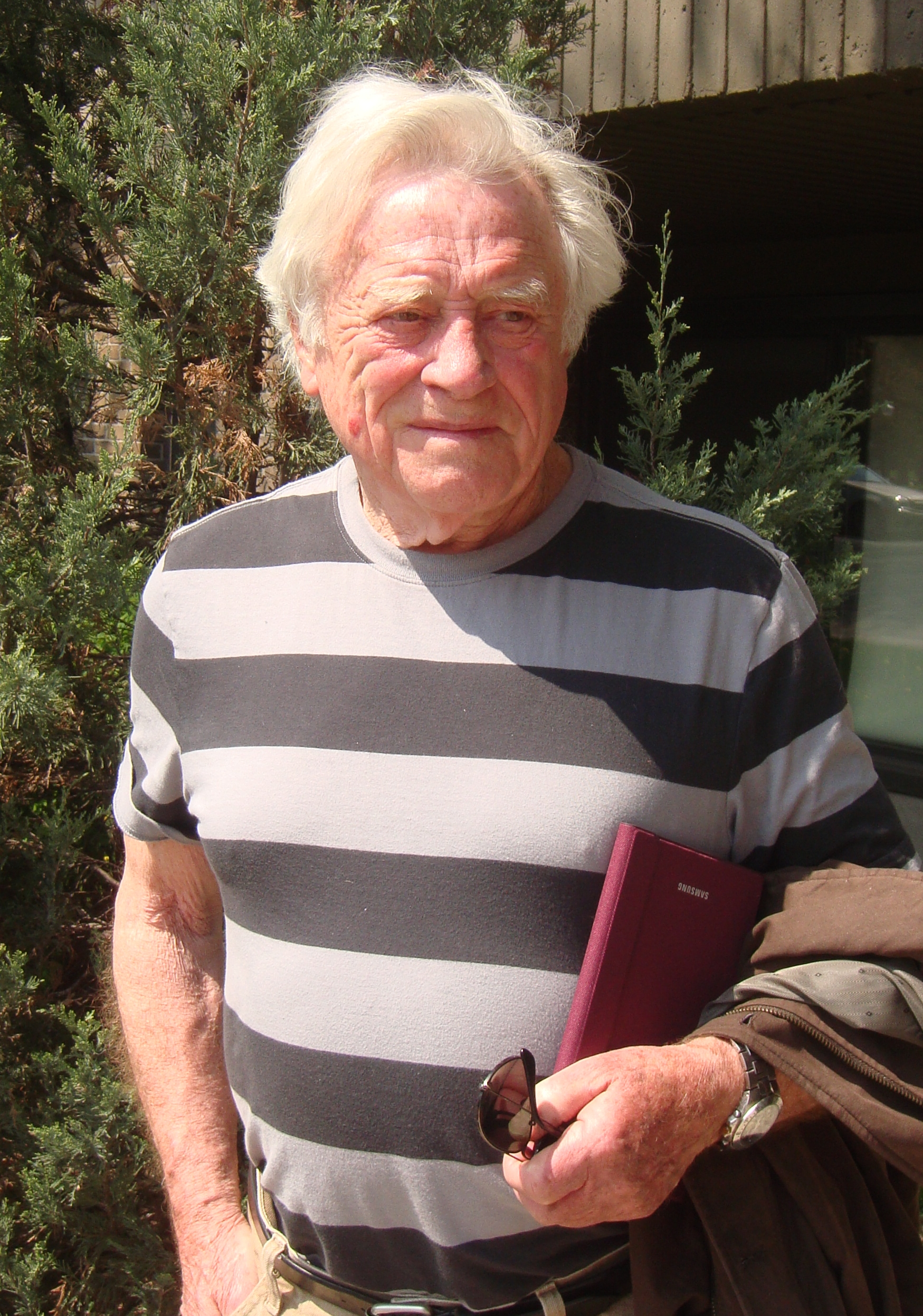
- Potterton in 2016
- Born: 8 March 1931; London, England
- Died: 23 August 2022 (aged 91); Cowansville, Quebec, Canada
- Occupations: Director, animator, producer, writer, artist
- Years active: 1952–2022
- Awards: Full list

Gerald Potterton RCA (8 March 1931 – 23 August 2022) was an English-Canadian director, animator, producer and writer. He is best known for directing the cult classic Heavy Metal and for his animation work on Yellow Submarine.

Potterton won one Peabody Award and was nominated three times for an Academy Award for Best Animated Short Film: as director on the National Film Board of Canada animated shorts My Financial Career and Christmas Cracker, and as producer for The Selfish Giant.

== Early life ==
Potterton was born and raised in south London's Tooting Bec neighbourhood, the eldest of three children born into an entertainment-industry family—his father was a professional musician and his uncle was the manager of the London Palladium. By age five, he was attending the Saturday morning pictures, where he first became interested in film; by 14, he was getting regular work as a child actor in live-action films being shot at Ealing Studios, Elstree Studios and Pinewood Studios. He won a place to study art at the Hammersmith Academy; upon graduation, in 1949, he was drafted to fight in the Korean War. He spent two years in the Royal Air Force; after his discharge, a neighbour suggested that he apply at Halas and Batchelor, the studio which was doing the animation work for the film Animal Farm, which would be Britain's first animated feature. By this time, Potterton had an excellent art portfolio, including a comic book; he was hired and spent the next two years there as an assistant animator.

During this time, Potterton also founded the Grasshopper Group, a cooperative with the mission to help London's animators produce their projects. He met Norman McLaren, the Scottish animator who was already on his way to becoming the star filmmaker at the National Film Board of Canada (NFB). Potterton also wanted to leave London, which had become intolerably dirty—the 1952 Great Smog of London, which killed at least 4,000 people, had a deep impact on him. That, and McLaren's description of Canada and working at the NFB, led him to move to Ottawa in 1954. He was hired by the NFB; his first project was the 1955 animated training film Huff and Puff.

== Career ==
Between 1954 and 1960, Potterton worked on 10 films. In 1960, he was offered a job as a filmmaker at Lars Calonius Productions, one of the largest TV and commercial animation films in the USA. Potterton left the NFB, moved to New York and worked at the firm for one year; he disliked living in New York and returned to the NFB, which had moved its offices to Montreal. The next seven years would be extremely fruitful for Potterton; his 1962 short film My Financial Career would be nominated for an Oscar, as would his next film, 1963's Christmas Cracker. He was then assigned to film a comedic travelogue of Canada, in which Buster Keaton rides 4,000 miles in a Railroad speeder. The result was The Railrodder, which won multiple awards and remains a popular film.

In 1967, Potterton's NFB colleague George Dunning asked him to work on his film Yellow Submarine, then being produced to feature The Beatles. While in London, Potterton had the opportunity to interview the British playwright Harold Pinter and came up with idea of a documentary about Pinter and his sketches Pinter's People. Potterton pitched the result to NBC; it aired as NBC Experiment in Television: Pinter People. The film won several awards, including a Peabody Award.

In 1968, Potterton founded his own company, Potterton Productions. He worked with various clients, notably Reader's Digest and Cinar, to produce several children's programs. The company produced Peter Sander's The Selfish Giant and Larry Kent's Fleur Bleue (The Apprentice) in 1971, as well as Mike Mills' The Happy Prince and Sander's The Little Mermaid in 1974 and, in 1975, The Christmas Messenger. He directed live-action and animated sequences for The Electric Company and Sesame Street; for the latter, he created the character of 'George the Farmer', who appeared in 18 episodes. He also had a large roster of ad agency clients for whom he produced commercials. By the mid-1980s, Potterton Productions was one of the largest independent production firms in Canada.

In 1981, Potterton was hired by producer Ivan Reitman to direct the animated feature Heavy Metal for Columbia Pictures. Potterton supervised all of the film's eight sequences, and the work of 65+ animators in Canada, England and the U.S. While reviews were mixed at release, Heavy Metal was the top-selling video for four consecutive weeks in the U.S. when it was released on video in 1998. It is now a cult classic.

In 1988, Potterton created and directed The Smoggies, a 53-episode animated series which aims to entertain and educate young children about environmental issues. It is still widely aired internationally.

== Books ==
In 1977, Potterton's friend Donald Pleasence made the children's album Scouse the Mouse. Ringo Starr was one of the voices on the album and he and Pleasence decided to write a companion book of the same name. Potterton was enlisted as its illustrator. In 1968, he had produced his own comedic illustrated book, The Star (and George); he would produce two more: In the Wake of Giants: Journeys on the Barrow and the Grand Canal (2008) and The Snowman: The Story of Joseph-Armand Bombardier in 2020.

== Later works ==
Potterton was an accomplished landscape painter. He was also a life-long aircraft buff, and created large, accurate, highly detailed paintings of planes; just before he died, he'd completed a painting of the Memphis Belle. He directed local theatre productions, and was organizing a fundraiser, using The Rainbow Boys, which was filmed in Lytton, British Columbia–he hoped to raise funds to help the town re-build after the Lytton wildfire. He continued to produce cartoons; his last project was Peter Piper and the Plane People, which was completed by Pascal Blais. When he died, he was working on a live-action comedy called A Stage Too Far.

== Personal life and death ==
Potterton's first wife was film editor Judith Merritt; his second wife was producer Karen Marginson. He had three sons. After moving to Montreal in 1961, Potterton spent the rest of his life in Quebec; the Potterton Productions head office was his home, a farm near Cowansville, in Quebec's Eastern Townships. After suffering a stroke, he died at Cowansville's Brome-Missisquoi-Perkins Hospital on 23 August 2022, at age 91.

== Filmography ==
- Animal Farm - animated film, John Halas and Joy Batchelor 1954 - animator
- Bride and Groom - short film 1955 - actor and, with John Daborn, co-director
- Huff and Puff - animated training film, Graham Crabtree 1955 - co-writer, co-animator with Grant Munro
- Fish Spoilage Control - animated short, David Bairstow 1956 - animator
- Follow That Car - animated film 1957 - director
- The Energy Picture - animated film 1957 - director
- It's a Crime - animated short, Wolf Koenig 1957 - animator
- Energy II - animated film 1958 - director
- Hors d'oeuvre - cartoon collection 1960 - co-director
- Life and Radiation - animated short, Hugh O'Connor 1960 - co-animator with Kenneth Horn & Pierre L'Amare
- My Financial Career - animated short 1962 - co-animator with Grant Munro, director
- Christmas Cracker - animated short 1963 - co-director with Norman McLaren, Grant Munro and Jeff Hale
- The Ride - short film 1963 - actor and director
- The Railrodder - short film 1965 - writer, director, co-editor with Jo Kirkpatrick
- The Quiet Racket - short film, 1966 - director
- Cool McCool - cartoon series 1966-1969 - co-director, with Gerald Ray, Ron Campbell and Peter Sander
- Superbus - animated short film 1967 - writer, producer, director
- The Trade Machine - animated film 1968 - director
- Yellow Submarine - animated feature, George Dunning 1968 - animator
- Pinter People - animated documentary 1969 - producer, director
- Sesame Street - animated episodes: 'George the Farmer', 1969-1973 - creator and director
- The Charge of the Snow Brigade - animated short 1970 - writer, producer, director
- Tiki Tiki - animated film 1971 - writer, producer, director
- The Selfish Giant - animated short, Peter Sander 1971 - producer
- The Electric Company - animated series 1971 - episode director
- The Rainbow Boys - feature, 1973 - writer, director
- The One Man Band That Went to Wall Street - animated short, Daum Crowther 1974 - producer, animator
- The Happy Prince - animated short, Michael Mills 1974 - producer
- The Little Mermaid - animated short, Peter Sander 1974 - producer
- The Remarkable Rocket - animated film 1975 - writer, producer, director
- The Christmas Messenger - animated film, Peter Sander 1975 - producer
- Raggedy Ann & Andy: A Musical Adventure - animated film, Richard Williams 1977 - animator and sequence director
- Canada Vignettes: Winter: Dressing Up - short film 1979 - writer and director
- Canada Vignettes: Winter: Starting the Car - short film 1979 - writer and director
- Heavy Metal - animated film 1981 - director
- The Awful Fate of Melpomenus Jones, animated short 1983 - director and animator
- Rubik, the Amazing Cube - animated series 1983 - episode director
- George and the Christmas Star - animated film 1985 - writer, animator, director
- The Wonderful Wizard of Oz - animated series, Masaru Tonogawachi & Hiroshi Saitō 1986 - animator
- Ghost Ship - animated film 1988 - writer, producer, director
- The Smoggies - animated series 1988 - writer, director, with Colin Thibert creator
- The Real Story of I'm a Little Teapot aka The Runaway Teapot - animated film 1991 - director
- The Real Story of Happy Birthday to You - animated film 1992 - writer, director
- The Real Story of Baa Baa Black Sheep - animated film 1994 - director
- Willy Bee - animated series 1996 - director
- The Magic Orchid - animated puppet feature 1998 - co-writer and director
- Albert & Atom - animated series 1999 - director
- Peter Piper and the Plane People - cartoon, 2015 - co-creator

== Awards ==
My Financial Career (1962)

- Golden Gate International Film Festival, San Francisco: First Prize, Animated Film, 1962
- American Film and Video Festival, New York: Blue Ribbon, Literature in Films, 1965
- 36th Academy Awards, Los Angeles: Nominee: Best Short Subject, Cartoons, 1963

Christmas Cracker (1963)

- Golden Gate International Film Festival, San Francisco: First Prize, Best Animated Short, 1964
- Electronic, Nuclear and Teleradio Cinematographic Review, Rome: Grand Prize for Technique, Films for Children, 1965
- Electronic, Nuclear and Teleradio Cinematographic Review, Rome: Grand Prize for Animation Technique, 1965
- Film Centrum Foundation Film Show, Naarden, Netherlands: Silver Squirrel, Second Prize 1966
- Philadelphia International Festival of Short Films, Philadelphia: Award of Exceptional Merit, 1967
- Landers Associates Annual Awards, Los Angeles: Award of Merit, 1965
- 37th Academy Awards, Los Angeles: Nominee: Best Short Subject – Cartoons, 1965

The Railrodder (1965)

- Festival of Tourist and Folklore Films, Brussels: Femina Award for Cinema, 1966
- 18th Canadian Film Awards, Montreal: Best Travel and Recreation Film, 1966
- BFI London Film Festival, London: Outstanding Film of the Year, 1966
- Berlin International Film Festival, Berlin: Special Commendation, 1965
- Locarno Film Festival, Locarno, Switzerland: Diploma of Honor, 1966
- Philadelphia International Festival of Short Films, Philadelphia: Award of Exceptional Merit, 1971

Pinter People (1968)

- Peabody Award, New York: George Foster Peabody Award for Television Entertainment, 1968
- Chicago International Film Festival, Chicago: Gold Hugo – Best of Festival 1969
- Chicago International Film Festival, Chicago: Silver Hugo – Best in Network Entertainment 1969
- Annecy International Animation Film Festival, Annecy, France: Special Jury Prize, 1969

The Selfish Giant (1971)

- 44th Academy Awards, Los Angeles: Nominee: Best Animated Short Subject, 1972

Tiki Tiki (1971)

- 23rd Canadian Film Awards, Toronto: Best Art Direction (Alexander Kuznetsov), 1971

The Rainbow Boys (1973)

- Atlanta Film Festival, Atlanta: Gold Medal – Best Foreign Feature, 1973

== Honors ==
- In 1975, Potterton was inducted as a member of the Royal Canadian Academy of Arts.
- From 1970 to 1971, Potterton was vice-president of the International Animated Film Association (ASIFA, Association Internationale du Film d'Animation).
- 1994 Ottawa International Animation Festival – retrospective
- 1997 Seattle International Film Festival – retrospective
- 1998 FIN Atlantic Film Festival, Halifax, Nova Scotia – juror
- 1998 World Animation Celebration, Pasadena: Top-Ten 'Artists Who Rock'
- 2000 Week with the Masters Animation Festival, Trivandrum, India – juror
- In 2002, Potterton was invited to the Buster Keaton Celebration in Iola, Kansas, Keaton's home town. For The Railrodder, he was presented with The Buster Award, given for "professional excellence in the tradition of Buster Keaton".
- In 2008, at the 12th Annual Cartoons on the Bay International Festival of Television Animation in Salerno, Potterton was awarded the Pulcinella Lifetime Achievement Award for excellence in animation.
- 2013 – Anifest, Teplice, Czechoslovakia – jury president
- 2020 Toronto Animation Film Festival – retrospective
- Potterton was board vice-president, Advisor and Jury Member of the Animaze Montreal International Animation Film Festival.

== Bibliography ==
- The Star (and George), Harper & Row 1968.
- Scouse the Mouse, by Donald Pleasence 1977 – illustrator
- In the Wake of Giants: Journeys on the Barrow and the Grand Canal, Ballyhay Books 2008
- L'Homme des Neiges: L’histoire de Joseph-Armand Bombardier (The Snowman: The story of Joseph-Armand Bombardier), 2020
- The Presidents' Secret – audiobook, narrator 2021
