= My Financial Career =

1962 film by Gerald Potterton

- Directed by: Gerald Potterton
- Produced by: Tom Daly; Colin Low
- Narrated by: Stanley Jackson
- Cinematography: Gerald Potterton (animation); Grant Munro (animation
- Edited by: Kathleen Shannon (sound)
- Production company: National Film Board of Canada
- Distributed by: National Film Board of Canada
- Release date: 1962
- Running time: 6 minutes, 30 seconds
- Country: Canada
- Languages: English, French

My Financial Career is a 1962 Oscar-nominated animated short directed by Gerald Potterton and produced by Colin Low and Tom Daly for the National Film Board of Canada.

== Summary ==
The cartoon is based on a story of the same name from one of Stephen Leacock's collections of short stories, Literary Lapses (1910). It takes a humorous look at a young man's attempt to open a bank account.

== Awards ==
- Golden Gate International Film Festival, San Francisco: First Prize, Animated Film, 1962
- American Film and Video Festival, New York: Blue Ribbon, Literature in Films, 1964
- 36th Academy Awards, Los Angeles: Nominee, Best Short Subject, Cartoons, 1963
