= Christmas Cracker (film) =

- Directed by: Jeff Hale; Norman McLaren; Grant Munro; Gerald Potterton
- Produced by: Tom Daly
- Starring: Grant Munro
- Music by: Maurice Blackburn; Eldon Rathburn
- Distributed by: National Film Board of Canada (NFB)
- Release dates: 1963 (Canada); 1964 (US)
- Running time: 9 minutes
- Country: Canada

Christmas Cracker (French: Caprice de Noël) is a 1963 animated short about Christmas, co-directed by Norman McLaren, Gerald Potterton, Grant Munro and Jeff Hale for the National Film Board of Canada. It was nominated for an Oscar in 1965.

== Synopsis ==
Christmas Cracker features Grant Munro as a playful clown who presents three segments: a rendition of "Jingle Bells" in which a cutout animation of two figures dance; a dime-store rodeo of tin toys; and a story about decorating the perfect Christmas tree with a Christmas star. Between each segment, the clown does a short transition while a chiptune rendition of "The Holly and the Ivy" plays.

== Jingle Bells ==
The first of three segments presented by the clown displays two cutout animation figures dance together while a guitar rendition of "Jingle Bells". The figures are wearing trapezoids as clothing with boots. As the guitar progresses, the cutout animation figures’ dancing accelerates.

== Tin Toys ==
The second segment is stop-motion animation of toys coming to life. In this short film is a tin butterfly, alligator, bird, robot, clown, and cat. The background music is a fast guitar, accompanied with a bass guitar playing jazz. The clown then joins back into the movie following electric music.

== Christmas Tree Decoration ==
The final segment is a little cartoon man decorating the ultimate Christmas tree. The music, unlike the two other segments, strays away from guitar and is played by an organ. This adds dramatic effect to the decoration of the Christmas tree. This segment was later expanded into a half-hour special by Gerald Potterton called "George and the Christmas Star", which followed the same basic premise.

== Awards ==
- Golden Gate International Film Festival, San Francisco: First Prize, Best Animated Short, 1964
- Electronic, Nuclear and Teleradio Cinematographic Review, Rome: Grand Prize for Technique, Films for Children, 1965
- Electronic, Nuclear and Teleradio Cinematographic Review, Rome: Grand Prize for Animation Technique, 1965
- Film Centrum Foundation Film Show, Naarden, Netherlands: Silver Squirrel, Second Prize 1966
- Philadelphia International Festival of Short Films, Philadelphia: Award of Exceptional Merit, 1967
- Landers Associates Annual Awards, Los Angeles: Award of Merit, 1965
- 37th Academy Awards, Los Angeles: Nominee: Best Short Subject – Cartoons, 1965

== Related films ==
- Noël Noël
- An Old Box
